= Øster Allé =

Street in Copenhagen, Denmark

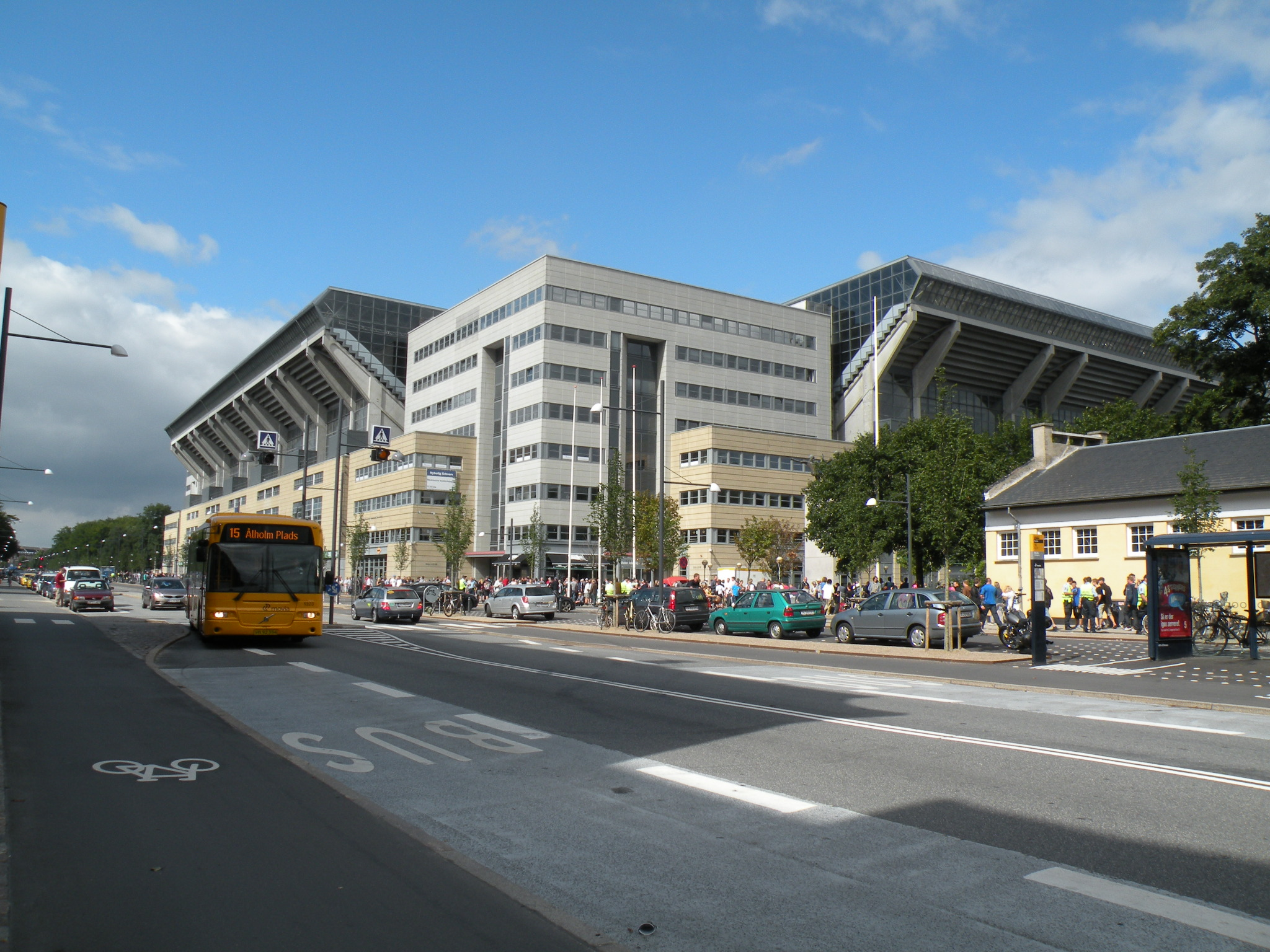
- Øster Allé with Parken Stadium
- Length: 1,120 m (3,670 ft)
- Location: Copenhagen, Denmark
- Quarter: Østerbro
- Postal code: 2100
- Coordinates: 55°42′5.4″N 12°34′19.2″E

Øster Allé (lit. 'East Avenue') is a street in the Østerbro district of Copenhagen, Denmark, connecting Trianglen to Vibenhus Runddel. The northern part of the street, after Parken Stadium, Denmark's national football stadium, bisects Fælledparken, Copenhagen's largest park.

A metro station on the City Circle Line is located at each end of the street, Trianglen station to the south, and Vibenshus Runddel station to the north.

== History ==
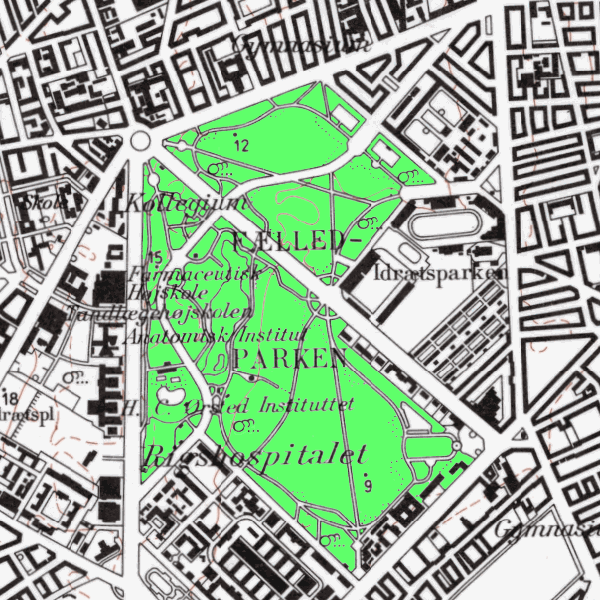
Øster Allé seen on a map from 1967

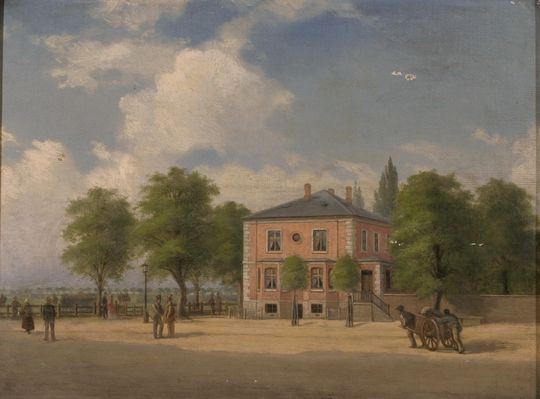
The beginning of Øster Allé from today's Trianglen, painted in 1860 by Anthon Lund

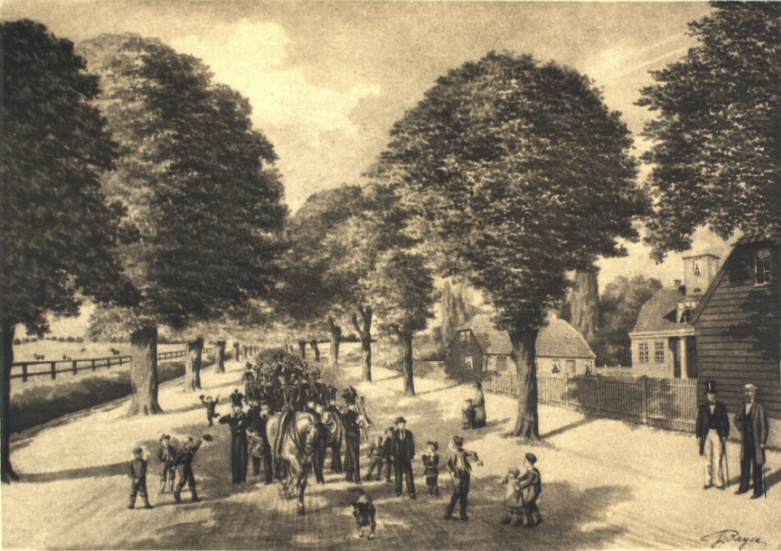
Drawing of the avenue by Christian Bayer

The street follows the course of a dirt track which from the early 17th century connected Østerbrogade (the East Road) to Vibenhus across Østerfælled, one of the commons which surrounded Copenhagen until the mid-19th century. The track was expanded and converted into a tree-lined avenue in 1750. The trees came from Kongens Nytorv, when the circle of trees surrounding the equestrian statue of Christian V was removed. The trees have since been renewed on several occasions and many have been replaced by street-side parking.

When Copenhagen began to develop beyond its former Fortification Ring, which was decommissioned in the 1850s, only the first part of the north-east side of the street was built over. A large portion of Østerfælled remained open and in 1908 was turned into Fælledparken park. A narrow strip of land on the south-west side of the street was reserved for redevelopment a few years later.

== Notable buildings and structures ==
On the north-east side of the street, at No. 6, is the former Eastern Power Station. It was designed by city architect Ludvig Fenger and opened in 1902.

Between the power station and Parken Stadium (No. 50), are two examples of workers' housing. The older one is Brumleby, whose first stage with its 240 diminutive dwellings was designed by Michael Gottlieb Bindesbøll and completed in 1857. It is considered to be Denmark's first example of social housing and was one of the first structures to be built on Østerbro. Between Brumleby and Østerbro Power Station, on both sides of Olufsgade, a short street connecting Øster Allé to Østerbrogade, is one of the Workers' Building Society's smaller developments of terraced housing.

On the south-west side of Øster Allé, No. 1 is the former Østerbro Post and Telegraph Office from 1920. The Neoclassical building was designed by Thorvald Jørgensen, who also designed Christiansborg Palace. Its main façade, with four large columns and a flight of steps the full width of the building, faces a space on the corner with Blegdamsvej.

The symmetrical building at No. 26, Fredenshus, was completed for the Association for the Education of Apprentices (Danish: Foreningen til Lærlinges Uddannelse) to a design by Søren Lemche in 1915.

No. 33 is the former home of businessman Aage Heyman. The building was constructed in 1918 to designs by the architect Gotfred Tvede It now houses the embassy of the United Arab Emirates.

== Monuments ==
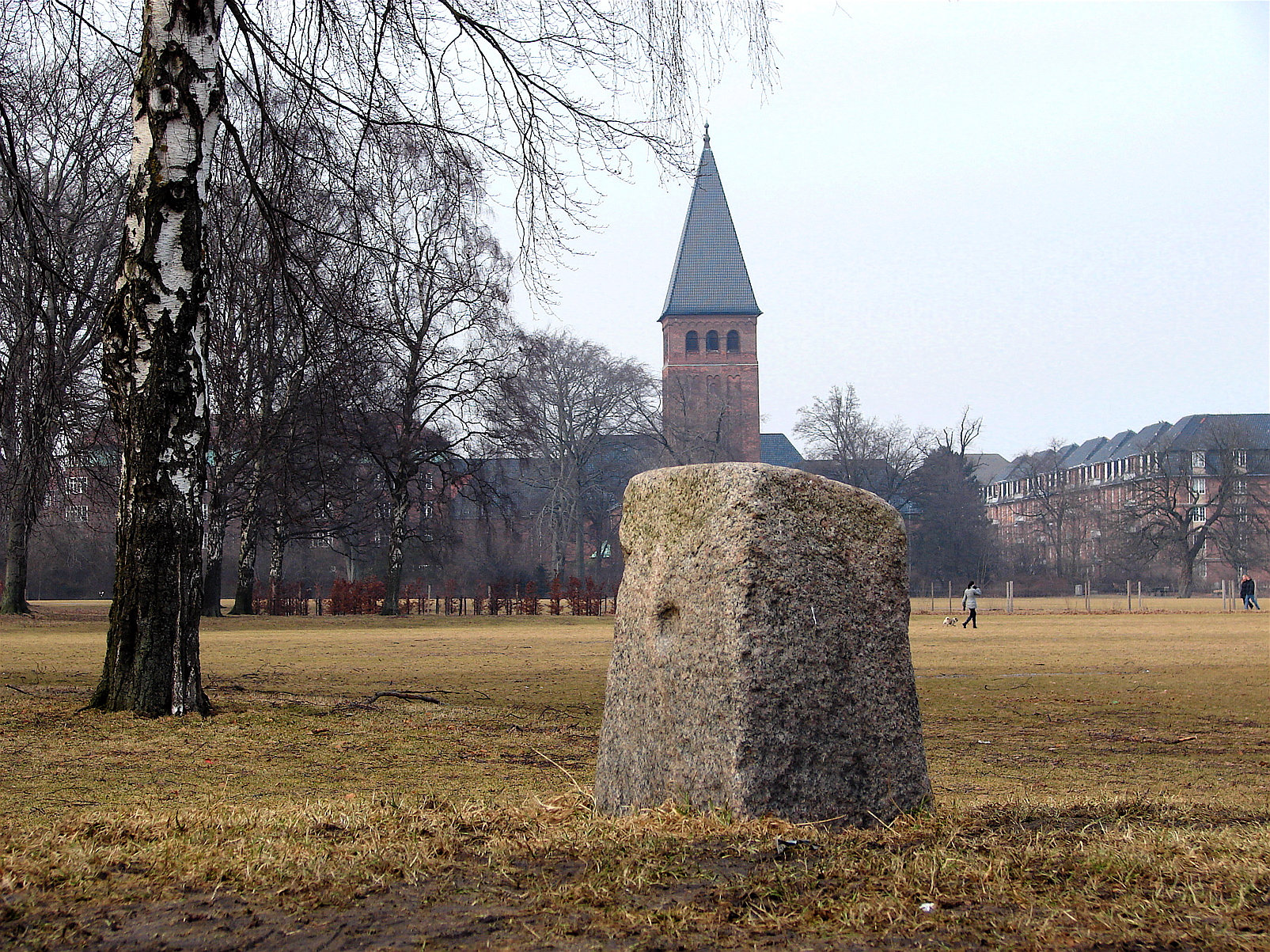
The quarter milestone with St. Augustin's Church on Jagtvej as a backdrop

On the northeast side of the street stands a stone popularly known as the Struense Stone, referring to Johann Friedrich Struensee who was executed on the Eastern Common in 1772. The stone has, however, nothing to do with Struense being a quarter milestone installed in 1698 in connection with Ole Rømer's survey of Denmark. It indicated there was a quarter of a mile (1.75 km) to the Eastern City Gate.
