= Haraldsgade =

Street in Copenhagen

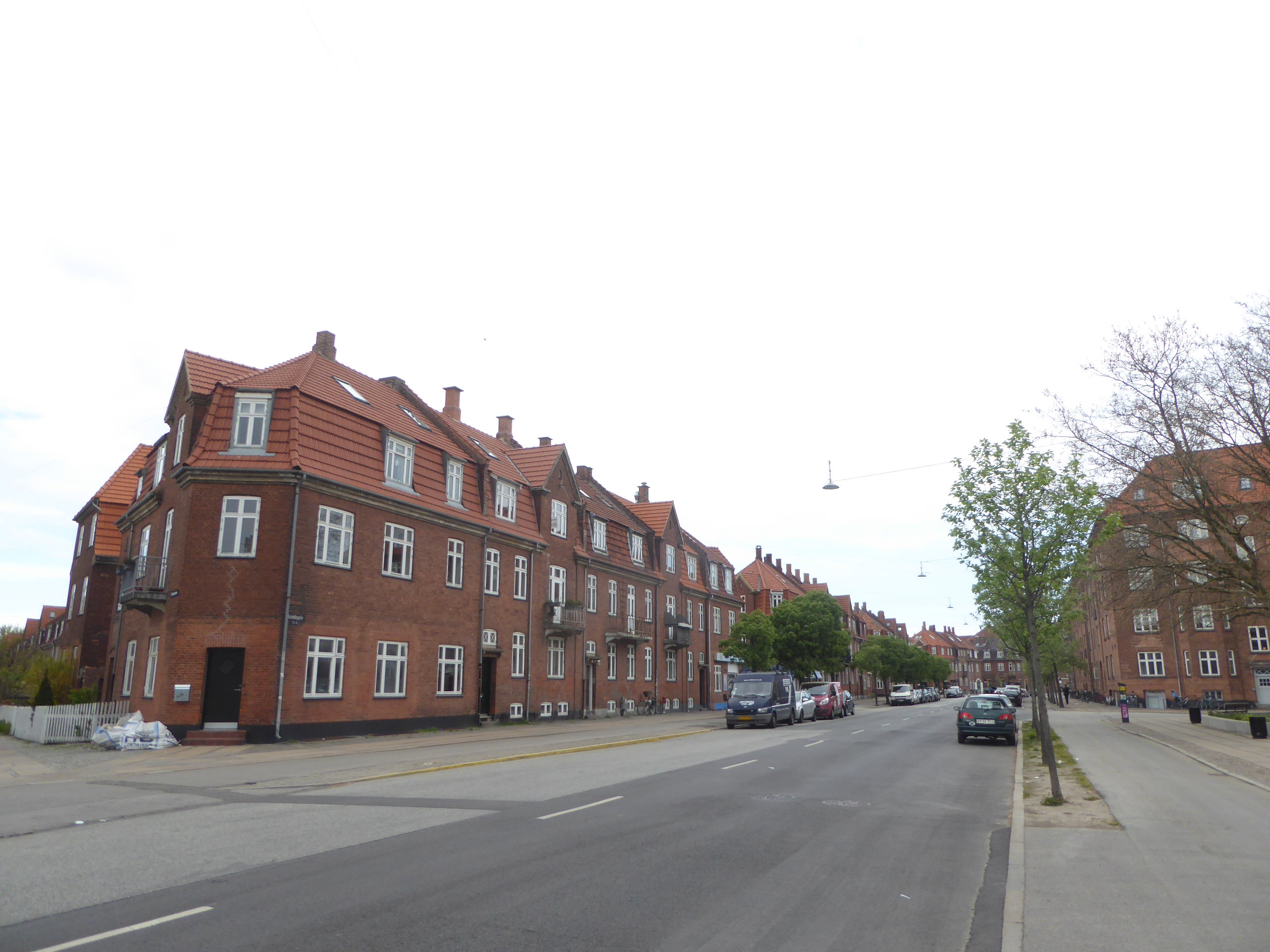
- Haraldsgade at Teglværksgade
- Length: 1,100 m (3,600 ft)
- Location: Nørrebro/Østerbro; Copenhagen, Denmark
- Postal code: 2100, 2200
- Coordinates: 55°42′23.79″N 12°33′15.76″E

Haraldsgade (lit. 'Harald Street') is an approximately 1.1 km long street in the outer Nørrebro and Østerbro districts of Copenhagen, Denmark. It runs from Tagensvej in the southwest to Lyngbyvej in the northeast. Skjolds Plads Station, a station on the Copenhagen Metro City Circle Line, is located at the beginning of the street. The station takes its name after Skjolds Plads, a small square located off the east side of the street. The southwestern end of the street was closed to through traffic in connection with the opening of the metro station.

== History ==
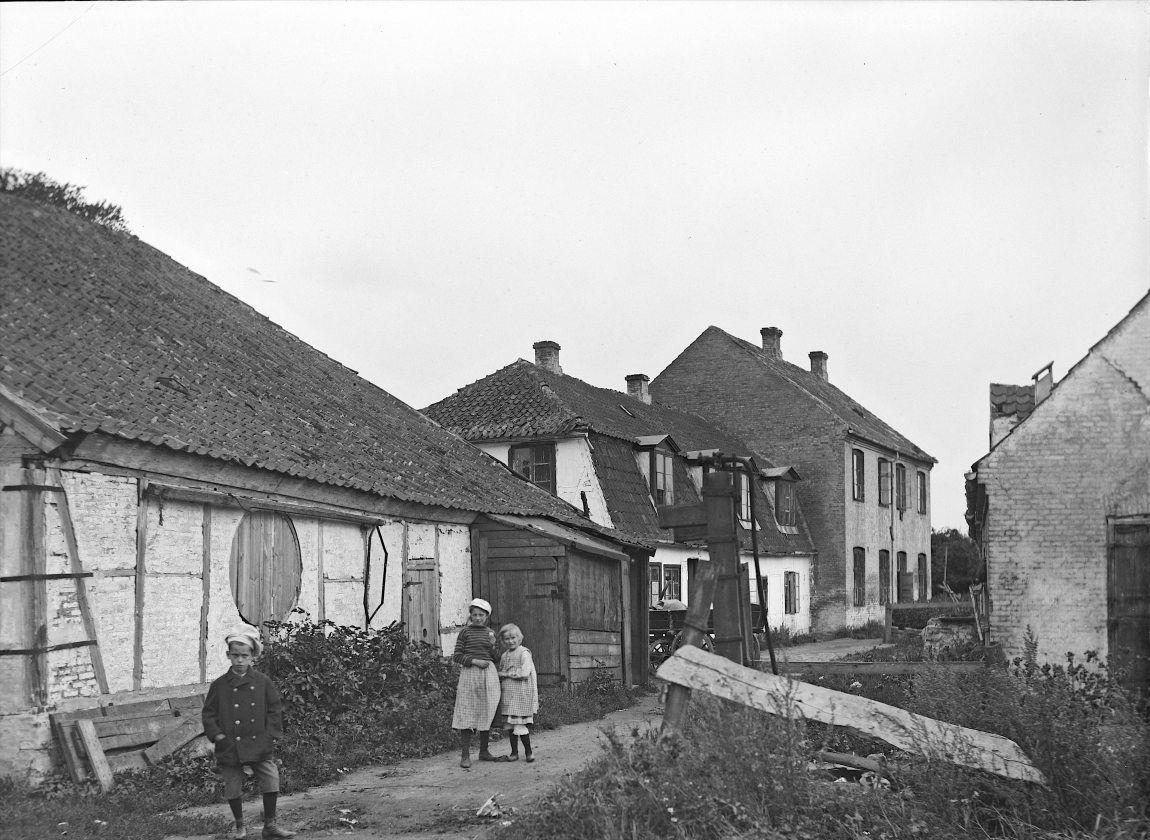
No. 7–9: Grundtvigs Højskole

The street originates in an old country lane that connected Tagensvej and Lyngbyvej across Rådmandsmarken. Grundtvigs Højskole, a folk high school, opened in an old farm by the road on 3 November 1856. The folk high school was given the name Marielyst after N.F.S. Grundtvig's second wife, Marie Toft, and was financed through a public collection on the occasion of Grundtvig's 70th birthsday. It relocated to Lyngby Agricultural School's former premises in 1890.

The street received its current name in 1880. A masterplan for redevelopment of the surrounding area was created but the area was at the turn of the century still dominated by market gardens.

The northernmost part of the street turned east to meet Lyngbyvej in a right angle. This short section of the street was renamed Ragnagade in 1920. Haraldsgade was instead continued straight northeastwards to meet Lyngbyvej a little further to the north. This new section of the street was initially given the name Ny Haraldsgade ("New Harald Street") but renamed Haraldsgade in 1930.

Lauritz Knudsen, a manufacturer of electric watches and other appliances, established a factory at No. 53 in 1932. It existed until 1968.

== Notable buildings and residents ==
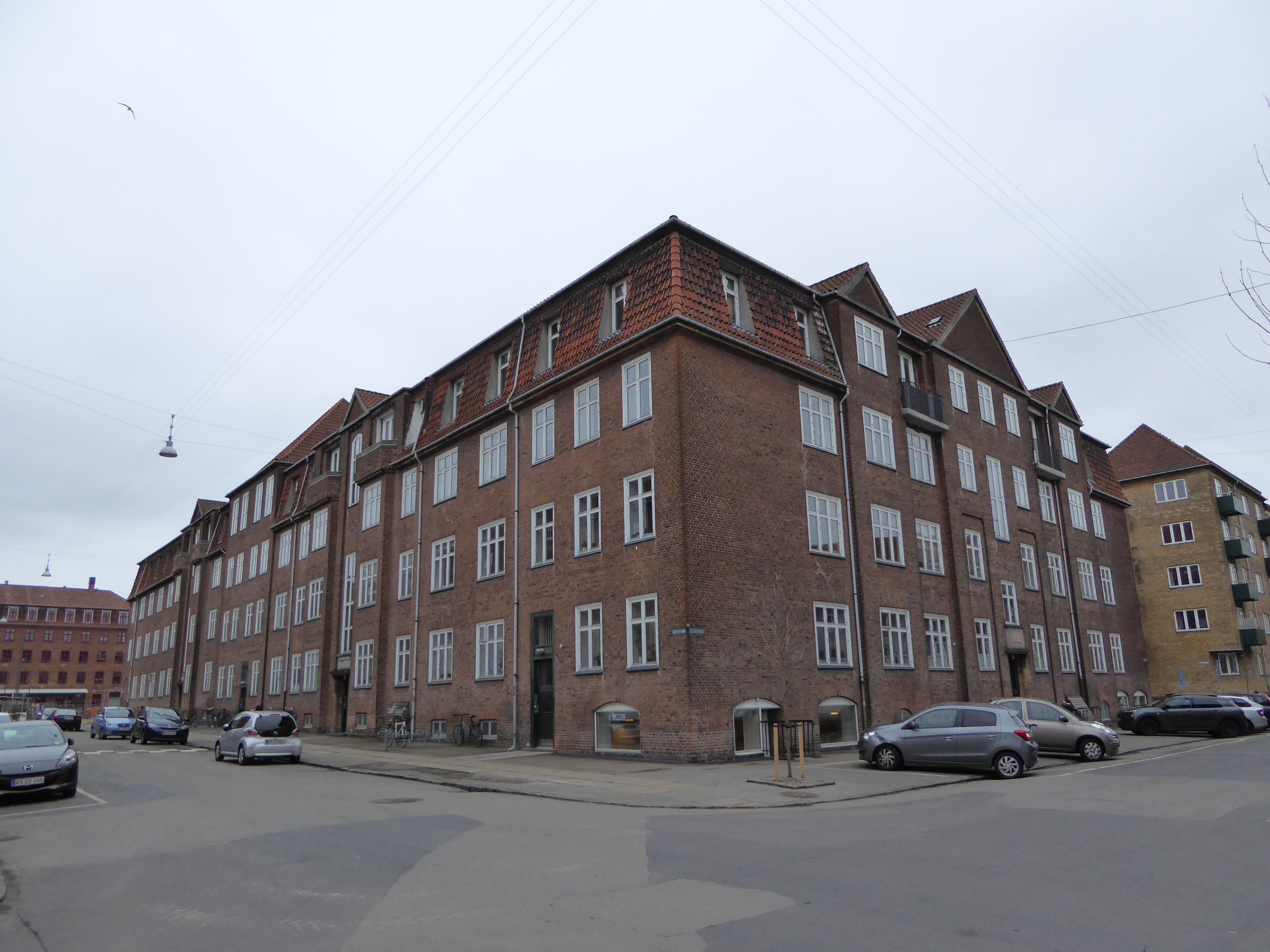
No. 7–9]AB Brynhilde

One of the older apartment buildings in the street is Haraldsgade 7–9. The building is from 1912 to 1915 and was designed by Charles Jacob Schou.

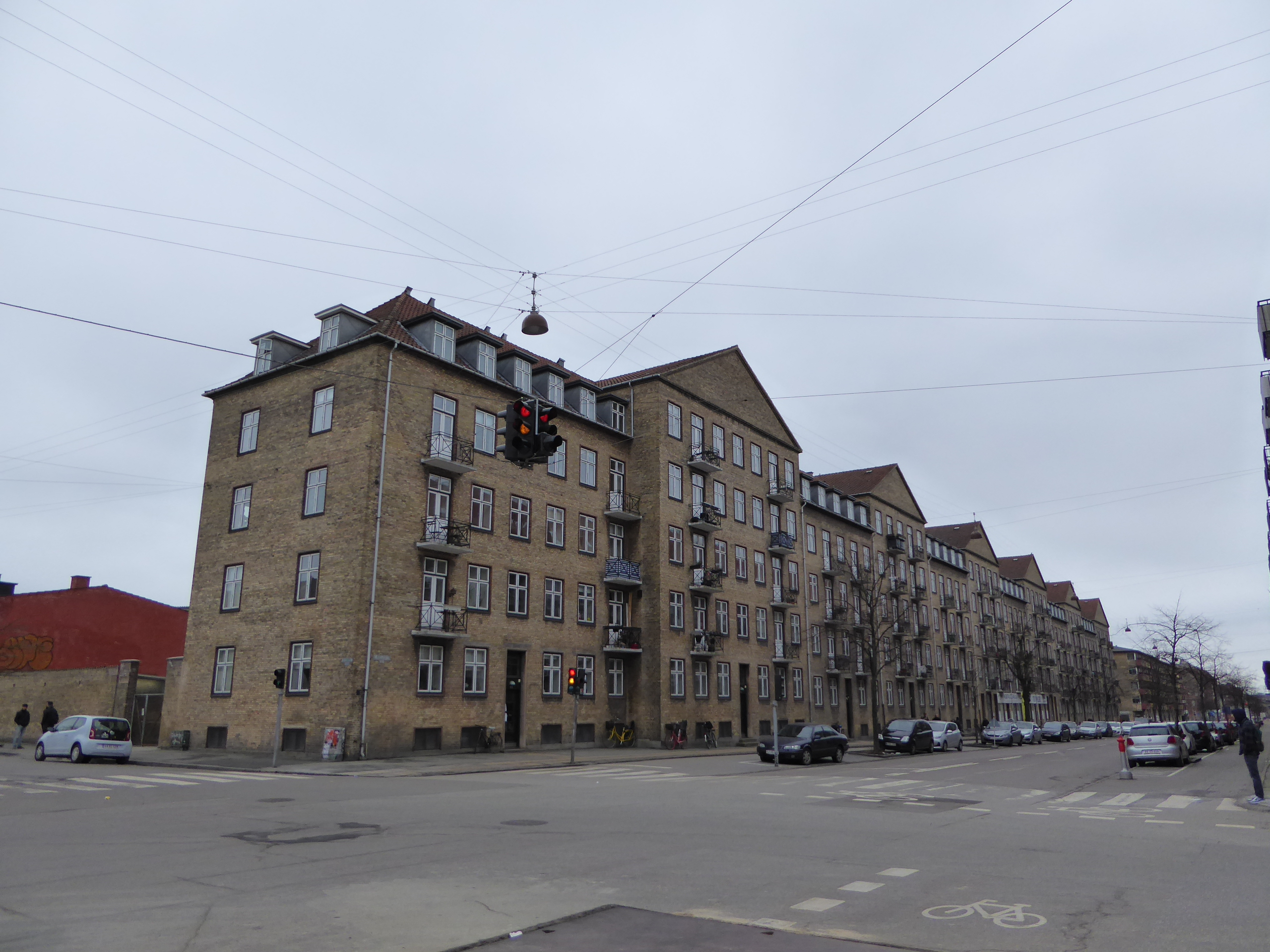
Np. 8:Haraldshus

The housing dev elopement at Haraldsgade 8 is from 1936 and was designed by Arthur Wittmaack and Vilhelm Hvalsøe.

At the northern end of the street is a development of so-called building association houses constructed by Arbejdernes Byggeforening to provide affordable housing for working-class families. A number of other such developments are scattered across the city. It was constructed in 1931-1932 and is thus one of the youngest of these developments. The architect was Christen Larsen.

== Public art ==
A memorial was in 1956 unveiled at the site where Grundtvigs Højskole (Marielyst Højskole) was once located. It was designed by Hans Wilhelm Larsen and Tue Myling-Petersen and.

Larva a granite sculpture by Lily Troelsø Borring meant for children to vlinmb on, was installed at the entrance to Haraldsgade Post Office (Studsgårdsgade 1) in 1993.

== Transport ==
Skjolds Plads Station, a Copenhagen Metro City Circle Line station, is located at the beginning of the street. The main staircase is located in the central reservation of the street and faces Tagensvej. A secondary staircase is located at Skjolds Plads.

== See also ==
- Rådmandsgade
