= Trianglen station =

Copenhagen metro station

Trianglen
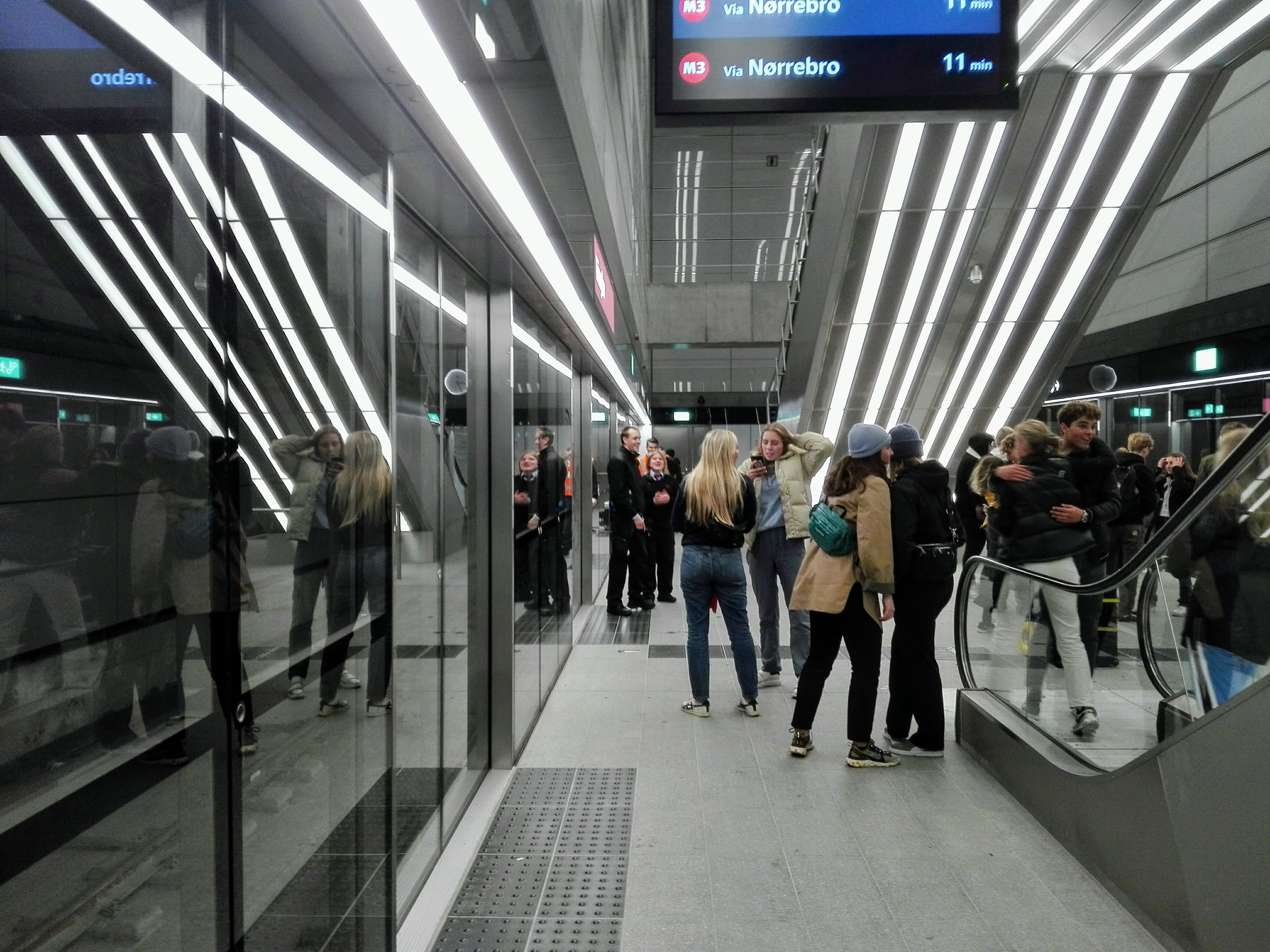

General information
- Location: Trianglen, 2100 Copenhagen Ø Copenhagen Municipality
- Coordinates: 55°41′57″N 12°34′33″E
- System: Copenhagen Metro Station
- Owner: Metroselskabet
- Platforms: 1 island platform
- Tracks: 2

Construction
- Structure type: Underground
- Accessible: Yes

Other information
- Station code: Tri
- Fare zone: 1

History
- Opened: 29 September 2019
Location
- Location within Copenhagen Location within Greater Copenhagen Location within Denmark

Trianglen station is Copenhagen Metro station located at Trianglen (literally 'The Triangle'), at the corner of Blegdamsvej and Øster Allé, in the Østerbro district of Copenhagen, Denmark. The station is on the City Circle Line (M3), between Østerport and Poul Henningsens Plads, and is in Zone 1. The station is situated in front one of the entrances to Fælled Park and approximately 400 metres (1,300 ft) from the Parken Stadium.

The station is underground. It was opened on 29 September 2019 together with 16 other stations of the line.

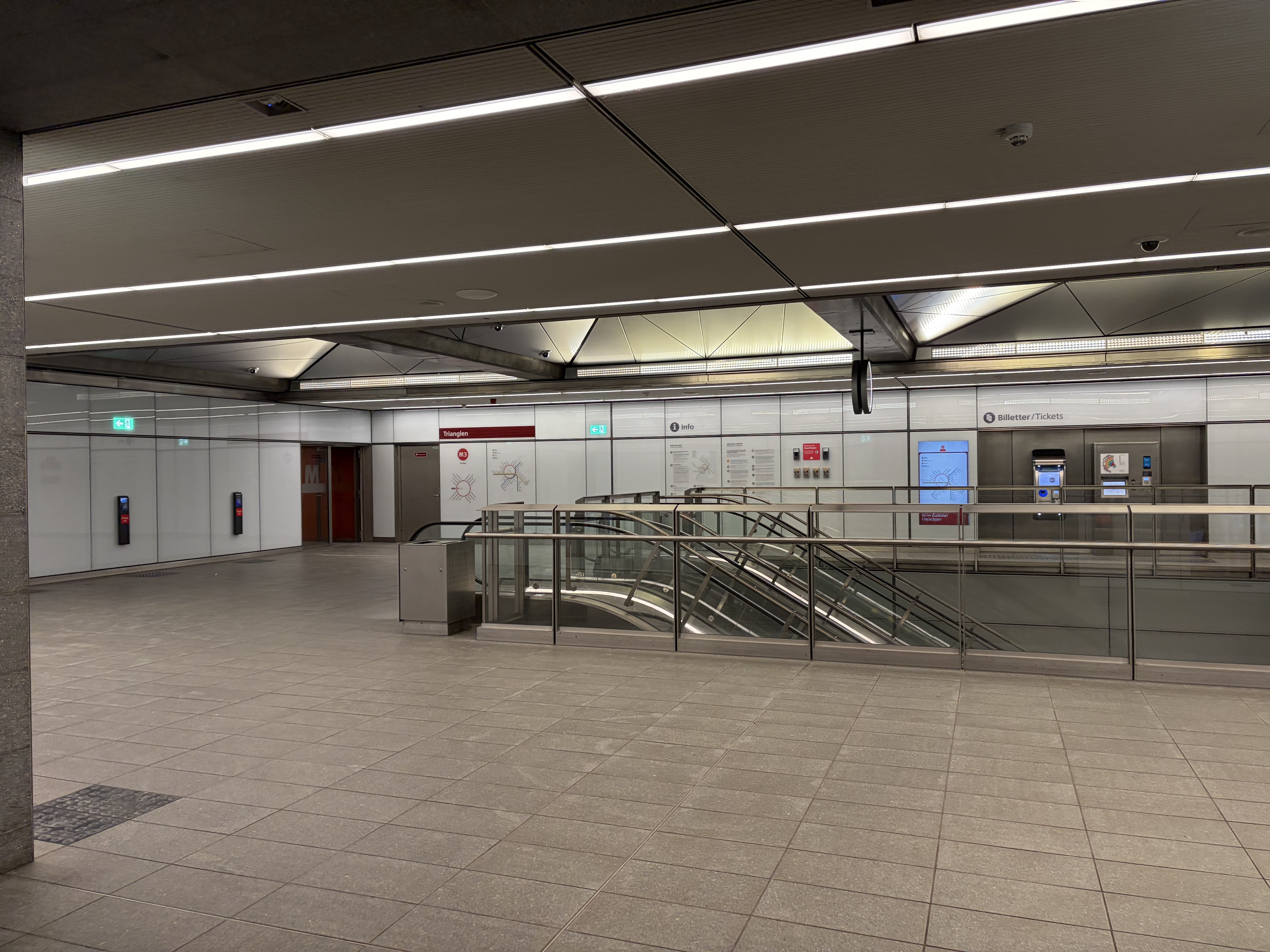
Inside the station at circulation level.

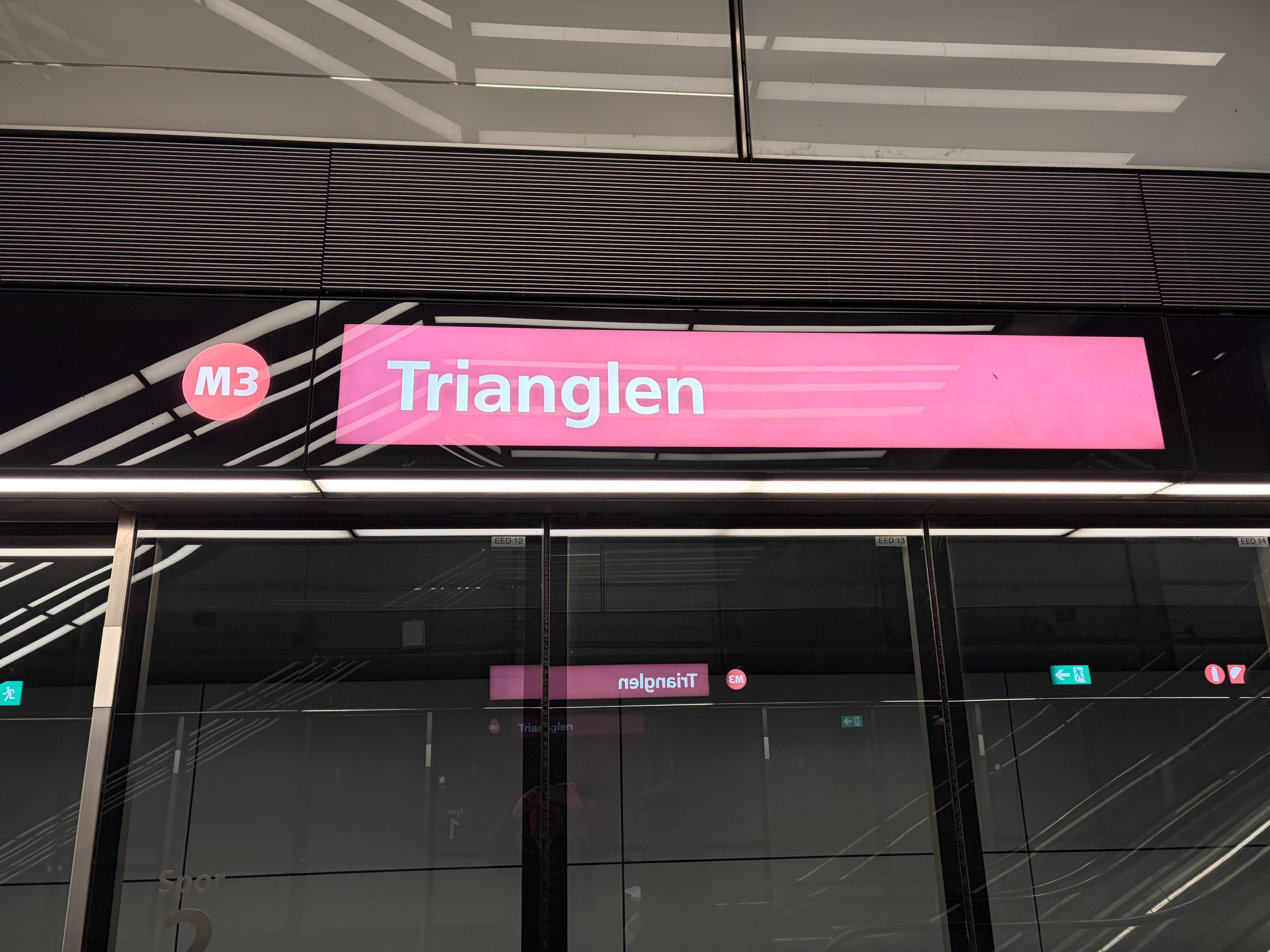
Signage at platform level.

Preceding station	Copenhagen Metro	Following station
Østerport clockwise	M3	Poul Henningsens Plads counter-clockwise
