= Rådmandsgade =

Street in Copenhagen Municipality, Denmark

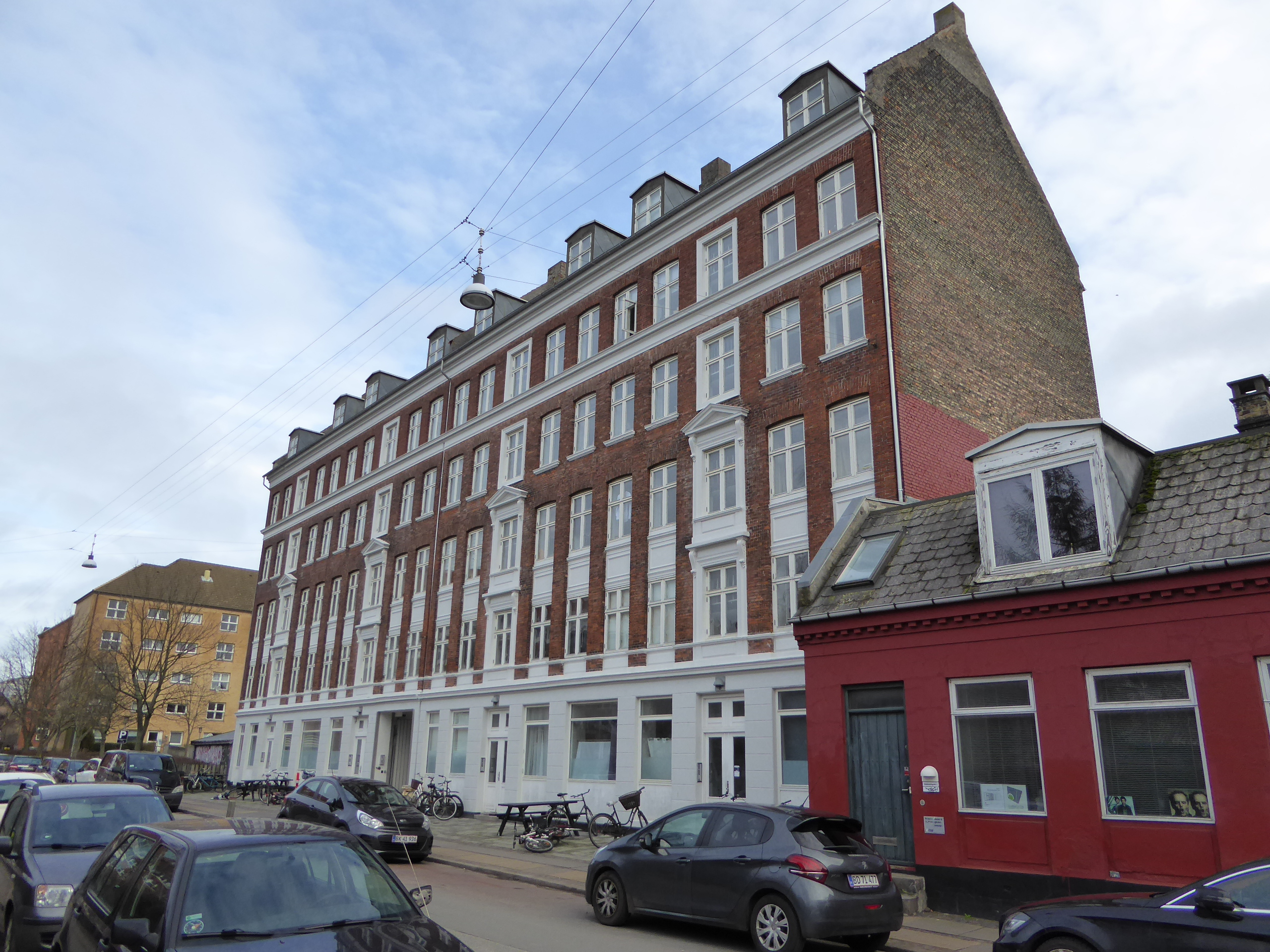
- Length: 935 m (3,068 ft)
- Location: Copenhagen, Denmark
- Quarter: Nørrebro
- Postal code: 2200
- Nearest metro station: Skjolds Plads
- Coordinates: 55°41′59.9″N 12°33′8″E
- Southwest end: DagmarsgadeBro
- Major junctions: Tagensvej
- Northeast end: Lersø Park Allé

Rådmandsgade (lit. 'Councilman Street') is a street in the Outer Nørrebro district of Copenhagen, Denmark. It runs from Dagmarsgade in the southwest to Lersø Parkallé in the northeast and crosses Tagensvej on the way. Rådmandsgade School, a public primary school, is located in the street.

== History ==
The street is named after Rådmandsmarken (The Councilman Fielf), whose crops belonged to the councilmen of Copenhagen. The street, which then ended at Tagensvej, was load out when the building restrictions outside Copenhagen's fortifications were abandoned in the 1850s. It was named in 1860.

Lauritz Rasmussen's Zinc and Bronze Foundry opened at No. 15 in 1890. Many monuments, memorials and public artworks that were installed in Copenhagen over the next decades cast at the site in 1890.

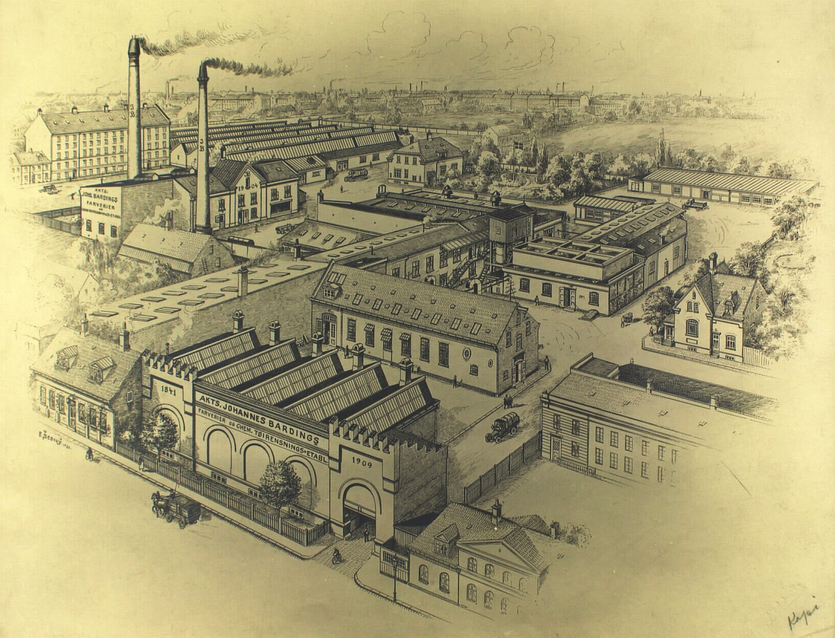
Johannes Barding's plant seen on a drawing by Franz Sedivý from 1922

Bardings Farveri og Tøjrensningsetablissement, which grew to become the largest dyeing and dry cleaning company in Scandinavia, was from around at the turn of the century based at the southern end of the street. The plant included administrative offices, route delivery racks, and room for the dry cleaning, spotting, finishing, and dyeing departments.

After the end of the First World War, Rådmandsgade was extended from Tagensvej to Lersøparkallé. The sculptor Astrid Noack lived and worked in the courtyard at No. 34 in the period 1936–50.

== Notable buildings and residents ==
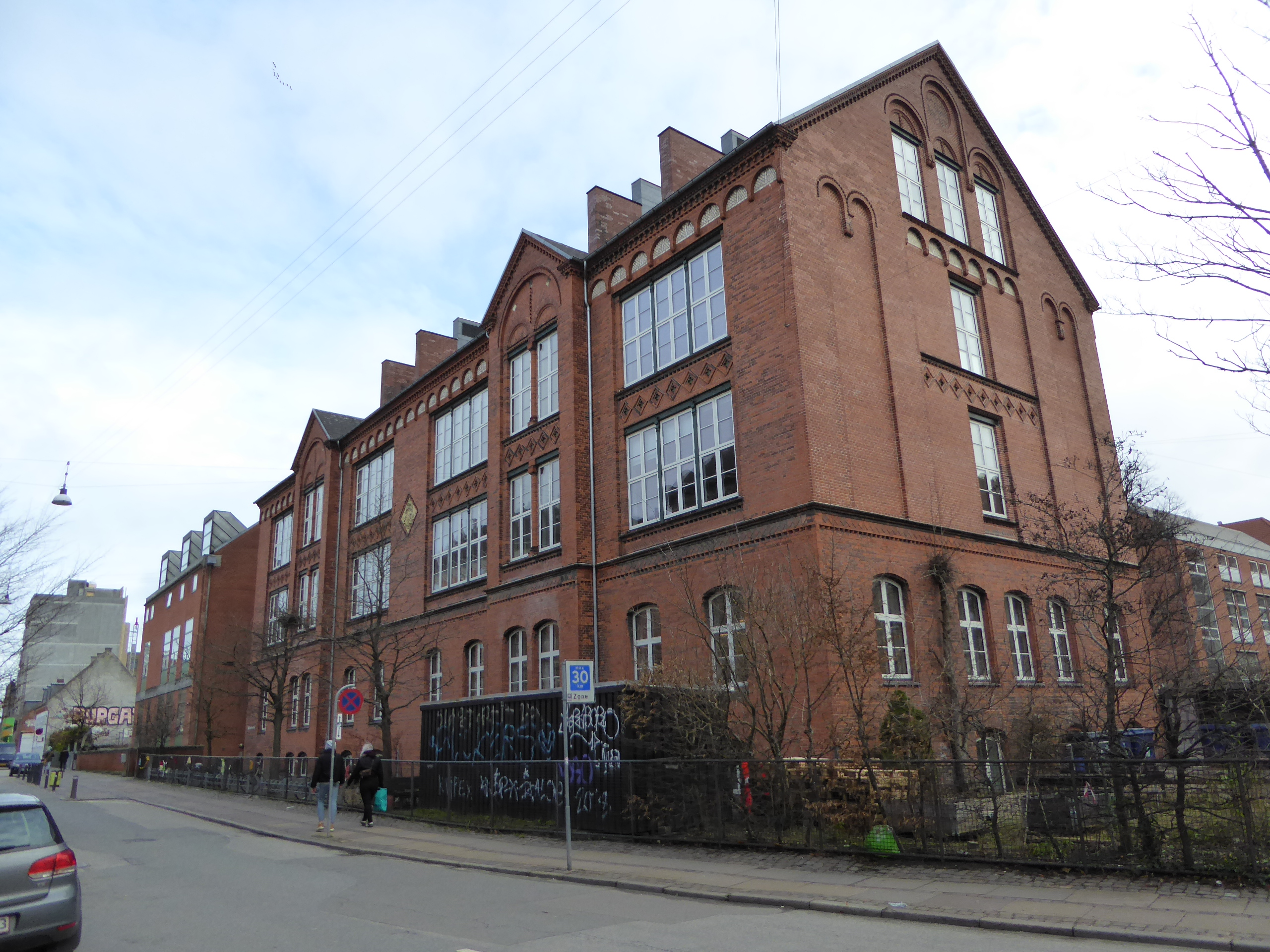
No. 22: Rådmandsgade School

Rådmandsgade School (No. 22) is a public primary school. It was built in 1889 to design by city architect Ludvig Fenger.

No. 45 is a former liver peté factory. The block at Jagtvej 157 A-G/Skrivergangen/Lersø Parkallé/Rådmandsgade 84 was built by the City in 1928. It was designed by Louis Hygom.

== Transport ==
The Skjolds Plads City Circle Line station is located approximately 385 metres from the street along Tagensvej.

== See also ==
- Heimdalsgade
