= Vibenshus Runddel station =

Copenhagen metro station

Vibenshus Runddel
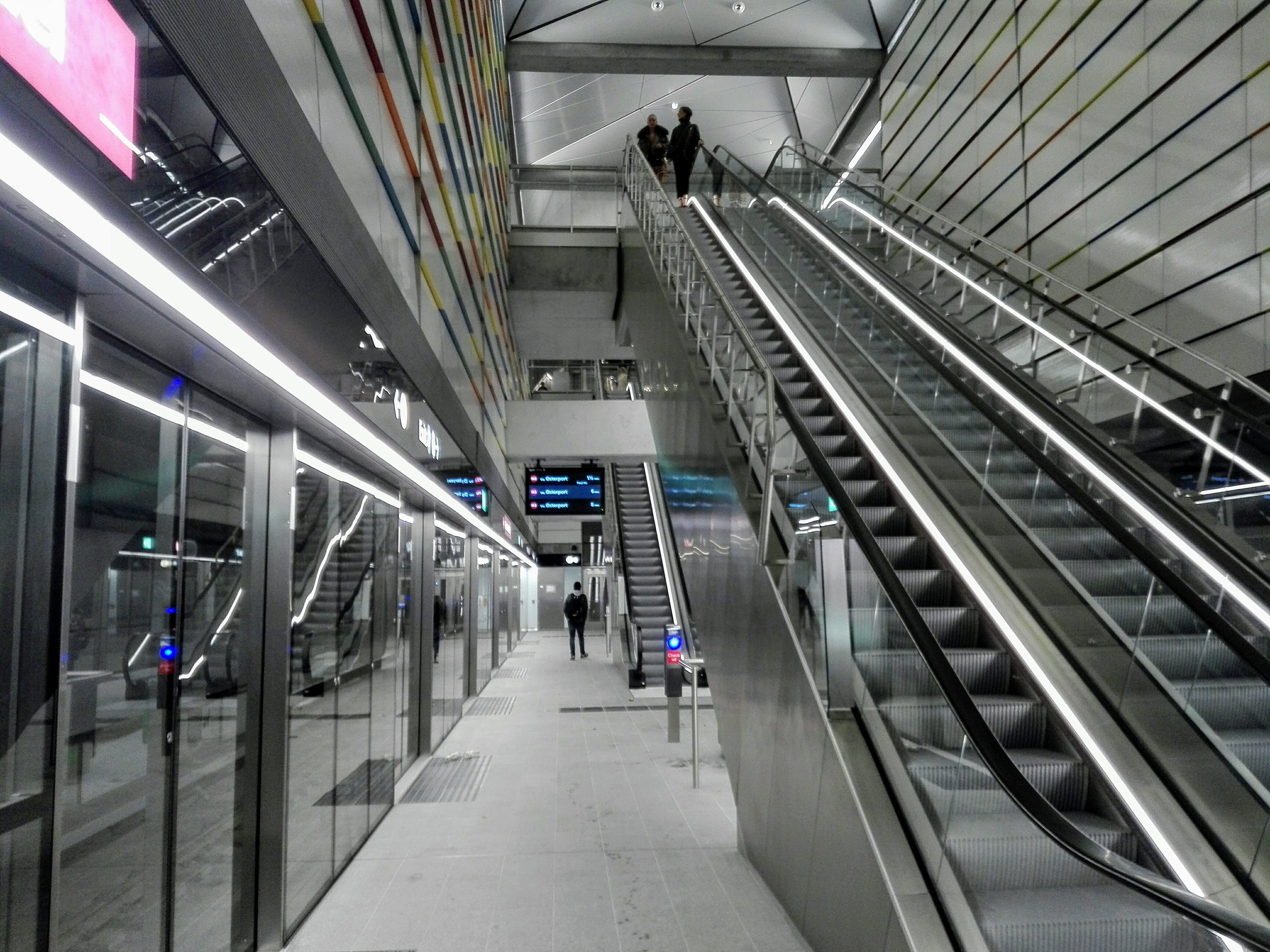

General information
- Location: Jagtvej, 2100 Copenhagen Ø Copenhagen Municipality; Denmark
- Coordinates: 55°42′22.5″N 12°33′50.9″E
- System: Copenhagen Metro Station
- Owner: Metroselskabet
- Platforms: 1 island platform
- Tracks: 2
- Bus routes: 150S, 15E, 14, 184, 185, 194N

Construction
- Structure type: Underground
- Accessible: Yes

Other information
- Station code: Vhr
- Fare zone: 2

History
- Opened: 29 September 2019; 7 years ago
Location
- Location within Copenhagen Location within Greater Copenhagen Location within Denmark

Vibenshus Runddel station is an underground Copenhagen Metro station located at Vibenshus Runddel, at the corner of Jagtvej and Nørre Allé, in the Outer Østerbro district of Copenhagen, Denmark. The station is on the City Circle Line (M3), between Poul Henningsens Plads and Skjolds Plads, and is in Zone 2.

== History ==
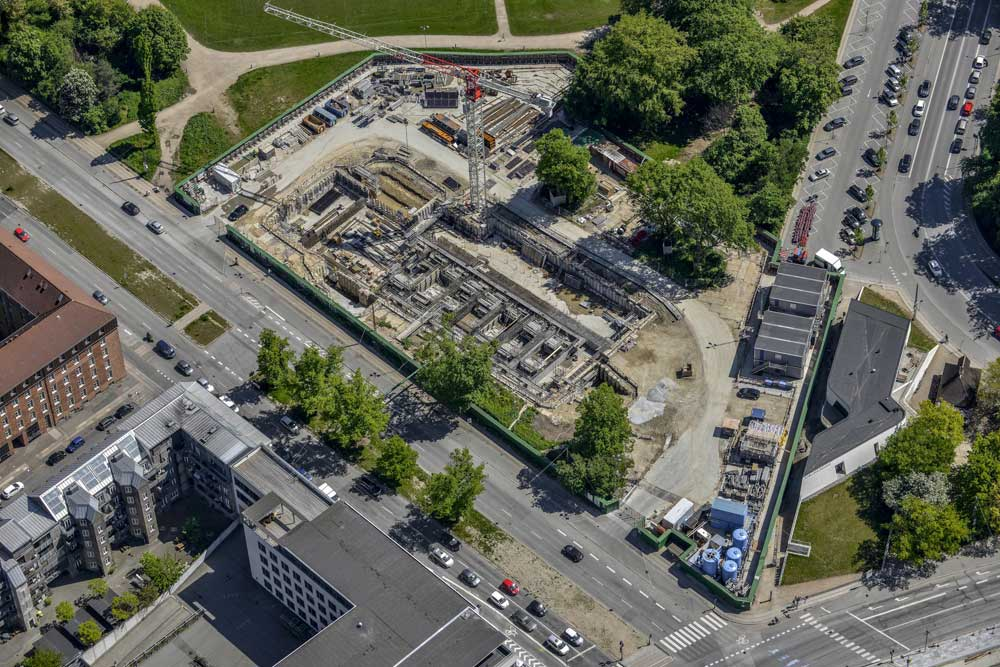
The station under construction

Preparations such as wire work and archeological excavations began ultimo 2010 and construction work began ultimo 2012. The station was opened on 29 September 2019 together with 16 other stations of the line.

== Design ==
The main staircase faces Vibenhus Runddel and a secondary emergency staircase faces the other way. The escalator shaft is clad with white panels with exposed undersides in the colours yellow, green, blue, red and orange. The colours are a reference to nearby Fælledparken.

== Service ==
| Preceding station | Copenhagen Metro | Following station |
|---|---|---|
| Poul Henningsens Plads clockwise | M3 | Skjolds Plads counter-clockwise |
