= Poul Henningsens Plads station =

Copenhagen metro station

Poul Henningsens Plads
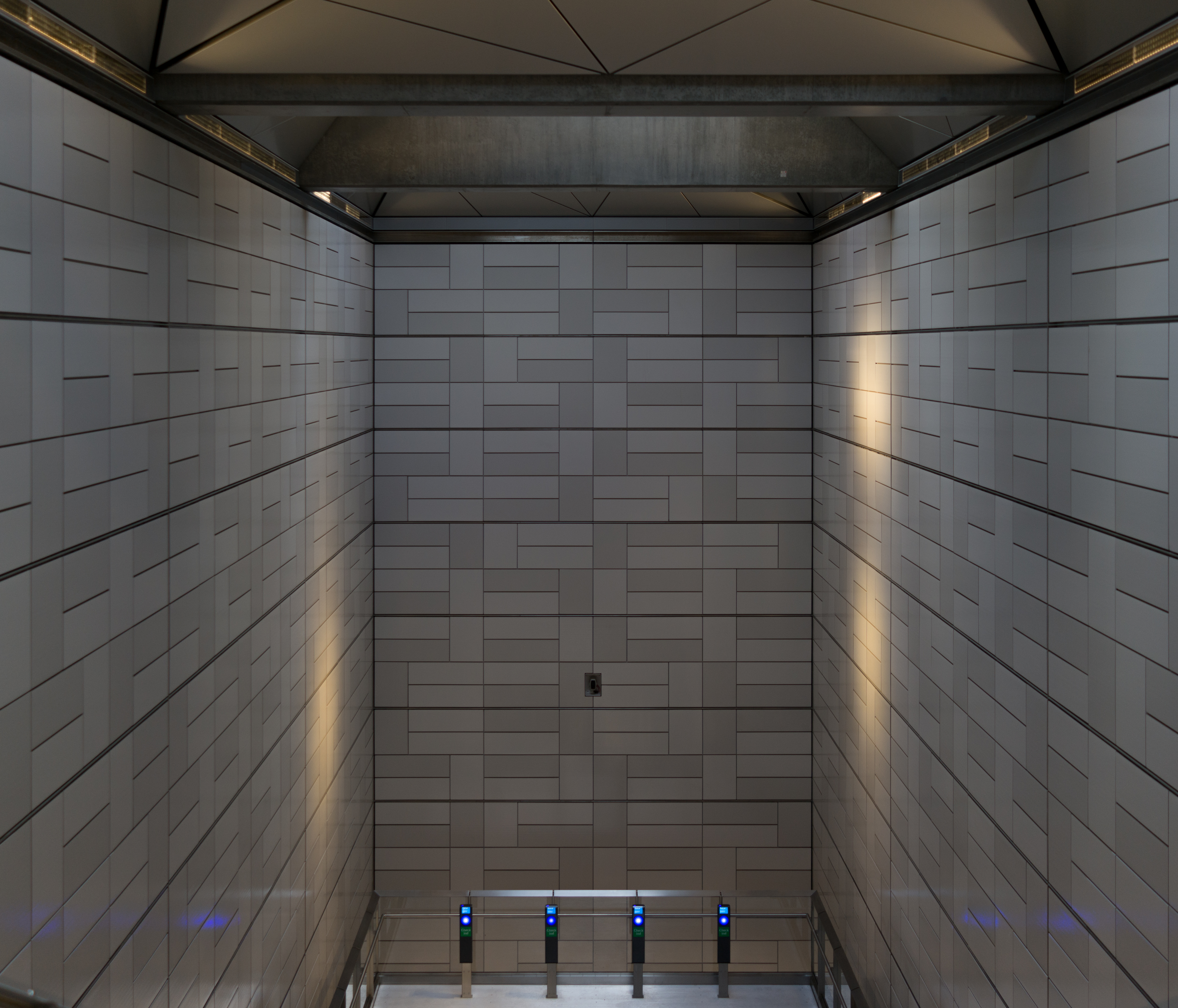

General information
- Location: Reersøgade, 2100 Copenhagen Ø Copenhagen Municipality
- Coordinates: 55°42′33.2″N 12°34′35.1″E
- System: Copenhagen Metro Station
- Owner: Metroselskabet
- Platforms: 1 island platform
- Tracks: 2
- Bus routes: 14, 23, 1A

Construction
- Structure type: Underground
- Accessible: Yes

Other information
- Station code: Php
- Fare zone: 2

History
- Opened: 29 September 2019; 7 years ago
Location
- Location within Copenhagen Location within Greater Copenhagen Location within Denmark

Poul Henningsens Plads station is an underground Copenhagen Metro station located close to Poul Henningsens Plads in the Østerbro district of Copenhagen, Denmark. The station is on the City Circle Line (M3), between Trianglen and Vibenshus Runddel, and is in Zone 2. It is situated at the corner of Tåsingegade and Reersøgade with a main entrance that faces Jagtvej.

== History ==
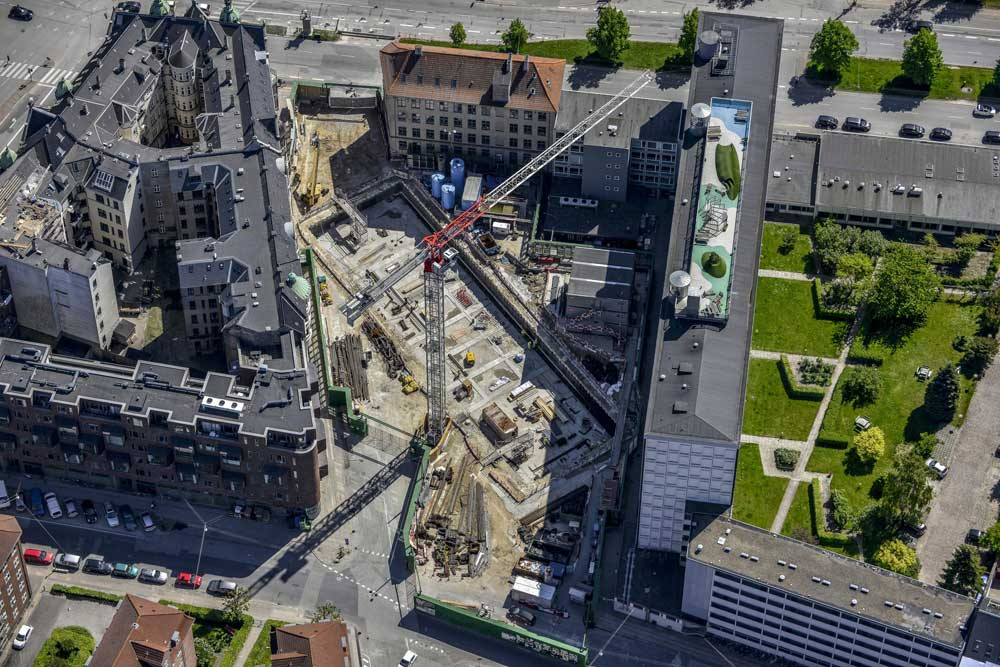
The station under construction in 2014

The station was originally supposed to be located under Poul Henningsens Plads but was during the planning process relocated to an unnamed space at the corner of Tåsingegade and Reersøgade. The initial preparations with wire work and archeological excavations started in May 2011 and construction work of the station started in early 2013. The station is underground. It was opened on 29 September 2019 together with 16 other stations of the line.

== Service ==
Preceding station	Copenhagen Metro	Following station
Trianglen clockwise	M3	Vibenshus Runddel counter-clockwise
