= Tagensvej =

Street in Copenhagen

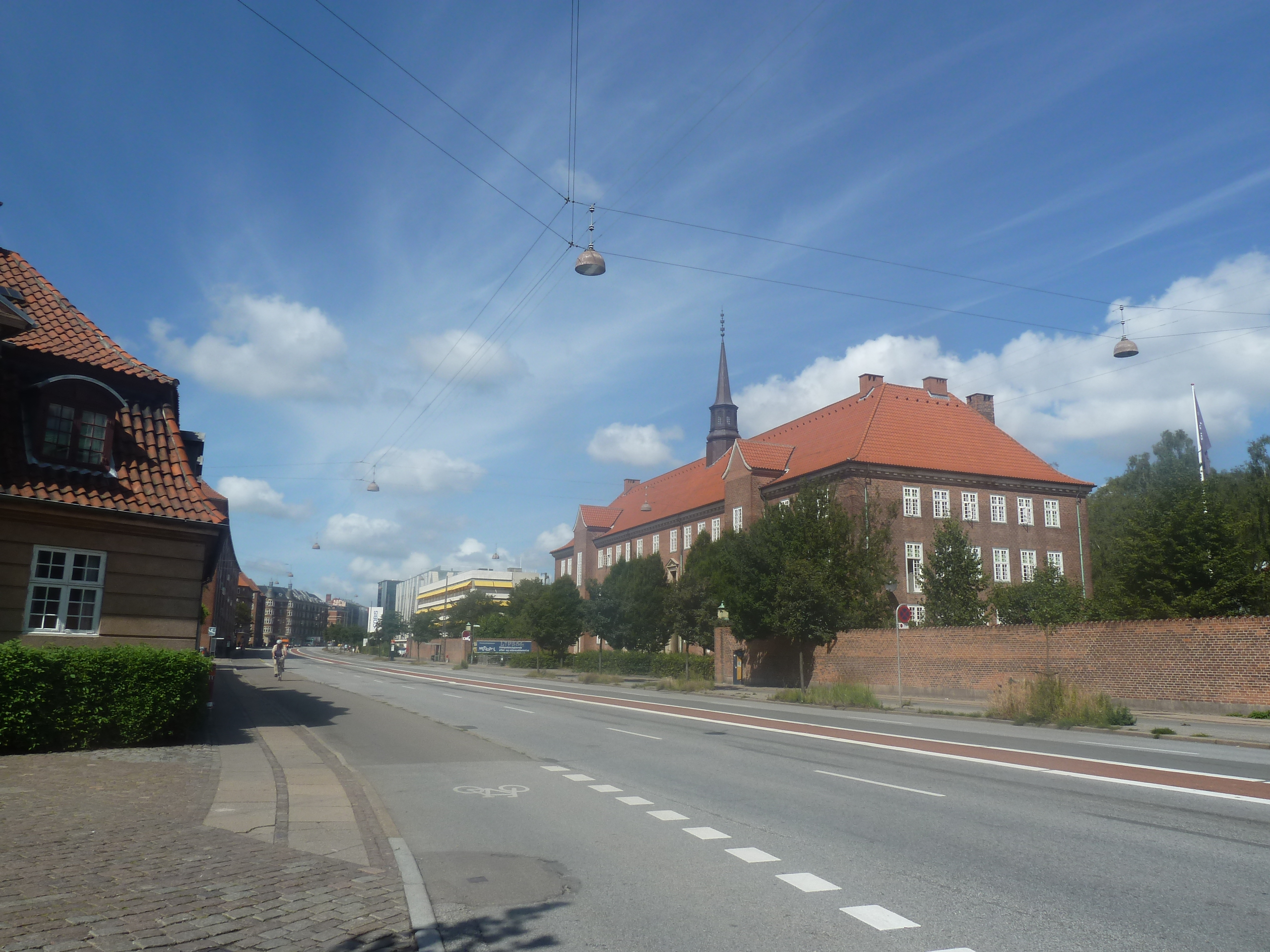
- Length: 3,380 m (11,090 ft)
- Location: Copenhagen, Denmark
- Quarter: Nørrebro, Bispebjerg
- Postal code: 2200, 2400
- Nearest metro station: Nørrebro station
- Coordinates: 55°42′18.72″N 12°35′12.12″E
- Southeast end: Fredensgade
- Major junctions: Blegdamsvej, Nørre Allé, Jagtvej. Frederiksborgvej
- Northwest end: Biepebjerg Torv

Tagensvej is a major street in the northwestern part of inner Copenhagen, Denmark. It runs from Blegdamsvej on the border between Nørrebro and Østerbro in the southeast to Frederiksborgvej and Bispebjerg Cemetery in the northwest.

== History ==
=== Origins ===
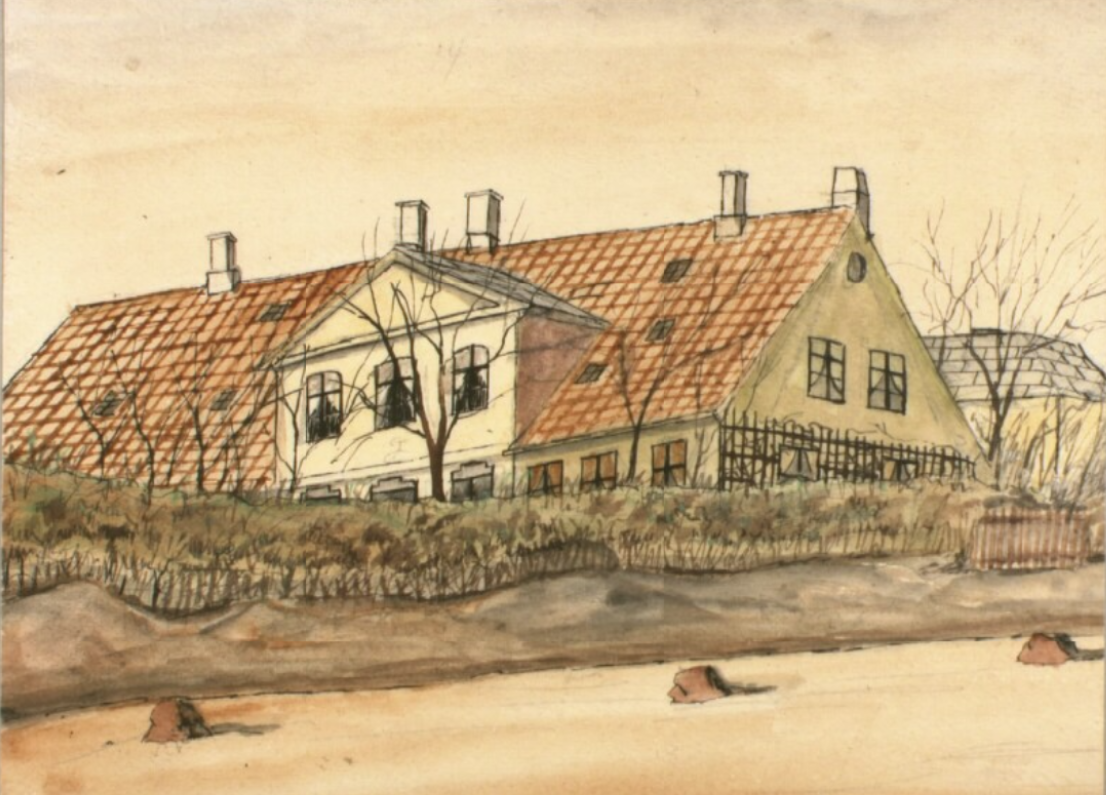
Tagenshus in 1884

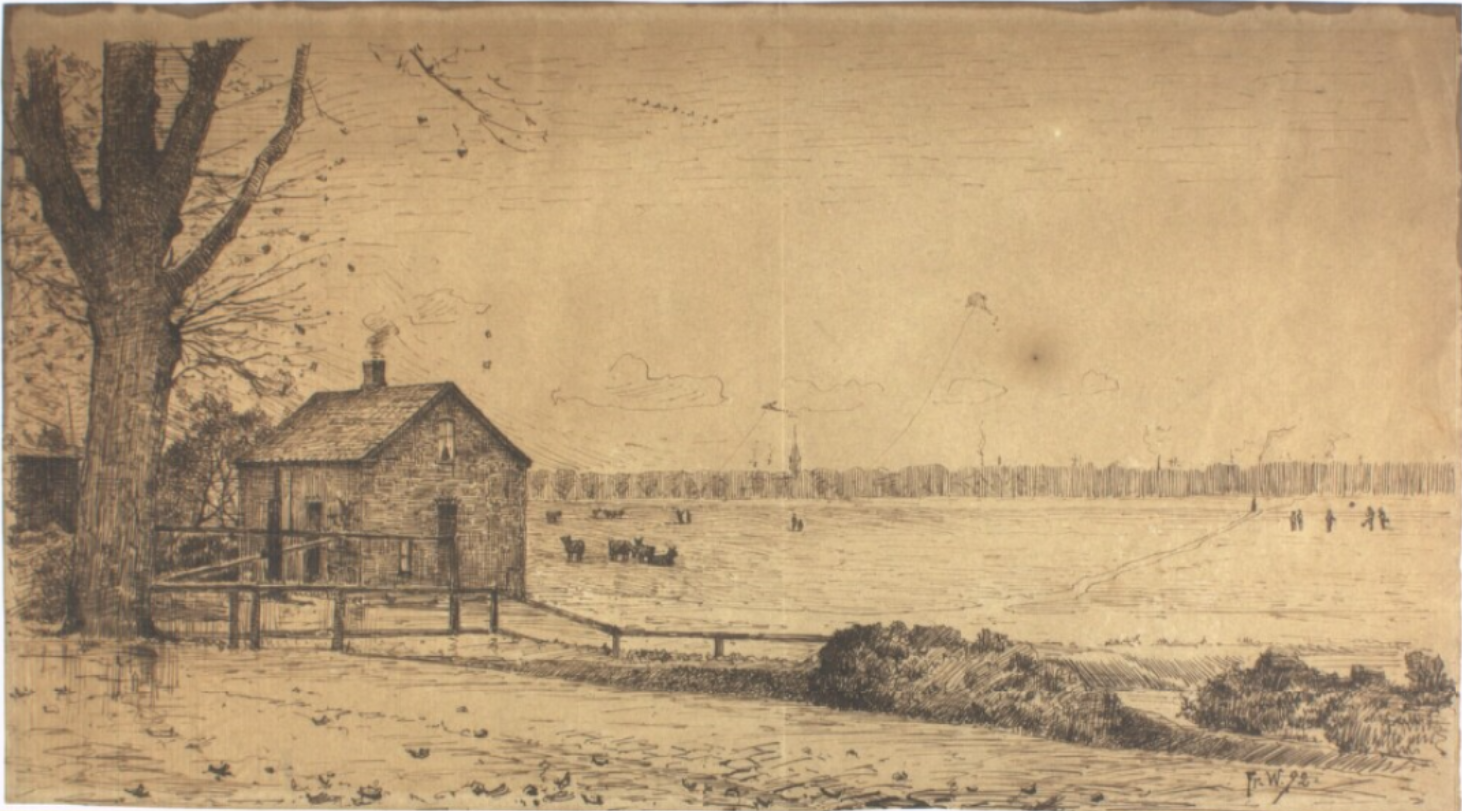
A view of Nørre Fælled from Tagensvej towards Østerbro, 1892

The road takes its name after Tagenshus, a house located just north of the junction with Jagtvej from 1631. Built as residence for the attendant of Borgmestervangen and Rådmandsvangen, two pastures available to the mayors of Copenhagen, it received its name after a Tage Nielsen who died in 1704. A so-called bird's pole (Danish: Fuglestang) had already been installed at the site in 1616. It was used for the king's falcons and later also for ceremonial shootings and as the location of illegal duels.

=== Late 19th century industrial development ===
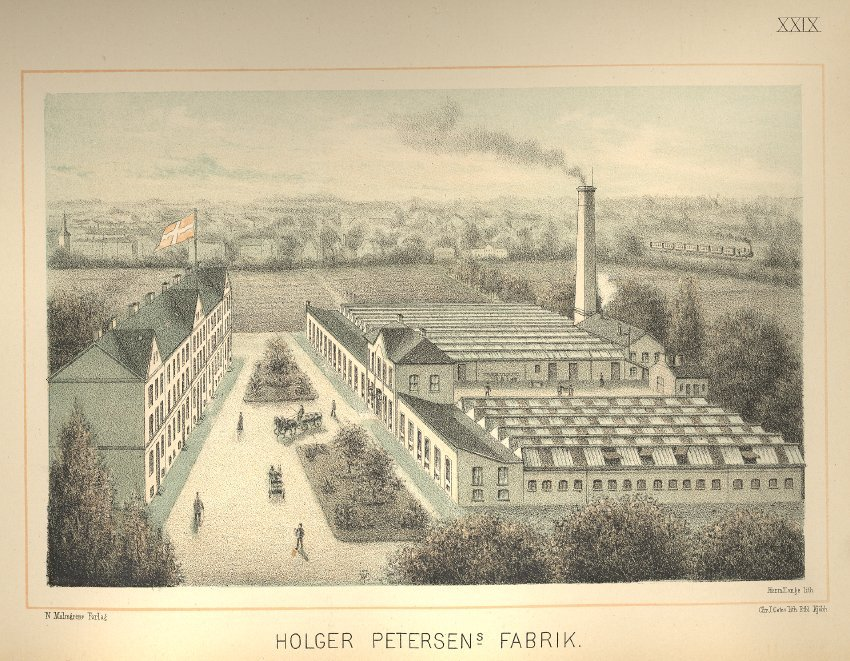
Holger Petersen's Textile Factory

Tagensvej was originally only a track that linked Jagtvej with the Lersøen lake to the northwest. The area between Blegdamsvej and Jagtvej was still a military area when industrial enterprises began relocating to the road in the 1880s. Holger Petersen's textile factory occupied a new factory on the street in 1883. S. C. Hauberg established a machine factory on Tagensvej in 1885. Other early industrial enterprises were Københavns Saffiansfabriken, a manufacturer of goat's skin products founded in 1869, and Copenhagen's Horse Shoe Factory.

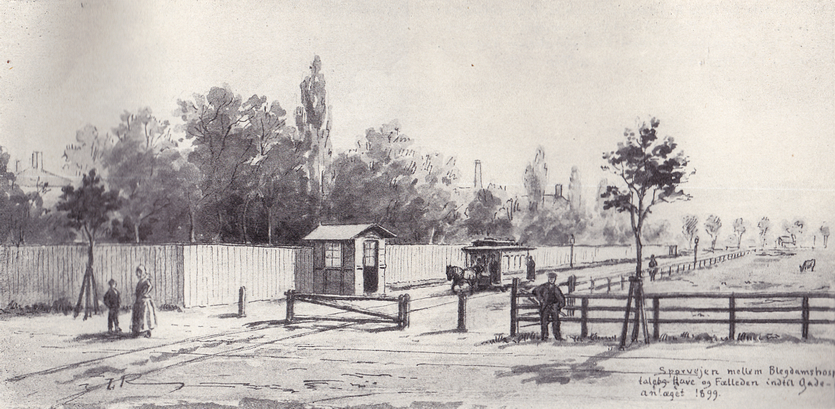
J. L. Ridter: Tagensvej at Blegdamsvej, 1903

Hauberg paid for a new embankment across Sortedam Lake and a horse-drawn tram line began operating between the city centre and his plant in 1887 but a road connection was not constructed until the army finally released the area in 1899. Tagensvej was extended to its current length in 1903 as part of the plans for the new Bispebjerg district.

Hauberg's machine factory merged with another enterprise under the name Titan in 1897.

== Notable buildings and residents ==
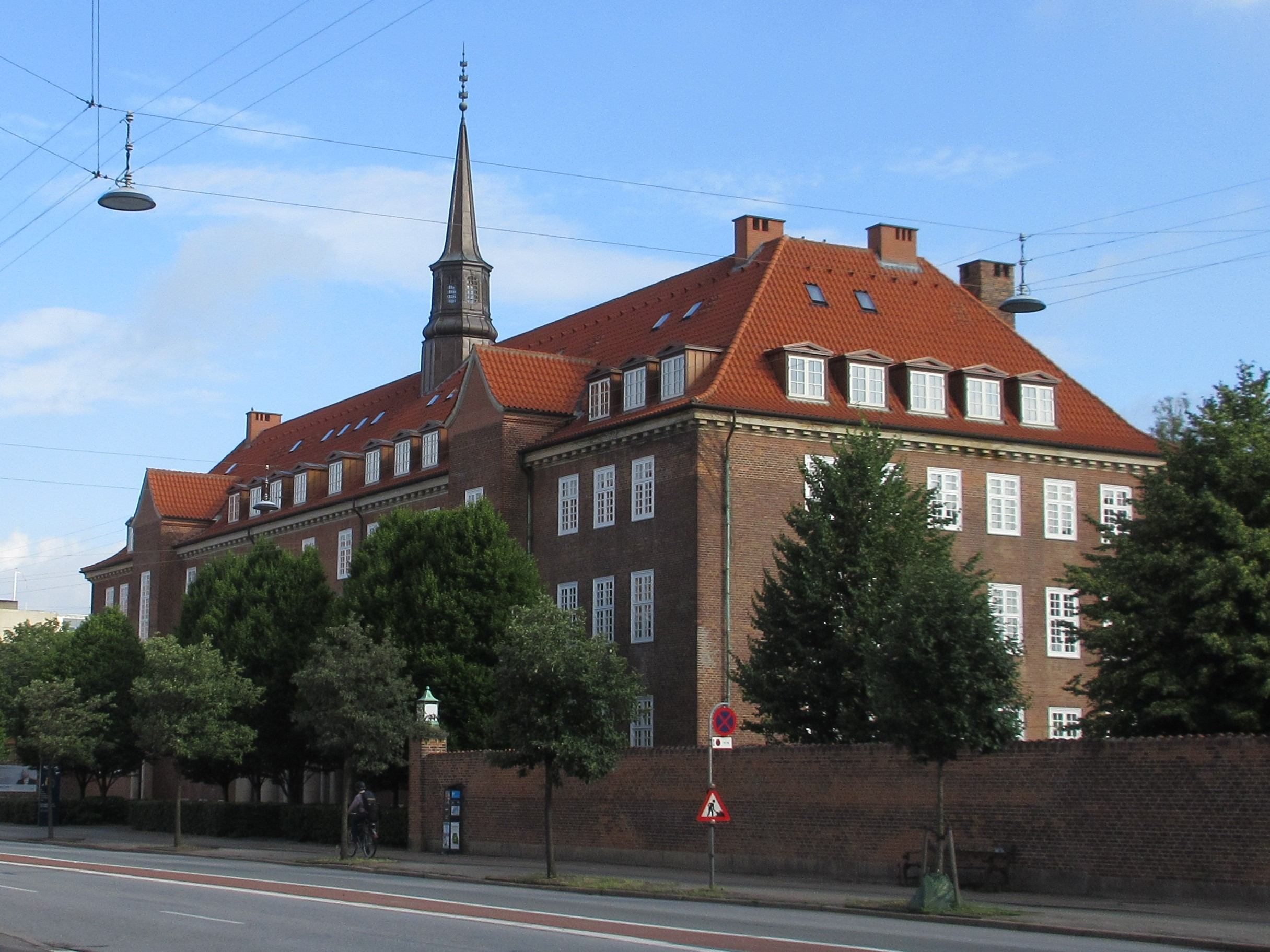
No. 18: University College Copenhagen

The first part of the street is dominated by Rigshospitalet, University of Copenhagen's North Campus and one of University College Copenhagen's campuses (No. 16). Buildings directly on the street include the Panum Building and the Faculty Library of Natural and Health Sciences (KUB Nord). Metropolitan UC's building at No. 18-20 is home to Copenhagen Military Hospital which was built in 1918–1928 to design by Gunnar Laage as a replacement for the Garrison Hospital in Rigensgade. Just off Tagensvej, on the new street Ole Maaløes Vej, is BRIC – Biotech Research and Innovation Centre

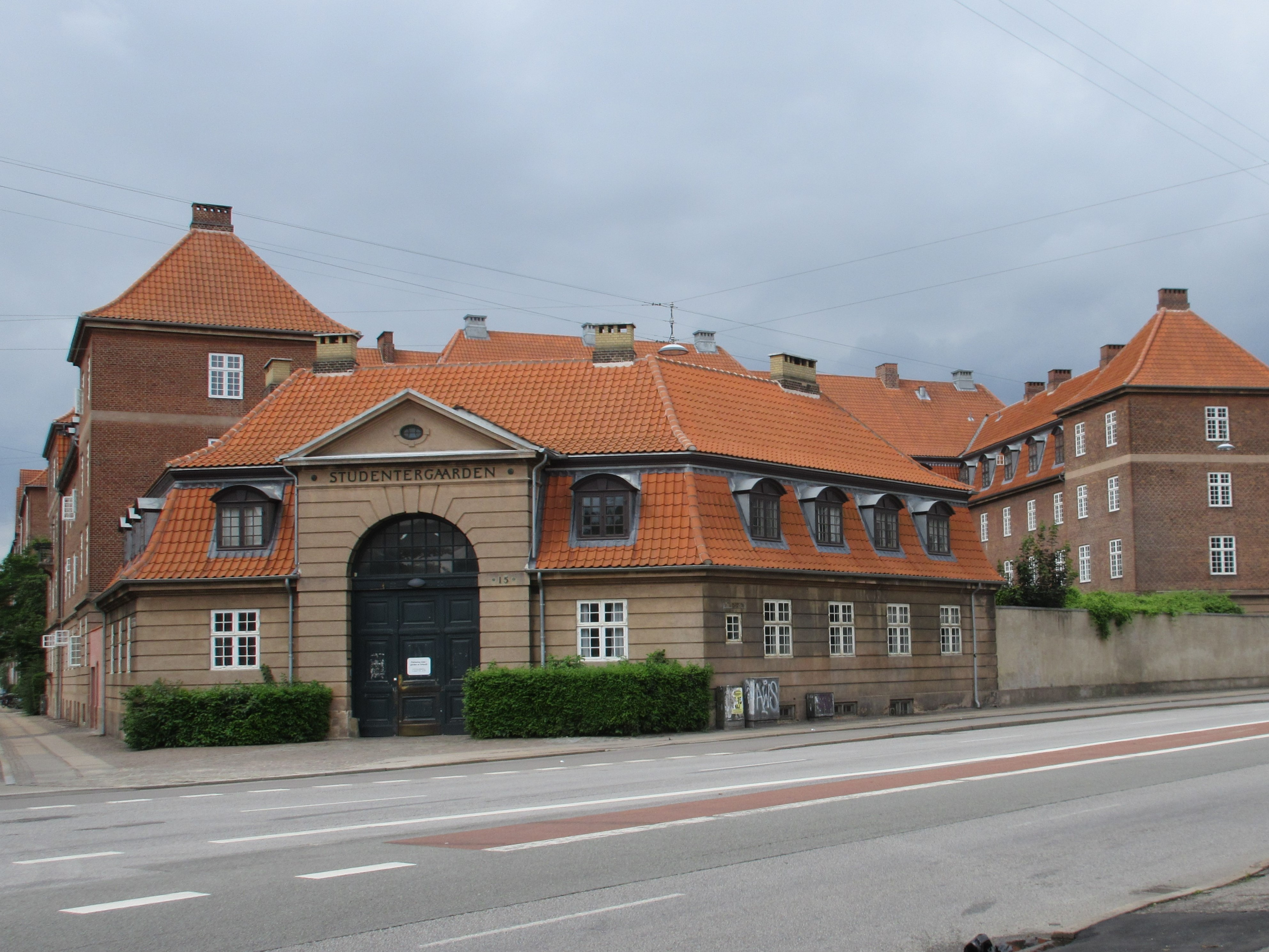
No. 15: Studentergården

The street is also home to several halls of residences. Studentergården (No. 15) with 140 dwellings built in 1923 to design by Martin Borch. Hollegiegården (No. 52B) with 168 rooms is from 1961.

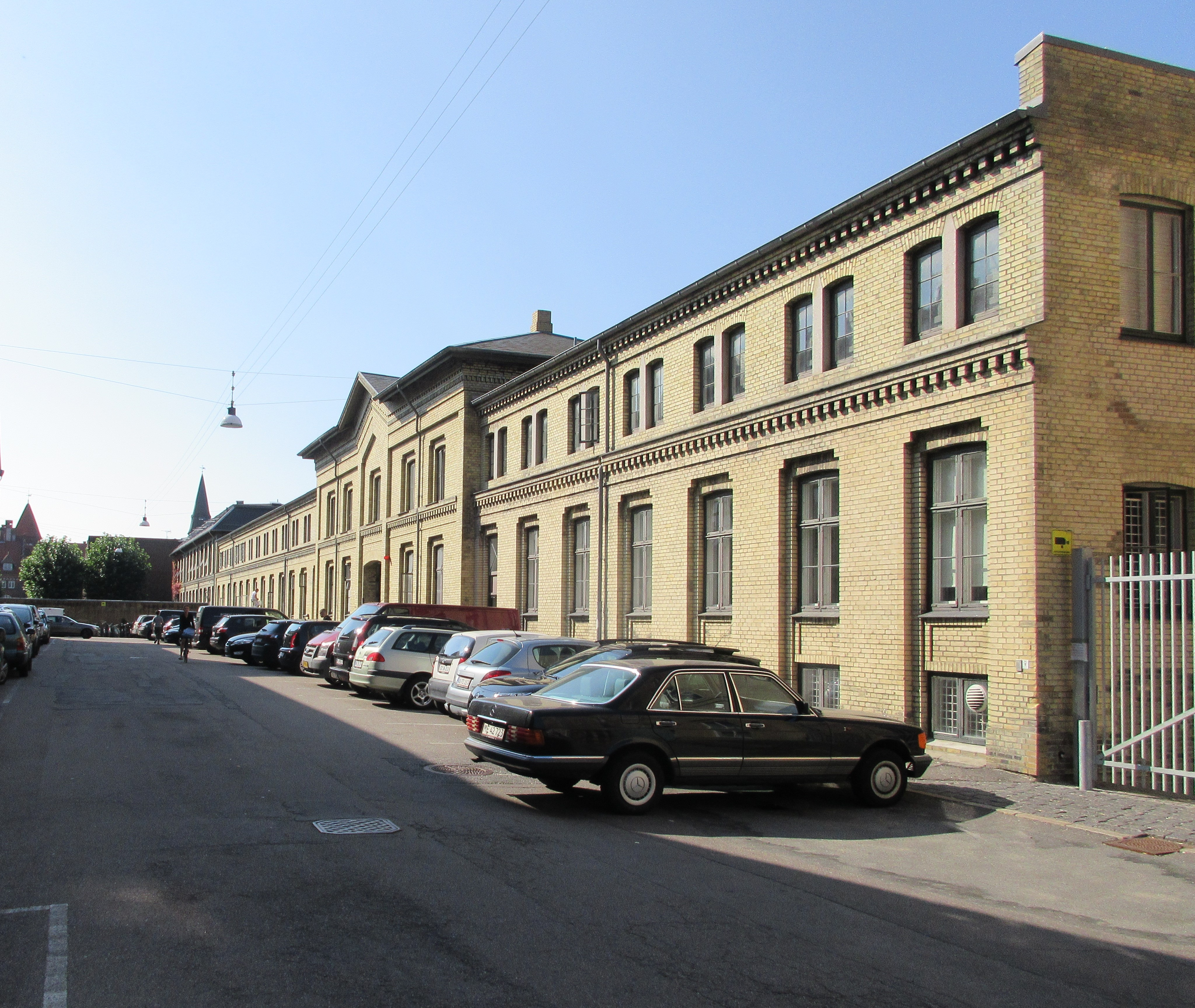
Holger Petersen's former textile factory

Holger Petersen's former textile manufactury at No. 85 was built in 1883 to design by Johan Schrøder and expanded by Bernhard Ingemann in 1905. The site also includes two terraces of workers' housing from 1885 which were also designed by Schrøder. The entire complex is listed. Bernhard Ingemann has also designed the neighbouring, Neo-Baroque apartment building from 1916 at No. 81.

The far end of the street is dominated by large housing estates. Located on the southwest side of Tagensveh and northwest of Tuborgvej, Bispeparken was with its 827 apartments the largest housing estate in Scandinavia at the time of its completion in 1941, The masterplan for the development was designed by Ivar Bentsen in collaboration with Kooperative Arkitekter while the individual buildings were designed by different architects. On the other side of Tagensvej, a little further north, is På Bjerget ("On the Hill"), a development of uniform houses which surrounds Grundtvig's Church. It was designed by Peder Vilhelm Jensen-Klint in collaboration with Vilhelm Wittrup, Charles I. Schou and Georg Gøssel, the buildings contain the parish hall and apartments and were built from 1924 to 1926.

== Public art ==
At Rigshospitalet, on the corner of Tagensvej with Blegdamsvej, stands Rudolph Tegner's large group sculpture Towards the Light. It was installed in 1909 as a memorial to the physician and scientist Niels Ryberg Finsen who won the Nobel Prize in Medicine and Physiology in 1903. On the gable of Tagensvej 52 is a mural by Jonas Hvid Søndergaard from 2012.

== Transport ==
Bispebjerg station is located at the far end of the street. It is served by the F trains on the Ring Line of the S-train network. Skjold Plads Station, served by Copenhagen Metro's City Circle Line, opened at the junction with Haraldsgade in September 2019.
