= Skjolds Plads station =

Copenhagen metro station

Skjolds Plads
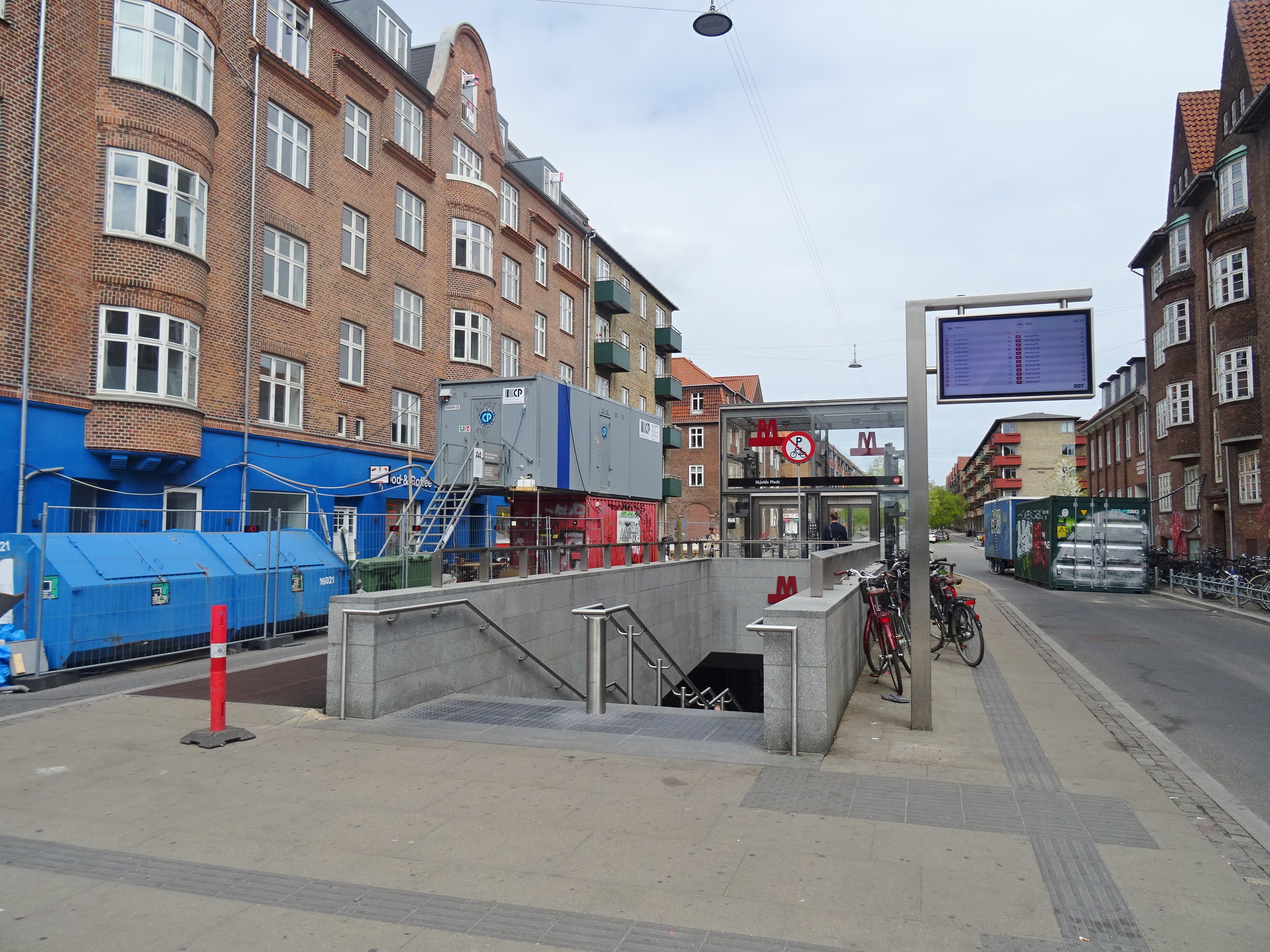
- Skjolds Plads station entrance

General information
- Location: Haraldsgade, 2200 Copenhagen N
- Coordinates: 55°42′11.7″N 12°32′52.4″E
- System: Copenhagen Metro Station
- Owner: Metroselskabet
- Line: City Circle Line (M3)
- Platforms: 1 island platform
- Tracks: 2
- Bus routes: 6A

Construction
- Structure type: Underground
- Accessible: Yes

Other information
- Station code: Skp
- Fare zone: 2
- Website: Copenhagen Metro - Skjolds Plads

History
- Opened: 29 September 2019; 7 years ago
- Former names: Rådmandsmarken
Location
- Location within Copenhagen Location within Greater Copenhagen Location within Denmark

Skjolds Plads station is an underground Copenhagen Metro station at Skjolds Plads in the Outer Nørrebro district of Copenhagen, Denmark. It is on the City Circle Line (M3), between Vibenshus Runddel and Nørrebro. The station is situated at the intersection of Tagensvej and Haraldsgade, and is in Zone 2.

== History ==
The station opened on 29 September 2019 together with 16 other stations of the line.

== Design ==
The station is located under Skjolds Plads, but the main staircase is located in the central reservation of Haraldsgade, facing Tagensvej. A secondary staircase is located at Skjolds Plads, Fafnersgade. The escalator shaft is clad with structured glass panels is a grey colour which is a reference to the University of Copenhagen's nearby North Campus.

== Service ==
Preceding station	Copenhagen Metro	Following station
Vibenshus Runddel clockwise	M3	Nørrebro counter-clockwise
