= Trianglen, Copenhagen =

Square in Copenhagen, Denmark

Coordinates: 55°41′57″N 12°34′38″E

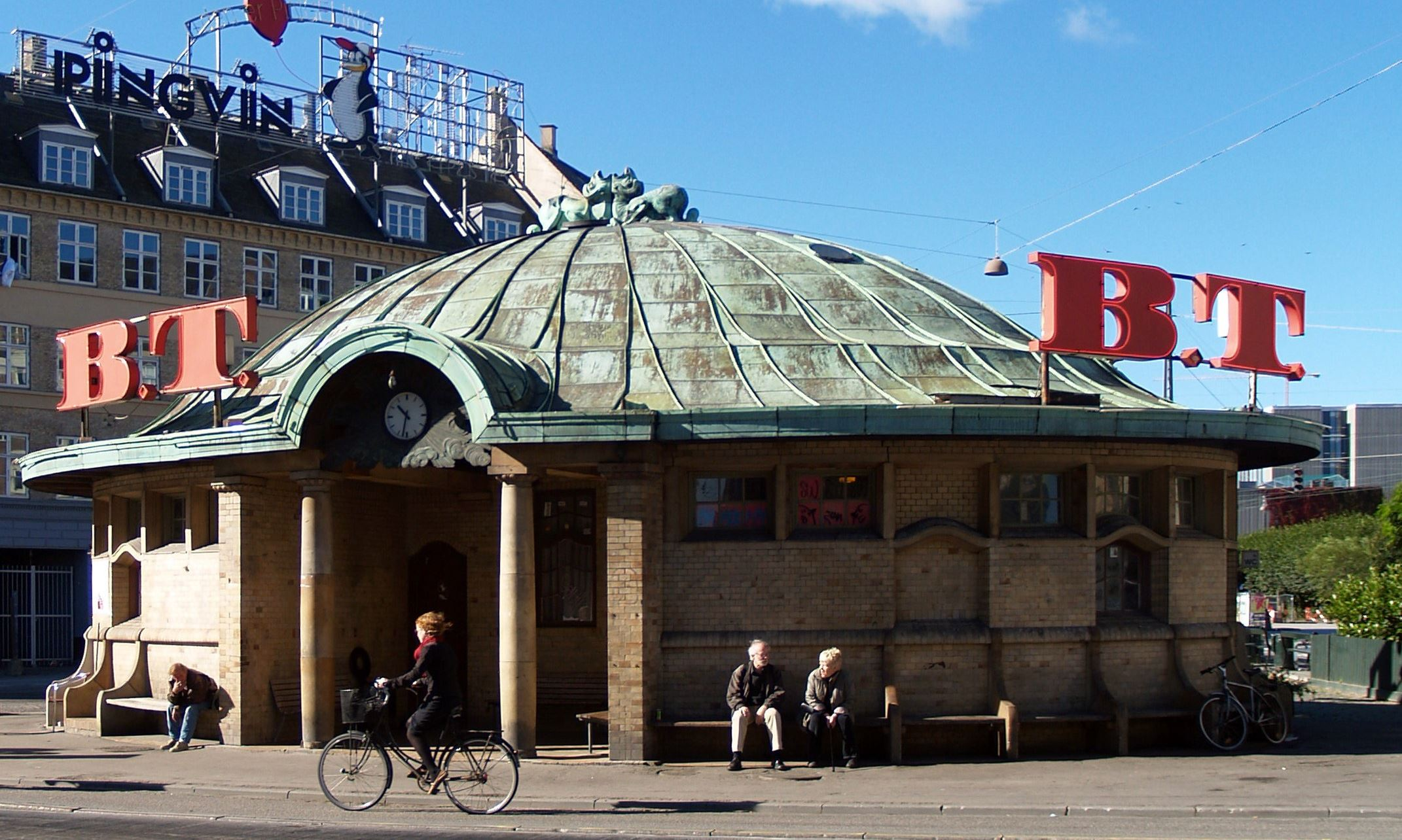
"The Bee" on Trianglen

Trianglen (lit. 'The Triangle') is a central junction and public space in the Østerbro district of Copenhagen, Denmark. Five streets meet in the junction: Blegdamsvej, Øster Allé, Østerbrogade, Nordre Frihavnsgade and Odensegade. Trianglen is a station on the City Circle Line of the Copenhagen Metro.

Lille Trianglen (lit. 'Little Triangle') is located some 400 metres to the south, along Østerbrogade. It is the junction of Østerbrogade, Dag Hammarskjölds Allé, Classensgade, Øster Farimagsgade and Øster Søgade.

== History ==
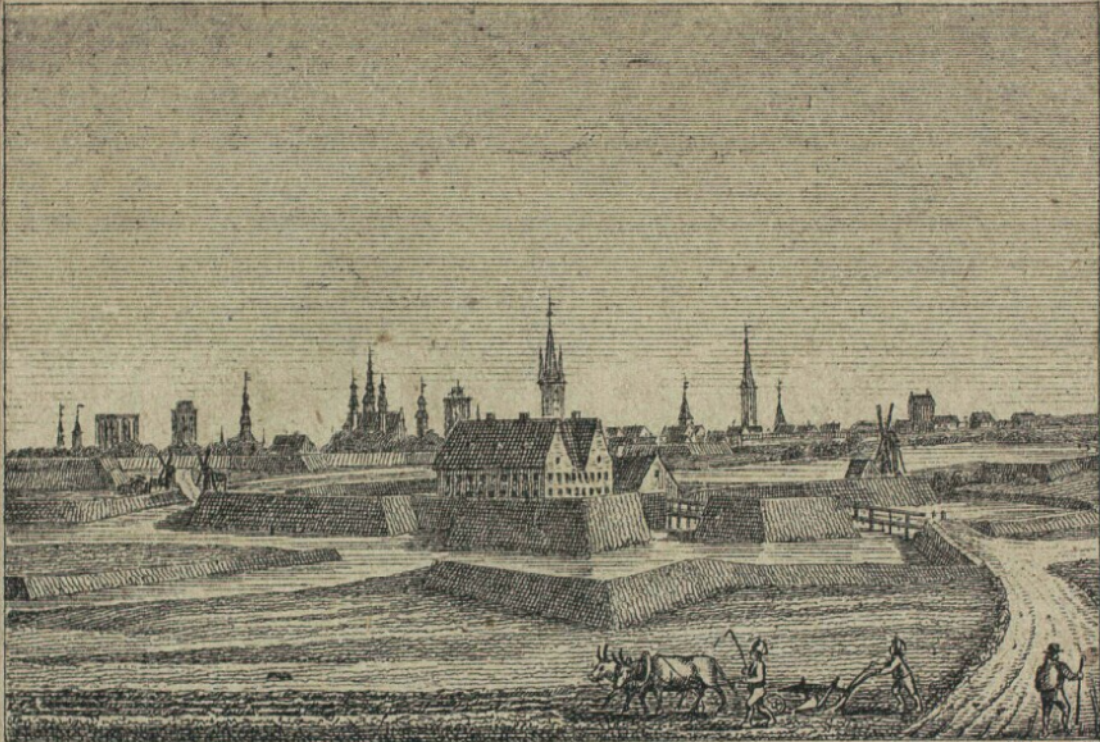
Vartorv in 1646

The hospital Vartov was from 1630 located at the site. Its fortified building was part of Christian IV's defense of Copenhagen. The East Road passed through the complex which consisted of four wings surrounded by ramparts and moats. The building was destroyed during the Swedish siege of Copenhagen in 1658 and Vartov subsequently moved to its current home on Vester Voldgade in 1665.

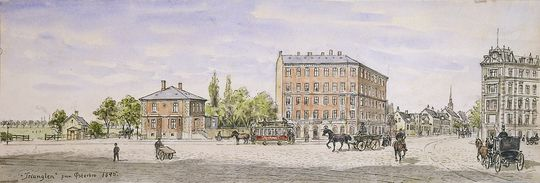
Trianglen in 1895

The site's importance as a junction outside the Eastern City Gate was consolidated when Øster Allé and Blegdamsvej was expanded in 1750.

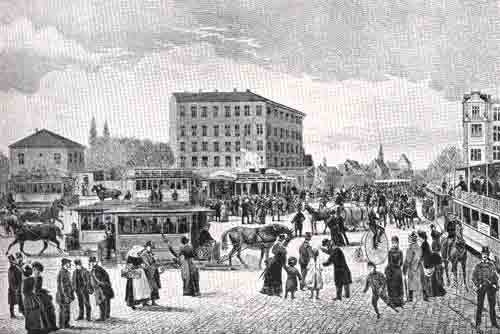
Trianglen in 1884

In the 19th century, Trianglen was a hub for carriages which drove copenhageners north to Jægersborg Dyrehave. Strandvejen Steam Tramway Company opened a route between Trianglen and Klampenborg in 1884 but it was discontinued in 1892.

== Notable buildings ==
Two buildings bear testament to Trianglen's history as a hub for trams. The building in the middle of the square is a former waiting room built for the tramways in 1907. It was designed by Peder Vilhelm Jensen-Klint and has variously been referred to as "The Bee", "The Turtle and "The soup bowl"" due to its shape. It was listed in 1986. The building at 132 Blegdamsvej is a former tram depot, Blegdamsvej Remisse (Blegdamsvej Depot), built by Copenhagen Tramways in connection with the electrification of the tramways in 1901 to a design by Vilhelm Friederichsen. It was decommissioned in 1964 in connection with the discontinuation of Line 15 and materiel was transferred to Svanemøllen Depot. The building was converted into a community centre and sports venue in the 1980s.

The Triangel Teatret Building (Østerbrogade 70) is a former cinema from 1929. The design company Normann Copenhagen has opened a flagship store at Østerbrogade 70, overlooking the junction. It was listed as one of !"12 Treasures of Europe" by The New York Times in 2014.

== Gallery ==
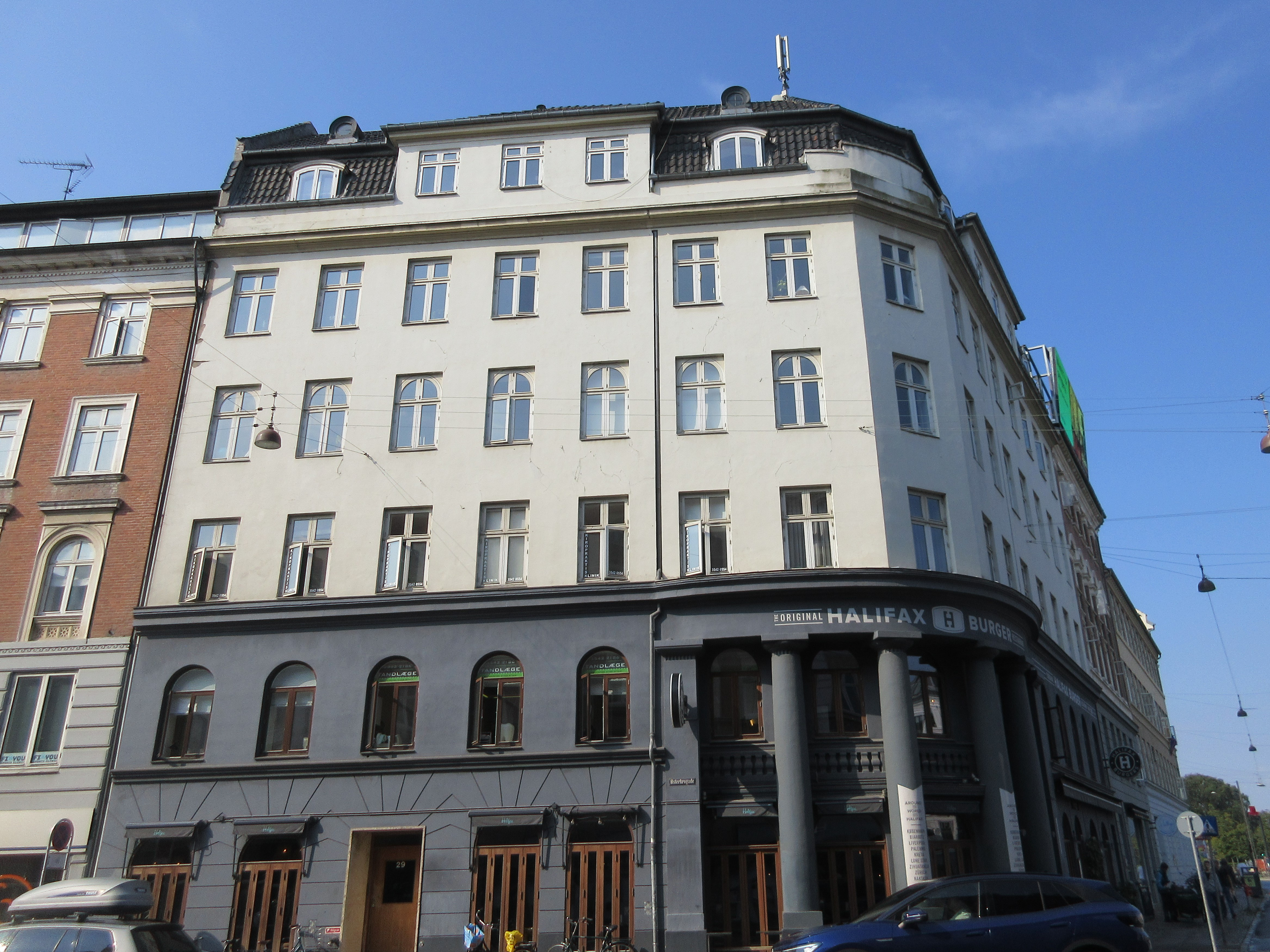
Trianglen 1

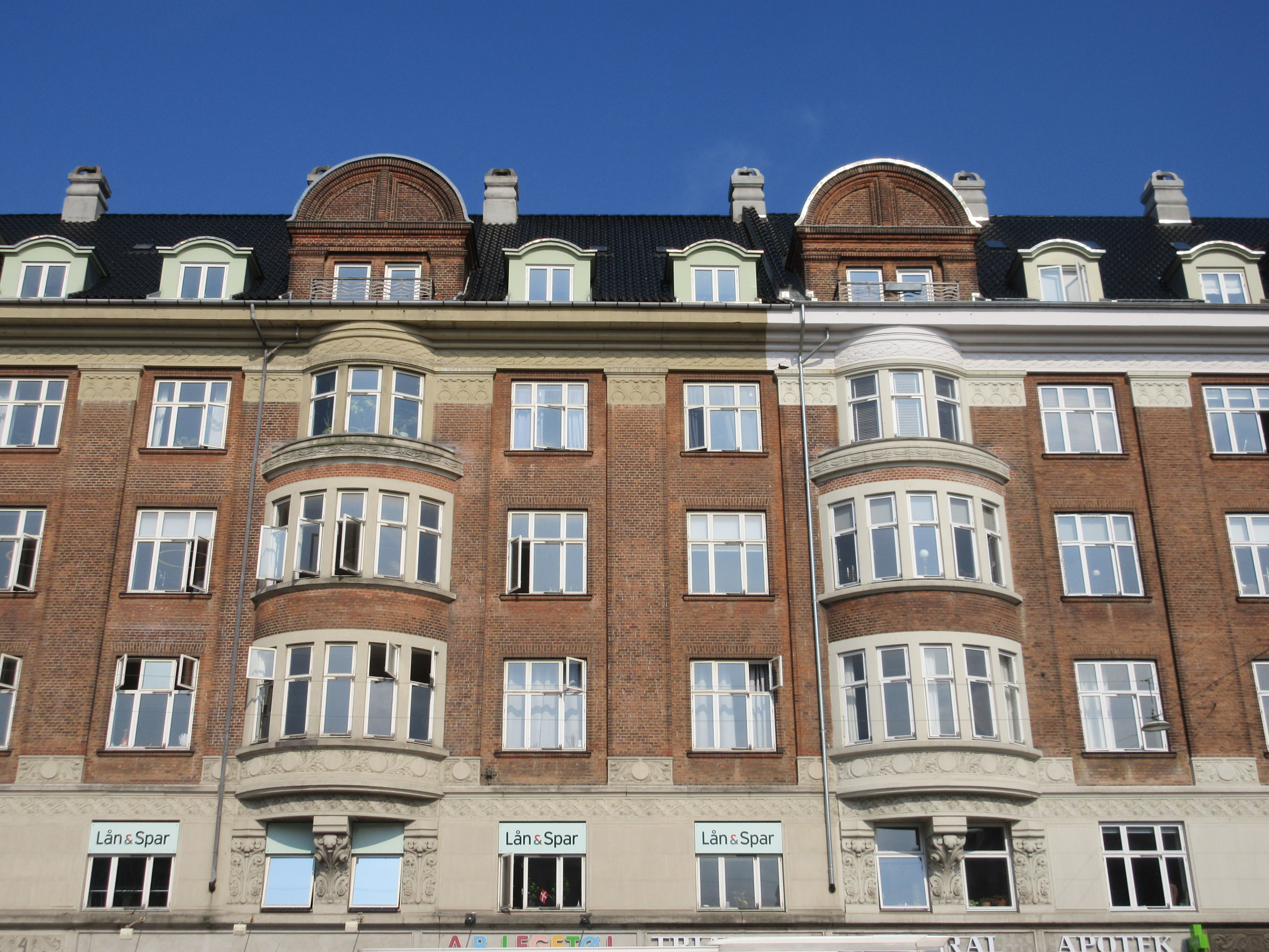
Trianglen 2–4

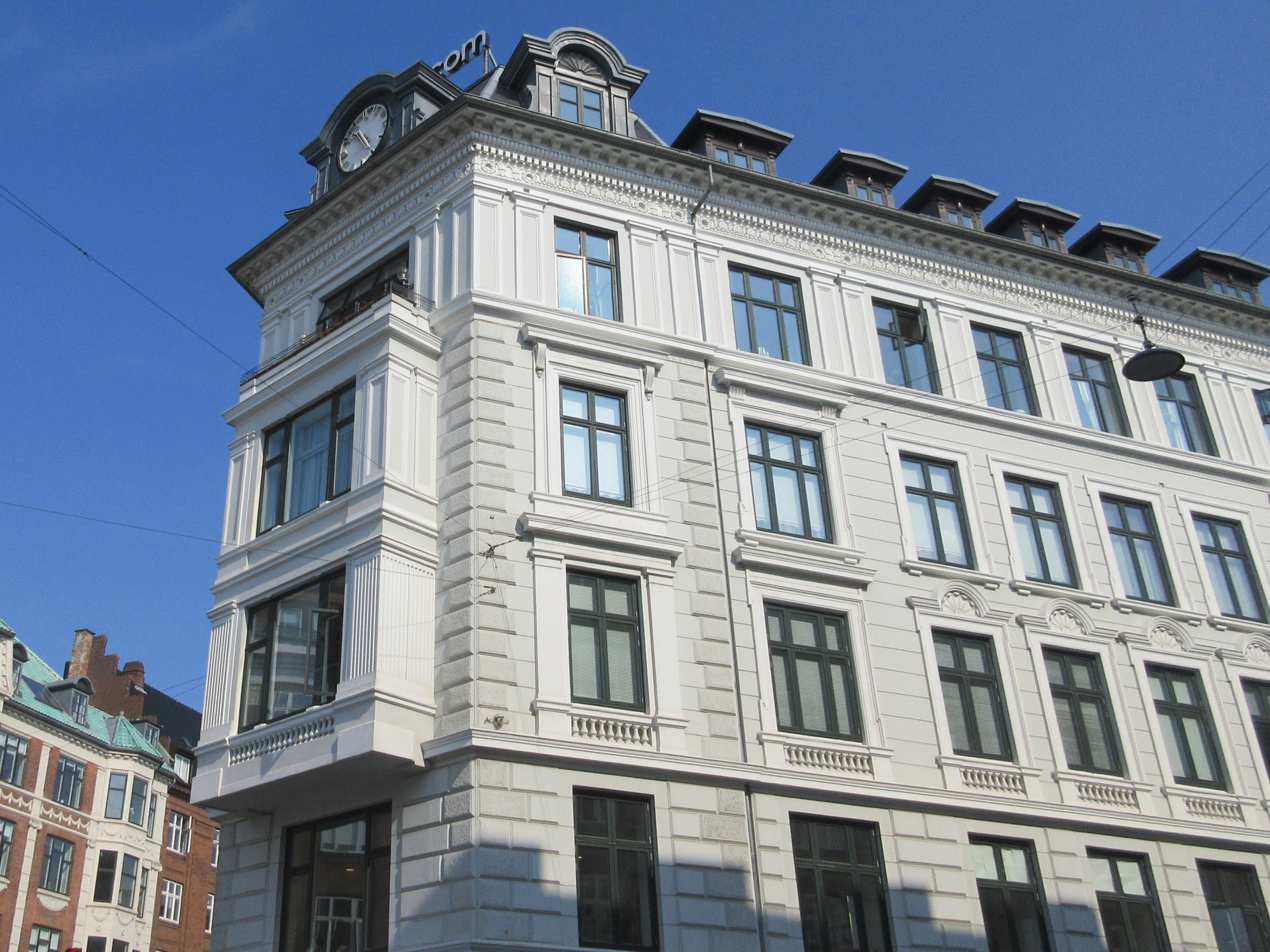
Østerbrogade 78

== See also ==
- Frederiksberg Runddel
