= Fælledparken =

Park in Copenhagen, Denmark

Coordinates: 55°41′59″N 12°34′12″E

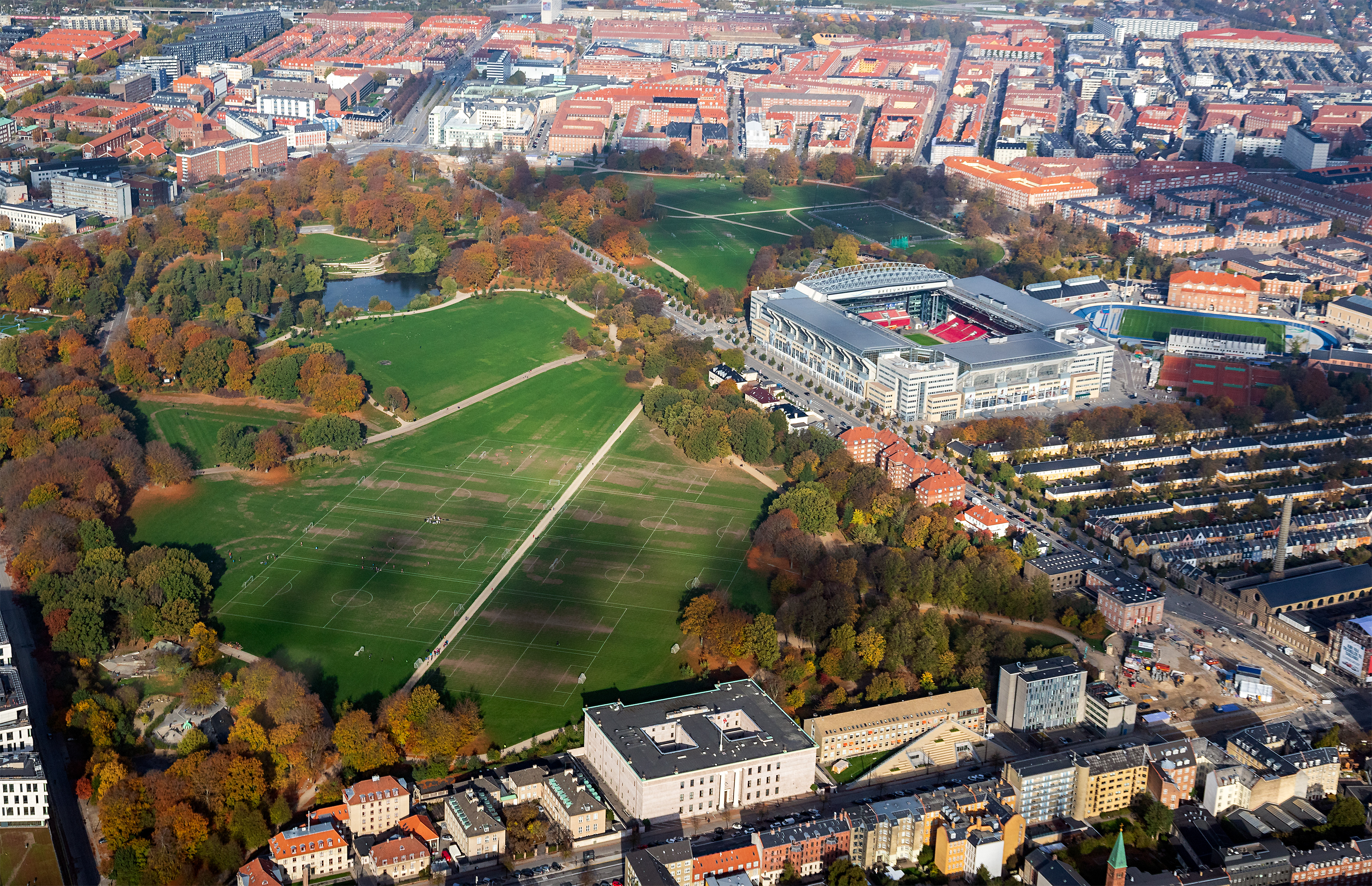
Fælledparken with Parken Stadium in the upper right corner

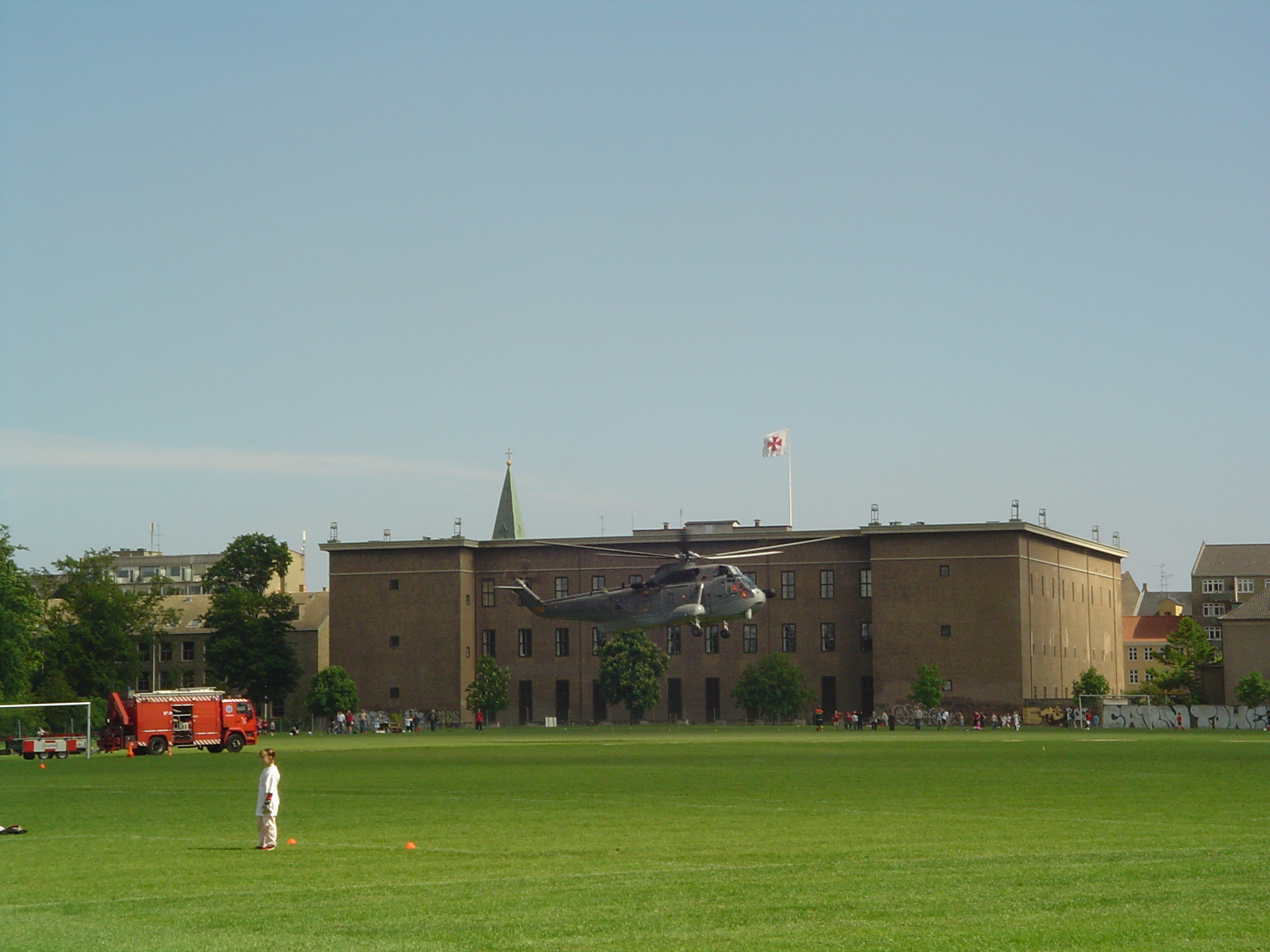
Rescue helicopter from the Danish Air Force transports patient to Rigshospitalet. The big building is the headquarters of the Danish Order of Freemasons.

The park Fælledparken in Copenhagen, Denmark, was created 1906–1914 by landscape architect Edvard Glæsel in cooperation with the Copenhagen Municipality on the commons (Danish: fælled) previously named Nørrefælled and Østerfælled. Fælledparken is located in the eastern part of Copenhagen called Østerbro.

Fælledparken is used for activities such as:

- Walking
- Sunbathing
- Running
- Playgrounds
- Soccer training and matches on the courts marked on the grass
- The cafe Pavillonen
- Copenhagen Historic Grand Prix (auto racing with old cars)
- 1 May: Labour Day demonstration, with speeches by politicians
- Concerts and celebrations such as carnival

Fælledparken lies adjacent to Parken, the Danish national stadium.

The southern part of Fælledparken was sometimes used by rescue helicopters from the Danish Air Force when transporting patients to Rigshospitalet. This practice was abandoned in the year 2006 with the construction of a helicopter platform on the roof of Rigshospitalet.

A path runs along the southern edge of Fælledparken' past the Niels Bohr Institute where Niels Bohr, Werner Heisenberg, Erwin Schrödinger and other famous physicists of the 20th century would walk and discuss their theories on space and quantum physics. These strolls in Fælledparken were essential in their thought process and theorising so soon acquired the name Filosofgangen, one of many with the same name where great thinkers gathered their thoughts.

== Skateboarding and street sports ==
In 2009, and older skatepark from 1988 in the southeast of Fælledparken was rebuilt as Fælledparken Skatepark. The skatepark opened in 2011, and is designed for all levels of skateboarders (beginners, advanced, and professional), and includes bowls, verts, ramps and street skating facilities. Apart from skateboarding, the park is also open for BMX and rollerskating. The skatepark is unique in its diversity design and is also one of the largest in Northern Europe at 4,500 m2 of skateboarding facilities.

It is prohibited to use Fælledparken Skatepark for scooting, but a smaller park (Løbehjulsparken) has been built specifically for freestyle scooting near the southwest corner of Fælledparken.

== Football ==
Boldklubben Heimdal football club, founded in 1919, play their home matches in Fælledparken.
