= M3 (Copenhagen Metro) =

Copenhagen Metro line

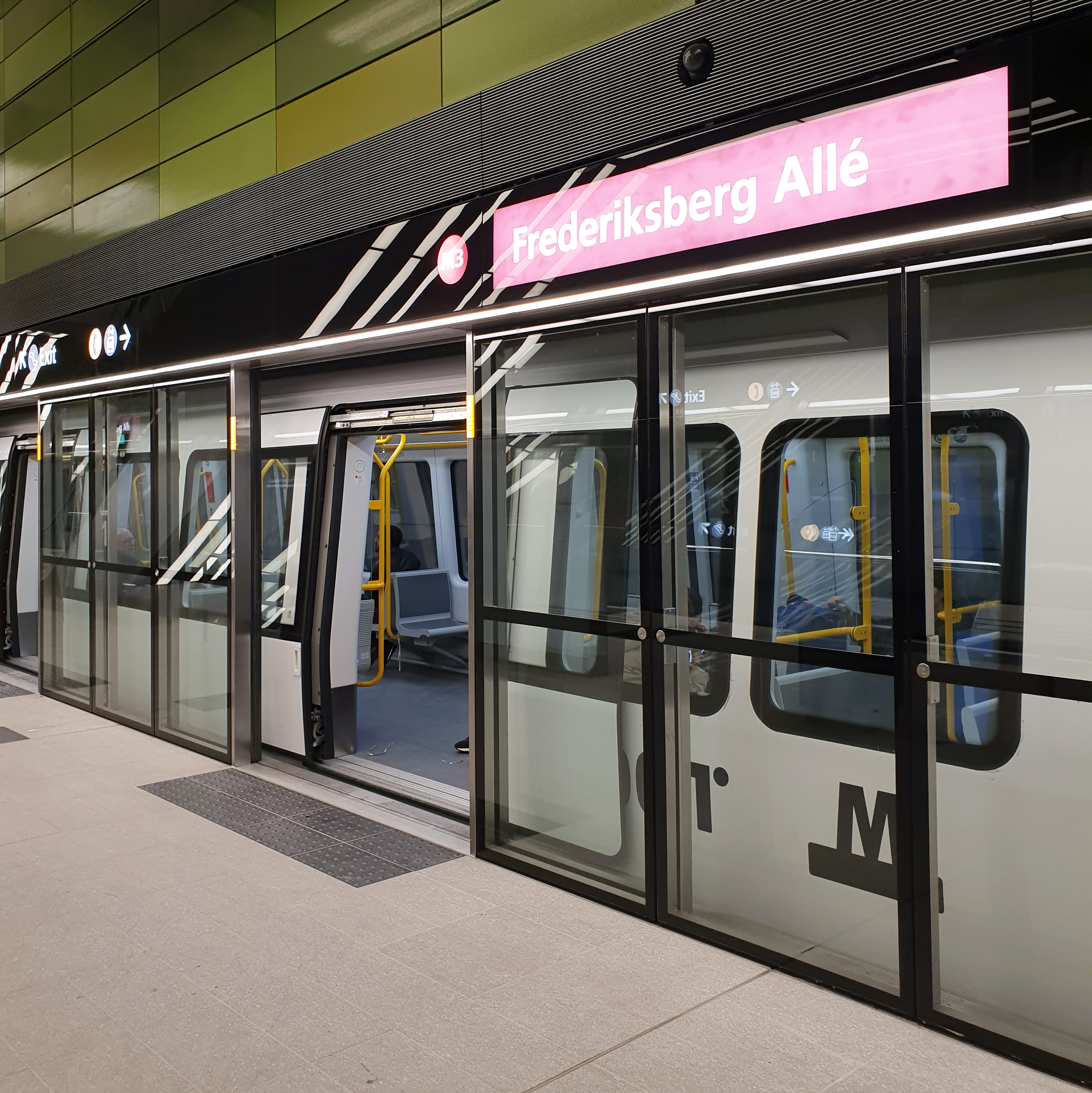
- M3 train at Frederiksberg Allé station

Overview
- Owner: Metroselskabet
- Locale: Copenhagen, Denmark
- Stations: 17

Service
- Type: Rapid transit
- System: Copenhagen Metro
- Operator: Metro Service

History
- Opened: 29 September 2019; 6 years ago

Technical
- Line length: 15.5 km (9.6 mi)
- Number of tracks: Double
- Character: Underground
- Track gauge: 1,435 mm (4 ft 8 1/2 in) standard gauge
- Electrification: 750 V DC third rail
- Operating speed: 90 km/h (56 mph)
Route map

The M3 line or City Circle Line is a loop line of the Copenhagen Metro. It has been claimed by COWI that the line is the largest construction project to have taken place in Copenhagen during the last 400 years. The network's total length is 15.5 kilometres (9.6 mi) and has 17 stations. The line opened on 29 September 2019.

Plans for its construction were approved by the Danish Parliament on 1 June 2007. Preferred bidders were announced during November 2010. The total cost was estimated at 15 billion kroner but had risen to 21.3 billion kroner ($3.39 billion) when the contractors were announced in late 2010. It is a fully automated line, using driverless trains and capable of routine 24/7 operations. Italian rolling stock manufacturer AnsaldoBreda provides the trains for the new line, and the stations are intentionally similar to the Copenhagen Metro's existing stations. The transit agency Movia has projected that up to 34 million passengers eventually switch from buses to using the Metro during each year.

== History ==
=== Background ===
During 2002, the Copenhagen Metro, a fully automated driverless metro system, was opened. It quickly became known for its high level of reliability, attaining an operational punctuality in excess of 98 per cent of on-time arrivals. Due to its success, during 2005, plans were put forward for further expansion of Copenhagen Metro in the form of the City Circle Line. As proposed, it involved the construction of a 15.5 kilometres (9.6 mi) underground circular route, a total of 17 stations, and emergency escape shafts, to support two new underground lines, designated as M3 and M4. The planned City Circle Line would connect into the Kongens Nytorv and Frederiksberg stations of the preexisting metro network.

During the summer of 2007, the Danish Parliament gave its approval for the construction of the proposed line, although it would be another four years before construction activity would commence. At the time of its approval, the project had a projected cost of DKK21.3 billion ($3.2 billion) along with an anticipated date of completion by July 2019. Transport group Metroselskabet held overall responsibility for the City Circle Line.

=== Contracting ===
On 7 January 2011, the civil engineering contract for the City Circle Line was awarded to the Copenhagen Metro Team (CMT), a joint venture of Salini Impregilo, Technimont and SELI. Italian rail equipment specialist Hitachi Rail STS was selected to supply the trains, electrical infrastructure and communications systems, SCADA, platform-edge doors, and the signalling system.

The route's tunnels were constructed by Seli Tunneling Denmark ApS, subsidiary of Seli SPA, and subsequently acquired by Salini Impregilo. Consultancy services regarding rolling stock and the automated train depot were sourced from Ramboll and WS Atkins. The line incorporates various live data feeds for the purpose of highlighting hazards and recording any accidents using project compliance software ComplyPro, produced by software company Comply Serve.

=== Construction ===
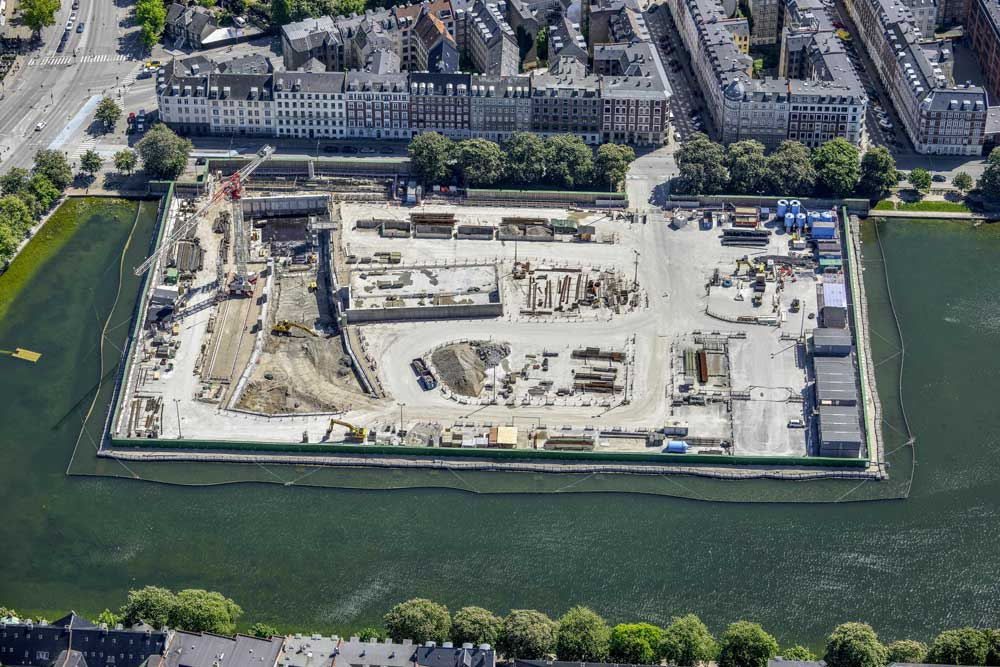
Øster Søgade construction site in 2014 (future sub-surface interchange between lines M3 and M4)

During 2013, boring of a pair of 15.5 km (9.6 mi) parallel tunnels commenced using a total of four tunnel boring machines named Eva, Minerva, Nora, and Tria. These tunnels were bored with an inner diameter of 4.9 metres (16 ft 1 in) and at a depth varying between 20 and 35 metres (65 ft 7 in and 114 ft 10 in). The tunnels have been built by Seli Tunneling Denmark, that also manufactured two out of four machines in Denmark, at a facility especially prepared for the task. The interior walls of the tunnel have been coated with concrete and multiple emergency shafts have been installed for the purpose of providing ventilation and maintenance access. The extracted earth produced by the construction effort was routinely used to fill the Nordhavn reclamation project in Øresund.

During the construction process, it was commonplace for geological sensors to be deployed in the general vicinity to monitor ground movements for the purpose of protecting buildings and other structures in the city. During 2014, the line's control and maintenance centre buildings were completed (at Vasbygade, 55°39′30″N 12°32′57″E). That same year, various other works were finished, including the walls around all of the stations, and three of the shaft structures. Reportedly, the final construction activity was centered upon the refurbishment of the surrounding areas around the new stations.

== Stations and route ==
=== Overview ===
Diagram of Copenhagen Metro opening of the northern part of the M4 (2020)

The 15.5 km (9.6 mi) City Circle Line serves 17 stations. It crosses the M1 and M2 lines at Kongens Nytorv and Frederiksberg stations, and suburban train services at København H, Østerport and Nørrebro. It extend the Metro network to the Nørrebro and Østerbro areas and København H (the Copenhagen central station). The City Circle Line services to many of the major areas of Copenhagen, including the Danish Parliament, the Central Station, City Hall, and multiple stations of the S-train and existing metro stops. Access to the region and commuter heavy rail network is also deliberately provision for at several places along its route; furthermore, a twin-track line provides a connection between the City Circle Line and the Nordhavnen Metro. Just as M1 and M2 share a section of the existing metro, the City Circle Line shares a 6-station section with the M4 line.

Initially, two possible routes were considered, after an even bigger screening of ideas. In December 2005, it was announced that the Copenhagen and Frederiksberg municipalities had selected the Frederiksberg route; the purpose is to cover areas not yet served by S-trains or the Metro.

The finished City Circle Line has been promoted as playing a heavy influence upon much of Copenhagen's current transport network. The transit agency Movia projects up to 34 million passengers switch from buses to the Metro annually. Once the line is completed, 85 per cent of all homes, work places and educational facilities in Copenhagen's inner city area, as well as the surrounding neighbourhoods, shall be less than a ten-minute walk from either a metro or train station. It has been projected for the line is used by approximately 240,000 passengers per day. It is fully automated, being operated using a driverless system that provides 24/7 service coverage and at a peak frequency between trains of 100 seconds. It is intended for trains on the line to achieve an average speed of 40km/h during regular service. As such, performing a round journey on the line is estimated takes approximately 28 minutes.

== Stations ==
The stations of the City Circle Line are all underground, with easy access from the street level to the platform. The structure of the stations is largely identical to that of the existing Copenhagen Metro stations. They are built at a depth of approximately 19 meters using cut-and-cover methods; a standardised box structure has been adopted, measuring 64 meters by 20 meters. Each one is outfitted with island platforms of between 7 meters and 9 meters.

Stations are listed counterclockwise, beginning in the southeast.

- København H (Copenhagen Central Station, interchange with S-trains, DSB and SJ)
- Rådhuspladsen (City Hall Square)
- Gammel Strand near Christiansborg Palace
- Kongens Nytorv (interchange with M1 and M2)
- Marmorkirken (The Marble Church)
- Østerport (interchange with S-trains and DSB)
- Trianglen (close to the Parken Stadium)
- Poul Henningsens Plads
- Vibenshus Runddel
- Skjolds Plads
- Nørrebro (interchange with S-trains)
- Nørrebros Runddel
- Nuuks Plads
- Aksel Møllers Have
- Frederiksberg (interchange with M1 and M2)
- Frederiksberg Allé
- Enghave Plads

While the stations have a similar structure to those of the current Metro, they have been designed with more varied materials and colors, making each individual station more recognisable.

== Rolling stock ==
Italian rolling stock manufacturer AnsaldoBreda, which had previously provided trains for the existing Copenhagen metro, was selected to supply new-build rolling stock for the line. Deliveries of the trains to the Metro company commenced during 2014; these are being referred to as being the version 5 of the AnsaldoBreda Driverless Metro trains. While these vehicles are broadly identical to the ones running on the Copenhagen metro, they feature several advancements in technology, materials and design.

The driverless trains are directly monitored from the line's centralised operations and maintenance centre; they are equipped with a communications-based train control (CBTC) for this purpose. These vehicles are to reportedly capable of a top speed of 90 km/h, an increase over the 80 km/h maximum for trains used on other Metro lines. They have a maximum capacity of 314 passengers and there is a train every 100 seconds, giving a frequency of 36 trains per hour. The system runs 24 hours per day, and passengers are able to keep track of the train location through an electronic display system.
