= Østerbro =

District of Copenhagen, Denmark

- Districts of Copenhagen
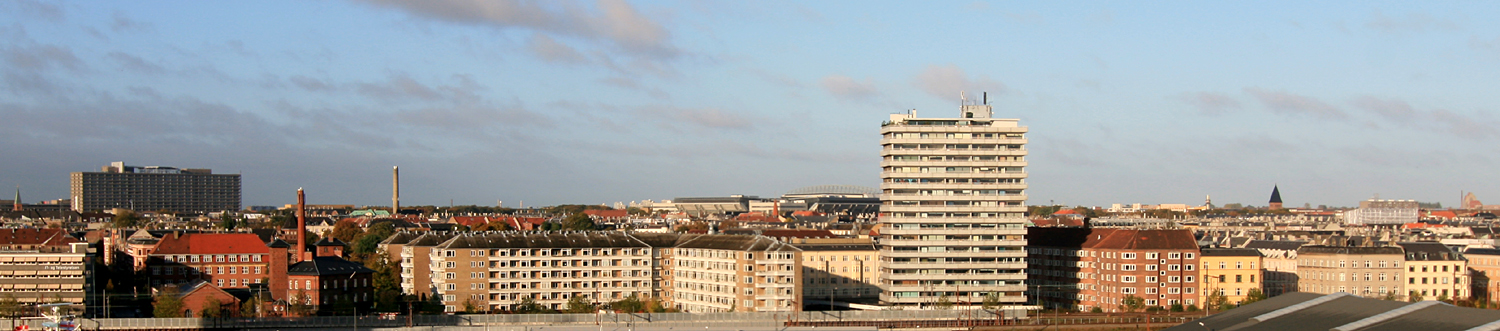
- Østerbro København
- Etymology: Paved road outside eastern gate
- Interactive map of Østerbro
- Coordinates: 55.711°N 12.578°E

Area
  - Total: 8.74 km^{2} (3.37 sq mi)

Population (January 1, 2016)
  - Total: 76,402
  - Density: 8,740/km^{2} (22,600/sq mi)
- Postal code: 2100 København Ø

Østerbro (Danish pronunciation: [ˈøstɐˌpʁoˀ]) is one of the 10 official districts of Copenhagen Municipality, Denmark. It is located just northeast of the city centre, outside the old city gate Østerport which, after it was moved around 1700, used to be located close to present-day Østerport Station. From the beginning, Østerbro has been a wealthy district, and it remains one of the most affluent areas in Copenhagen.

== Geography ==
Østerbro has an area of 11.84 km^{2} (4.57 sq mi) and a population of 68,769. It is bordered by Nørrebro to the west, Hellerup to the north and Øresund to the east.

== Landmarks ==
- Danish Meteorological Institute
- Den Frie Udstilling
- Gasværket
- Frihavn
- Fælledparken
- Garrison's Cemetery
- Parken, the National Stadium
- Rigshospitalet
- Trianglen (“The Triangle”)
- Østerport Station
- Kastellet
- Nordre Frihavnsgade
- The Little Mermaid
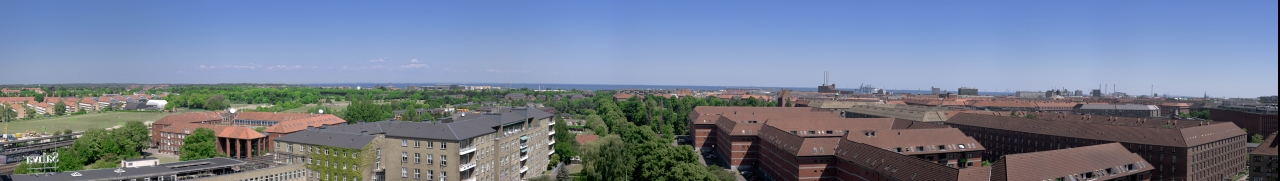

== See also ==
- Districts of Copenhagen
