= Sankt Petri Passage =

Coordinates: 55.6805°N 12.5702°E

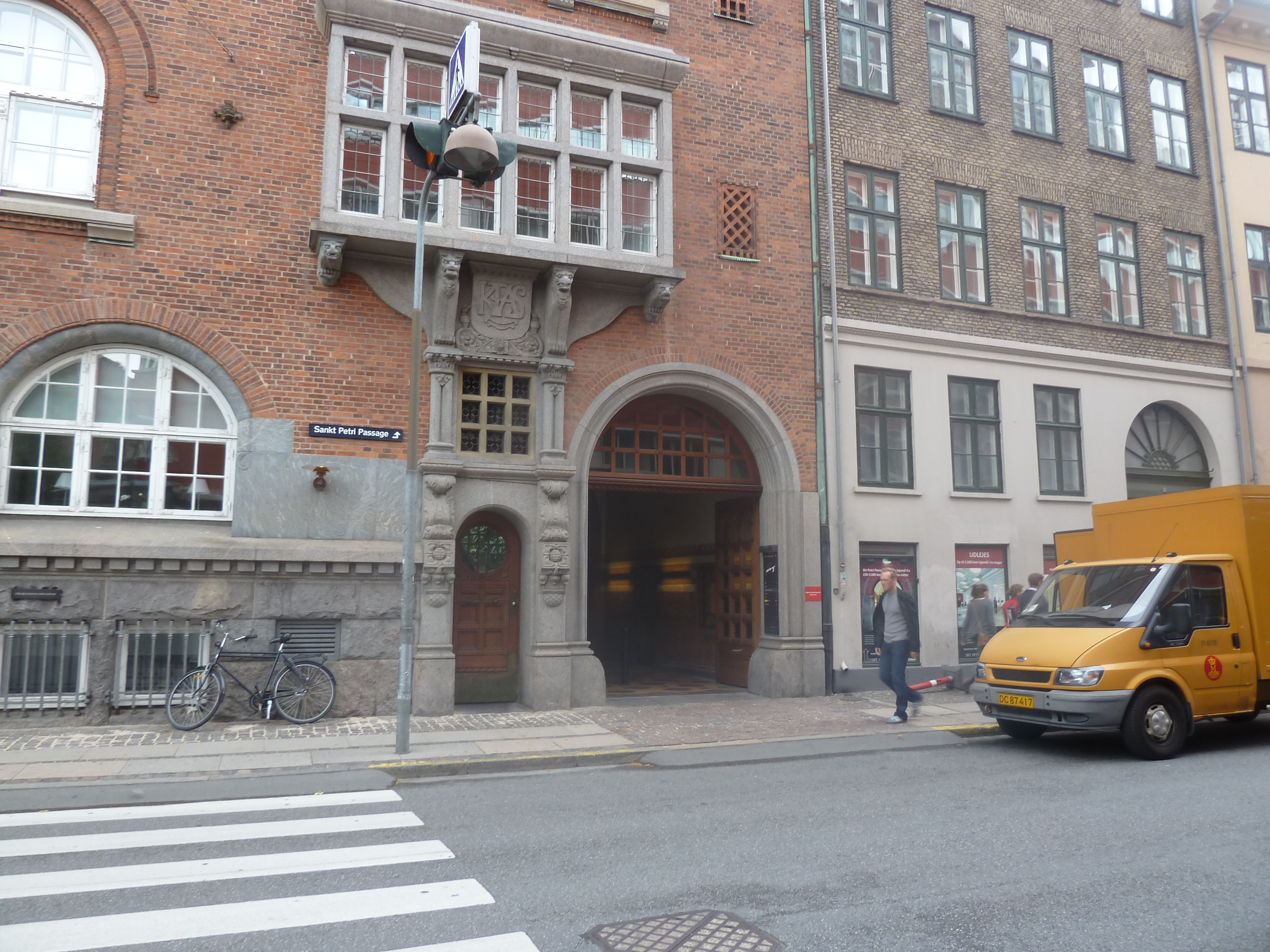
The gateway on Nørregade

Sankt Petri Passage (lit. 'St Peter's Passageway') is a passageway and surrounding mixed-use complex linking Nørregade with Larslejsstræde in central Copenhagen, Denmark. The National Romantic complex was built for the telephone company KTAS (now TDC) in the 1900s and is also known as Telefonhuset ("The Telephone House"). The new name refers to neighbouring St Petri's Church. Current tenants include KVUC as well as several Danish and international companies.

== History ==
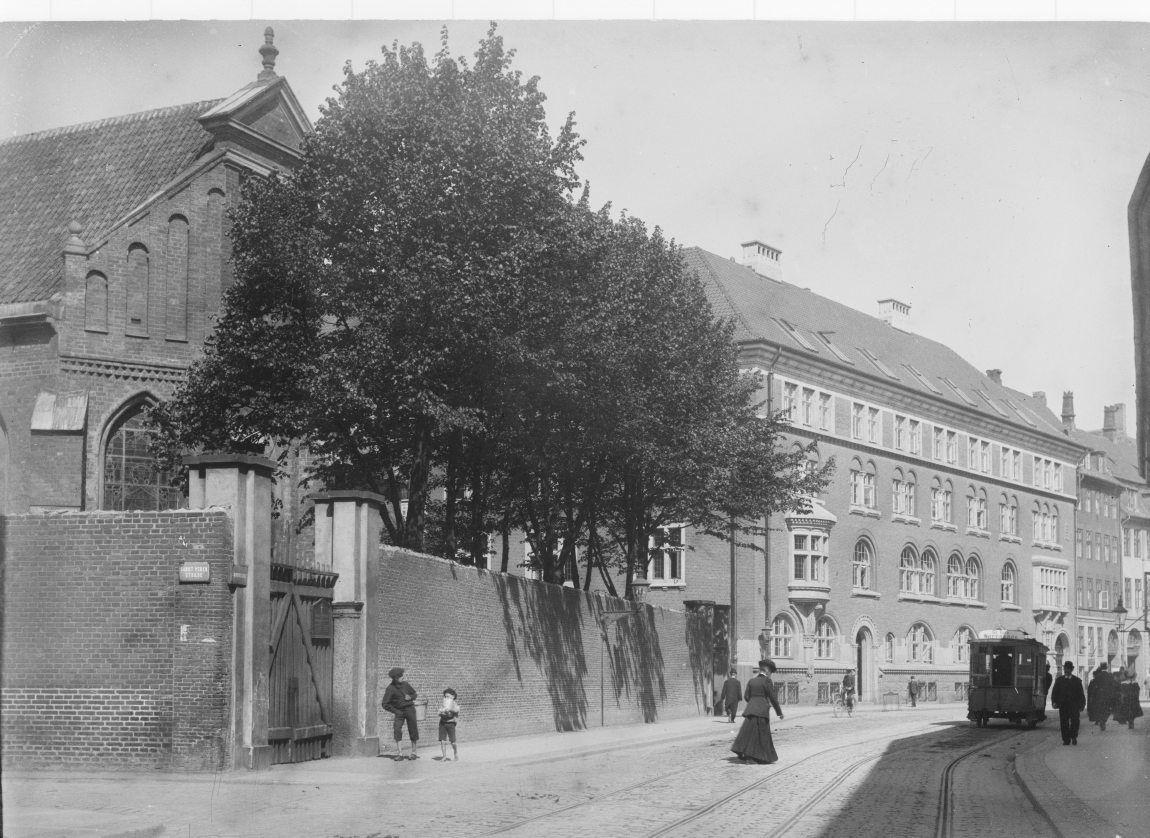
The Telephone House photographed shortly after its completion by Fritz Theodor Benzen

KTAS was first based in the Jorcks Passage complex. In 1899, the company acquired the site in Nørregade. The architect Fritz Koch was selected for the task of designing a new headquarters. Construction began in 1900 but progressed slowly due to financial difficulties. In 1909. Jens Ingwersen took over the project following Koch's death in 1906 and the complex was finally inaugurated in 1909. It was later expanded between 1917 and 1938, both with the incorporation of the existing properties at Nørregade 27 and 29 and with new buildings designed by Ingwersen on Larslejsstræde (No. 4–6) and Nørre Voldgade (No. 38) on the other side of the block. The complex contained both company headquarters, workshops and telephone main central.

KTAS Pensionskasse (KRAS pension fund), the owner of the office complex, sold it to Carlyle Group in 2007 in anticipation of TDC's move to a new headquarters at Teglholmen in 2009. The building complex was subsequently put through a comprehensive refurbishment undertaken by Revco Property Development and renamed Sankt Petri Passage with a reference to neighbouring St Petri's Church. Sankt Petri Passage was sold to Industriens Pension in January 2015.

== Architecture ==
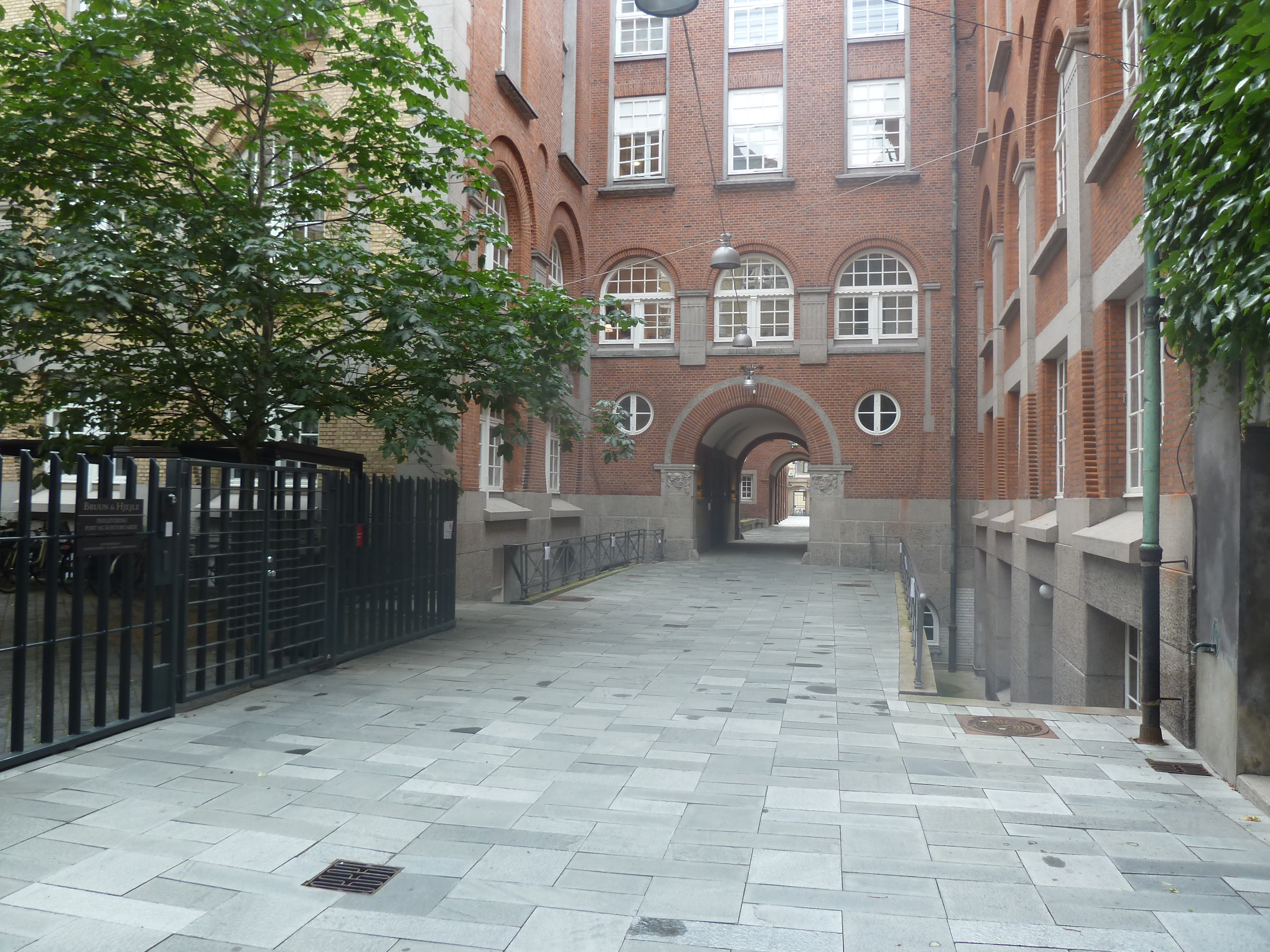
One of the courtyards

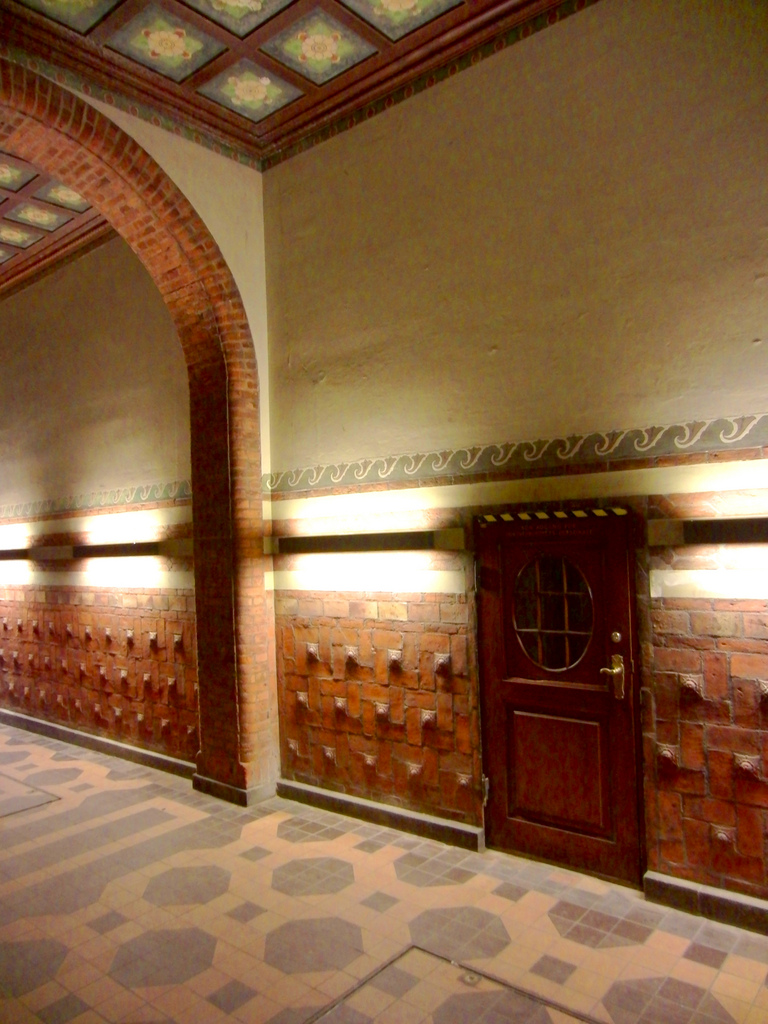
One of the courtyards

The office complex comprises 14 buildings with a total floor area of approximately 45,000 square metres. It is built in red brick on a high granite plinth in a National Romantic style with many decorative details. The inner courtyard features some 40 portrait reliefs.

Nørregade 27 and 29 are both listed. No. 27 is a five bay building from 1839. The seven bay building at No. 29 is from approximately 1810.

One of building's paired bas-reliefs, here one woman speaks, another appears to listen.

Carvings flanking passage, one woman holds torch, the other peers toward her from across the passage.

Among the building’s many carvings are paired figural bas-reliefs set into the piers at either end of the arched passageway. One pair depicts two women, one listens, with hand cupped to her ear, the other with lips parted as if in conversation. At the end, a second pair shows one woman holding a torch while the other, shading her eyes with her hand, looks toward her.

== Outdoor spaces ==
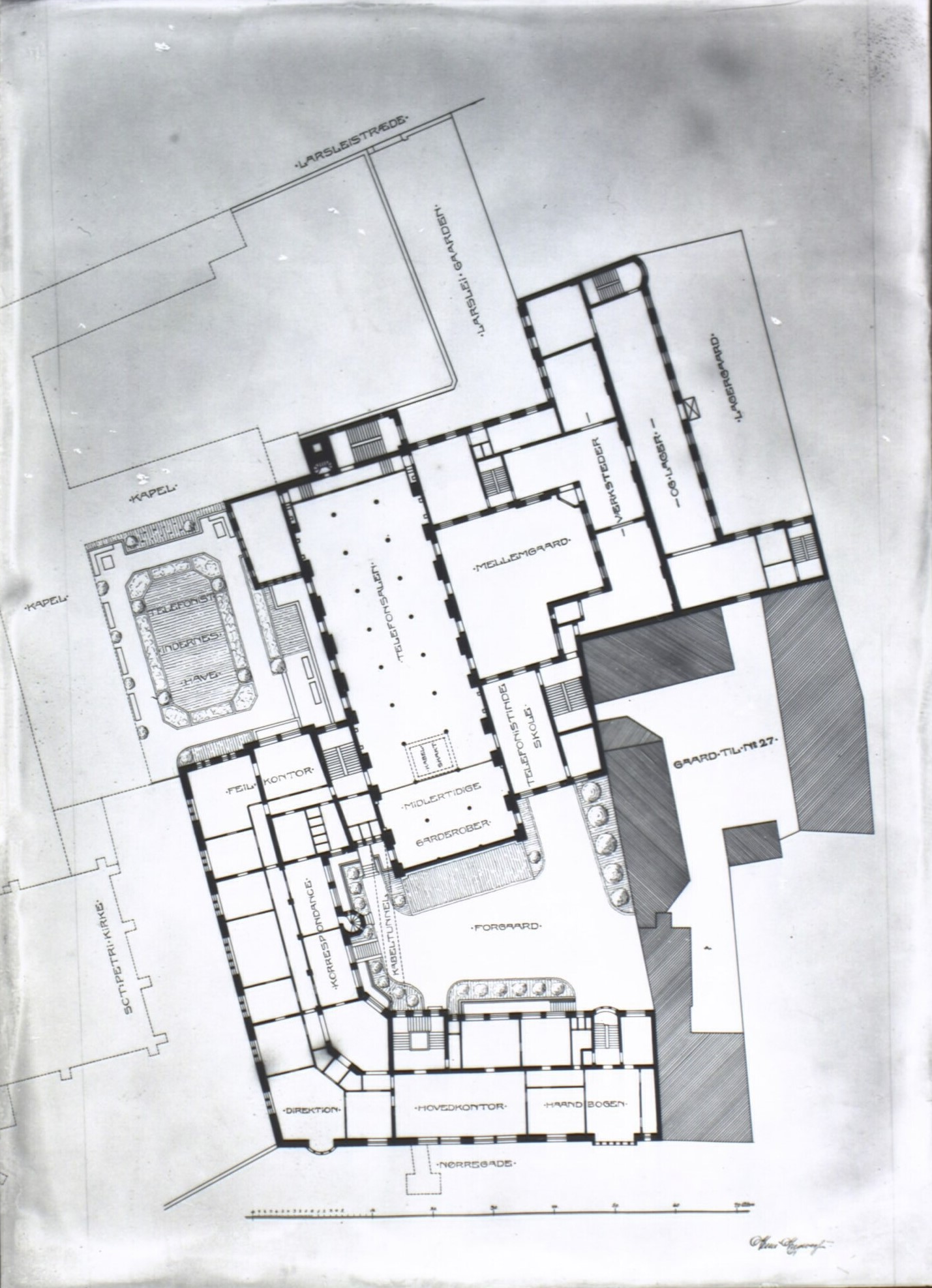
Plan of the complex.

A series of interior courtyards creates a passageway linking Nørregade with Larslejsstræde. The complex also includes a small greenspace, Telefonistindehaven ("The Operator Girls' Garden"), which was renovated by Niels Junggreen Have in 1996.

== Tenants ==
The educational institution Københavns VUC has one of its two campuses in the complex while the other one is located in Københavns Belysningsvæsen's former headquarters on Gothersgade. Other tenants include Google Denmark, Redbull Denmark, Karnov, the law firm Bruun & Hjejle and the advertising agency Mensch.

== See also ==
- Sankt Annæ Passage
