= Nørregade 27, Copenhagen =

Listed building in Copenhagen

Nørregade 27
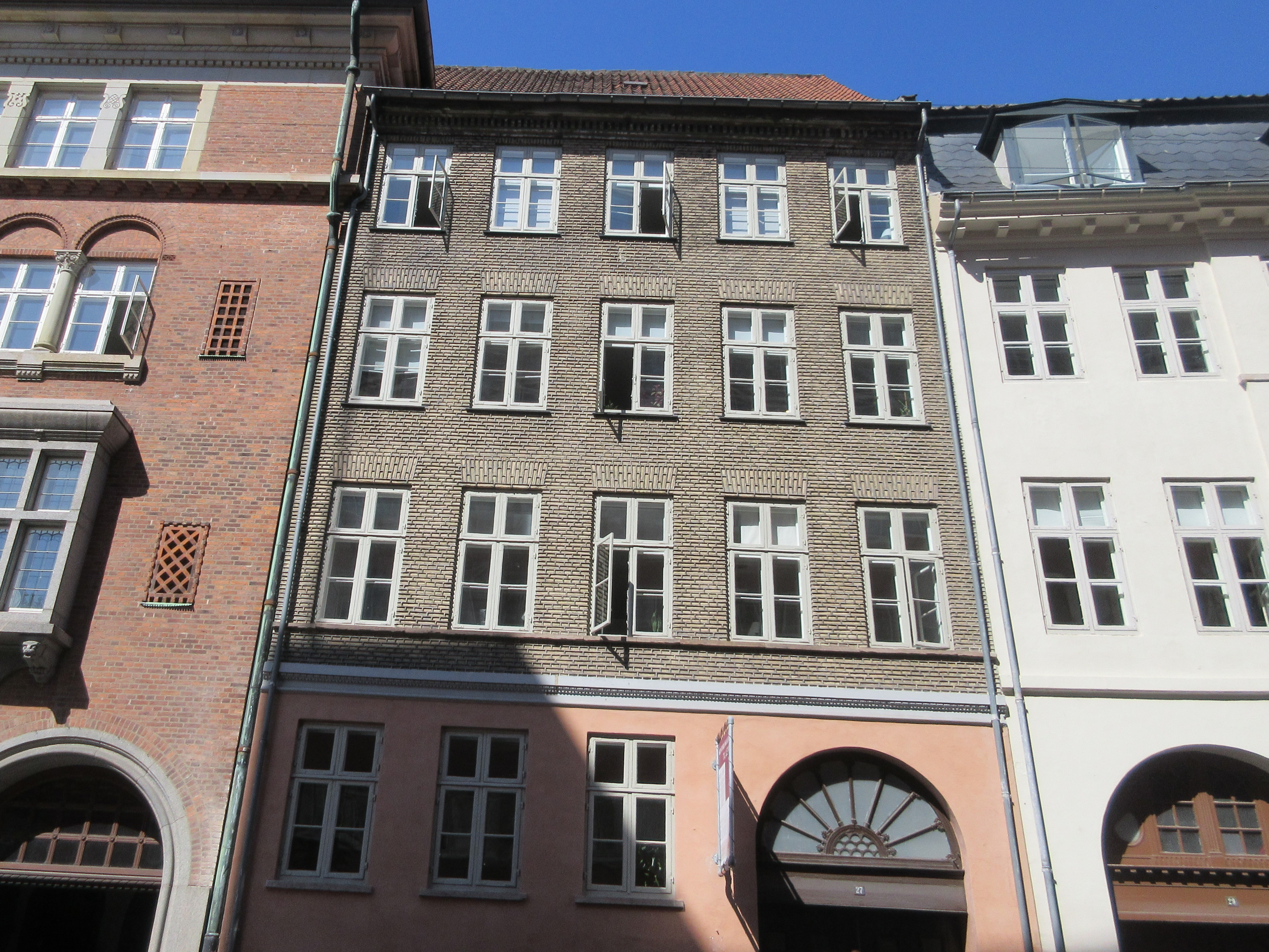
- Interactive map of the Nørregade 27 area

General information
- Location: Copenhagen, Denmark
- Coordinates: 55°40′49.66″N 12°34′15.6″E
- Completed: 1832

Nørregade 27 is a Neoclassical building situated on Nørregade in central Copenhagen, Denmark. It was constructed for a master tanner in the 1830s after the previous building on the site had been destroyed in the British bombardment of Copenhagen in 1807. In 1907, it was acquired by KTAS and merged with the adjacent Telephone House. In 1931, Nørregade 29 was also acquired by KTAS and merged with the complex. Nørregade 27 and Nørregade 29 were both listed in the Danish registry of protected buildings and places in 1939.

== History ==
=== Site history, 1689–1830s ===
The property was listed in Copenhagen's first cadastre from 1689 as No. 46 in Northern Quarter, owned by brewer Rasmus Markussen. Markussen had owned the property since at least 1671. He was still mentioned as its owner in 1703. By, 1713, it had been acquired by brewer Henrik Beckler. On 11 June 1721, he sold it to brewer Claus Clausen Buchwaldt. He was married to Anne Larsdatter. His property was destroyed in the Copenhagen Fire of 1728.

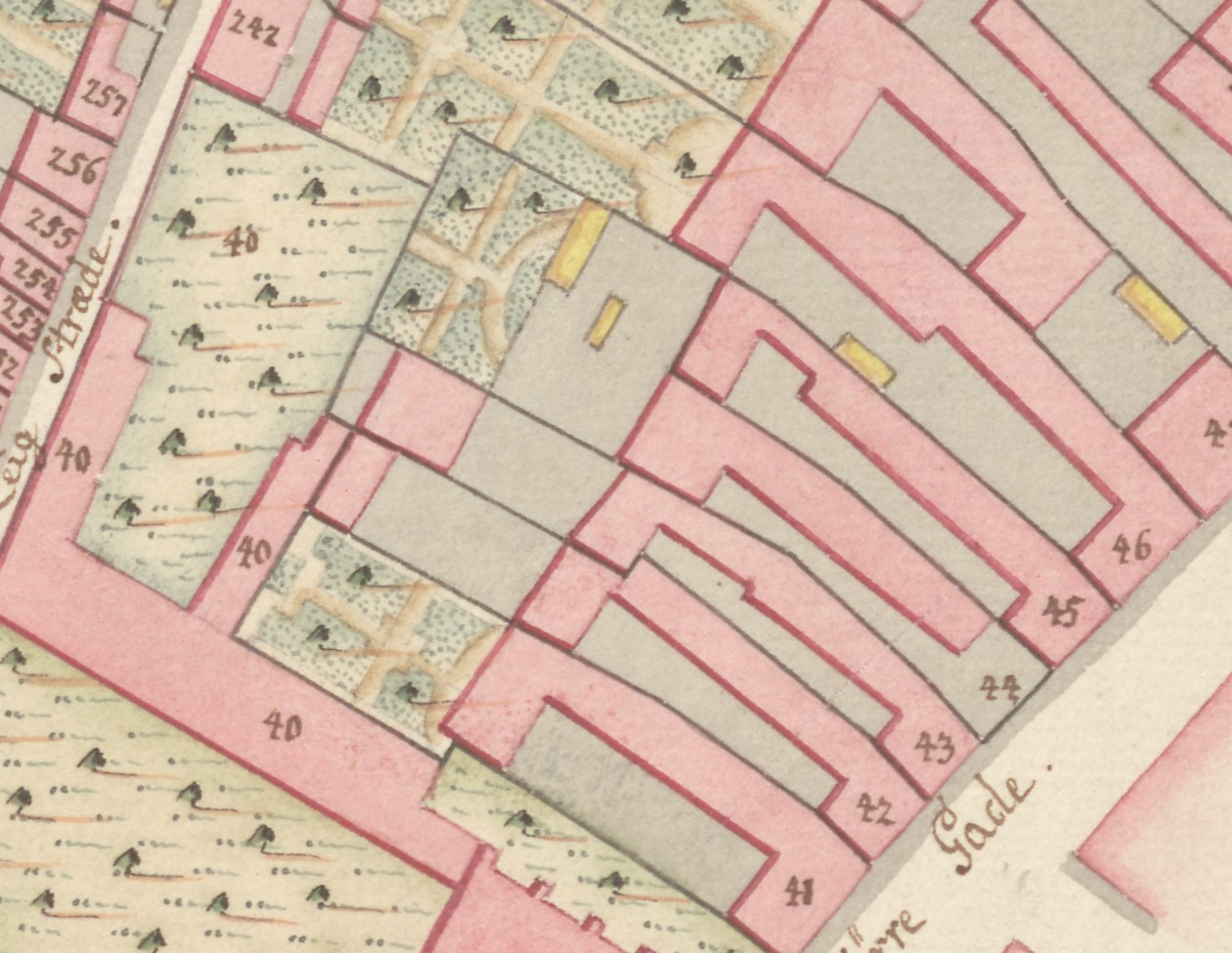
No. 45 seen on a detail from Gedde's district map of Northern Quarter, 1757.

The property was listed in the new cadastre of 1756 as No. 45 in Northern Quarter, owned by brewer Søren Jensen Trille.

The property was later acquired by brewer Villads Christensen Bugge (1727–1801). Born in Jutland, he had most likely come to Copenhagen as a soldier. He had later worked as a brewery worker before establishing himself first as a grocer 8spæjhøker), then as a distiller and finally as a brewer.

On 4 May 1762, Bugge married to Karen Andersen (1723–1785). On 9 December 1785, just four months after the death of his first wife, he was married to Bertha Kirstine Michelsen (1764–1829).

At the time of the 1787 census, Villads and Birte Christine Bugge resided in the building with their one-year-old daughter Catrina Maria Bugge, Bugge's 14-year-old son Anders Bygge (by his first wife), two brewery workers and two maids.

At the 1801 census, B. K. Bugge resided in the building with her five children (aged five to 15), two brewery workers, a caretaker a male servant and two maids.

The property was listed in the new cadastre of 1806 as No. 39 in Northern Quarter, owned by brewer Bering. The following year, his property was destroyed during the British bombardment of Copenhagen in 1807.

=== Lassen and the new building ===
The present building on the site was constructed in 1838-39 for black smith Hans Lars Larsen.

Lassen's property was home to six households at the 1840 census. Hans Lars Larsen resided on the first floor of the rear wing. He lived there with his wife Oline Johanne Larsen (née Rasmussen), their six children (aged one to 18), an apprentice, two male servants and two maids. Richardt Dyrhauge (1799–1873), a senior clerk, resided on the ground floor of the front wing with his wife Kristine Pagh, their two children (aged four and seven) and one maid. Vilhelmine von Barner, widow of a kammerjunker, resided on the first floor with two children (aged 19 and 20( and one maid. Julius Schwartzen (1802–1875), an actor at the Royal Danish Theatre, resided on the second floor with his wife Jacobine Marie Jensine (née Stolp, 1805–1809). Vilhelm Friederick Suuckenberg, a businessman (mægler), resided on the third floor with his wife Johanne Maria (née Müller) and a maid. Hans Christiansen. a hotel patron, resided on the ground floor of the rear wing with his wife Caren Petersen, their three children (aged one to 11), two maids, three caretakers, a merchant and a seemstress.

Hans Carl Larsen was some time later licensed as a master tanner. His property was again home to six households at the 1850 census. Lassen resided in "The Smithy" )Smedehuset) with his wife, six children (aged three three to 26), two maids, a caretaker and two lodgers (stockings merchants). The Dyrhaüge family still resided on the ground floor of the front wing. Minna Johannsen, widow of a professor, resided on the first floor with her with her 11-year-old son, a maid and the lodger William Ferdinand Wedell-Wedelsborg (law student). Harald Fæster, a captain in the Royal Danish Navy, resided on the second floor with his wife Hanne Justa von Alles, Marie Rützou and one maid. Wilhelm Frederik Sunckenberg still lived on the third floor with his wife, their two youngest children (aged two and 10), their 12-year-old lodger Georg Wilhelm Gothwerdt Muller and two maids. Hans Christiansen and Caren Petersen Christiansen still lived on the ground floor of the rear wing.

Lassen was still the owner of the building at the 1850 census. Harald Fæster was also still living in the building. Johanne Marie Sunckenberg. who had now become a widow, resided in a third apartment with two daughters, a maid and a lodger. Anders Jensen, resided in the building with his wife Marie Jensen (née Madsen), their one-year-old daughter, a male servant and a maid.

Christian Heinrich Andersen, a customs official, resided in the building with his brothers Anders Didrich Andersen (a joiner), three nephews (sons of a third brother) and a maid. Jacob Hansen, a workman, resided in the building with his wife Maren Larsen (née Jensen) and tanner Laurits Frederik Larsen. Hans and Karen Christiansen were also still residents in the building.

=== 1880 census ===
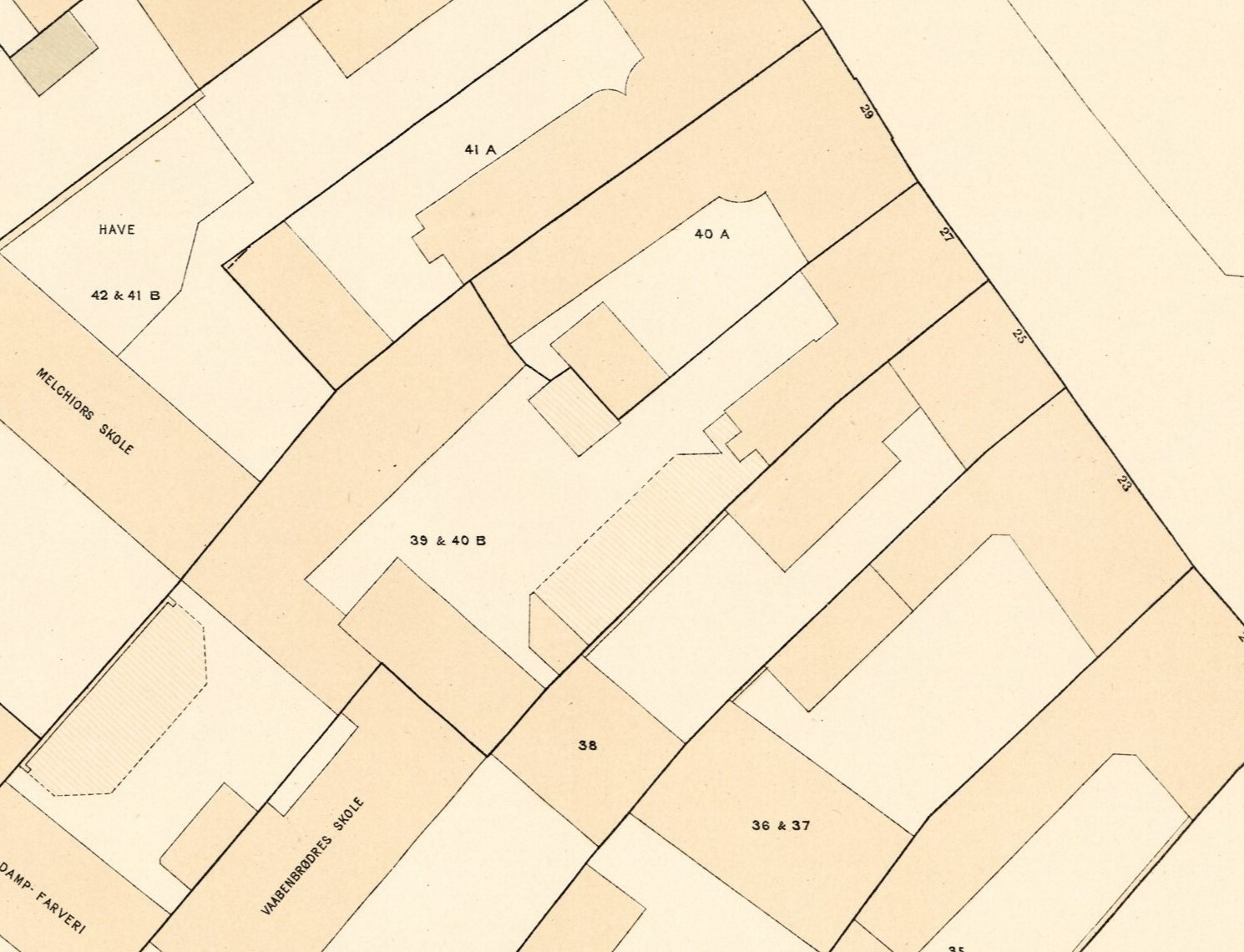
No. 39&40 seen on a detail from one of Berggreen's block plans of Northern Quarter.

The property was home to 50 residents at the 880 census. Johanne Marie Sünckenberg resided on the ground floor with her daughter Eline Vilhelmine Caroline Sünckenberg and one maid. Robert Groch, a businessman (grosserer), resided on the first floor with his wife Juliane Margrethe Groch and one maid. Herman Christian Larsen, a glovemaker, resided on the second floor with his wife Ida Margrethe Larsen, their three-year-old son, a housekeeper and a maid. Carl Ludvig Larsen, a businessman (grosserer), resided on the third floor with his wife Elisabeth Jacobine Dorothea Larsen, their two-uear-old son Niels Frederik Larsen, a housekeeper and a maid. Peter Siligmann Rasmussen. a haulier, resided on the ground floor of the cross wing with his wife Marie Anna Petroline Rasmussen, their two children (aged 13 and 18= and an employee. Niels Jensen, a whool merchant, resided on the first floor on the cross wing (Mellembygningen) with his wife Ane Marie Jensen, their six children (aged one to 17) and two maids. The remaining residents lived in mostly small households in the side wing.

=== 20th century ===
In 1899, KTAS (Copenhagen Telephone Company) acquired the adjacent buildings at Nørregade 21–36. The architect Fritz Koch was subsequently charged with designing a new headquarters. Construction began in 1900 but progressed slowly due to financial difficulties. In 1909. Jens Ingwersen took over the project following Koch's death in 1906 and the complex was finally inaugurated in 1909. In 1907, Nørregade 27 was also acquired by KTAS. In 1931, Nørregade 29 was also acquired by the company.

== Architecture ==
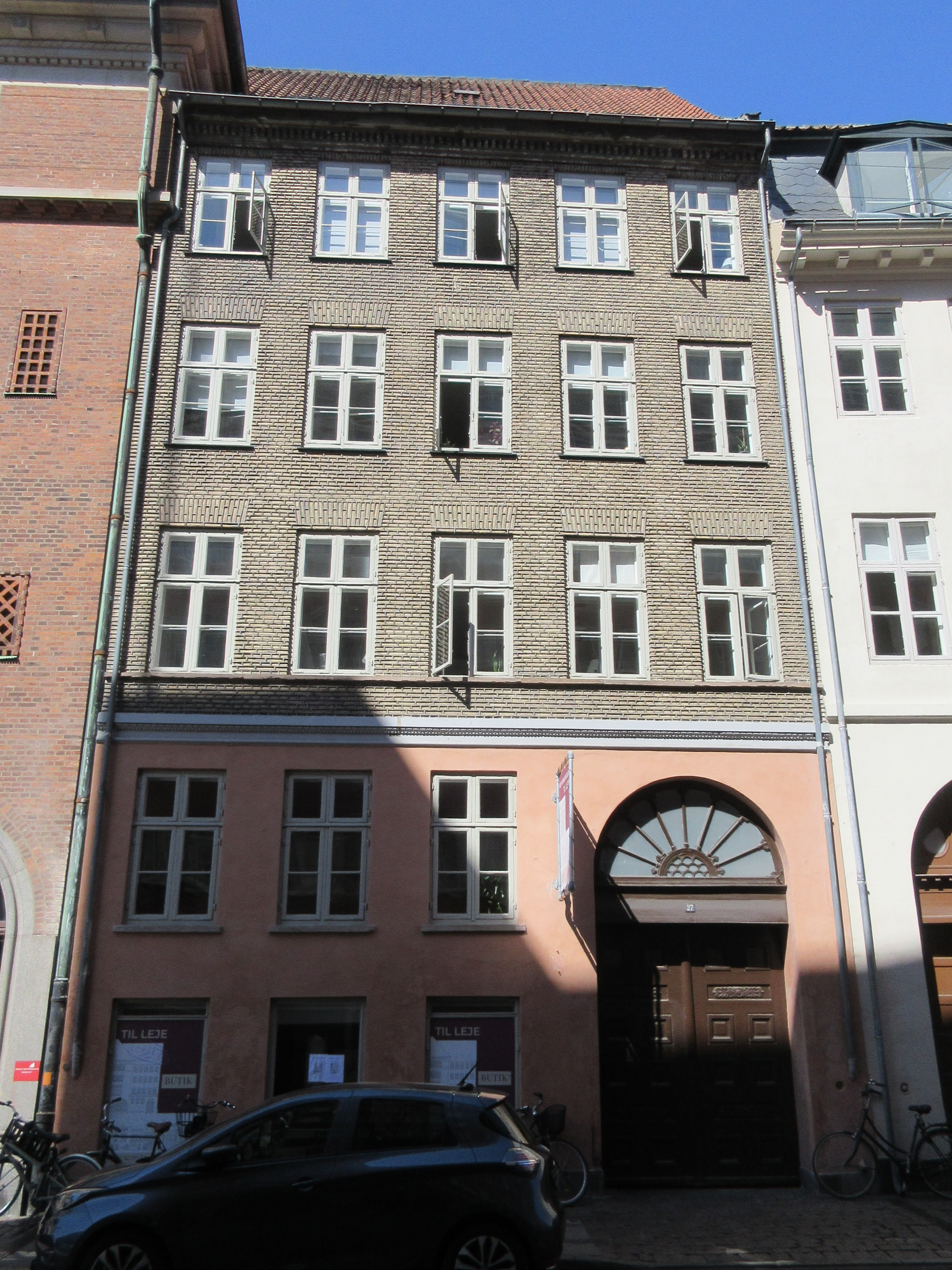
Nørregade 27 in 2023.

Nørregade 27 is a three-winged complex constructed in yellow brick with four storeys over a walk-out basement. The facade is plastered and grey-painted on the ground floor and the exposed part of the basement. The undressed, upper part of the facade is finished with extruded joints (in Denmark known as "Hamburg joints"), a band of Nexø sandstone below the first-floor windows and a dentillated cornice. The gatein the two northern bays is topped by a fanlight. The pitched roof is clad in red tile. A side wing extends from the rear wide of the front wing along the south side of a small courtyard. Rge far end of the side wing is attached to the rear wing. All the exterior walls facing the courtyard are dressed and yellow-painted.

Nørregade 28 and Nørregade 29 were jointly listed in the Danish registry of protected buildings and places in 1939. The side wing and rear wong are not part of the heritage listing.

== Today ==
The interior of the building is now physically integrated with the interior of the adjacent Telephone House and Nørregade 29. A corridor runs through the building. Only the lower part of the original staircase has been preserved.
