= Københavns VUC =

School in Copenhagen, Denmark

Coordinates: 55.6826°N 12.5791°E

- KVUC
- Type: Secondary education
- Rector: Anita Lindquist Henriksen
- Administrative staff: 330
- Location: Copenhagen, Denmark
- Website: http://www.kvuc.dk/

Københavns VUC, often referred to as KVUC, is a school of secondary education in Copenhagen, Denmark. The school offers the 2-year Higher Preparatory Examination (HF) programme and supplementary courses (GSK) to the Matriculation examination (STX) within a range of disciplines. The school has since 2007 been an independent self-owning educational institution under the supervision of the state, managed by a board in conjunction with a principal who manages the day-to-day operations.

KVUC is based in two buildings in downtown Copenhagen, known respectively as V8 (Vognmagergade 8) and S1 (Sankt Petri Passage 1) and located approximately 600 metres apart.

== Campus ==
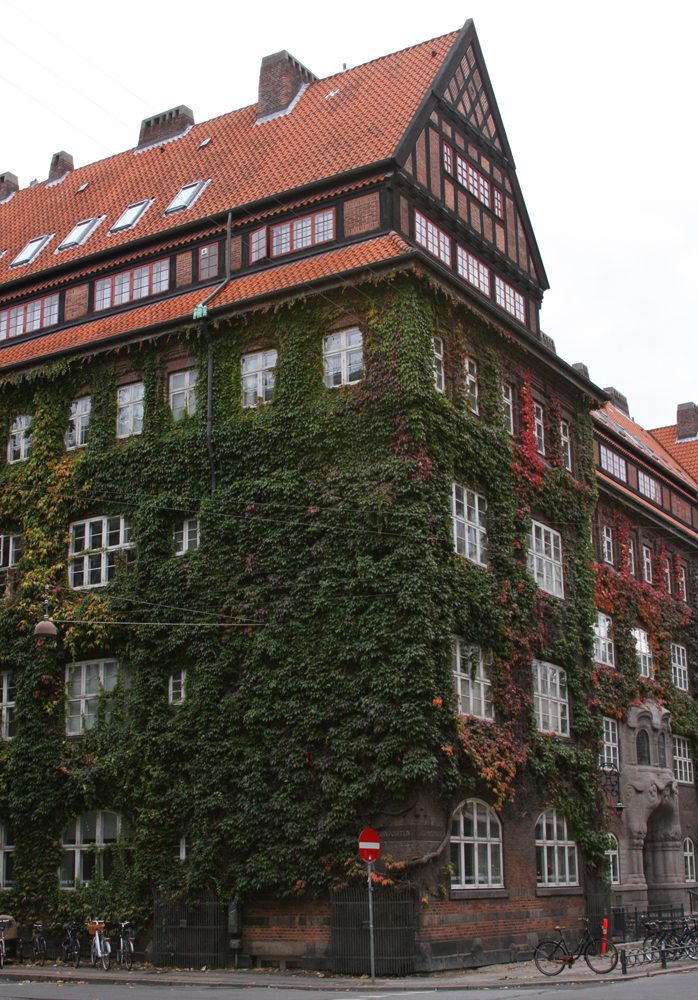
V8 Building

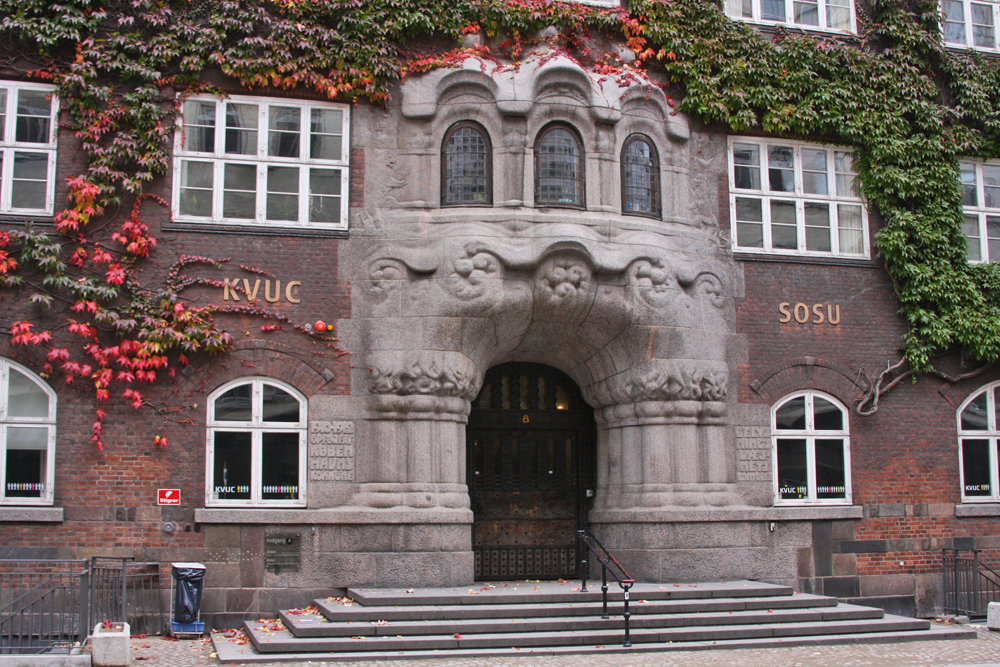
The main entrance at Vognmagergade 8

KVUC's main campus is known as V8 after its address on Vognmagergade 8 in the city centre. The building which overlooks Rosenborg Castle Garden is the former headquarters of Københavns Belysningsvæsen from 1913. It has a floor area of approximately 20,000 square metres and was designed by Gustav Bartholin Hagen in collaboration with Rolf Schroeder.

The Sankt Petri Passage complex (SP1) dates from 1900–1909 and is the former headquarters of KTAS (now TDC). It is located close to Nørreport station.

== Programmes ==
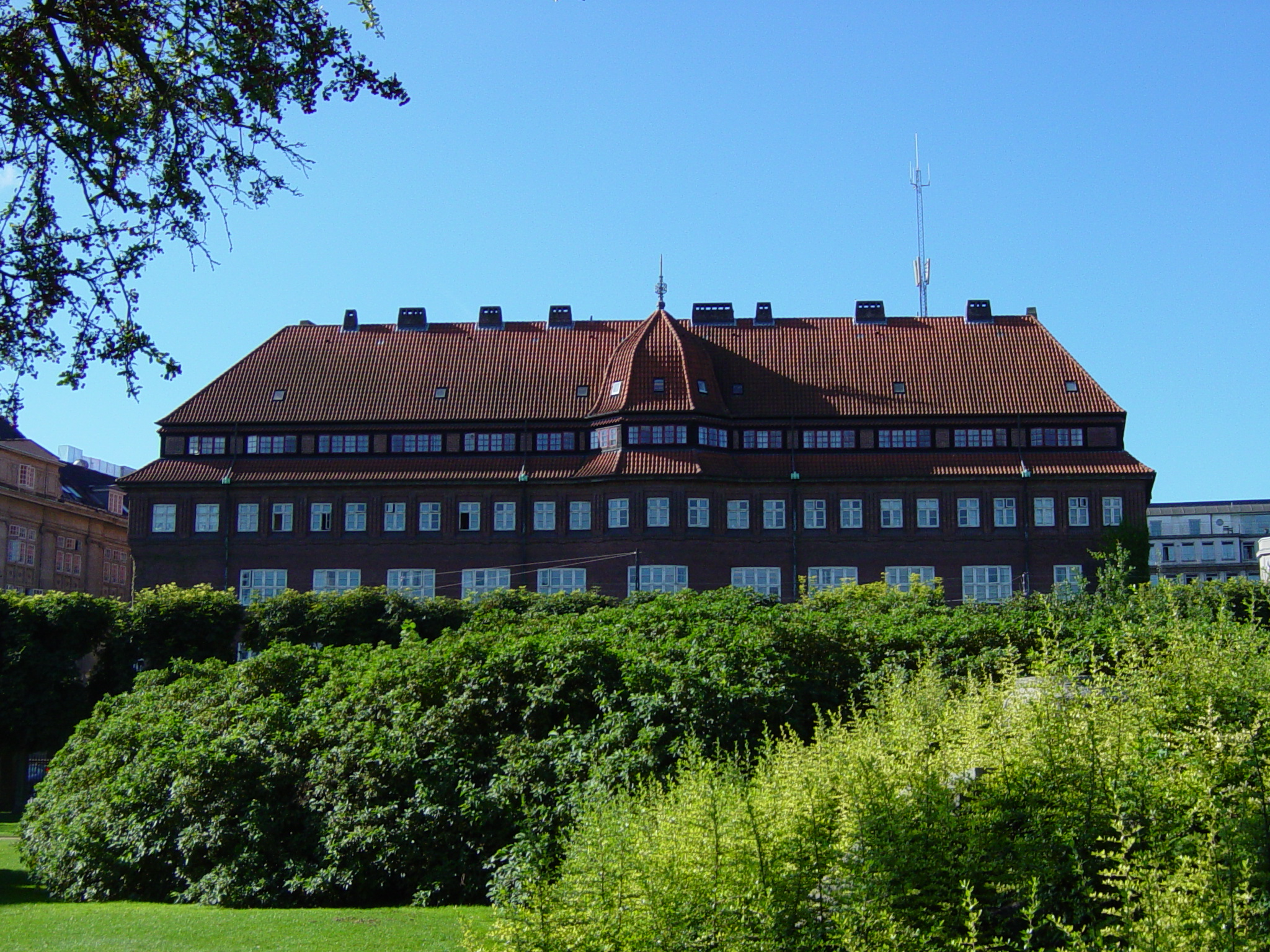
V8's façade on Gothersgade viewed from Rosenborg Castle Garden 8

KVUC offers four main educational programmes, each divided into elective courses based on the wishes of the individual student. The Almen Voksenddannelse (AVU) programme is meant for adults seeking to pass the primary school exams. The Higher Preparatory Examination (HF) programme is a lighter 2-year version of the traditional Matriculation examination (STX). The Gymnasial Supplering (GS) programme consists of individual courses designed to supplement either the STX or the HF programmes in cases where specific classes are necessary or desired. The Forberedende Voksenuddannelse (FVU) is a preparatory course for adults seeking supplementary qualifying training either part-time or full-time. In addition KVUC offers free dyslexia screening and dyslexia education programmes

== See also ==
- Copenhagen Business Academy
- Niels Brock Copenhagen Business College
- SOPU
