= Svanemølle Power Station =

Power station in Copenhagen, Denmark

Svanemølle Power Station Svanemølleværket
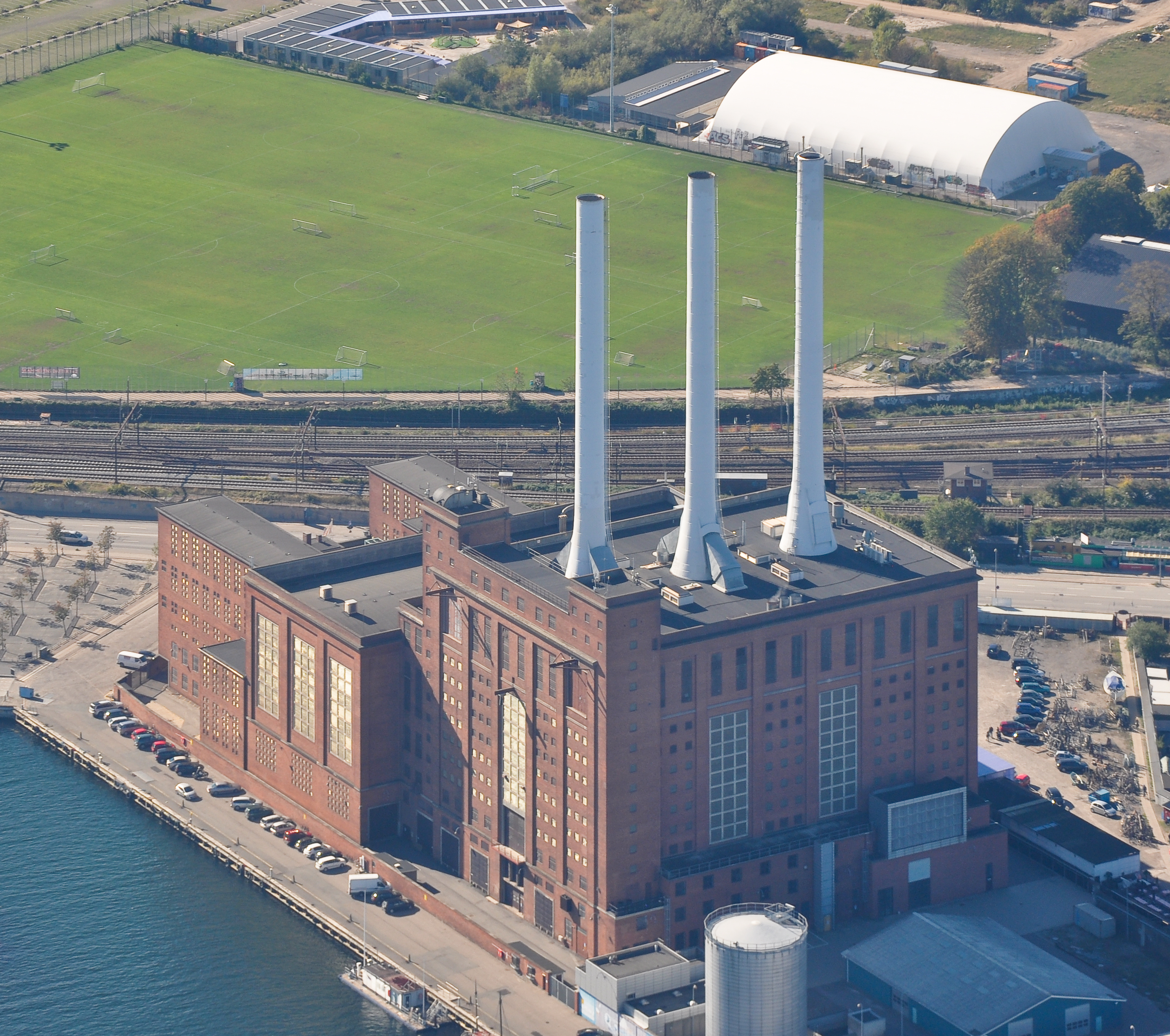
- Svanemølle power station
- Country: Denmark
- Location: Copenhagen
- Coordinates: 55°42′48″N 12°35′17″E
- Status: Operational
- Construction began: 1947
- Commission date: 1953
- Owners: Københavns Belysningsvæsen (1953-2001); Københavns Energi (2001-2006); Ørsted (2006-present)
- Operator: Ørsted

Thermal power station
- Primary fuel: Coal (1953-1985) natural gas (1985-present)
- Cogeneration?: Yes
- Thermal capacity: 355 MJ/s

Power generation
- Nameplate capacity: 81 MW

External links
- Website: www.dongenergy.com/EN/business%20activities/generation/activities/central_power_stations/Pages/svanemoelle_power_station.aspx
- Commons: Related media on Commons

Svanemølle Power Station (Danish: Svanemølleværket) is a natural gas fueled combined heat and power station located at the south side of Svanemølle Bay in the Nordhavnen of Copenhagen, Denmark. Its primary task is to supply district heating to the district-heating network of Greater Copenhagen.

== History ==
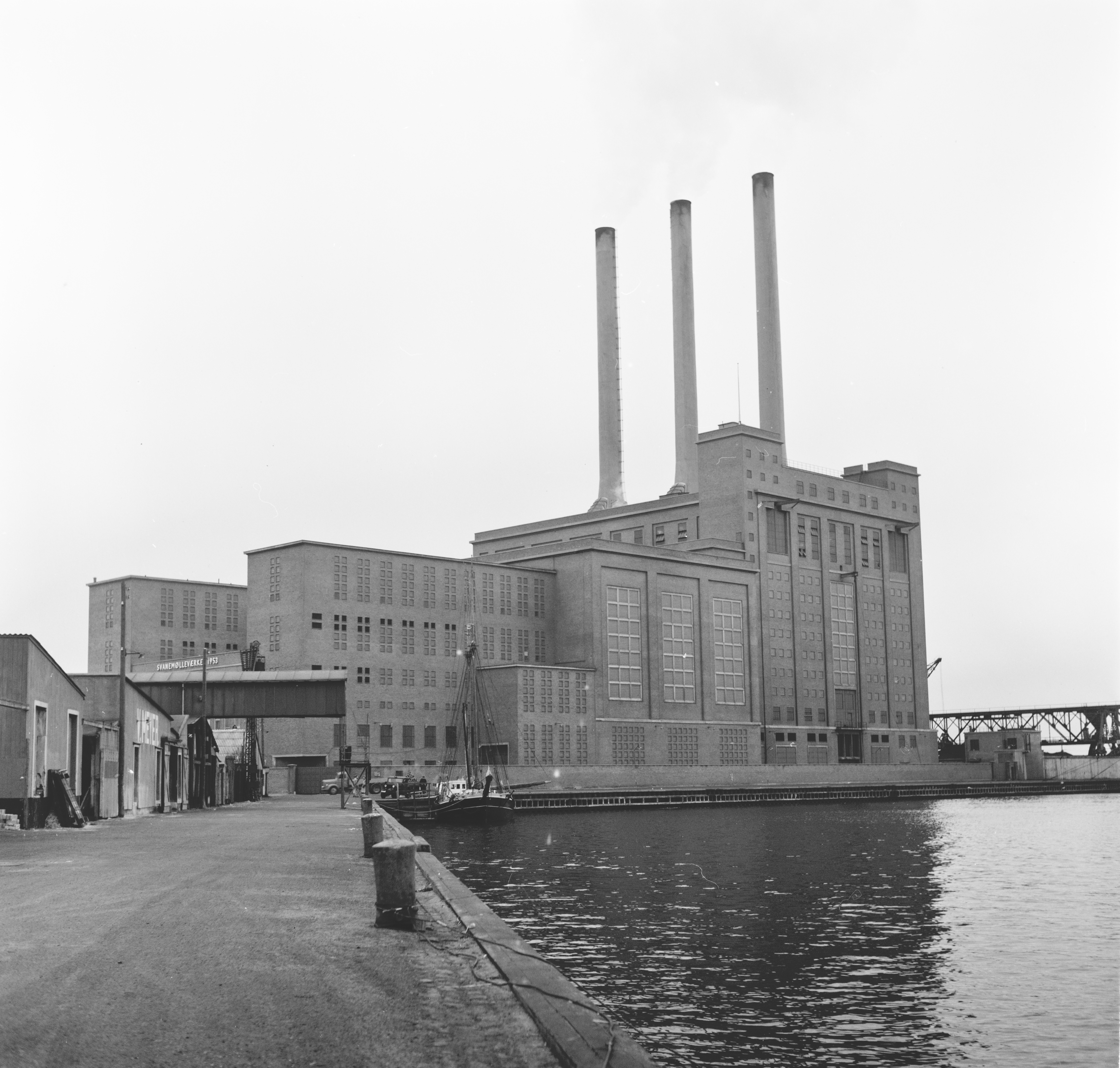
The Svanemølle Power Station in 1956.

Svanemølle Power Station was built by Københavns Belysningsvæsen between 1947 and 1953 to supplement H. C. Ørsted Power Station in the Kongens Enghave. It was designed by Louis Hygom who had already carried out expansions and adaptions of the H. C. Ørsted plant in 1924 and 1932.

The plant was originally coal-fired but was converted to natural gas and oil firing in 1985. In 1995 two old generators were replaced by a gas turbine referred to as unit 7.

== Architecture ==
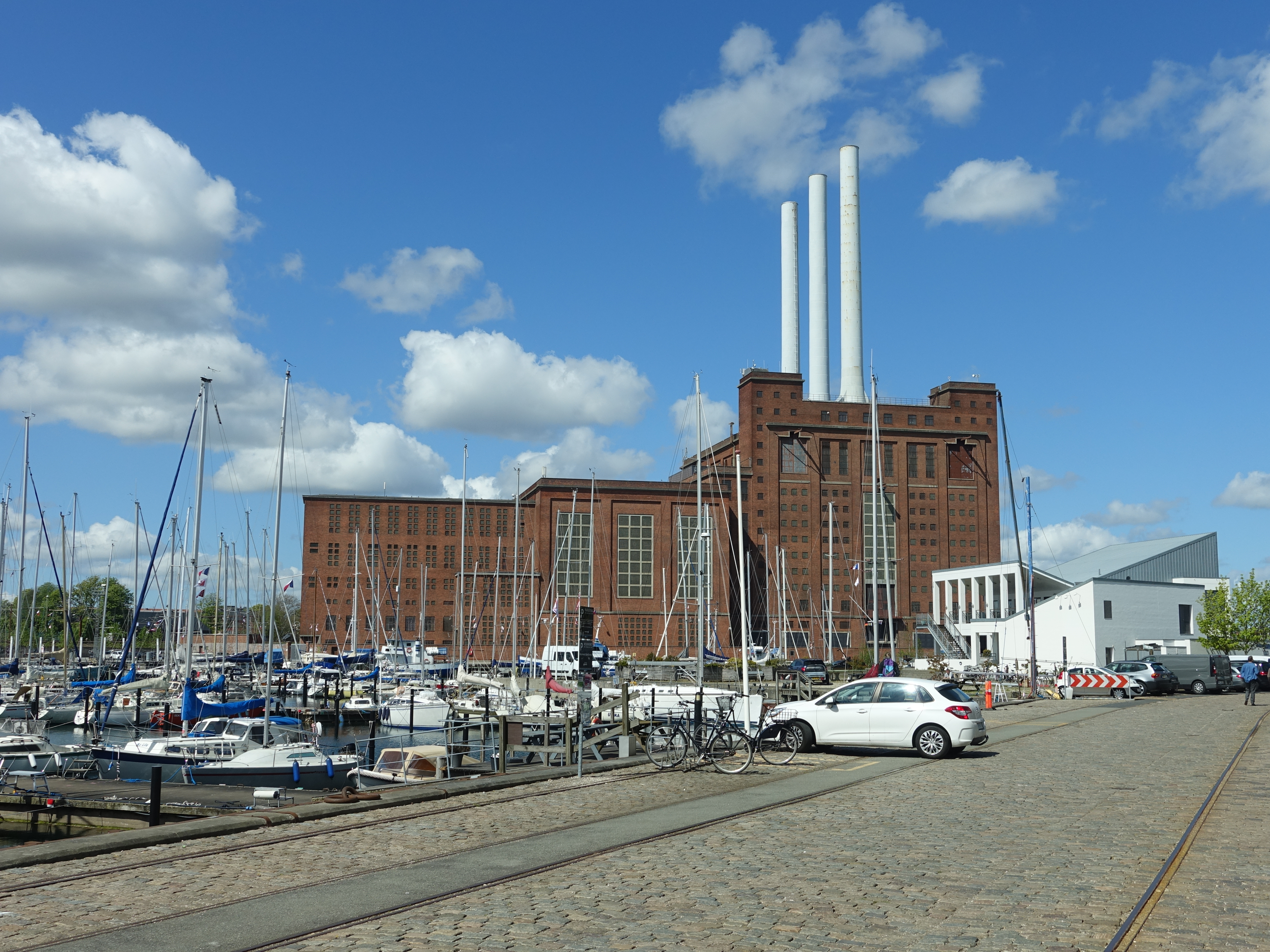
Svanemølle Power Station

Svanemølle Power Station is built in reinforced concrete and dressed in red brick. Its constellation of boxes and cubic volumes is inspired by American highrise and factory architecture of the 1930s.

== See also ==
- List of power stations in Denmark
- List of power stations
