= Louis Hygom =

Danish architect

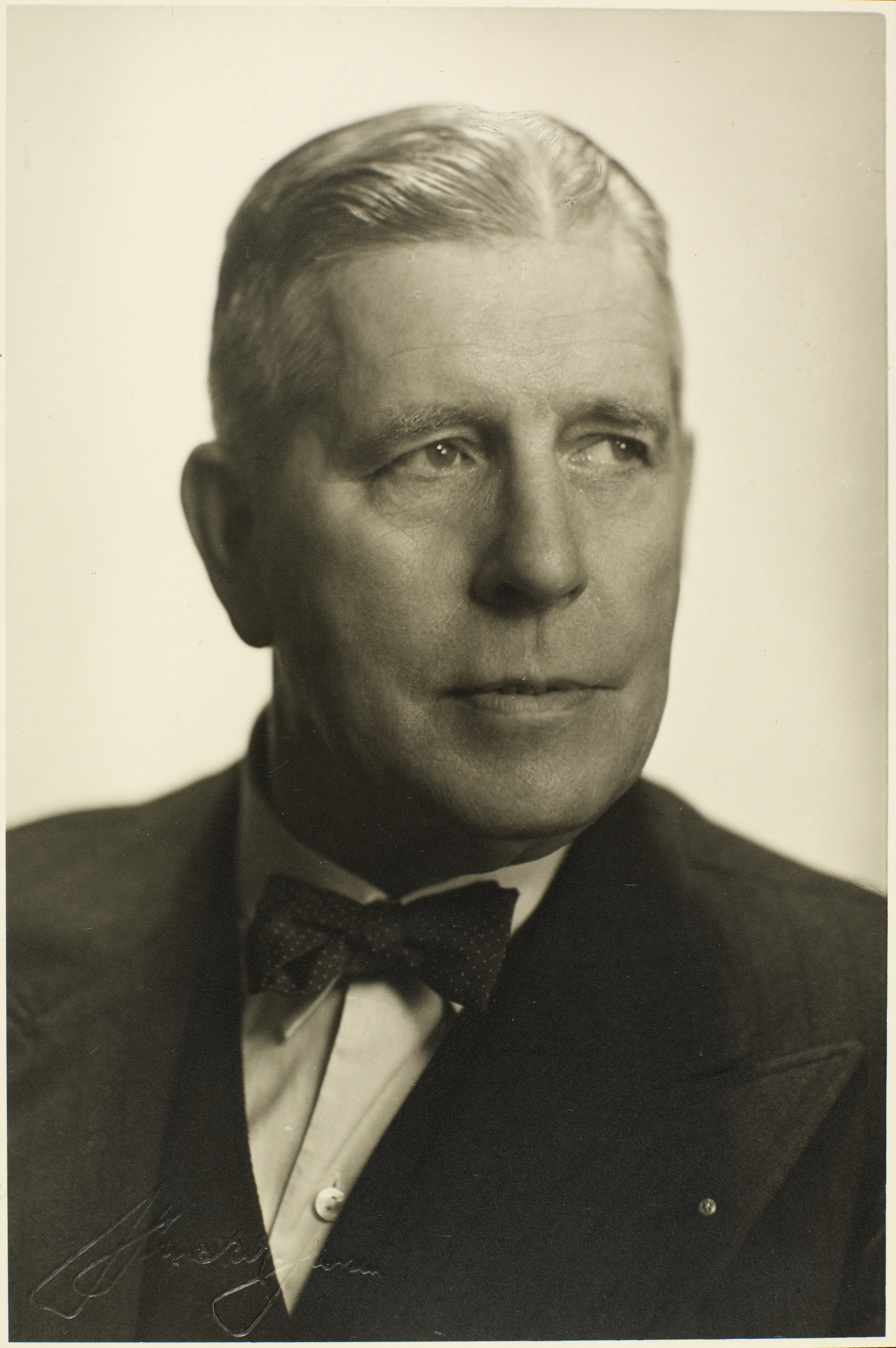
- Born: 4 October 1879; Copenhagen, Denmark
- Died: 14 January 1950 (aged 70); Rungsted, Denmark
- Occupation: Architect

Signature
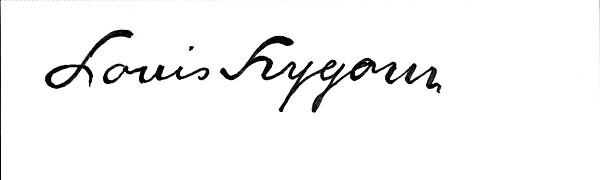

Louis Hygom (4 October 1879 – 14 January 1950) was a Danish architect active in the first half of the 20th century. He designed the Svanemølle Power Station in Copenhagen as well as two extensions to H. C. Ørsted Power Station.

== Early life and education ==
Hygom was born on 4 October 1879 in Copenhagen, the son of physician Frantz Carl Claus H. and Christine Mathea Nielsen. He attended Copenhagen Technical School and completed a mason's apprenticeship in 1899. He briefly attended the Royal Danish Academy of Fine Arts in 1903–1905 but discontinued his studies to pursue practical training in the studios of city architect Ludvig Fenger and P.V. Jensen-Klint.

== Career ==
Hylling-Bjær. Liseleje.

Hygom started his career by working as an executing architect for a number of other architects, including Axel Preisler (Dansk Folkeforsikringsanstalt) and Ulrik Plesner (Hafnia Building). In 1899, he was a co-founder of Den Frie Arkitektforening. In this early part of his career, he was strongly influenced by trends in British architecture, such as Hamstead Garden Suburb (1907) and Baillie Scott's Houses and Gardens (1912). In the 1920s, he increasingly relied on Neoclassicism for inspiration. Later in his career, he mostly designed larger housing estates in a restrained functionalist style.

== Personal life ==
On 2 November 1915, Hygom married Helene Magda Jahn (1885–1967).

== Selected works ==
=== Villas and country houses ===
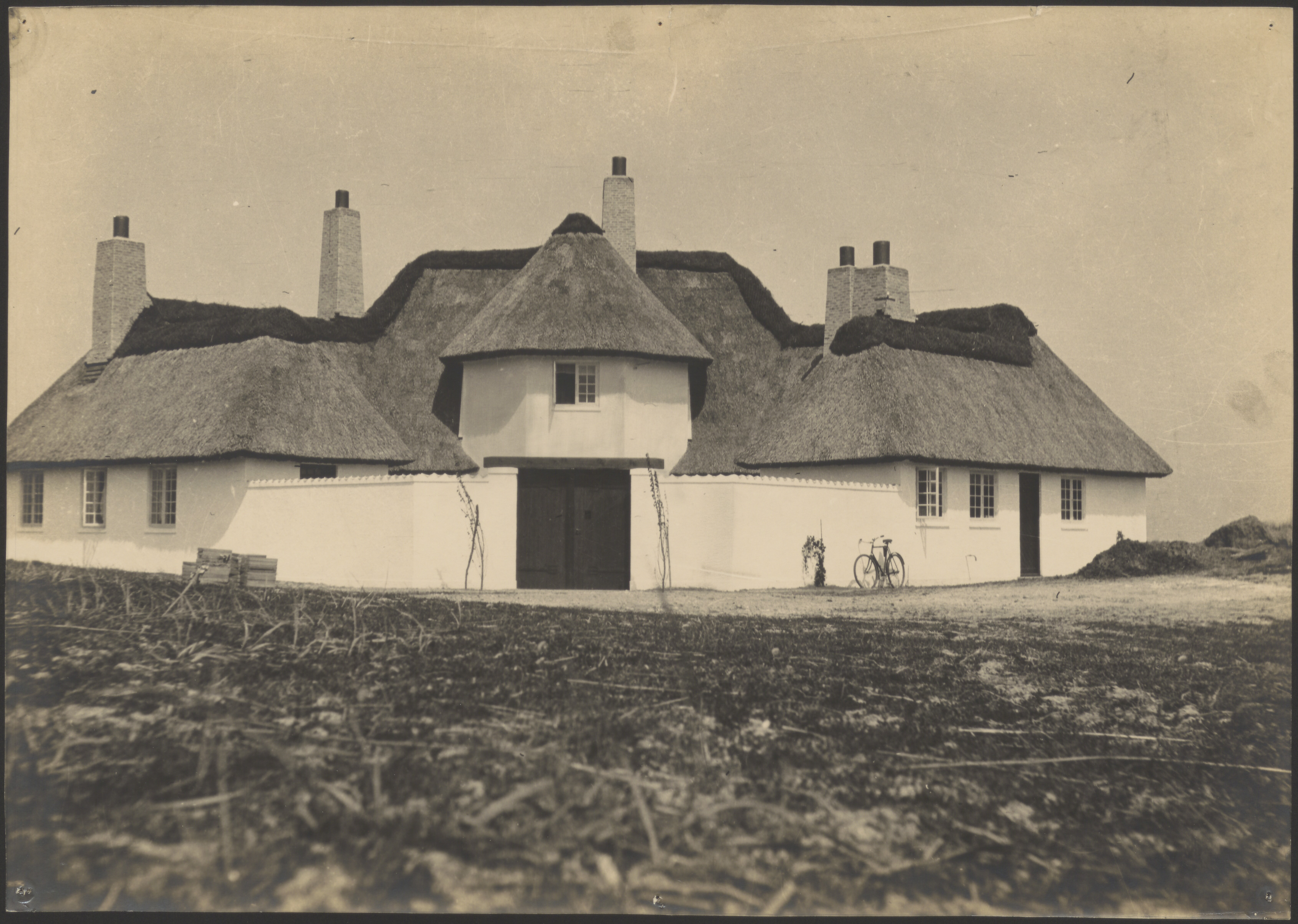
Bjærg.jpg, Liseleje.

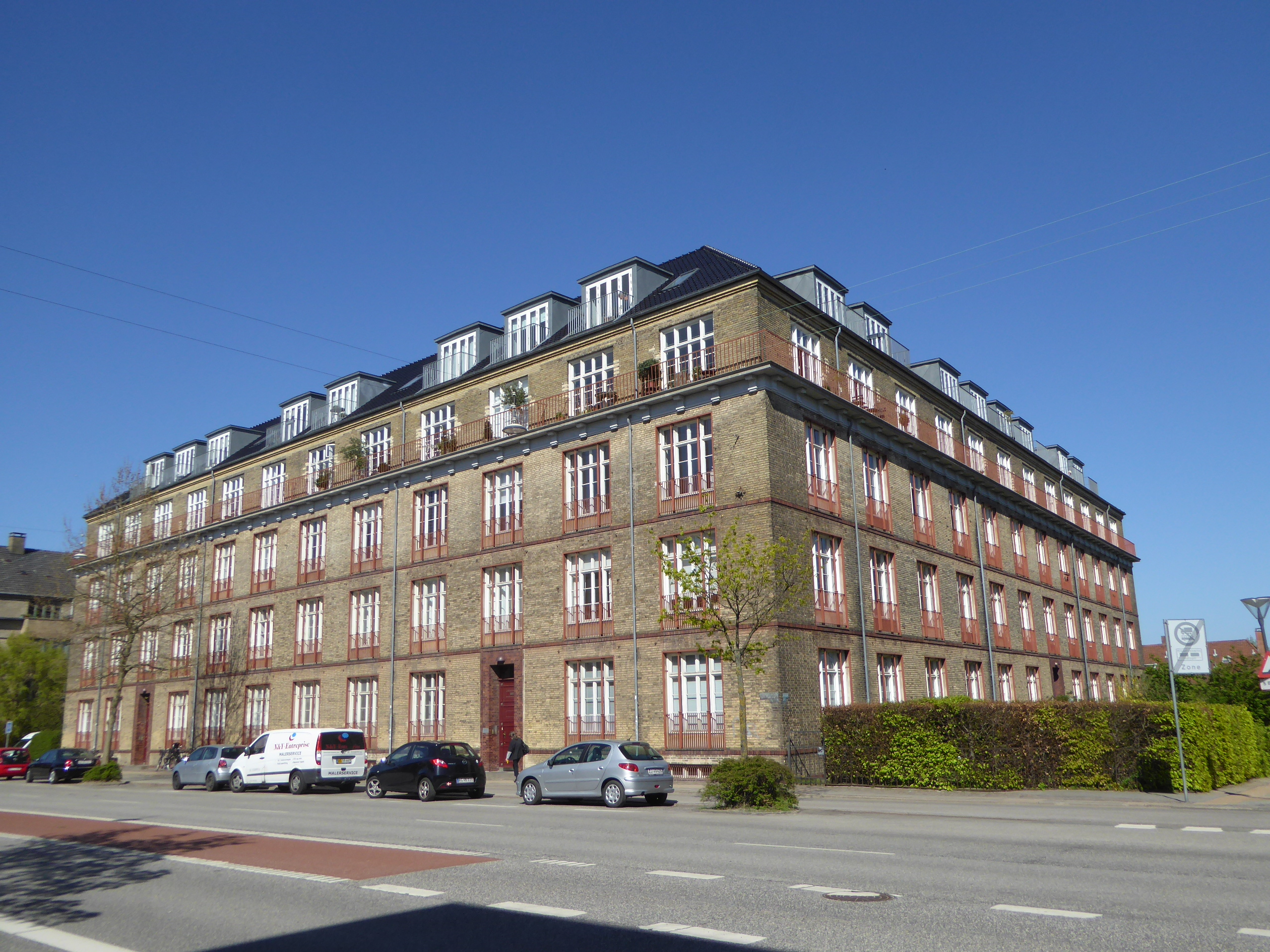
Strandvejen 16.

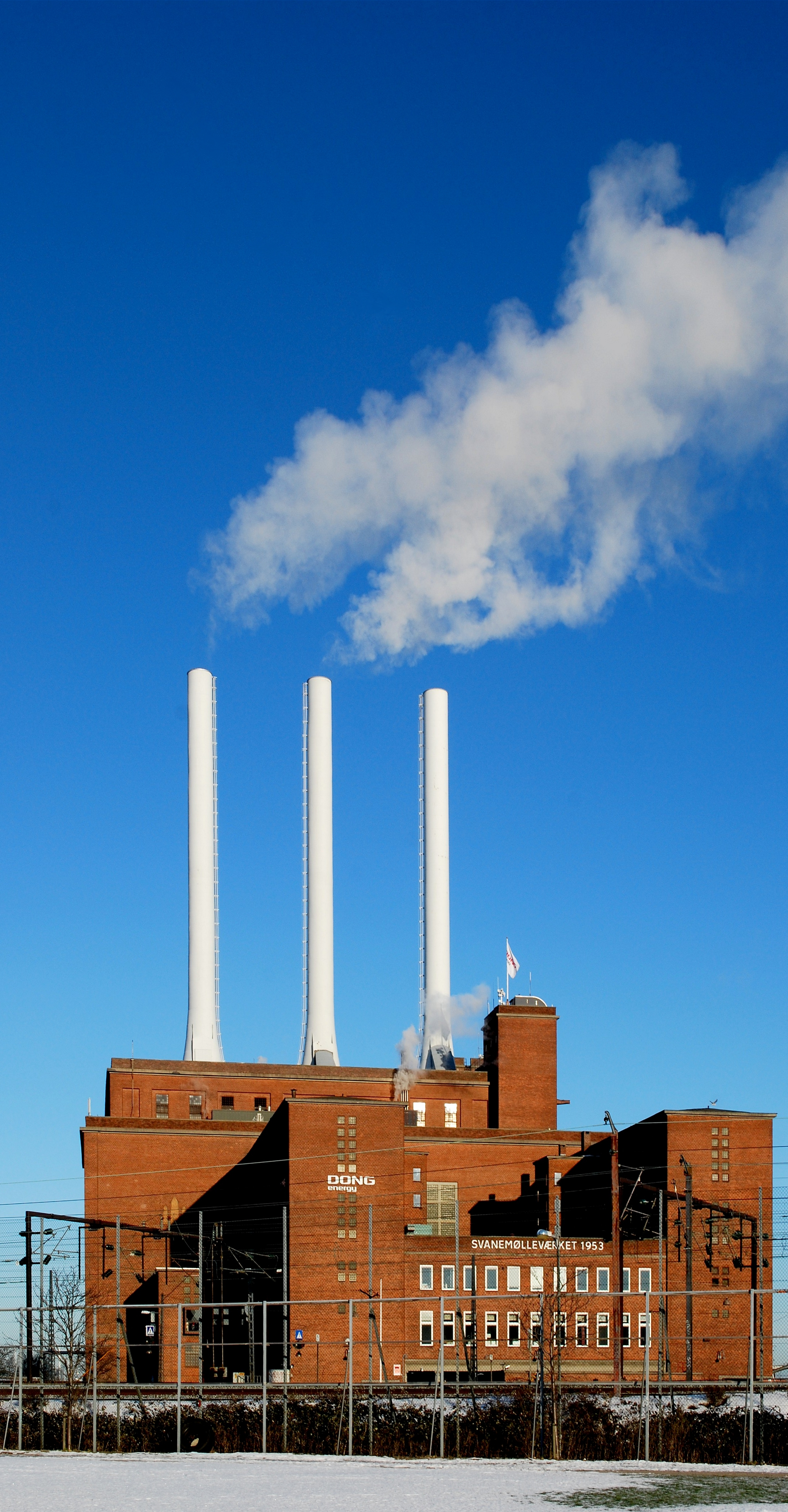
Svanemølleværket.

- Hyllingebjærg (summer house for W. Bendix), Liseleje (1913)
- House for Edvard Brandes, Nærumvej 266 (1915)
- Summer house for Ove Ringberg, Blokhus (1916
- House for GeorgHolm, Skotterup (1916–17)
- Dalsborg, Rørtangsvej 1, Snekkersten (1917)
- Hegnsholt, Grønholt (1920)
- Doctor's House, Farum (1923)
- House for Wengel, Øster Allé 29, Copenhagen (1923)
- Tjørnekrogen (masterplan and five southernmost houses), Gentofte (1923, awarded by Gentofte Kommune)
- Manager's House, Kunstindustrimuseum (1925)
- House for P. Munch, Øster Allé 5 (1926)
- Sanskevej 15 C, Rungsted Kyst (1927)
- Sølystparken 1, Klampenborg (1937)

=== Housing estates and apartment buildings ===
- Municipal housing estate, Borups Allé (1918), ved Refsnæsgade and Sjællandsgade (1922)
- Block for Landmandsbanken, Genforeningspladsen (1923)
- Rødegård, ved Genforeningspladsen 17-29, Hvidkildevej 18A-34 (1933)
- Isafjord for Arbejdernes Andels Boligforening, Isafjordsgade/Egilsgade/Njalsgade (1926)
- Housing estate for KAB, Gentofte Lake (1922)
- Block for Københavns Kommune, Jagtvej 157 A-G/Skrivergangen/Lersø Parkallé/Rådmandsgade 84 (1928)
- Row houses, Svanevænget 6-34 (1928)
- Østerled/Strandvejen 16 B-C (1928)
- Sygeplejerskernes Hus, Tagensvej 96 (1930)
- Vibevej 49-65, Tornskadestien 1-17 and 2-18, Mejsevænget 1-17 og 2-16, Rørsangervej 2-4, Nattergalevej 1-11 og Hillerødgade 68-72 (1931–32, with Emanuel Monberg)
- AABs bebyggelse ved Frederikssundsvej og Hovedvangen (1936)
- Kvindehjemmet, Jagtvej 153 B (1943, totalt ombygget 2006-08)
- Aldersrenteboliger for Københavns Kommune på Tuborgvej (1944)

=== Other ===
- Extensions of H. C. Ørsted Power Station, Sydhavnen (1924 and 1930–32, with Valdemar Schmidt)
- Akkumulatorbygning, Østre Elektricitetsværk, Øster Allé 1 (1939–40)
- Extension of Gothersgade Power Station, Gothersgade(1943, demolished)
- Svanemølle Power Station, Nordhavnen (1947–53)
- Transformatorstation, Sydhavns Plads 6 (1949)
- Transformatorstation, Valby Langgade 2
