= Vognmagergade =

Street in Copenhagen, Denmark

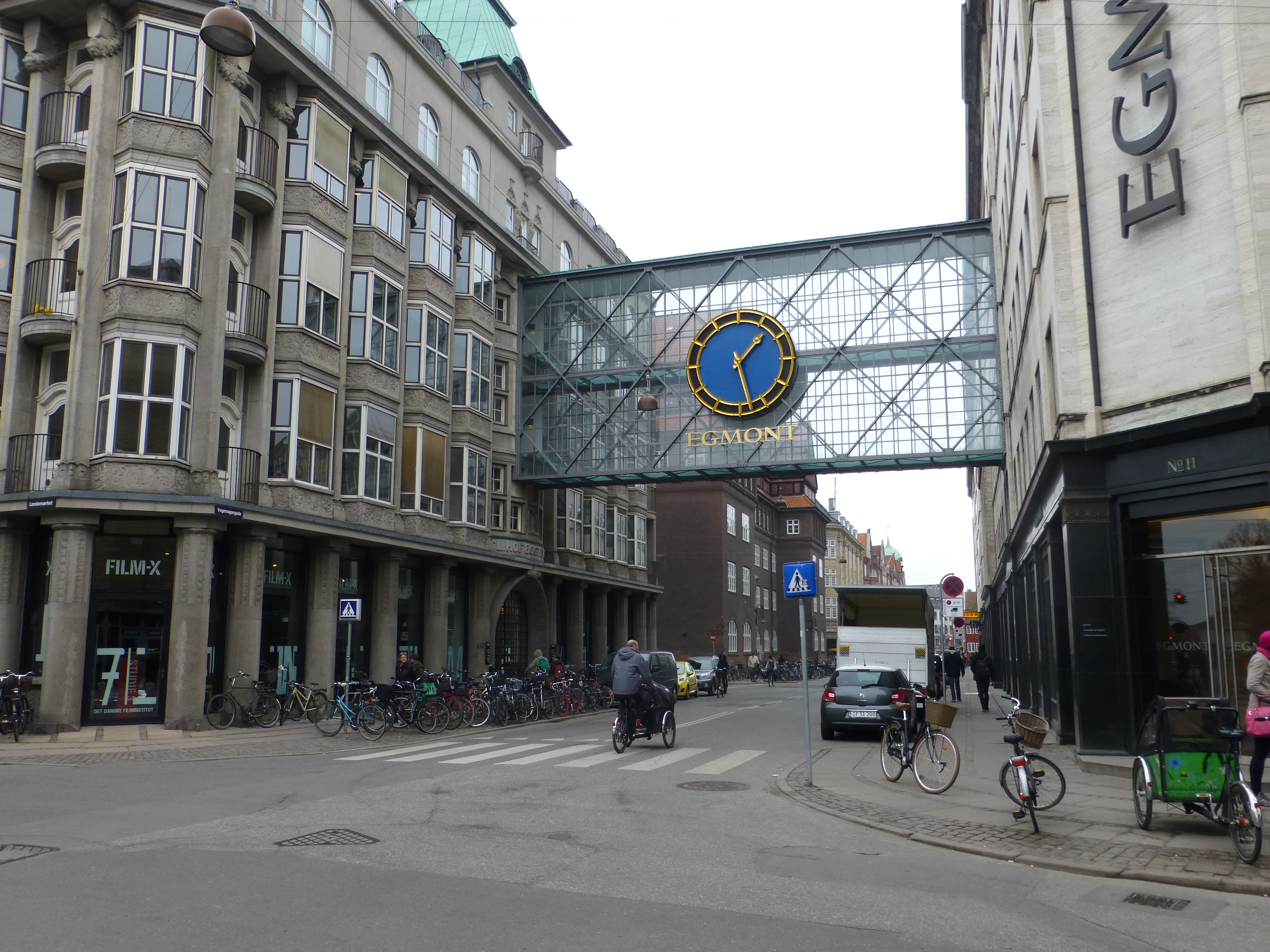
- Interactive map of Vognmagergade
- Length: 154 m (505 ft)
- Location: Indre By, Copenhagen, Denmark
- Postal code: 1120
- Nearest metro station: Nørreport
- Coordinates: 55°40′56.51″N 12°34′43.55″E

Vognmagergade (lit. "Wainwright Street") is a street located one block south of Rosenborg Castle Gardens in the Old Town of Copenhagen, Denmark. The street runs from Møntergade in the southeast to Landemærket in the northwest, linking Gammel Mønt with Åbenrå. All the buildings in the street date from the years after an urban renewal project in the 1910s. A dominating feature is a glazed skyway with a clockl and the name Egmont. Københavns VUC, an adult education centre, is based at No. 8.

== History ==
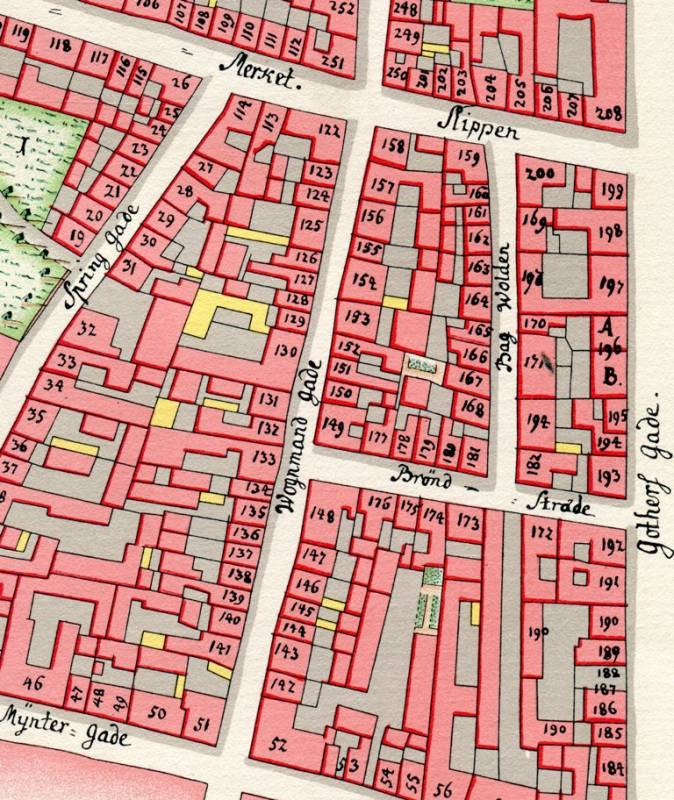
Wognmands Gade seen on a detail from Gedde's district mapm 1757

The street is first referred to as "the Alley Leading to St. Clare's Priory! ("det stræde som løber til Clara Kloster"), but in the 16th century it became known as Wogenmands Gade (Haulier Street) after the many hauliers that lived in the street. The Hauliers Guild House was located on nearby Kultorvet. The name Vognmandsgade was gradually changed to Vognmagergade (Wainwright Street) in the 18th century. The name is thus a result of language change and not any particular concentration of Wainwrights at the site.

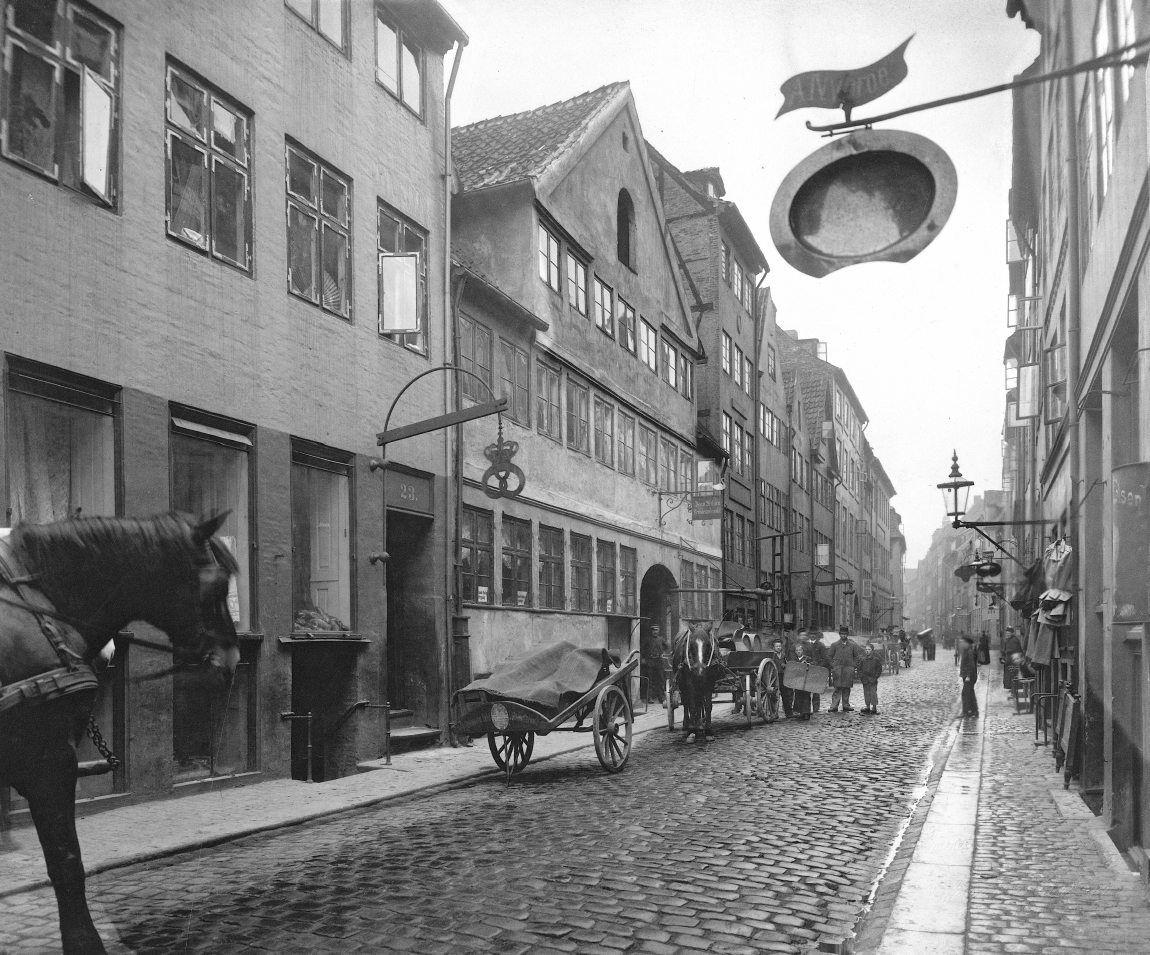
Vognmandsgade photographed by Johannes Hauerslev

The street was historically part of a poor neighbourhood with old, narrow houses. The no longer existing street Store Brøndstræde (Great Well Street) connected the street to Gothersgade to the north. One of the largest buildings in the street was Landmandshotellet (The Farmers Hotel) at the corner with Landemærket.

The so-called Brøndstræde Quarter was demolished in 1910 in the first public urban regeneration programme of its kind in the city.

== Buildings and residents ==
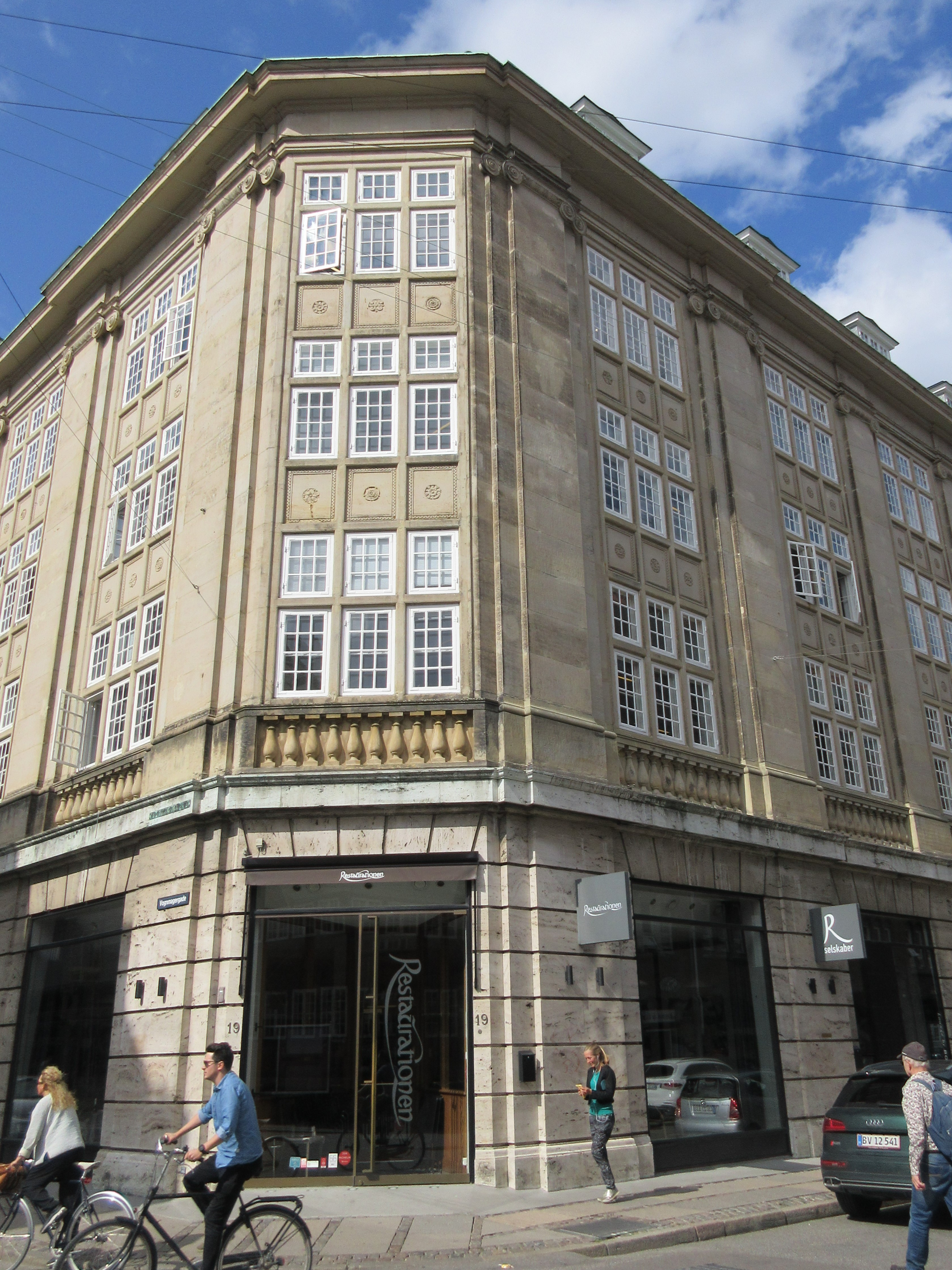
No. 2:Møntergården

The office building Møntergården (No. 2) was built in 1916 for the businessman Anton Carl Illum. It was designed by the architect H.P. Jacobsen (1877–1943).

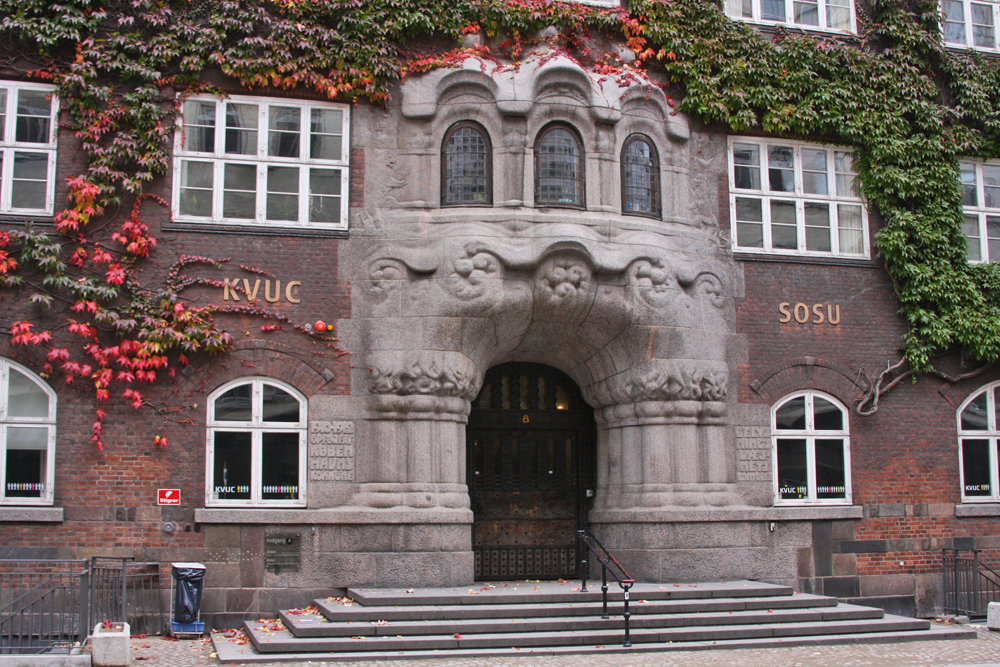
No. 8: The main entrance of the former Københavns Belysningsvæsen headquarters

Københavns VUC (No. 8) is an adult education centre. The National Romantic building is the former headquarters of Københavns Belysningsvæsen. It was built in 1912–13 from a design by Gustav Bartholin Hagen and Rolf Schroeder. The building is constructed in red brick and features two corner risalits with gable motifs with exposed timber framing on the upper parts as well as a central granite portal designed with inspiration from the Coat of Arms of Copenhagen.

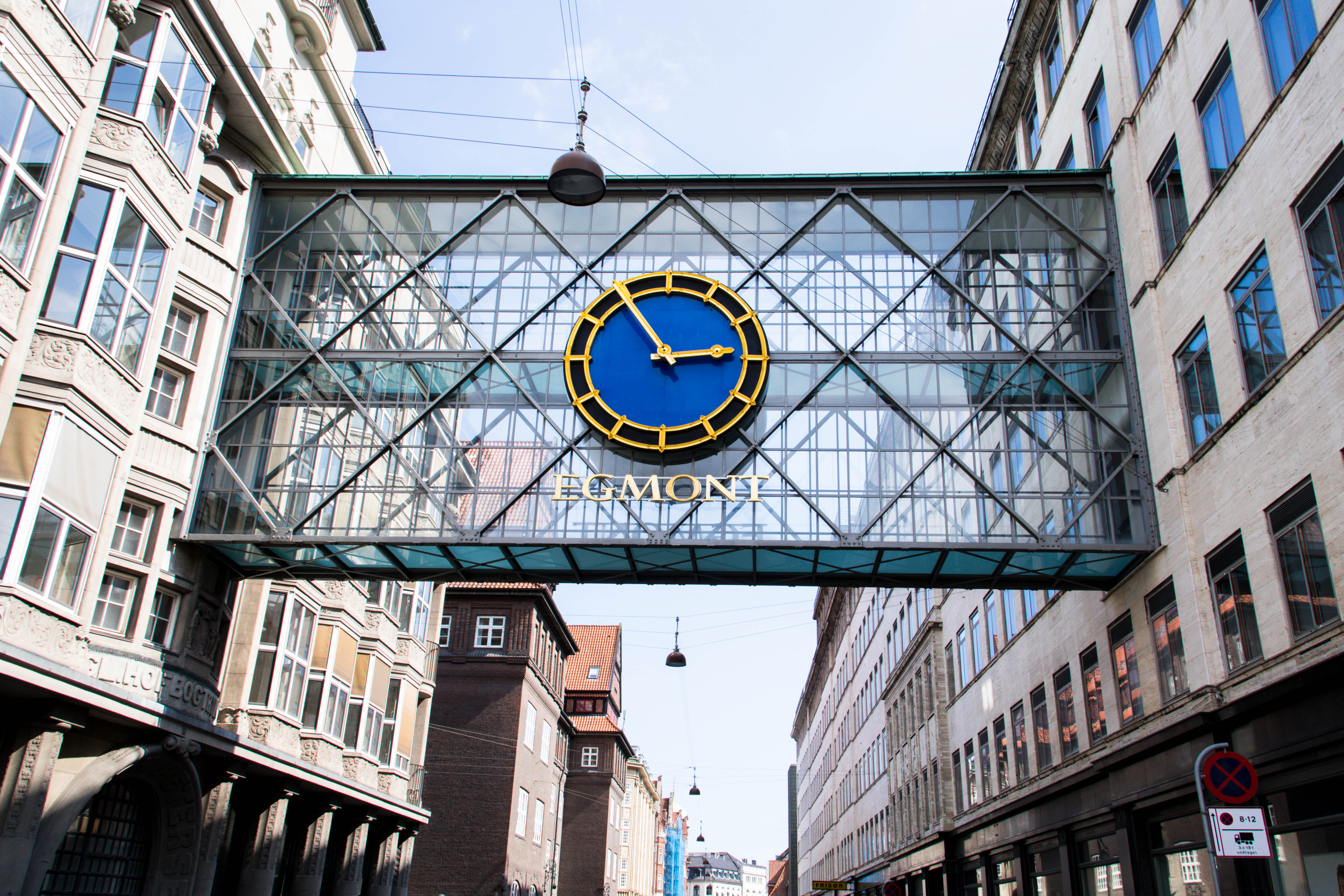
No. 10: The Gutenberghus skyway

The Gutenberghus complez (No. 10 and No. 5-11) is located on both sides of the street. The oldest part of the complex (No. 10) was built in 1911 to design by Bernhard Ingemann (1869–1923) and was later expanded by Alf Cock Clausen. Cock Clausen was also responsible for designing a building on the other side of the street as well as the glazed skyway bridges the street. It features a large clock and the name Egmont in gilded lettering. The Gothersgade Block is now home to the Danish Film Institute. It houses the art cinema Cinemateket as well as a number of other film-related organizations.

== Cultural references ==
Københavns Belysningsvæsen's former building was used as a filming location in the 1977 film Hærværk.
