= DieselHouse =

Technology museum in Copenhagen

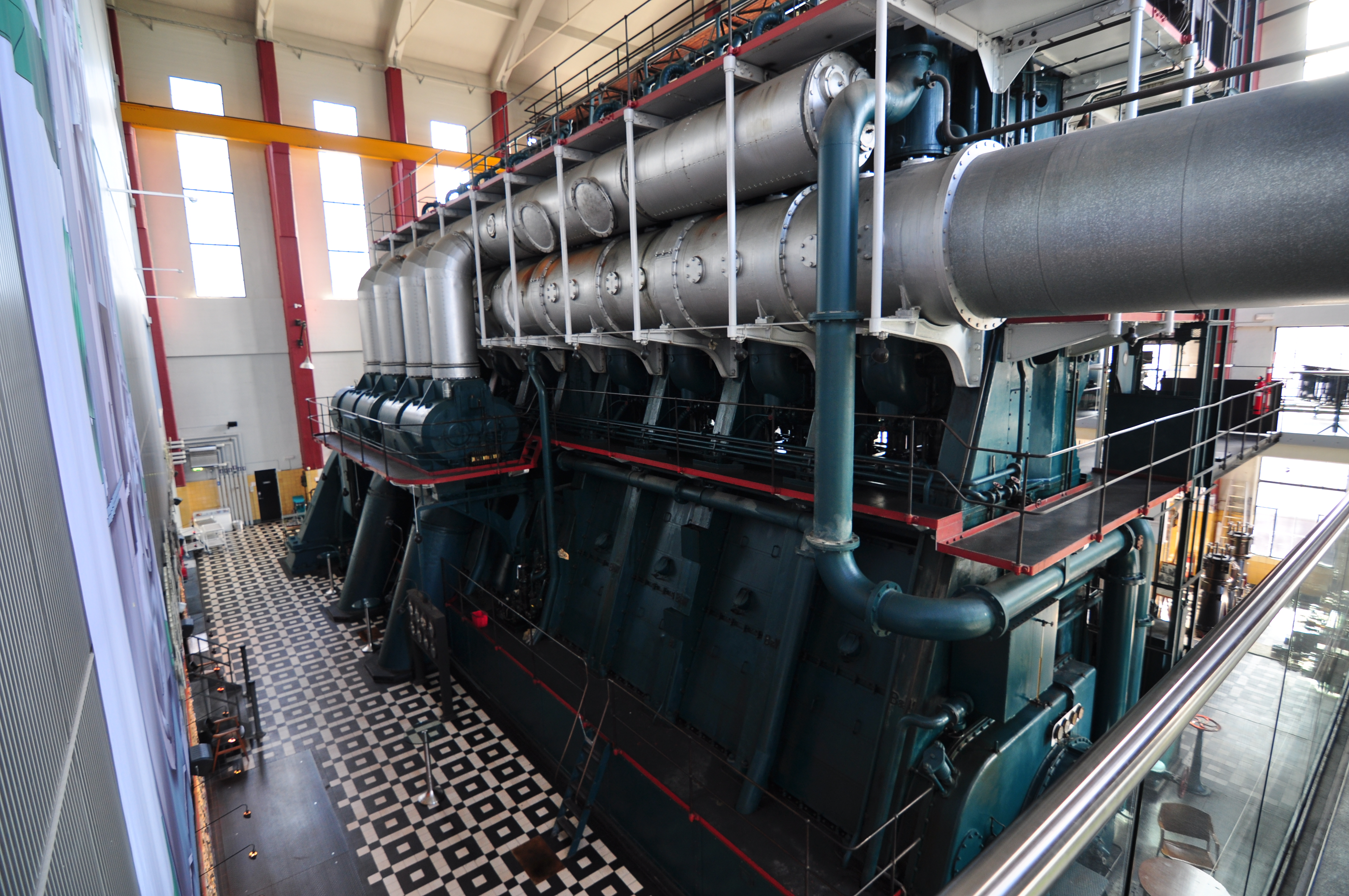

- Location within Denmark
- Established: 2006
- Location: Copenhagen, Denmark
- Coordinates: 55°39′23.14″N 12°33′12.94″E
- Visitors: 12,820 (2014)
- Website: Official website

DieselHouse is an interactive exhibition on diesel technology located on the grounds of the still-operating H. C. Ørsted Power Station in the South Docklands of Copenhagen, Denmark. The exhibition is centred on a large decommissioned Burmeister & Wain diesel engine which was the world's largest for more than 30 years.

== History and premises ==
The result of a collaboration between the Museum of Copenhagen and MAN Diesel, DieselHouse opened in a former machine hall at H. C. Ørsted Power Station in June 2006. The conversion of the building was undertaken by Gottlieb Paludan Architects and has retained the hall's basic structures, while inserting three new storeys with exhibition space and a gallery that flanks the large diesel engine. The exhibition space and gallery have a terse modern design which contrasts with the industrial surroundings.

== Exhibition ==
The exhibition displays several diesel engines of different sizes. The largest of the engines, which was built in 1932 and remained the world's largest for more than 30 years, stands 12.5 meters tall and 24.5 meters wide and weighs 1,400 tons. It produces 22,500 HP and supplied Copenhagen with electricity. It remained in use during peak demand until the 1970s. During World War II a resistance group consisting of workers at the power station used the engine for hiding weapons. It is started up the first and third Sunday every month at 11 am and runs for 5 to 10 minutes. The museum also exhibits Burmeister & Wain's first diesel engine from 1904 with a modest 40 HP and a single cylinder. It is started up every Thursday at 1 pm.

The exhibition also offers a range of interactive activities.
