= SOPU =

- Type: Vocational school
- Administrative staff: c. 400
- Location: Copenhagen, Denmark
- Website: http://sopu.dk/

SOPU, short for Sundhed, Omsorg, Pædagogik, Uddannelse, is a school of secondary education in Copenhagen, Denmark. The school provides vocational training and educational programmes within the health sciences. SOPU is an independent self-owning educational institution under the supervision of the state, managed by a board in conjunction with a principal who manages the day-to-day operations.

== Campuses ==
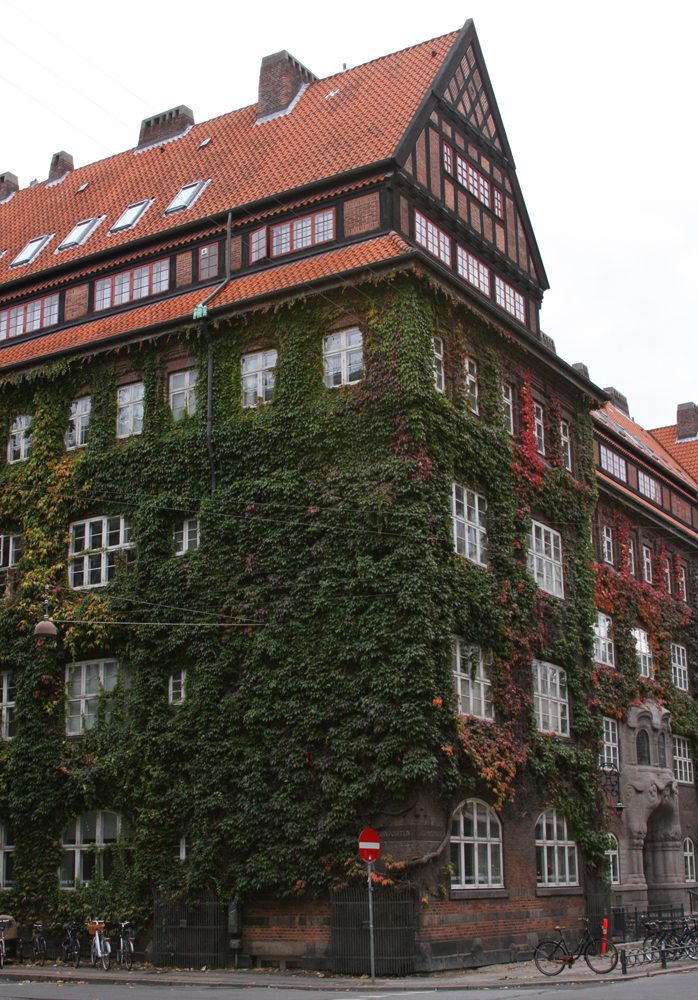
The SOPU campus on Bognmagergade in CopenhagenBuilding

SOPU has two campuses located in Copenhagen and Hillerød. SOPU Copenhagen is currently spread out on three locations in Vognmagergade, Gammel Mønt and Strandlodsvej. The building at Vognmagergade 8 is shared with Københavns BUC. A new campus is under construction on Skælbækgade next to Kødbyen and Dybølsbro station. It is due for completion in February 2015. Its campus in Hillerød is located on Milnersvej.

== Programmes ==
The school offers 3 basic educational programmes within social and health sciences mainly related to municipal job occupations in social health and care facilities and hospitals. The Basic Social and Health programme qualifies participants to work in the municipal social centers that provide care such as cleaning or assisting with bathing for elderly or disabled citizens. The Pedagogy Assistant programme allows participants to work in kindergartens and nurseries, assisting the trained personnel in day-to-day operations. The Basic Porter programme qualifies participants to work in hospitals assisting doctors and nurses transporting patients and equipment around.
