= Københavns Belysningsvæsen =

Coordinates: 55.6828°N 12.5792°E

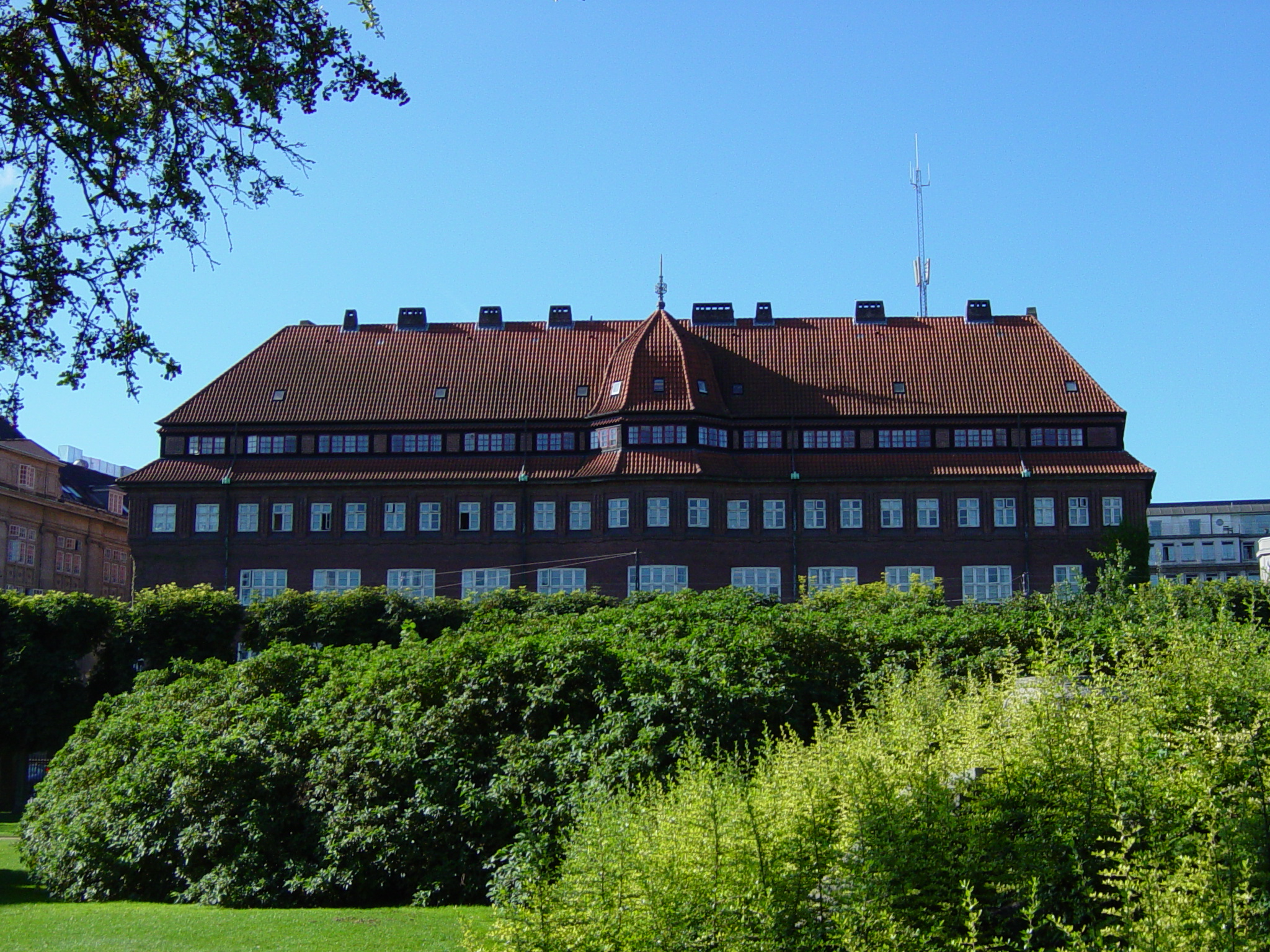
The former headquarters from 1913 seen from Rosenborg Castle Garden

Københavns Belysningsvæsen was a municipally owned company which supplied Copenhagen Tårnby and Dragør municipalities with first gas and later electricity and distant heating, It existed until 2001 when it was merged with Københavns Vand under the name Københavns Energi, a name it had already operated under since 1999.

Its former headquarters is located on Gothersgade in central Copenhagen and now houses Københavns VUC, a school of secondary education.

== History ==
Copenhagen's first gas works, Vestre Gasværk, opened in 1857 roughly where the Meat-Packing District lies today. It was followed by Østre Gasværk in 1878. Initially known as Københavns Gasværker (en. Gasworks of Copenhagen) the company changed its name to Københavns Belysningsvæsen in 1891. Gothergade Power Station, Copenhagen's as well as Denmark's first electricity plant, opened the following year at Gothersgade. Vestre Elbærk opened in 1898, Østre Elbærg in 1903 and H. C. Ørsted Power Station in 1920.

In 1925 part of the production was converted into a combination of electricity and district heating. Svanemølle Power Station was inaugurated in 1953 and Amager Power Station in 1971, both with combined production of electricity and district heating.

In 1999 Københavns Belysningsvæsen changed its name to Københavns Energi and in 2001 it was merged with Copenhagen's local water supply company. In 2005 it was decided to sell the electricity-related activities with effect from 1 May 2006.

== Head office ==
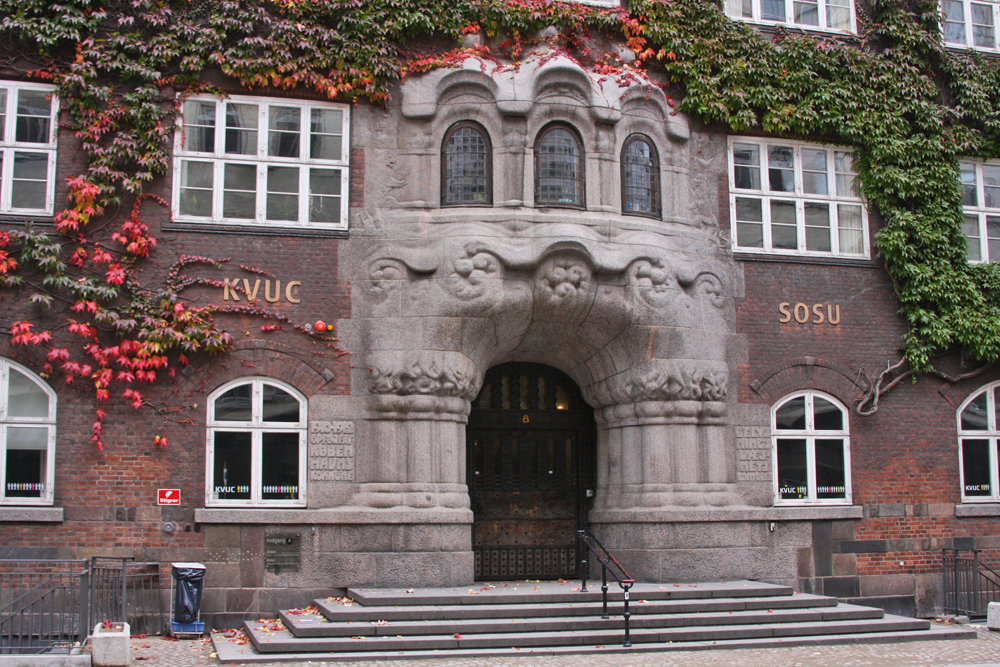
The main entrance towards Vognmagergade

In 1909 the company launched a competition for the design of a new headquarters at Gothersgade. It was won by Gustav Bartholin Hagen. He subsequently made the final design in collaboration with Rolf Schroeder who had taken 3rd prize, and the building was completed in 1913. It is built in Art Nouveau style, in Denmark known as Skønvirke. The portal around the main entrance, which faces Vognmagergade is inspired by the Coat of arms of Copenhagen.

== See also ==
- Turbinehallerne
