= H. C. Ørsted Power Station =

Power station in Copenhagen, Denmark

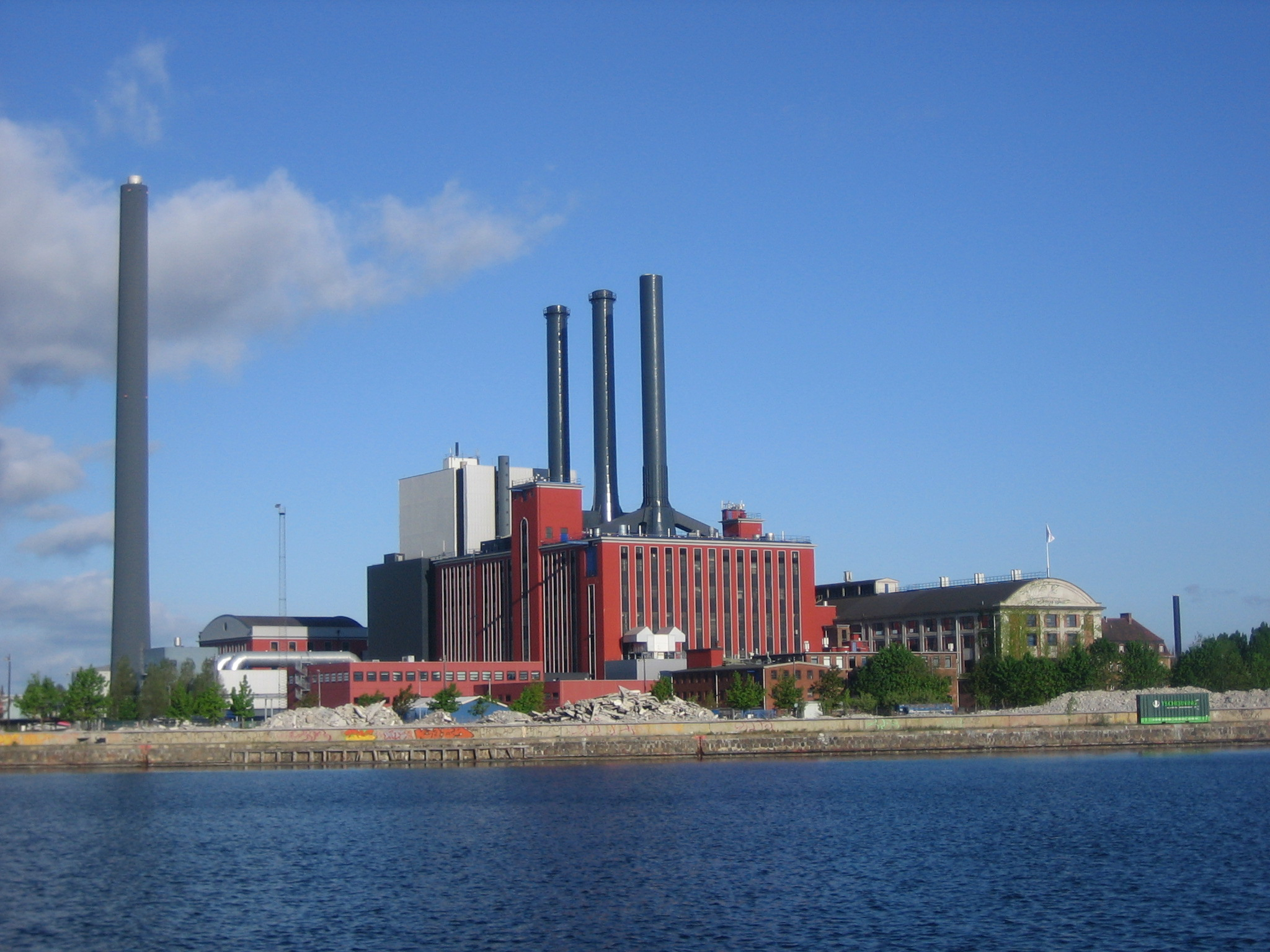
- H. C. Ørsted power station viewed from the water
- Country: Denmark
- Location: Enghave Brygge
- Coordinates: 55°39′24.67″N 12°33′25.07″E
- Status: Operational
- Construction began: 1916
- Commission date: 1920 (1924 and 1930–1932)
- Owners: Københavns Belysningsvæsen (1920-2001); Københavns Energi (2001-2006) [Ørsted A/S]] (2006-present)
- Operator: Ørsted

Thermal power station
- Primary fuel: Coal (1920–1994) natural gas (1994–present)
- Cogeneration?: Yes

Power generation
- Nameplate capacity: 25 MW

External links
- Website: www.orsted.com
- Commons: Related media on Commons

H. C. Ørsted Power Station (Danish: H. C. Ørstedværket) is a natural gas fired combined heat and power station located at Enghave Brygge, Sydhavnen in Copenhagen, Denmark. It is owned and operated by Ørsted.

It is named after the Danish physicist Hans Christian Ørsted, the discoverer of electromagnetism.

== History ==
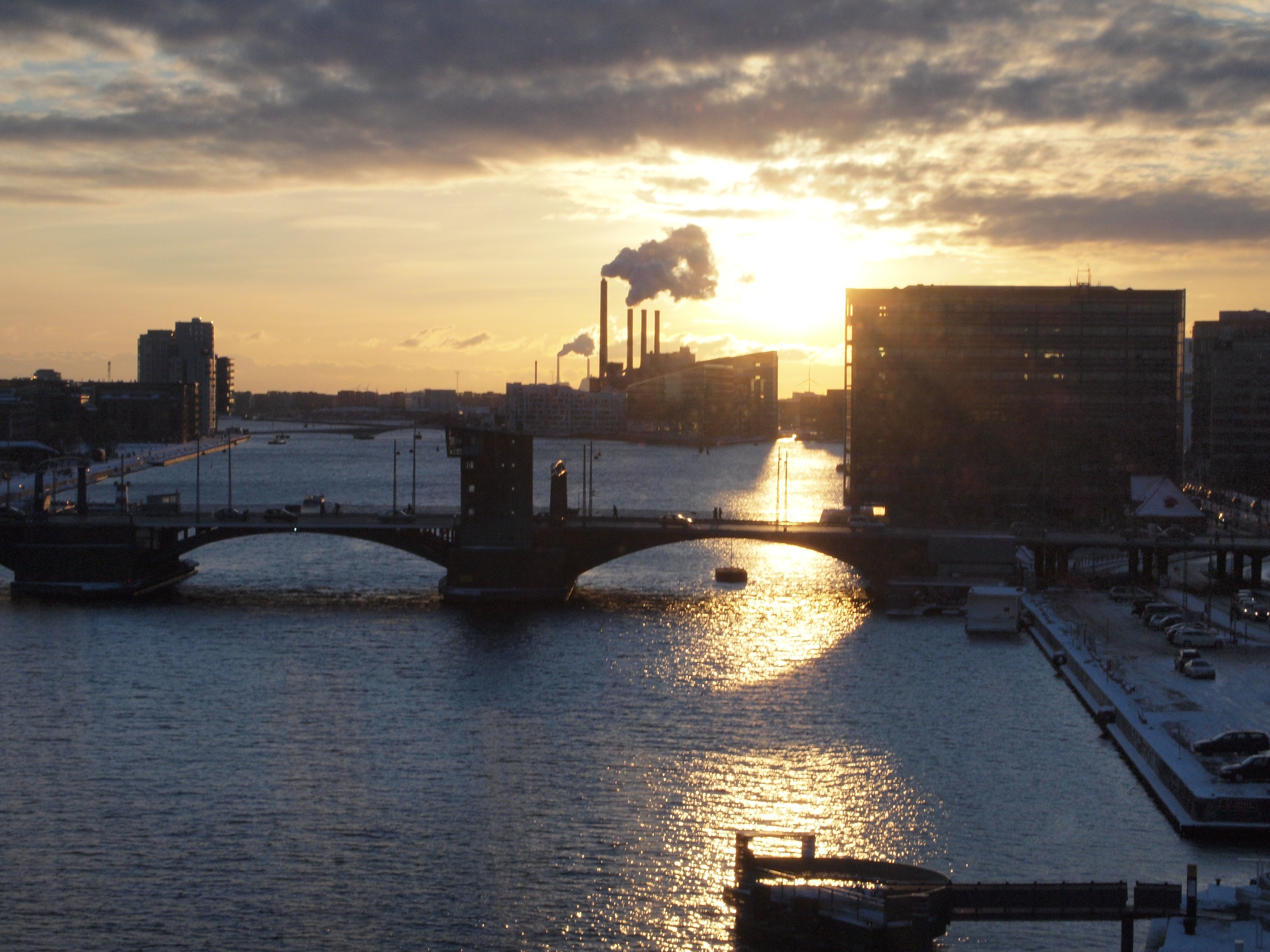
H. C. Ørsted Power Station against the evening sky

Copenhagen's first three power stations, Gothersgade Power Station from 1892 and the Western and Eastern Power Stations from 1898 and 1901, all operated by Københavns Belysningsvæsen, used direct current technology which required a location close to the consumers. The introduction of alternating current technology made it possible to build larger plants at less central locations and H. C. Ørsted Power Station, designed by Andreas Fussing, was built between 1916 and 1920 on Kalvebod Beach to the south of the city. The location by the sea and close to the Southern Harbour provided easy access to cooling water and coal-loading facilities.

On its completion it became the largest power station in Denmark, a position it kept until 1940. It had enough capacity to supply all of the Copenhagen area with lighting, reducing the three existing power stations to back-up systems and transformer stations.

The power station was expanded and adapted in 1924 and again between 1930 and 1932 by Louis Hygom and Valdemar Schmidt. The 1932 expansion saw the installation of a gigantic Burmeister & Wain diesel engine which held the position as the world's largest diesel engine for about 30 years. This engine is still on the grounds operating as an exhibit for DieselHouse, an interactive exhibition museum. It is started up the first and third Sunday every month at 11 am and runs for 5 to 10 minutes.

Coal remained the principal source of fuel until 1994 when it was converted into a natural gas-fired power station.

== Architecture ==
The building is red-washed with tall slender windows and blue chimneys. It has been designated as one of 25 Danish Industrial Heritage Sites by the Danish Heritage Agency.

== Technical description ==
Today the primary task of the power station is to supply district heating to the district-heating network of Greater Copenhagen. Its capacity is 200 MJ/s of heat and 25 MW of electricity supplied from unit 8, which consist of a natural gas fired gas turbine.

== See also ==
- List of power stations in Denmark
