= Sankt Annæ Passage =

Passageway in Copenhagen, Denmark

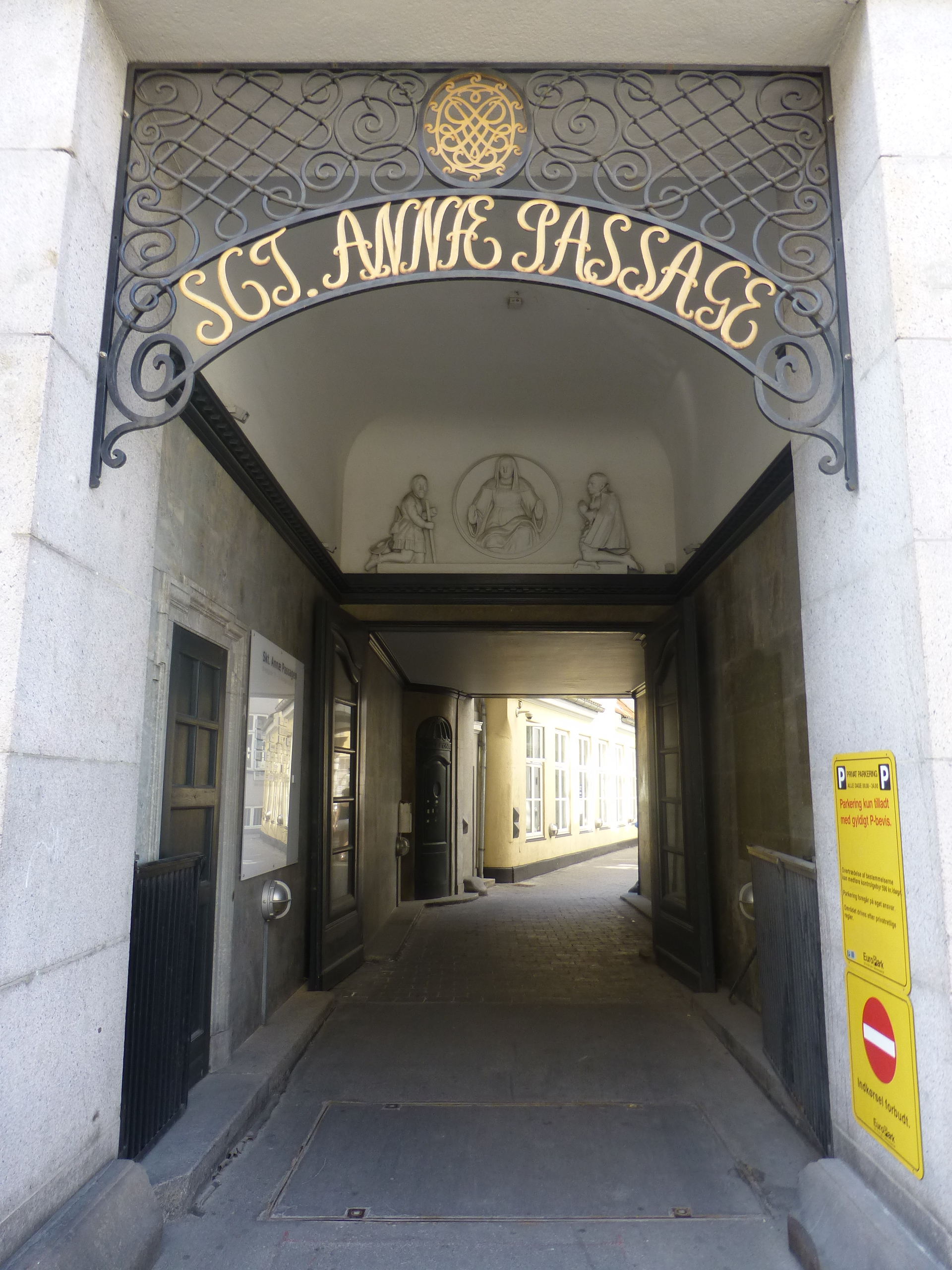
The entrance from Bredgadew

Sankt Annæ Passage (lit. 'St. Ann's Passageway'), situated at Bredgade 26/Store Kongensgade 25, is a passageway and surrounding mixed-use complex linking Bredgade with Store Kongensgade in central Copenhagen, Denmark. The newspaper Dagbladet Information is based in one of the buildings.

== History ==
=== Site history, 1689–1915 ===
The property was listed in Copenhagen's first cadastre from 1689 as No. 133 in St. Ann's East Quarter. It belonged to statholder Gabel's widow at that time. The property was listed in the new cadastre of 1756 as No. 254, owned by etatsråd van Hürch. In the new cadastre of 1806, it was listed as No. 234. It belonged to J. E. Buurmester.

In 1871, No. 235 was expanded with No. 315 (until 1865 part of No. 274, now Dronningens Tværgade 8).

= = =
The building complex was constructed for the businessman Ferdinand Schmahl in 1916–18 to design by architect Niels Banke.

== Commemorative plaques ==
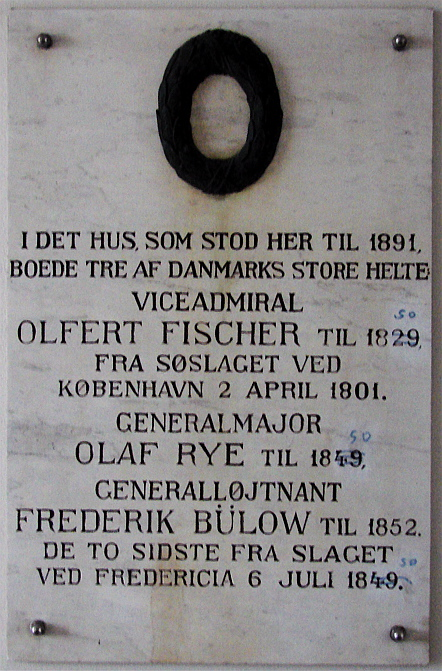
Commemorative plaque for Olfert Fischer, Olaf Rye and Frederik Büllow

Above one of the doors is a plaque that descripes the history of the complex. It mentions when it was built as well as the names of the developer, architect and involved master craftsmen.

Another plaque commemorates that Børge Outze founded the newspaper Dagbladet Information at the site on 4 May 1945. It was installed in 2012 to mark the 100 years' anniversary of his birth.

A third plaque commemorates that Vice Admiral Olfert Fischer (until 1829), Major-General Olaf Rye (until 1849) and Lieutenant-General Frederik Büllow all lived in the building that stood at the site until 1892. Fischer commanded the Danish fleet in the Battle of Copenhagen on 2 April 1801 while the two others participated in the Battle of Fredericia on 6 July 1849.
