= Fritz Koch =

Austrian former ski jumper (born 1956)

Personal information
- Full name: Fritz Koch
- Born: 12 March 1956 (age 70) Villach, Austria

Sport
- Sport: Skiing

World Cup career
- Seasons: 1980–1981
- Indiv. podiums: 1
- Updated on 30 Mar 2015

Fritz Koch (born 12 March 1956) is an Austrian former ski jumper. He competed in the Nordic combined event at the 1976 Winter Olympics.
