= Statue of Asmus Jacob Carstens =

Statue in Copenhagen, Denmark

Coordinates: 55°40′20″N 12°34′22″E

Asmus Jacob Carstens
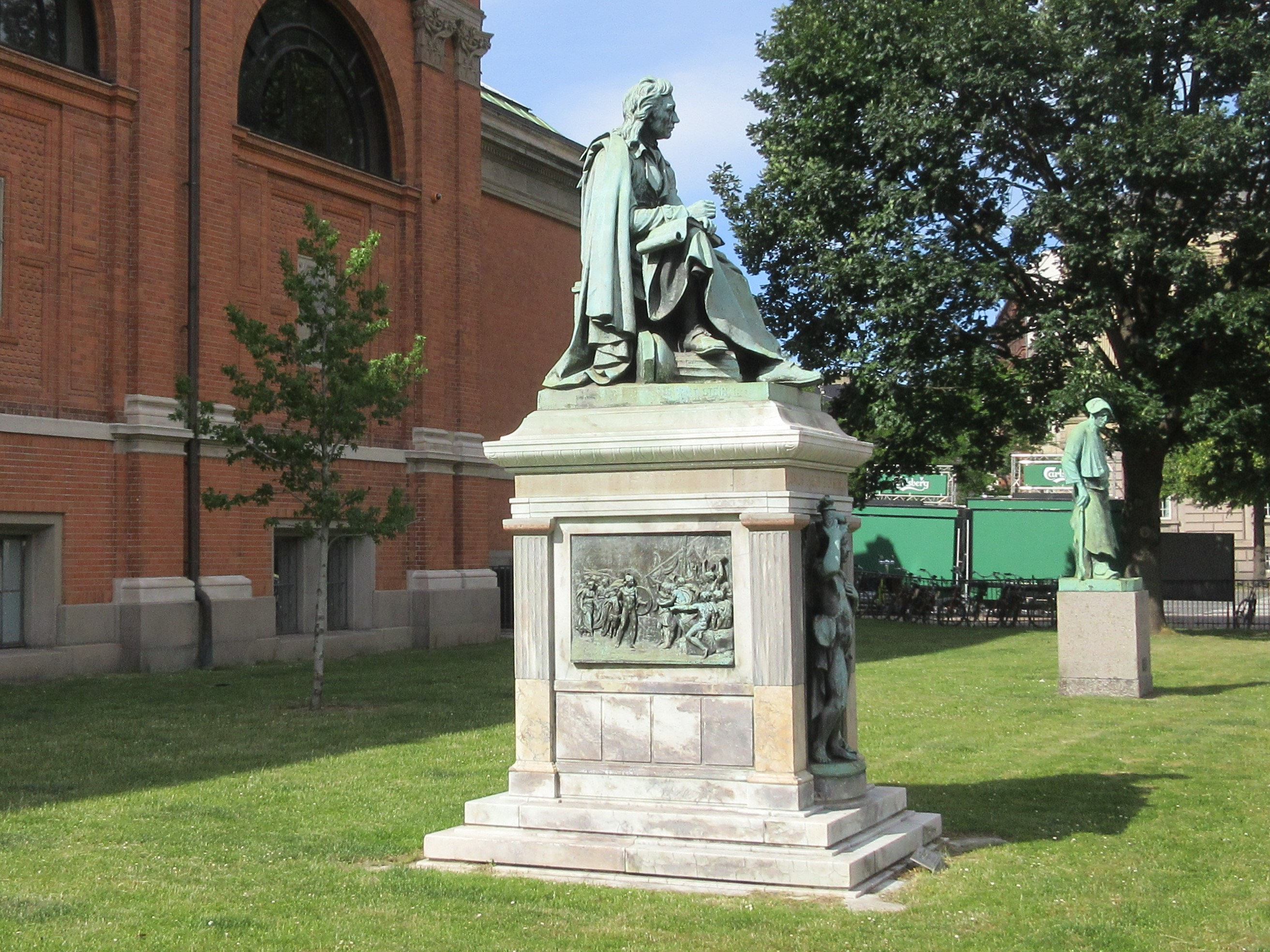
- The monument in July 2022
- Interactive map of Asmus Jacob Carstens
- Location: Copenhagen, Denmark
- Designer: Theobald Stein
- Type: Statue
- Material: Bronze
- Completion date: 1880
- Opening date: 1894

The Statue of Asmus Jacob Carstens is a statue of German-Danish painter Asmus Jacob Carstens situated in the garden of the Ny Carlsberg Glyptotek, facing Niels Brocks Gade, in Copenhagen, Denmark. It was created by Theobald Stein in 1878–1879 and moved to its current location in 1894. It is complemented by a statue of Georg Zoëga facing Tietgensgade on the other side of the museum. The monument is flanked by two other bronze statues, Jules Dalou's Field Worker (1893) and Constantin Meunier's The Hammerman.

== Description ==
The monument consists of a bronze statue of Carstens mounted on a tall marble plinth. The bronze statue depicts Carstens sitting on an antique base in an everyday work situation. He is holding his pencil and sketch pad. On the rear side of the antique base is a relief of Romulus and Remus with the Capitoline Wolf and above them the inscription "S.P.Q.R.". On the left side of the base is a relief of a laurel wreath. On its right side is a relief of a sitting sphinx. On the front side of the plinth is a relief of the winged genius of painting wearing a Phrygian cap and with a raised torch. At his feet on the right is a palette, brushes and laurels. On the two sides are two square bronze reliefs based on Carstens's original drawings of "Jason and the Golden Fleece" (left) and "Night with her children Sleep and Death." (right). On the rear side of the plinth is a square bronze plate with an inscription in relief lettering:

ASMUS IAKOB
CARSTENS
født i st. jørgen ved
slesvig
10 mai 1754
død i rom 25 mai 1798
skiænket staden kiøbenhavn
af brygger carl iacobsen
mdccclxxx

== History ==
Born in Schleswig, Carstens attended the Royal Danish Academy of Fine Arts before settling in Rome. He championed the Neoclassical style among the city's German and Scandinavian expat artists and was thus an important source of influence for a young Bertel Thorvaldsen. The monument was commissioned from Theobald Stein by Carl Jacobsen at his own initiative. Jacobsen's interest in Carstens was prompted by a German edition of Carstens' engravings published between 1869 and 1884. In a letter to Jacobsen dated 30 December 1878, Stein commented on the progress of his work:

Dear Mr. Jacobsen,

My little boy has measles, so I have unfortunately neither been able to greet you and your wife nor parents this Christmas. Yesterday, however, he was up a bit again, and I suppose the quarantine is over again soon. I'm looking forward to show you Carstens, who will be done in 14 days. Many artists have already seen it, including my friend Bloch, and I am fairly confident about the result. In 14 days I will then start on the bas-reliefs, all at once.- Now that the old year is coming to an end, I send you, dear friend, a heartfelt thank you for all your great kindness and trust, whereby this year has become so important to me. May all good luck and happiness follow you and all of you in the coming year it desires

Your always devoted

Th. Stein

The bronze statue and reliefs were cast by Fonderie Thiébaut Frères in Paris in 1880. Jacobsen offered the monument to the Copenhagen City Council on condition that it would be placed on the lawn in front of Thorvaldsens Museum. The proposal received hefty criticism from many sides, even from J. N. Madvig, who had recently assumed the position as president of the Carlsberg Foundation. In an article in Fædrelandet, he did not just oppose the location but the mere idea of erecting a monument to an artist, arguing that such statues should be reserved for royalty, military leaders and literary figures. It did not help that Ferdinand Meldahl pointed out that there were plenty of examples of monuments honouring artists abroad.

Jacobsen ended up installing the completed monument in the courtyard in front of his home in Valby. The monument was later moved to the central reservation of Vestre Boulevard in conjunction with the opening of the new Ny Carlsberg Glyptotek. It was later moved to its current location in the museum garden, facing Niels Brocks Gade.

In 1910, Jacobsen commissioned a statue of Danish archeologist Georg Zoëga, which was installed on the other side of the museum.

== Other versions ==
A preliminary model from 1879 is in collection of the Funen Art Museum. Another model in burnt clay (1879, height: 52 cm (20 in)) is in the collection of the Ny Carlsberg Glyptotek (Inv.no. 432).

== Gallery ==
Relief on the front side of the plinth

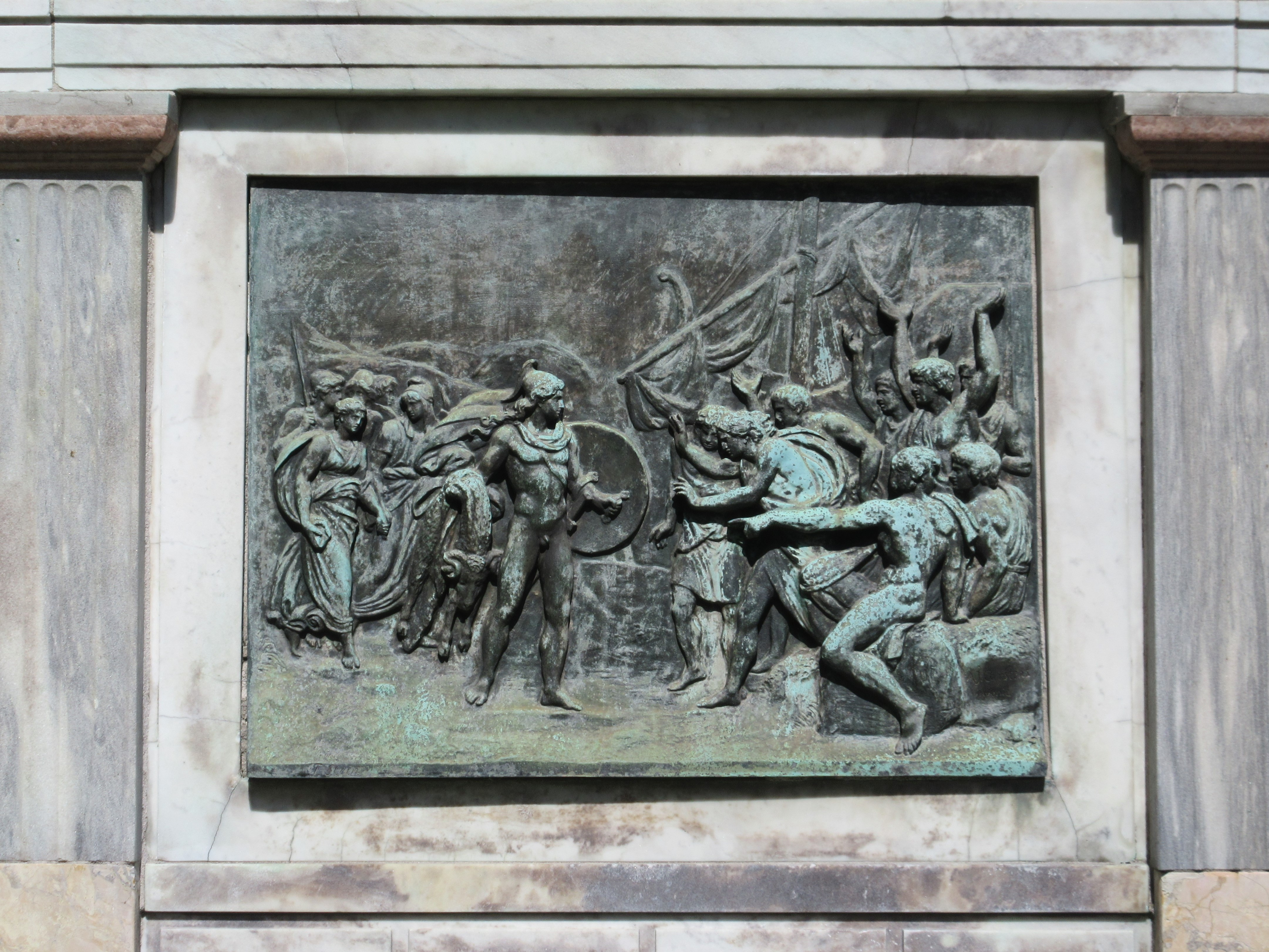
The relief on one side of the plinth

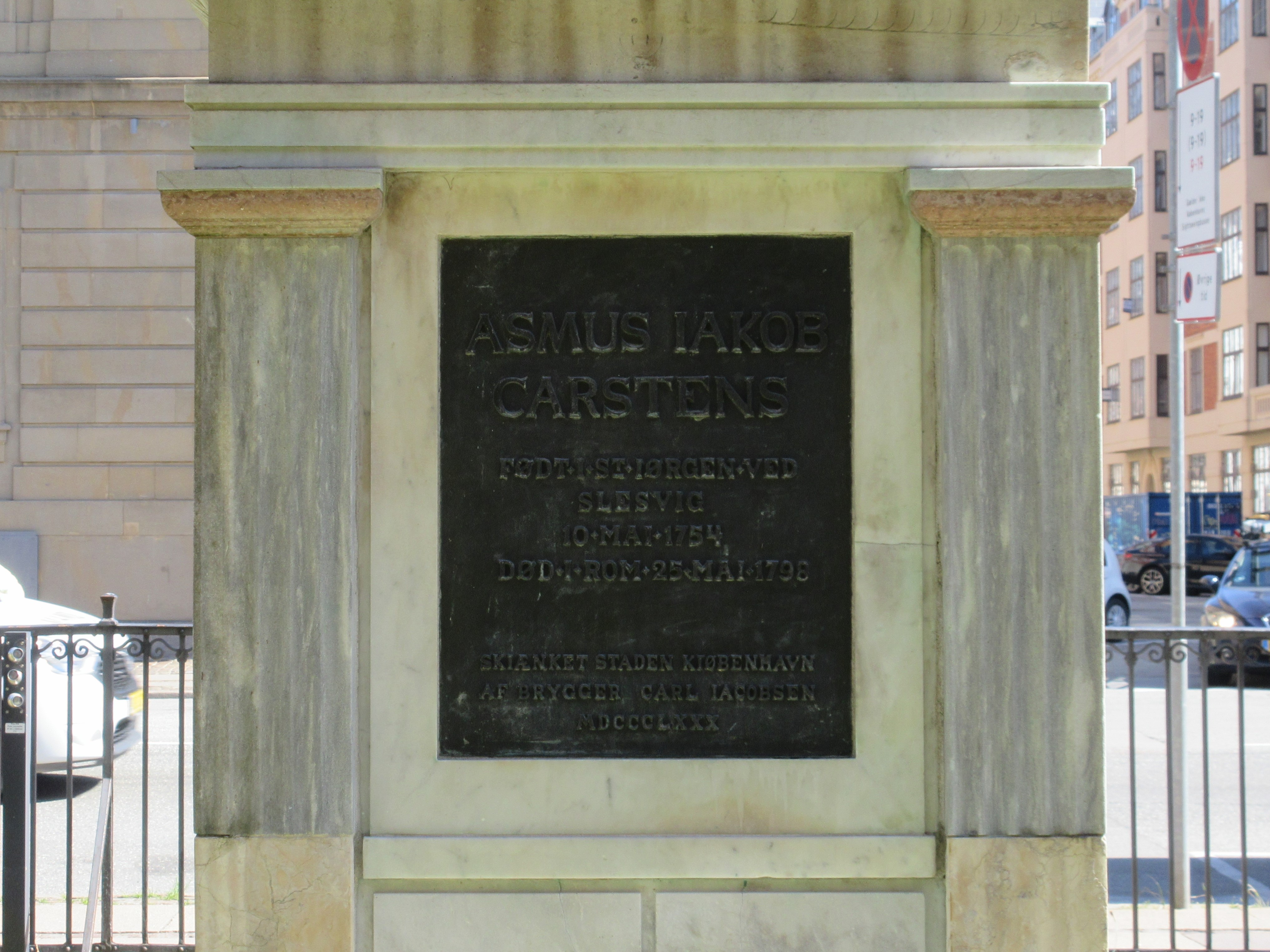
Inscription
