= Equestrian statue of Christian IX, Esbjerg =

Statue in Denmark

Coordinates: 55°27′59″N 8°27′08″E

- Interactive map of Equestrian statue of Christian IX, Esbjerg
- Designer: Ludvig Brandstrup
- Type: Sculpture
- Completion date: 1899

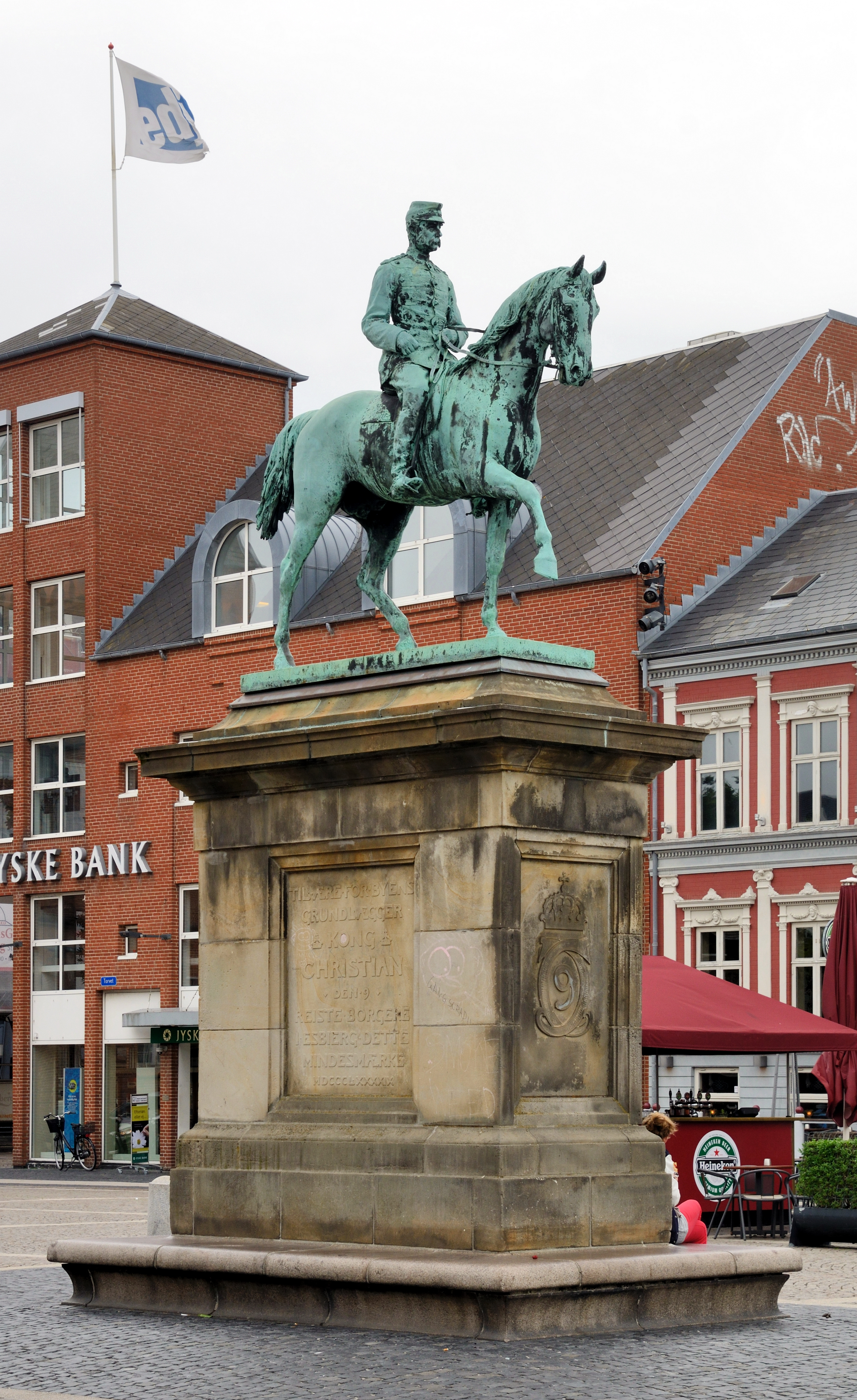
Christian IX statue, Esbjerg (1899)

An equestrian statue of Christian IX stands on the market place in the centre of Esbjerg, Denmark. Designed in bronze by Ludvig Brandstrup, it was completed in 1899.

== Background ==
After the port of Altona had been lost to the Germans in the Second Schleswig War in 1864, King Christian IX signed a bill from the Danish Parliament in 1868 for the establishment of a harbour in Esbjerg, thus being recognized as Esbjerg's founder. The statue was commissioned by the city's citizens when the town was raised to the status of a municipal borough in 1899 but the base stood empty until the following year as the result of a strike.

== Statue ==
Seated on his horse with one of its hoofs raised, Christian IX is positioned gazing over the harbour from the centre of the square. The bronze statue was created by Ludvig Brandstrup (1861–1935) who designed a similar work which stands in Slagelse.

The base of the statue carries the inscription: Til Aere for Byens Grundlaegger rejste Borgere i Esbjerg dette Mindesmaerke (In Honour of the founder of the town, the citizens of Esbjerg raised this monument). It also bears the Danish coat of arms with the king's motto Med Gud for ære og ret (With God for honour and justice).
