= Friedrich Gottlieb Welcker =

German classical philologist and archaeologist (1784–1868)

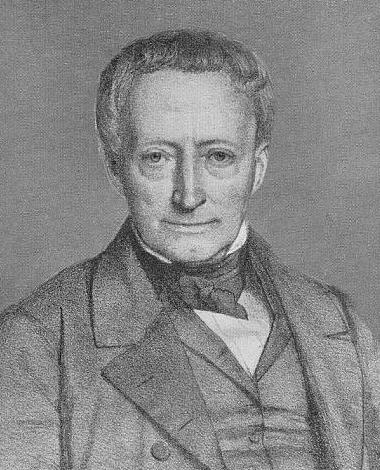
- Born: 4 November 1784; Grünberg, Hesse-Darmstadt, Holy Roman Empire
- Died: 17 December 1868 (aged 84); Bonn, Kingdom of Prussia

Academic background
- Education: University of Giessen

Academic work
- Discipline: Classical philology, archaeology
- Institutions: University of Giessen; University of Göttingen; University of Bonn

Friedrich Gottlieb Welcker (4 November 1784 – 17 December 1868) was a German classical philologist and archaeologist.

== Biography ==
Welcker was born at Grünberg, Hesse-Darmstadt. Having studied classical philology at the University of Giessen, in 1803 he was appointed master in the high school, an office which he combined with that of lecturer at the university. In 1806 he journeyed to Italy, and was for more than a year private tutor at Rome in the family of Wilhelm von Humboldt, who became his friend and correspondent.

Welcker returned to Giessen in 1808, and resuming his school-teaching and university lectures was in the following year appointed the first professor of Greek literature and archaeology at that or any German university. After serving as a volunteer in the campaign of 1814 he went to Copenhagen to edit the posthumous papers of the Danish archaeologist Georg Zoega (1755–1809), and published his biography, Zoegas Leben (Stuttgart, 1819).

His liberalism in politics having brought him into conflict with the university authorities of Giessen, he exchanged that university for Göttingen in 1816, and three years later received a chair at the new University of Bonn, where he established the art museum and the library, of which he became the first librarian.

In 1841–1843 he travelled in Greece and Italy (cf. his Tagebuch, Berlin, 1865), retired from the librarianship in 1854, and in 1861 from his professorship, but continued to reside at Bonn until his death.

== Work ==
Welcker was a pioneer in the field of archaeology, and was one of the first to insist, like August Böckh and his pupil Karl Otfried Müller, on the necessity of co-ordinating the study of Greek art and religion with philology, in opposition to the methods of the older Hellenists, like Gottfried Hermann, which they perceived as too narrow. The later workers took as their aim the complete reconstruction of the ancient life, in contrast with members of the school of Hermann, who were disposed to limit the field to the language and text of the Greek and Roman writers. Welcker was thoroughly imbued with the harmony of the whole Greek conception, whether expressed in art, literature, or religion, and it was to the presentation of this as a complete whole that he devoted his efforts.

Besides early work on Aristophanes, Pindar, and Sappho, whose character he vindicated, he edited Alcman (1815), Hipponax (1817), Theognis (1826) and the Theogony of Hesiod (1865), and published a Sylloge epigrammatum Graecorum (Bonn, 1828). His Griechische Götterlehre (3 vols., Göttingen, 1857–1862) may be regarded as the first scientific treatise on Greek religion. Among his works on Greek literature the chief are Die Äschyleische Trilogie (1824, 6), Der epische Zyklus oder die Homerischen Geschichte (2 vols. 1835, 49), Die griechischen Tragödien mit Rücksicht auf den epischen Zyklus geordnet (3 vols., 1839–1841). His editions and biography of Zoega, his Zeitschrift für Geschichte und Auslegung der alten Kunst (Göttingen, 1817, 8) and his Alte Denkmäler (5 vols., 1849–1864) contain his views on ancient art.
