= Statue of Georg Zoëga =

Statue in Copenhagen, Denmark

Georg Zoëga
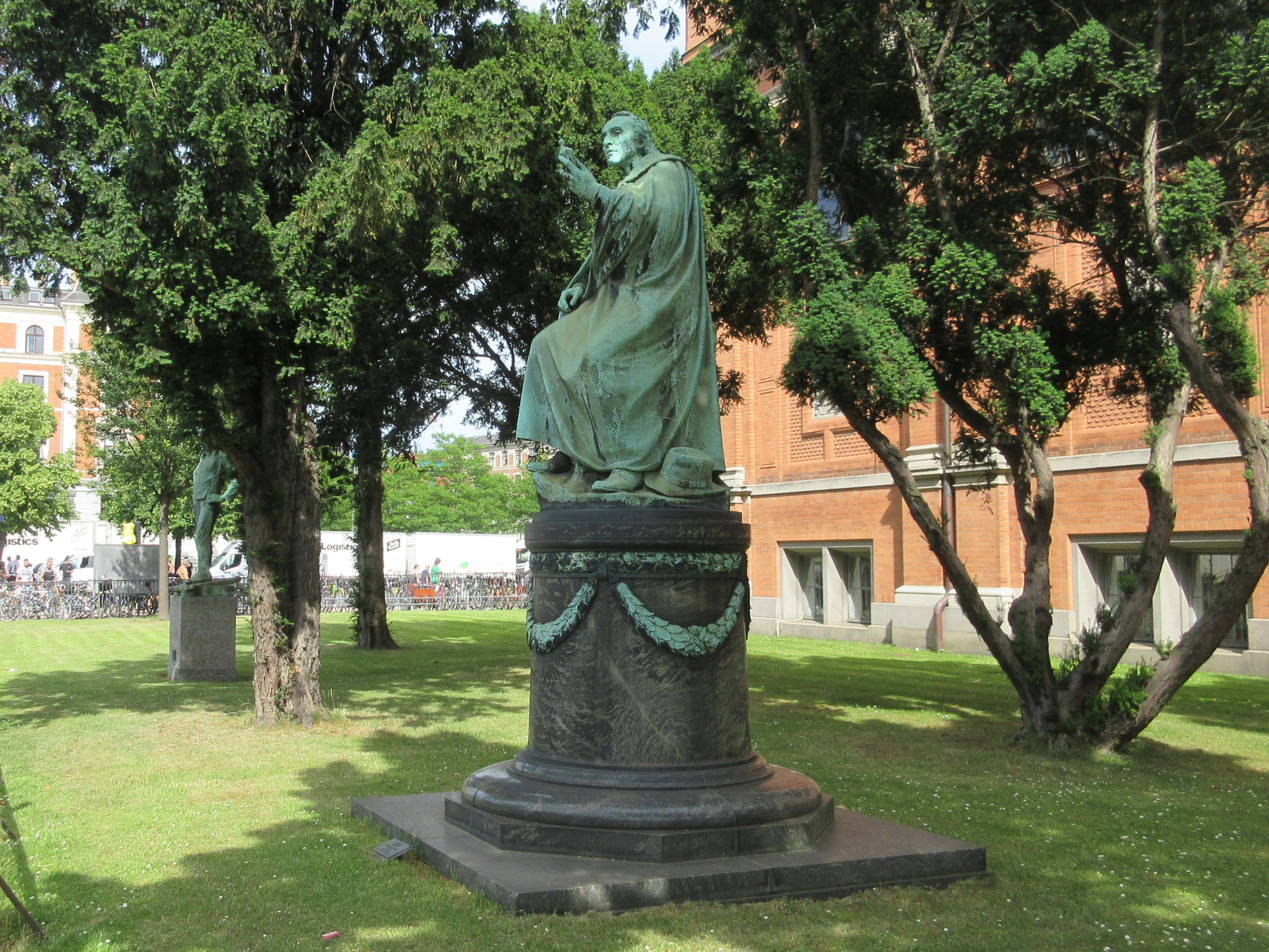
- Artist: Ludvig Brandstrup
- Year: 1911
- Medium: Bronze
- Subject: Georg Zoëga
- Location: Copenhagen

The Statue of Georg Zoëga is a statue of the Danish archeologist Georg Zoëga located in the garden of the Ny Carlsberg Glyptotek, facing Tietgensgade, in Copenhagen, Denmark. It was created by Ludvig Brandstrup and unveiled in 1911.

== Description ==
The monument consists of a bronze sculpture standing on a granite plinth and measures 380 cm × 230 cm × 230 cm (12.5 ft × 7.5 ft × 7.5 ft). Zoëga is depicted sitting on a chair and studying a diminutive version of a Greek statue of a woman which he holds in his left hand. He wear a cape, which, much like a Roman toga, is swept around his raised arm. The oval granite plinth is decorated with bronze festoons.

== History ==
A model of the statue was commissioned by Carl Jacobsen in 1908 to mark the 100th anniversary of Zoëga's death the following year. He confirmed the commission in a letter dated 25 October 1908.

Dear Mr. Brandstrup,

As a confirmation of our conversation yesterday, I hereby request you to create a model of a Zoëga Statue. The figure has to be seated and will be installed as a match of the Carstens Statue outside the Glyptoteque, turning its back at Langebro. Due to the light, the head must under no circumstances look right but either straight or to the left. The price of the model is DKK 500.

Yours sincerely

Carl Jacobsen

The model has to be completed no later than 1 February 1909. This is a condition sine qua non!

The mentioned "Carstens statue" is Theobald Stein's statue of Asmus Jacob Carstens on the other side of the building (facing Niels Brocks Gade). The Zoëga statue was cast in bronze in Lauritz Rasmussen's Bronze Foundry. The monument was unveiled in 1911.

== Other versions ==
A figurine in burnt clay from 1909 is owned by the Ny Carlsberg Glyptotek (Inv.no. 1735). Another 32,-cm high figurine in unburnt clay is owned by the Hirschsprung Collection.
