= Stefano Borgia =

Catholic cardinal (1731 – 1804)

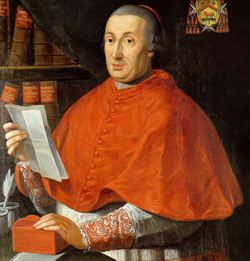
Stefano Borgia.

Stefano Borgia (3 December 1731 - 23 November 1804) was an Italian Cardinal, theologian, antiquarian, and historian.

== Life ==
Cardinal Borgia belonged to a well-known family of Velletri, where he was born, and was a member of the collateral branch of House of Borgia of Velletri. His early education was controlled by his uncle Alessandro (1682–1764), Archbishop of Fermo. From his youth, Stefano Borgia manifested an aptitude for historical research and a taste for relics of ancient civilizations, a line in which he succeeded so well that, at the age of nineteen, he was received into the Academy of Cortona.

He founded a museum in Velletri, in which, during his whole life, he gathered coins and manuscripts, especially Coptic, and which may be considered his major undertaking and achievement. Such was his passion for antiquities that he is known to have sold his jewels and precious earthenware in order to secure the coveted treasures and have the description of them printed. Borgia placed his scientific collection at the disposal of scholars, regardless of creed and country, and gave them encouragement and support. Paolino da San Bartolomeo, Adler, Zoëga, Heeren, and many others were among his enthusiastic friends.

Borgia was not left entirely to his chosen field of activity, and was called to fill several important political positions. "He was admitted on all hands to be facile Princeps of the Sacred College." Benedict XIV appointed him Governor of Benevento. In 1770 he was made secretary of the Congregation de Propaganda Fide, an office of which he took advantage to acquire antiquities by the help of the missionaries—a help which proved always forthcoming.

He was made a cardinal in 1789. In the period of the French invasion, Borgia was given charge of Rome by Pius VI (1797–98). After the proclamation of the Republic, he was arrested (1798), but quickly released, whereupon he immediately resumed his studies and work of collecting; soon afterwards he joined Pius VI in Valence, Drôme, and endeavoured to have this pontiff send to Asia and Africa a body of missionaries who would preach the Gospel and gather various monuments.

Cardinal Borgia was a participant in the Papal conclave, 1800, which elected Pope Pius VII. Borgia helped him in the reorganization of the Papal States. In 1801 he was made Rector of the Collegium Romanum, and he was in the retinue of Pius VII when this pontiff went to France to crown the new emperor Napoleon. Having arrived in Lyons, Cardinal Borgia was taken ill and died. After his death his collection of Coptic manuscripts was divided: the non-Biblical manuscripts were taken to Naples and placed in the Biblioteca Borbonica, now the Biblioteca nazionale Vittorio Emanuele III; and the Biblical manuscripts, except for a few which were taken to Naples by mistake, given to the Congregation de Propaganda Fide, together with the collection of coins and monuments forming the Museo Borgiano.

At the half of the 19th century, the manuscripts of the Museo Borgiano were transferred to the Vatican Library, where they are found today. Before the partition of the manuscripts was made the scholar and convert, Georg Zoëga, wrote a complete and accurate description of them in his posthumous work Catologus Codicum Copticorum manuscriptorum qui in Museo Borgiano Velitris adservantur (Rome, 1810). Borgia also published several works bearing especially on historical topics.

The museum of Stefano Borgia in Velletri was also famous for the Charta Borgiana which begins Papyrology in the west and the Codex Borgia, discovered by Alexander von Humboldt, is named after him.

== Publications ==
- Esposizione del Monumento di Papa Giovanni XVI (Roma, 1750).
- Interpretazione di un' antica Inscrizione scoperta in Malta (Roma: Pagliani, 1751).
- Istoria della Citta di Tadino nell' Umbria, e relazione delle sue rovine (Roma, 1751).
- Illustrazione su di un antica Inscrizione della Citta di Cupra Montana, contro l'opinione del P.D. Mauro Sarti Camaldolese (Pesaro, 1752; Modena, 1756).
- Apologia del Pontificato di Benedetto X 1752 (Modena, 1756).
- Oratio hab. cor. Bened. XIV P. M. in die Ascension Dom. 1757 (Roma, 1757).
- Meorie Istoriche della Pontificia Citta di Benevento dal secolo VIII al secolo XVIII (Roma: Salomoni, 1763–69).
- Opusculum Augustinei Card. Valerii de Benedictione Agnorum Dei (Roma, 1775).
- Vaticana confessio B. Petri chronoligcis testimoniis illustrata (Roma, 1776).
- De Cruce Vaticana ex dono Iustini Augusti (Roma, 1779).
- De Cruce Veliterna Commentarius (Roma, 1780).
- Breve istoria del dominio temporale della S. Sede Apostolica sulle Due Sicilie (Roma, 1788).
- Defesa del dominio temporale della S. Sede Apostolica in Sicilia (Roma, 1791).

== See also ==
- Borgia map
- Old Testament fragment (Naples, Biblioteca Vittorio Emanuele III, I B 18)

== Bibliography ==
- cites:
  - Paolino da San Bartolomeo, Vitae Synopsis Steph. Borgiae (Rome, 1805)
