= Charta Borgiana =

2nd-century manuscript

- National Archaeological Museum, Naples (inventory numbers 2318 to 2320); Library of the Lisbon Academy of Sciences (Ms. A[zul] 1725)
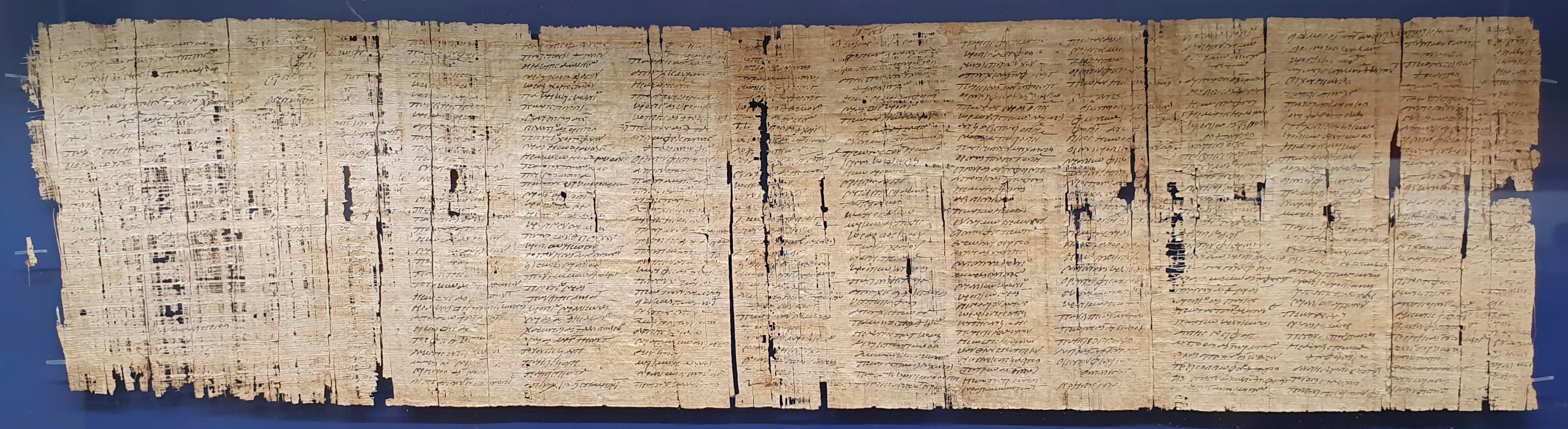
- The papyrus roll in the National Archaeological Museum (inventory number 2318)
- Type: documentary papyrus
- Date: After 17 September 193
- Material: papyrus
- Size: 875 by 220 millimetres (34.4 in × 8.7 in) (roll, inventory number 2318)

The Charta Borgiana or Schow papyrus (SB I 5124) is a 2nd-century papyrus manuscript in Koine Greek, which is now part of the collection of the National Archaeological Museum, Naples (inventory numbers 2318 to 2320), with an additional fragment in the library of the Lisbon Academy of Sciences (Ms. A[zul] 1725). It consists of one papyrus roll and 23 individual fragments.

The papyrus is named after Stefano Borgia (1731–1804), the later cardinal, to whom the manuscript was gifted. It contains several lists of persons who discharged the dyke work owed by the village of Tebtynis in 193 working on canals at Ptolemais Hormou (El Lahun). The first and longest of its lists names 181 men.

Despite its commonplace content, it is well-known because its publication in 1788 by the Danish philologist Niels Iversen Schow was the first publication of a Greek papyrus and marked the beginning of papyrology.

== Collection and description ==
The main parts of the Charta Borgiana were initially housed at the museum of Stefano Borgia in Velitri, Italy (the Museo di Velletri) under the inventory number 623, but later became part of the collection of the National Archaeological Museum, Naples under inventory numbers 2318 to 2320. One additional fragment is now part of the Library of the Lisbon Academy of Sciences (Ms. A[zul] 1725).

The Naples parts consist of a roll with 12.5 columns differing in width with 30–34 lines each (inventory number 2318, formerly Inv. Ard. 77). It measures 875 by 220 millimetres (34.4 in × 8.7 in). Additionally, 22 individual fragments of the manuscript are also part of the Naples' collection, 13 fragments under the inventory number 2319 (formerly Inv. Ard. 66) and 9 fragments under inventory number 2320 (formerly Inv. Ard. 67).

The additional Lisbon fragment joins at the top left of the first Naples fragment, together they now have three columns of text and are published as SB XXX 17292.

According to the Duke Databank of Documentary Papyri (DDbDP) the roll and its 23 fragments (or 22 if the first Naples fragment and the Lisbon fragment are counted as one) have 687 lines of text.

== History ==
=== Naples manuscript ===
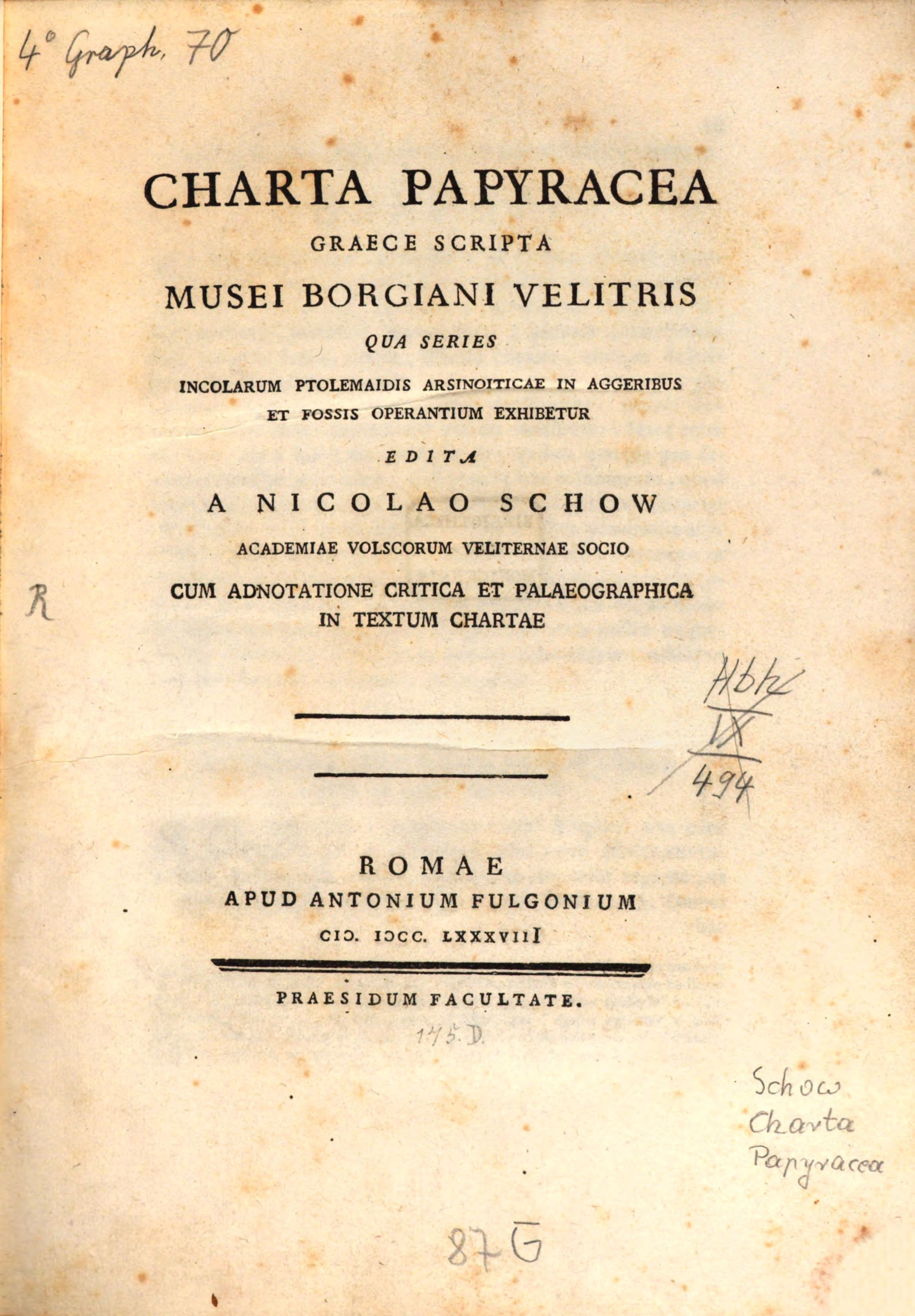
1788 edition of the papyrus

In 1788, the Danish philologist Niels Iversen Schow (1754–1830), who later published the papyrus, wrote a colorful description about the discovery of the papyrus in 1778 in Latin. In an English translation it reads:

The papyrus of the Borgian Museum was discovered, along with forty or fifty others, in the year 1778 in a subterranean location in the city of Giza [...]. All these papyri (however they may have been rolled, I do not know) were kept in a box of sycamore wood and were being offered to a dealer for a very small price: This man, however, ignorant of the supreme value and worth of these things, took care to send one only, which is ours, for the sake of novelty, to the Most Eminent Prelate Stephen Borgia: the Turks tore up the rest, and delighted themselves with their smoke (for they say the smell of smoke is aromatic). Behold the miserable fate of these remarkable monuments [...]: Let us, however, rejoice in the more favourable fortune of our own times, and console ourselves for this sad loss with the hope that, perhaps under better auspices, more monuments of the same kind may one day be discovered.

— Schow, 1788

The history of the manuscript's discovery, as related by Schow, is contested; it has e.g. been noted that burned papyri smell just like burnt paper and have no special odor. It is, however, certain that the sole manuscript purchased by the unknown European merchant was later donated to Stefano Borgia and arrived in Rome in 1778.

The Charta Borgiana, excluding the Lisbon fragment, was published by Schow in 1788 under the title Charta papyracea Graece scripta Musei Borgiani Velitris. Concerning the publication, the papyrologist Peter van Minnen noted that "[t]he excitement aroused [...] before it was published matched the lack of interest subsequently shown, when it turned out to be a list of forced labourers on the dykes." Still, according to the papyrologists James G. Keenan and Nikola D. Bellucci, the 1788 publication marks the beginning of papyrology as a discipline.

After the death of Stefano Borgia in 1804, the Museo di Velletri, which housed the manuscript, was put up for sale by Stefano Borgia's nephew, Camillo Borgia (1773–1817). The purchase agreement, concluded in 1814 with the French military officer and statesman Joachim Murat for the sum of 50,000 ducats, was ratified in 1817 by the king of Naples and Sicily, Ferdinand I of the Two Sicilies, after the French government had fallen earlier. The king ordered the transfer of the collection of the museum to the Royal Bourbon Museum (Real Museo Borbonico), the present-day National Archaeological Museum in Naples.

The text of the Naples manuscript was re-edited in 1915 by the German papyrologist Friedrich Preisigke as number 5124 of the first volume of the Sammelbuch griechischer Urkunden aus Ägypten, without inspecting the original; the papyrus is thus regularly cited as SB I 5124.

The papyrus was restored twice: in 1983 and subsequently in October 2008 by Mario Capasso and Natascia Pellè.

=== Lisbon fragment ===
The history of the Lisbon fragment of the papyrus (Ms. A[zul] 1725) is not well known. It is, however, certain that the fragment has been given to a Portuguese dignitary as a personal gift by Stefano Borgia some time between 1778, the year of the receipt of the papyrus in Rome, and 1787, when Schow finished his edition of the papyrus.

The Lisbon fragment originally belonged to the Convent of Our Lady of Jesus in Lisbon, before passing to the library of the Lisbon Academy of Sciences following the suppression of religious orders in Portugal in the mid-19th century.

The fragment was first published in 2007 (including a photo) and was edited as part of the 30th volume of the Sammelbuch griechischer Urkunden aus Ägypten (number 17292).

== Content ==
The Charta Borgiana is a manuscript consisting of several lists of men who worked for the village of Tebtynis at the irrigation dykes of Ptolemais Hormos for the usual five days. There is, however, some scholarly disagreement on whether the papyrus records the names of men from Tebtynis sent to Ptolemais Hormos – or vice versa.

The five-day work duty has been described as a tax-like annual service, which possibly could be performed by a substitute and from which an exemption by privilege may have been possible. This compulsory obligation is known as penthēmeros, a service to keep the canal system working. The workers were not confined to their own villages but could be dispatched up to 50 km (31 mi) away.

The first and longest list of the papyrus names 181 residents of Tebtynis at work in Ptolemais Hormou from 10 to 14 Mecheir of 193. In the translation of P. W. Pestman, this list starts as follows:

List of the men who have accomplished the dyke work of Tebtynis; in year 33, Mecheir 10–14 for (the canal of) Ptolemaïs Hormou: 181 men, whose names are as follows:

- Sarapion, son of Stotoëtis, grandson of Chairemon, his mother is Thenapynchis
- Protas, his brother, of the same mother;
- Sarapion, another brother, of the same mother;
- Paweites, son of Herakles, his mother is Eirene;

[...]

In tabular form the lists are as follows:

Work periods recorded in the papyrus
Line	Date (regnal year 33)	Date (Julian equivalent)	Canal	Men
3	Mecheir 10–14	4–8 February 193	Ptolemais Hormou	181
193	Mecheir 11–15	5–9 February 193	Pholemis	69
270	Phamenoth 2–6	26 February – 2 March 193	Pholemis	92
373	Pharmouth 5–9	31 March – 4 April 193	not preserved	35
416	—	1 April 193 – 5 April 193	—	—
549	—	13 September 193 – 17 September 193	—	—
556	—	12 September 193 – 16 September 193	—	—
