= Paulinus of St. Bartholomew =

Austrian missionary (1748 - 1806)

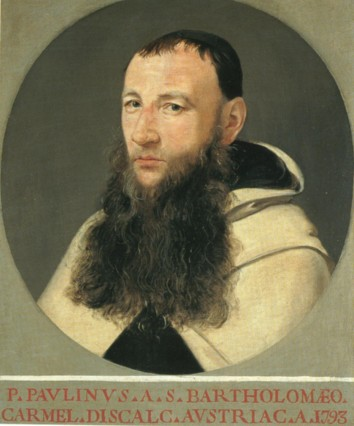
Paulinus of St. Bartholomew

Paulinus of St. Bartholomew (b. at Hof am Leithaberge in Lower Austria, 25 April 1748; d. in Rome, 7 January 1806) was an Austrian Carmelite missionary and Orientalist of Croatian origin. He is known by several names as Paulinus S. Bartholomaeo, Paolino da San Bartolomeo, Paulinus Paathiri, Paulin de St Barthelemi, Paulinus A S. Bartholomaeo, and was born Johann Philipp Wesdin, Ivan Filip Vezdin, or Johann Philipp Werdin.

He worked as a missionary in the Malabar region (modern day Kerala) and is credited with being the author of the first Sanskrit grammar to be published in Europe, and for being one of the first Orientalists to remark upon the close relationship between Indian and European languages, followed by others such as William Jones and Gaston-Laurent Coeurdoux.

== Life ==
Vezdin was born in a Burgenland Croat peasant family in Cimof, Lower Austria, and took the religious habit at the age of twenty. He studied theology and philosophy at Prague. Having entered into the seminary of the missions of his order at Rome, he did Oriental studies at the College of St Pancratius.

He was sent in 1774 as missionary to Malabar, India. After spending fourteen years in India, he was appointed vicar-general of his order and apostolic visitor. He was very well versed in languages: he spoke German, Latin, Greek, Hebrew, Hungarian, Italian, Portuguese, English, Malayalam, Sanskrit, and some other languages of India. He became known in Kerala as Paulinus Paathiri. He was one of the first to detect the similarity between Sanskrit and Indo-European languages, though the very first was likely Thomas Stephens.

Recalled in 1789 to Rome to give an account of the state of the mission in Indostan, he was charged with editing books – to correct the Catechisms and elementary books printed at Rome – for the use of missionaries. On account of political troubles he stayed from 1798 to 1800 at Vienna.

In Rome, he came into contact with Stefano Borgia, Secretary of Propaganda Fide, antiquarian scholar and patron, who had set up in Velletri, his native city, the very well-endowed Museo Borgiano. Borgia appointed him his private secretary and financed the publication of many volumes of indology, including the first European grammar of the Sanskrit language (Sidharubam seu Grammatica Samscrdamica), published in Rome in 1790. Paulinus also wrote, in Italian, a long essay on India (Viaggio alle Indie Orientali) which was translated into the principal European languages.

In 1800, Pope Pius VII appointed him as counsellor of the Congregation of the Index and as inspector of studies at the Pontifical Urban University. He wrote an account of his travels, translated into French, under the title Voyage aux Index Orientales, published at Paris in 1808.

While in Europe, he also made known the works of Johann Ernst Hanxleden (Arnos Paathiri). He had carried some of Hanxleden's works to Europe. He also wrote about Hanxleden and quotes him extensively in his memoirs.

When Borgia died suddenly at Lyons while accompanying Pius VII to Napoleon, Paulinus wrote his biography.

== Works ==
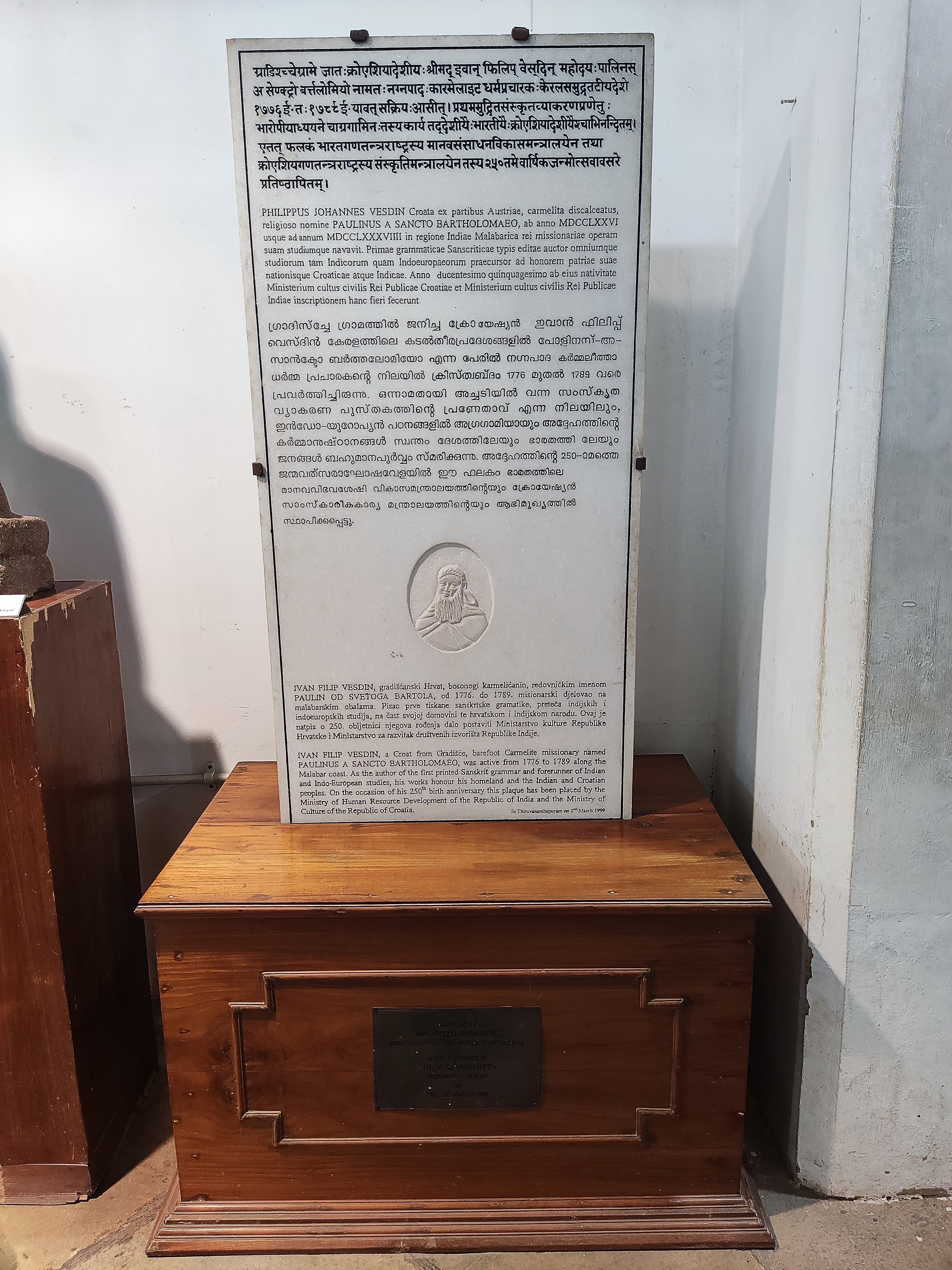
Tablet in Trivandrum

Paulinus wrote many learned books on the East, which were highly valued in their day, among them the first printed Sanskrit grammar. They include:

- Systema brahmanicum liturgicum, mythologicum, civile, ex monumentis indicis musei Borgiani Velitris dissertationibus historico-criticis illustratu (Rome, 1791), translated into German (Gotha, 1797)
- Examen historico-criticum codicum indicorum (Rome, 1792)
- Musei Borgiani Velitris codices manuscripti avences, Peguani, Siamici, Malabarici, Indostani (Rome, 1793)
- Viaggio alle Indie orientali (Rome, 1796), translated into German by Forster (Berlin, 1798)
- Sidharubam, seu Grammatica sanscridamica, cui accedit dissert. hiss. crit. in linguam sanscridamicam vulgo Samscret dictam (Rome, 1799), another edition of which appeared under the title "Vyacaranam" (Rome, 1804)
- India orientalis christiana (Rome, 1794), on the history of missions in India

Other works bear on linguistics and church history:

- Viaggio alle Indie Orientali umiliato alla Santita di N. S. Papa Pio Sesto pontefice massimo (Rome, 1796)
- Voyage aux Indes Orientales (Paris, 1808)
- Sectio prima de caelo ex tribus ineditis codicibus indicis manuscriptis (Rome, 1798)
- Atlas pour servir au voyage aux Indes orientales (Paris, 1808)
- De basilica S. Pancratii M. Christi disquisitio (Rome, 1803)
- Examen historico criticum codicum indicorum (Rome, 1792)
- India orientalis christiana continens fundationes ecclesiarum, seriem episcoporum (Rome, 1794)
- Jornandis vindiciae de Var Hunnorum auctore (Rome, 1800)
- Monumenti indici del Museo Naniano (Padova, 1799)
- Mumiographia Musei Obiciani exarata (Patavii, 1799)
- Musei Borgiani Velitris codices manuscripti Avenses Peguani Siamici Malabarici Indostani animadversionibus historico-criticis castigati et illustrati accedunt monumenta inedita, et cosmogonia Indico-Tibetana (Rome, 1793)
- Sidharubam seu Grammatica Samscrdamica (Rome, 1790)
- Systema Brahmanicum liturgicum mythologicum civile ex monumentis Indicis musei Borgiani Velitris dissertationibus historico-criticis illustravit (Rome, 1791)
- Vitae synopsis Stephani Borgiae S.R.E. cardinalis amplissimi (Rome, 1805)
- Vyacarana seu Locupletissima Samscrdamicae linguae institutio in usum Fidei praeconum in India Orientali, et virorum litteratorum in Europa (Rome, 1804) [scan]
- Notitia topographica, civilis, politica, religiosa missionis Malabaricae ad finem saeculi 18. (Rome, 1937)
- De manuscriptis codicibus indicis R. P. Joan Ernesti Hanxleden epistola ad. R. P. Alexium Mariam A. S. Joseph Carmelitam excalceatum (Vienna, 1799)
