= Johan Zoëga =

Danish entomologist and botanist

Johan Zoëga (7 October 1742 – 29 December 1788) was a Danish entomologist and botanist.

== Biography ==
Johan Zoëga was born at Ravsted in Schleswig. His father Poul Christian Zoëga was a parish priest. His cousin was the archaeologist Jörgen Zoega. He studied botany at the University of Uppsala where he was a pupil of Carl Linnaeus. He contributed to a work by Linnaeus who named the plant genus Zoegea after him. For some years he helped Georg Christian Oeder as his assistant at the University of Copenhagen Botanical Garden. When the position was revoked in 1770, he applied to the central administration and in 1771 became secretary of the Department of the College of Finance. In 1773 he was a clerk in the Funen office, in 1779 a commissioner in the Chamber of Finance (Rentekammeret) and in 1784 a deputy in the College of Finance (Finanskollegiet).

As a botanist, Zoëga wrote Flora Islandica (Soroe, 1772, Kopenhagen et Leipzig 1775)
