= Tietgensgade =

Street in Copenhagen, Denmark

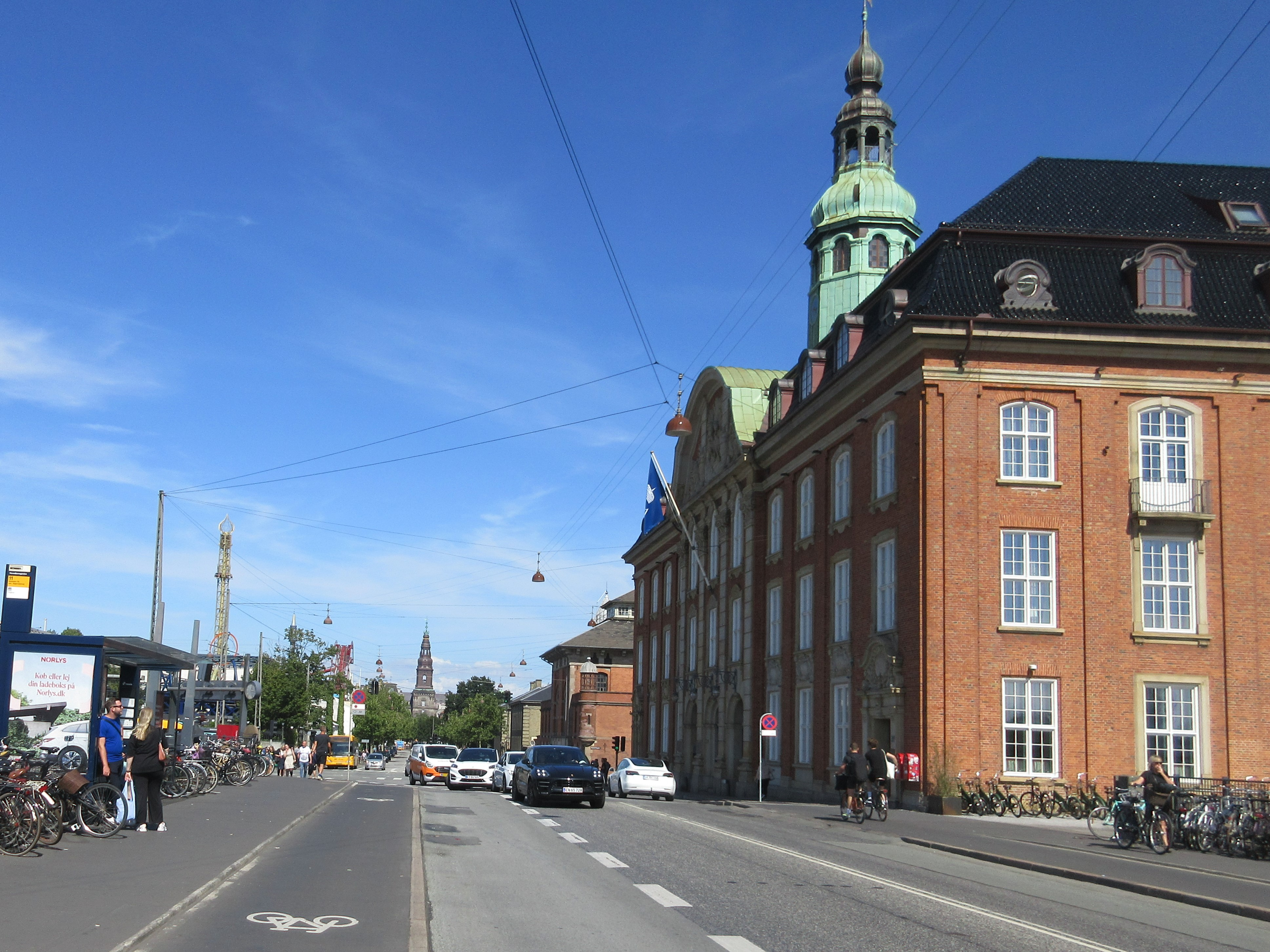
- Interactive map of Tietgensgade
- Length: 705 m (2,313 ft)
- Location: Copenhagen, Denmark
- Quarter: Vesterbro
- Nearest metro station: Copenhagen Central Station
- Northeast end: H. C. Andersens Boulevard
- Major junctions: Kvægtorvsgade
- Southwest end: Halmtorvet

Tietgensgade is a street in central Copenhagen, Denmark. It runs from H. C. Andersens Boulevard in the northeast to Kvægtorvgade at the Meat-Packing District in the southwest, linking Stormgade in the city centre with Ingerslevsgade and Halmtorvet/Sønder Boulevard in Vesterbro. The street follows the rear side of Tivoli Gardens and Copenhagen Central Station. The viaduct that carries it across the railway tracks at the central station is known as Tietgensbro (Tietgen's Bridge). A series of staircases and lifts provides direct access from the viaduct to the station platforms.

== History ==
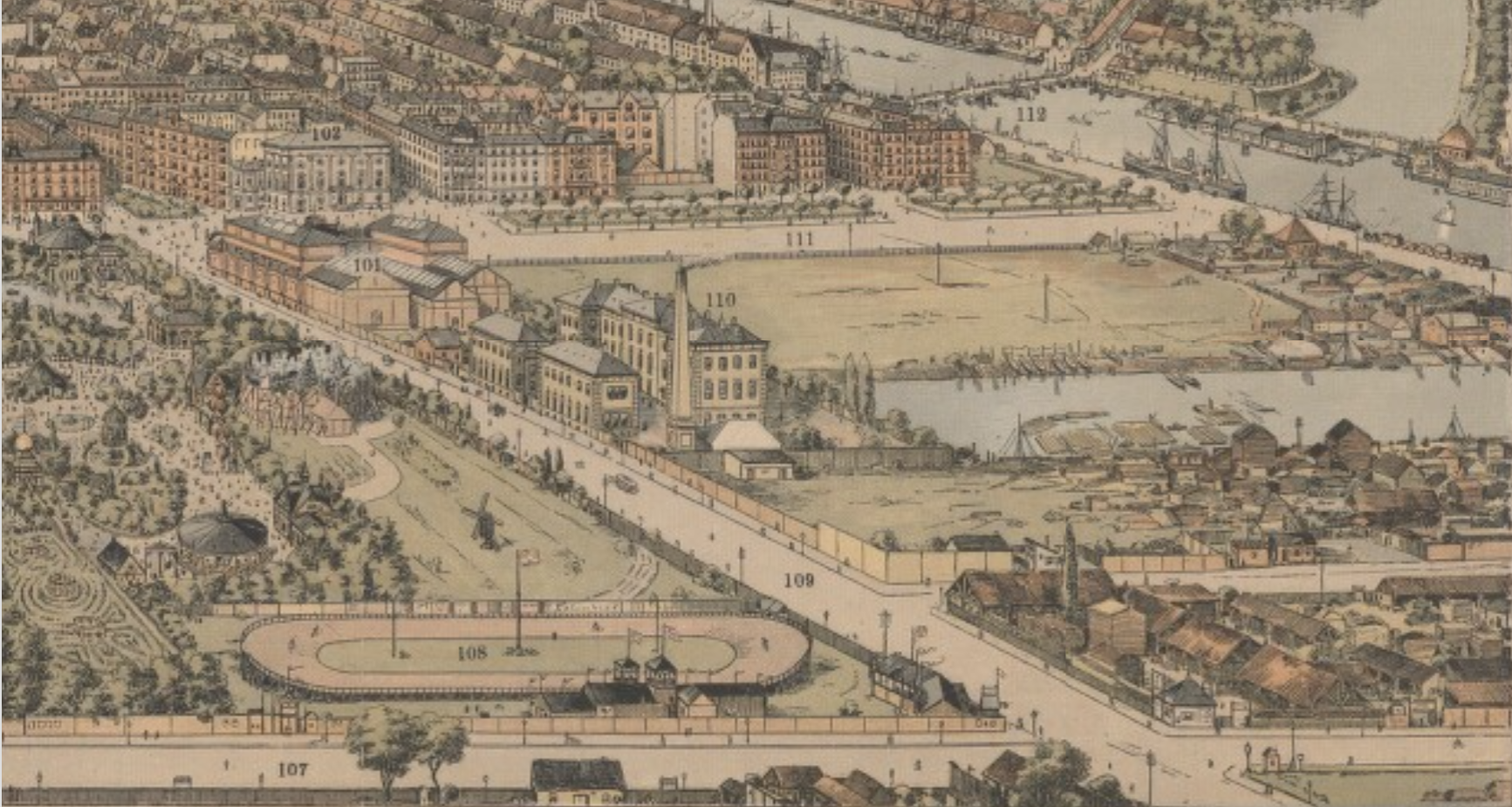
The street seen on a detail from a drawing by [Franz [Saive from 1897. Dantes Plads is visible in the upper left corner and a lumberyard can be seen in the bottom right corner

Tietgensgade was created when the southern part of Copenhagen's West Rampart, from the city's haymarket (now City Hall Square) to the harbourfront, was finally removed in the early 1880s. The street was then a direct continuation of Ny Vestergade and was therefore initially called Ny Vestergades Forlængelse (Ny Vestergade's Extension). The trapezoid shape of Dantes Plads reflects how Ny Vestergade used to curve around the right-hand side of the Ny Carlsberg Glyptotek.

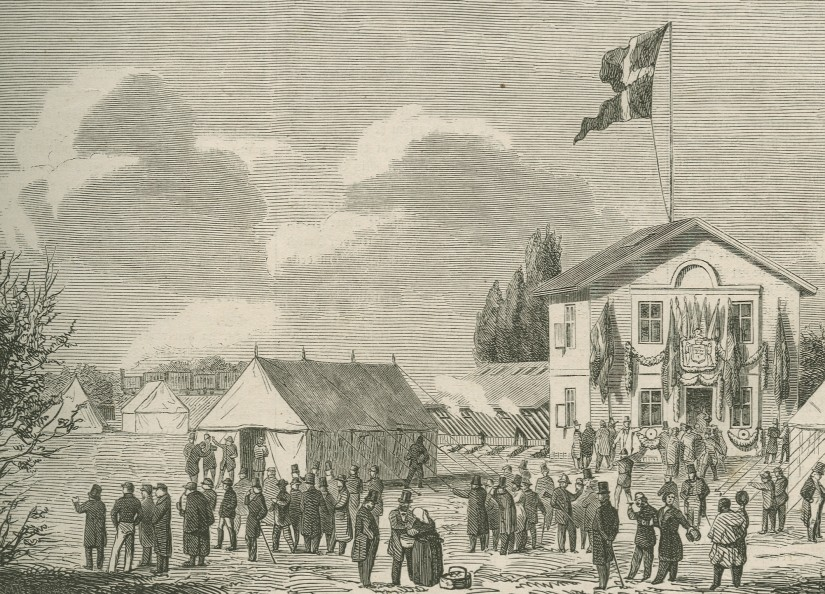
A social shooting event at Enighedsværn seen on an illustration from Illustreret Tidende

The far end of the street was initially dominated by extensive storage yards for timber and firewood. The country house Enighedsværn was also located in that end of the street. The building was taken over by the city and used as an annex school under the schools in Gasværksvej and Matthæusgade.

The street was renamed Tietgensgade in 1904 to commemorate Carl Frederik Tietgen who had died a few years earlier. The transfer of a narrow strip of Tivoli Gardens and the subsequent demolition of the Arena Theatre in 1906 made it possible to connect the street to Stormgade, creating a more straight route through the inner city. On 30 November 1911, Copenhagen Central Station was inaugurated on a site next to Tivoli Gardens. Its predecessor had been located on the other side of the street.

== Notable buildings ==
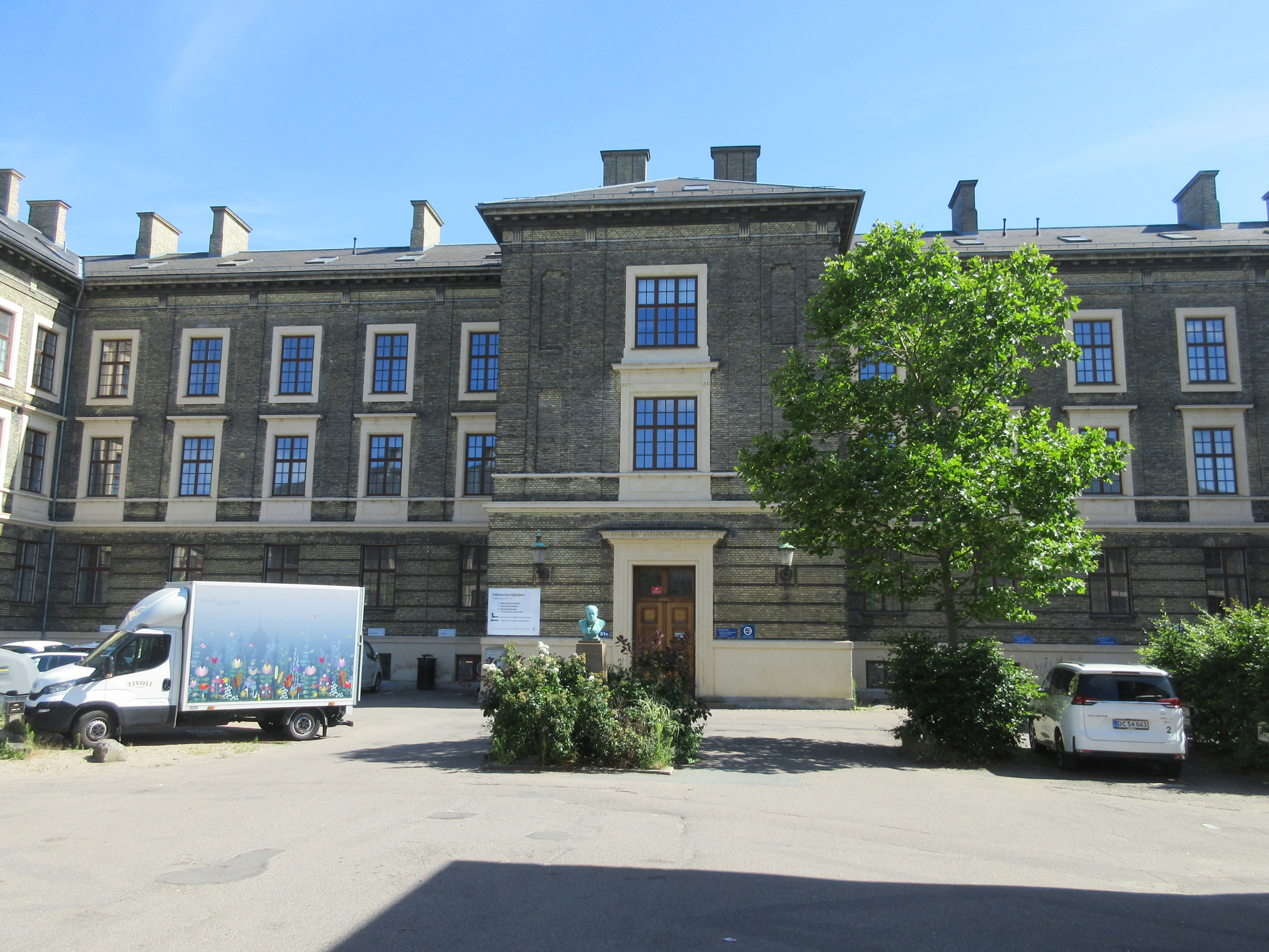
No. 31: The former Rudolph Bergh's Hospital

The former West Hospital (No. 31), later renamed Rudolph Berg's Hospital after its founder, Rudolph Bergh, is from 1885. The building was designed by Vilhelm Petersen,

The former Western Power Station (Vestre Elektricitetsværk), built in 1896-98 for Københavns Belysningsvæsen after the design by Ludvig Fenger, was one of the first power plants in Copenhagen. The disused plant has been converted into a district cooling plant and administration office for HOFOR, Greater Copenhagen's largest utility company.

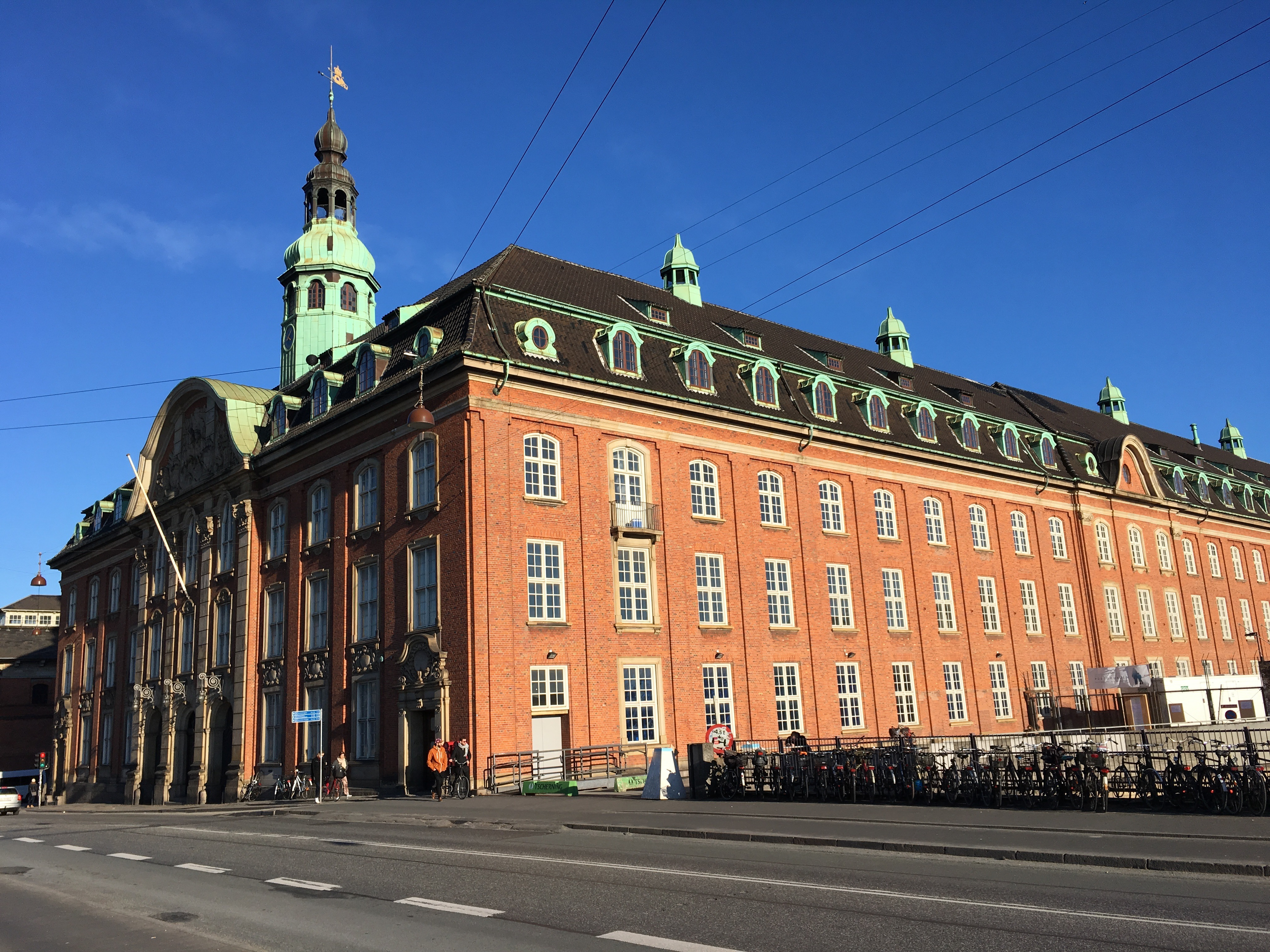
No. 35-39: Copenhagen Central Post Building

Copenhagen Central Post Building (No. 35-39) was built as new headquarters for the Danish Post and Telegraph Company and later taken over by Post Danmark. The building has now been converted into an upscale hotel, Villa Copenhagen. The Baroque Revival style building was designed by Heinrich Wenck, who also designed the Central Station, and completed in 1912.

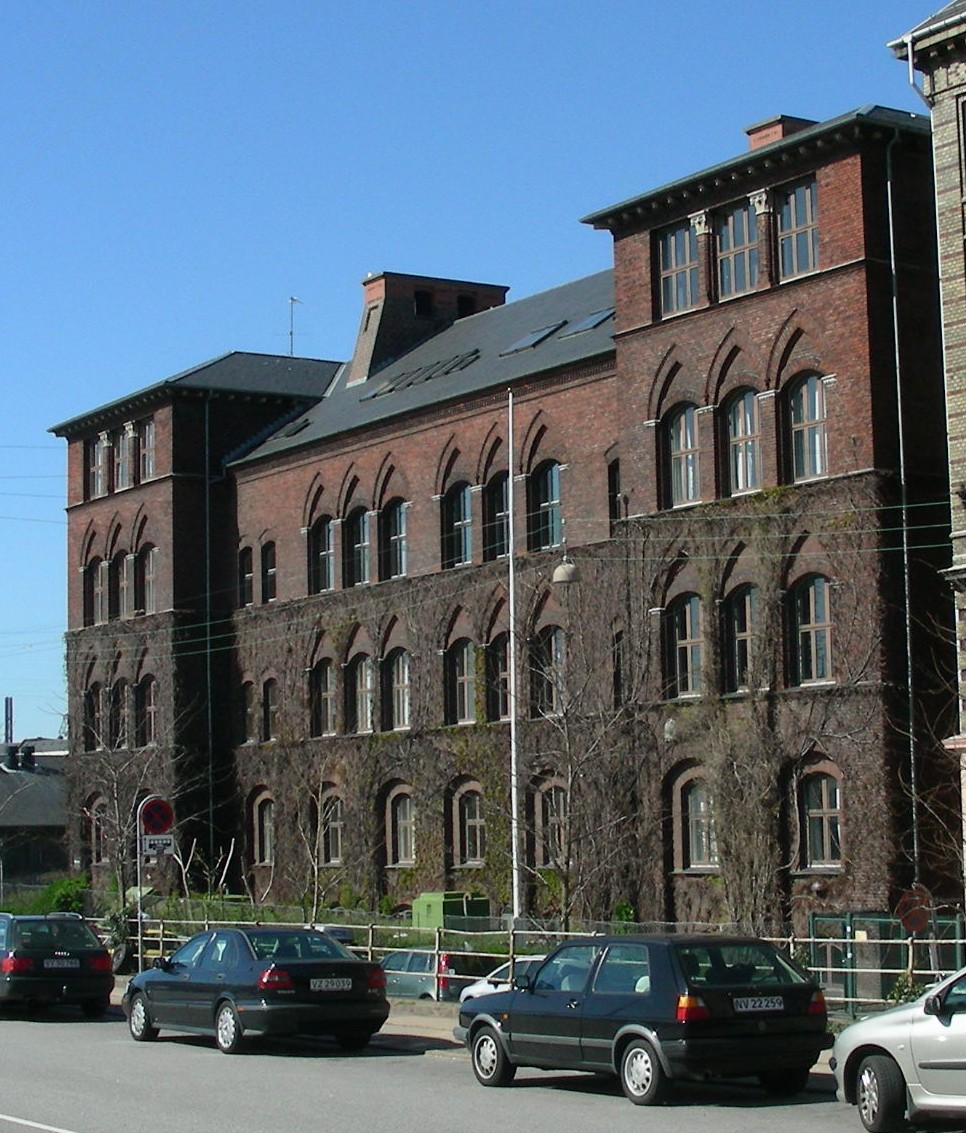
No. 74: Rysensteen Gymnasium

The Tivoli Concert Hall (No. 20) is from 1953 and was designed by Frits Schlegel and Hans Hansen. Its predecessor, a concert hall from 1802 designed by Knud Arne Petersen in "Moorish style", remniscient of the Nimb complex, was destroyed by schalburgtage in World War II. The new concert hall was expanded by 3XN in 2006.

DGI-Byen (No. 65), located at the corner of Tietgensgade and Ingerslevsgade, is a sports and swimming centre which opened in 2000. The building was designed by Schmidt Hammer Lassen Architects.

Rysensteen Gymnasium (No. 74, located at the corner with Kvægtorvsgade, is an upper-secondary school. The building is from 1886 and was designed by Hans Jørgen Holm who also designed the first stage of the Livestock Market on the other side of Kvægtorvsgade. The school was founded in 1850 and was originally located in Stormgade and Rysenstensgade.

== Public art and memorials ==
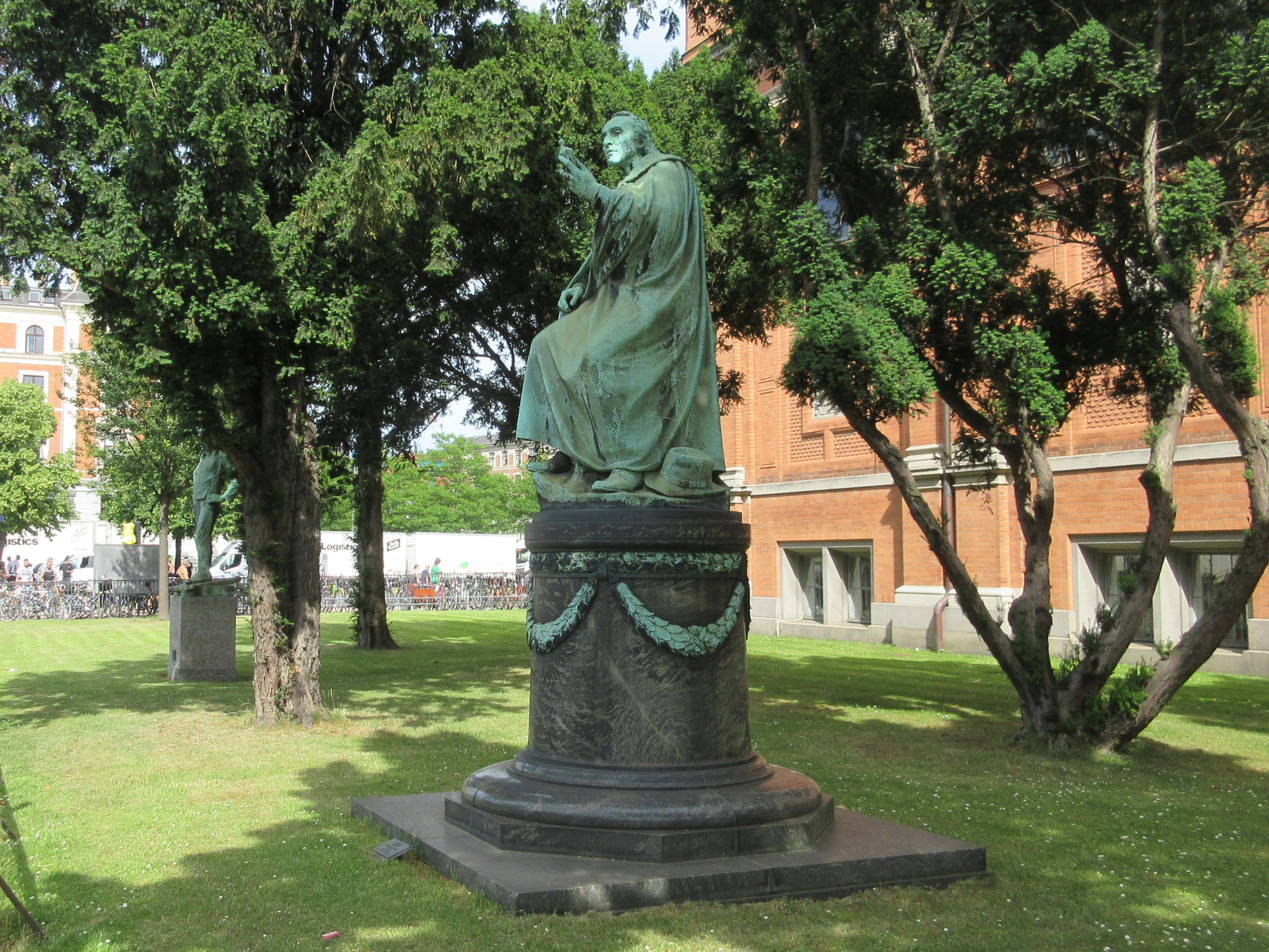
Georg Zoëga

The garden strip along the Ny Carlsberg Glyptotek features a number of monuments and other artworks that faces the street. These include a statue of the archeologist Georg Zoëga by Ludvig Brandstrup. The monument is flanked by two statues by Constantin Meunier, The Harbour Worker (left) and The Sower /right). A little further down the street, on a narrow lawn in front of the museum's Hack Kampmann Wing, stands a vronze statue of a standing woman, Guapa, created by Gottfred Eickhoff in 1951.

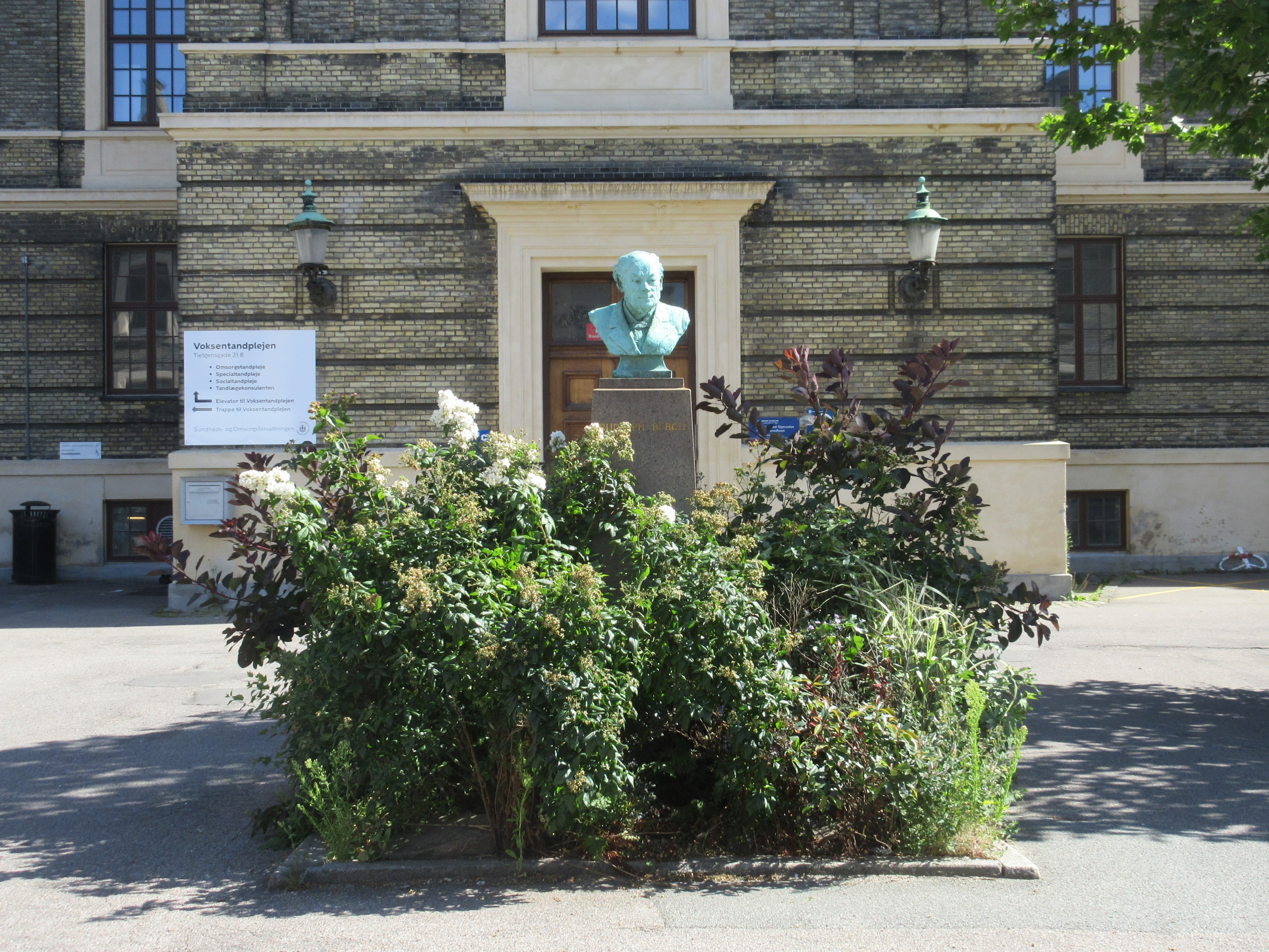
Bust of Rudolph Bergh

In front of Rudolph Berg's Hospital stands a bust of Rudolph Berg. It was created by Peder Severin Krøyer in 1894 and later presented to the hospital. It was unveiled at its current location in 1909.

Utopia, a bronze statue of an obese man by Keld Moseholm Jørgensen, was installed in front of DGI-Byen in 2007.

== Transport ==
A series of staircases and lifts provide direct access from Tietgensbro to the platforms of Copenhagen Central Station. The main entrance to the City Circle Line metro station is located in Rewentlovsgade.
