= Ludvig Brandstrup =

Danish sculptor (1861–1935)

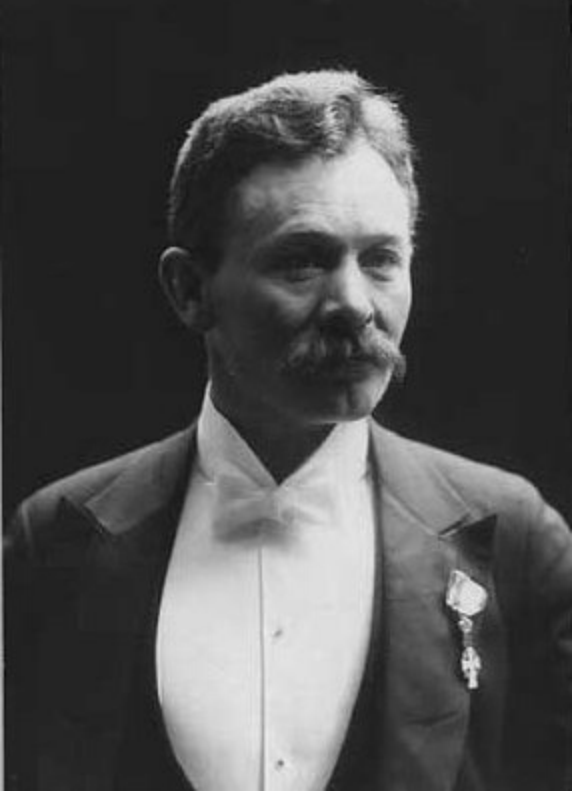
- Born: 17 August 1861; Tranekær, Denmark
- Died: 13 May 1935 (aged 73); Copenhagen, Denmark
- Resting place: Vestre Kirkegård
- Education: Royal Danish Academy of Fine Arts
- Known for: Sculpting
- Awards: Thorvaldsen Medal (1899); Eckersberg Medal (1919)

Signature
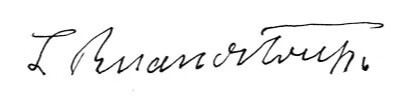

Ludvig Brandstrup (16 August 1861 – 13 May 1935) was a Danish sculptor. He is remembered above all for his equestrian statue of Christian IX in Esbjerg but was also one of the most competent portraitists of his day.

== Early life and education ==
Brandstrup was born in Tranekær on the Danish island of Langeland. He was the son of Laurits Christian Frederik Michael Brandstrup (1812–1900) and Johanne Kirstine Fenger (1820–98).

Brandstrup attended Sorø Academy before training for five years as a carpenter with Severin and Andreas Jensen in Copenhagen, after which he spent a year studying in the sculptor Vilhelm Bissen's studio in 1884 where he learnt the art of sculpting marble in the Thorvaldsen style. He then spent a short period at Copenhagen Technical College from where he entered the Royal Danish Academy of Fine Arts in 1885, graduating in 1888.

== Career ==
He first exhibited at the Charlottenborg Spring Exhibition in 1886 before winning the Neuhausen Medal in 1889 for a portrait of Frederik Ludvig Liebenberg. In 1899, he was awarded the Thorvaldsen Medal for the Equestrian statue of Christian IX which stands on the central square in Esbjerg. In 1890 he first travelled to Italy with an academy scholarship, and from 1893 to 1894 he was again in Florence on a two-year study period. During his journeys to Italy, he was inspired by the Florentine Renaissance style, especially Donatello's work. The influence of the Classical style can be seen in his Atlante (1903) and Psyke (1921).

Brandstrup became one of his generation's best portraitists, often receiving orders from the brewer Carl Jacobsen. His sensitive work includes busts of the artist Vilhelm Kyhn (c. 1889), the art historian Julius Lange (1896), the philosopher Harald Høffding (1900) and a double bust of Carl Jacobsen and his wife Ottilia (1904). Other important works include statues of Ottilia Jacobsen (Glyptoteket, 1905), the jurist Georg Morville in Viborg and the astronomer Ole Rømer at the Technical University of Denmark in Copenhagen.

== Awards ==
In 1896, Brandstrup was awarded the Eckersberg Medal and in 1899, he received the Thorvaldsen Medal.

== Personal life ==
He was married in 1894 to Bertha Nancy Hirschsprung (1873–1918). After the death of his first wife, he was married in 1926 to Johanne Sofie Frederikke Hais Madsen (1872–1960).

== Selected works ==
- Busts of Carl and Ottilia Jacobsen, Ny Carlsberg Glyptotek, Copenhagen (1904)
- Bust of Andreas Peter Weis, Ny Carlsberg Glyptotek, Copenhagen (1930)
- Bust of Peter Lange-Müller, Royal Danish Theatre, Copenhagen (1931)
- Bust of Julius Lange, Danish National Gallery, Copenhagen (1896)

=== Public art ===
- Christian IX, Esbjerg (1889)
- Christian IX Memorial, Holstebro (1906)
- Georg Morville, Viborg Museum, Viborg (1910)
- Georg Zoëga, Ny Carlsberg Glyptotek, Copenhagen (1910)
- Peter Buhl Memorial, Fredericia (1912)
- Natalie Zahle, Ørstedsparken, Copenhagen (1916)
- Ole Rømer, Kroppedal Museum, Vridskøselille (1917)
- Carl Jacobsen, Carlsberg, Copenhagen (1921)

== Image gallery ==
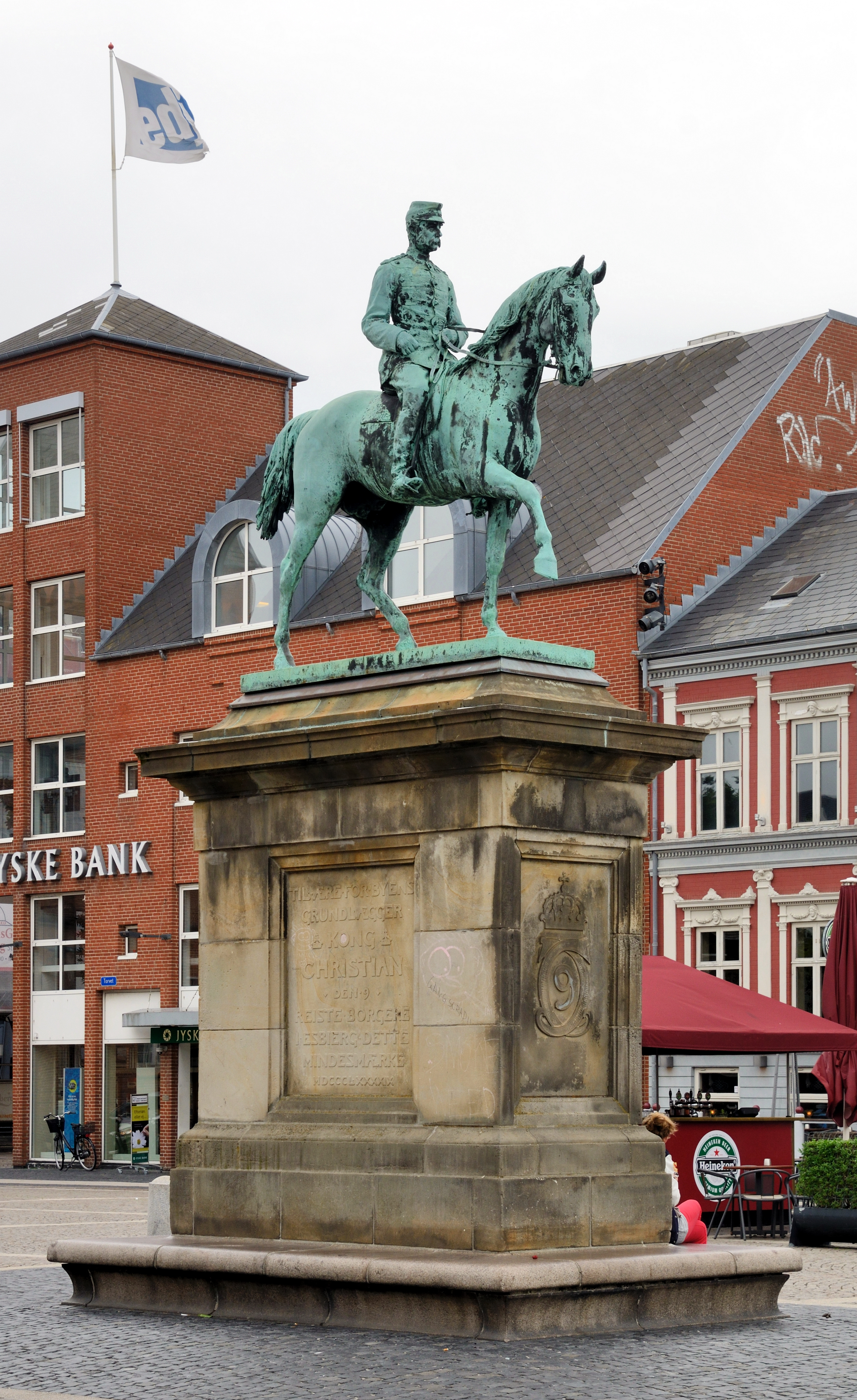
Christian IX
Esbjerg (1889)

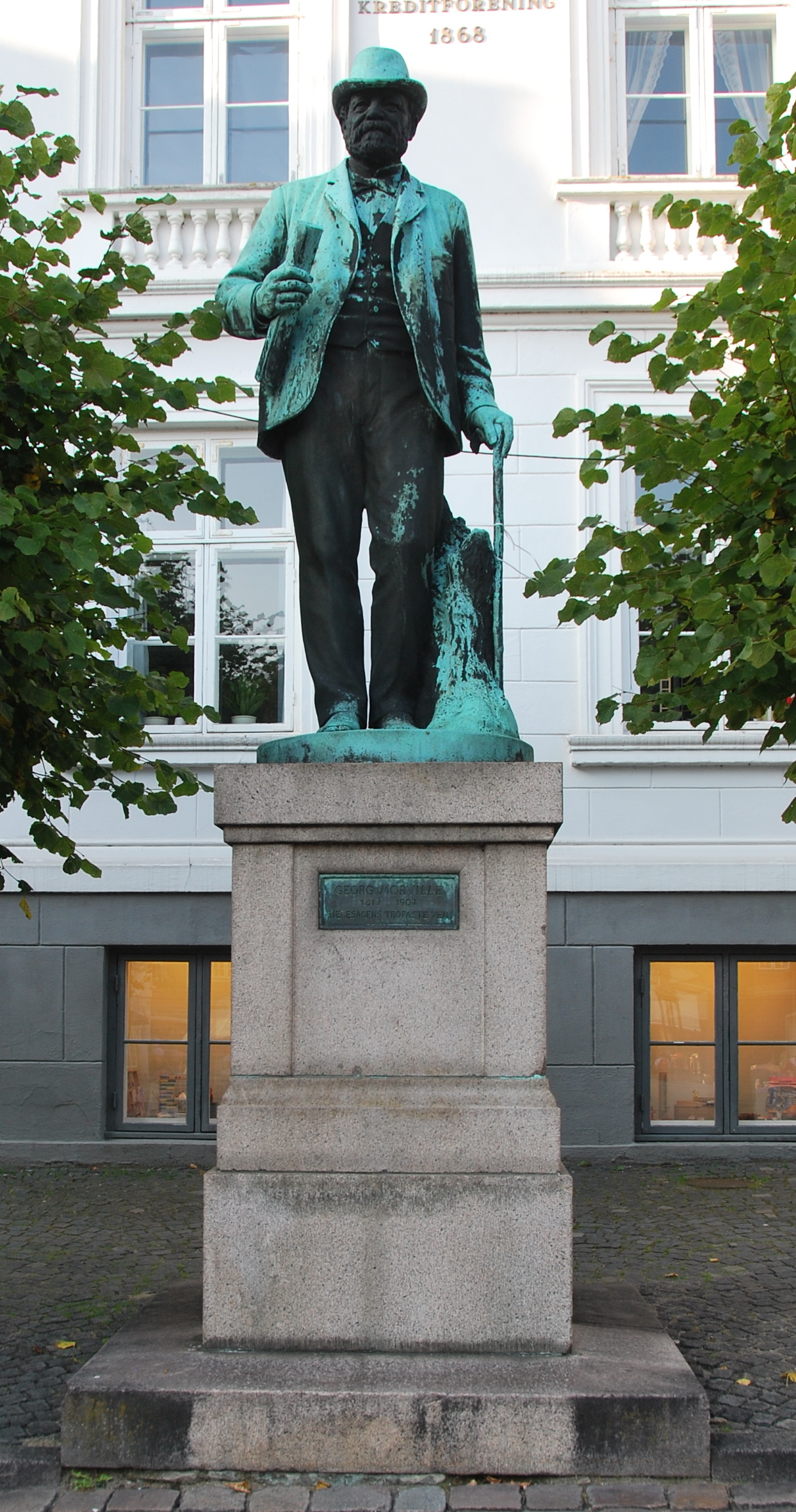
Georg Morville
Viborg (1910)

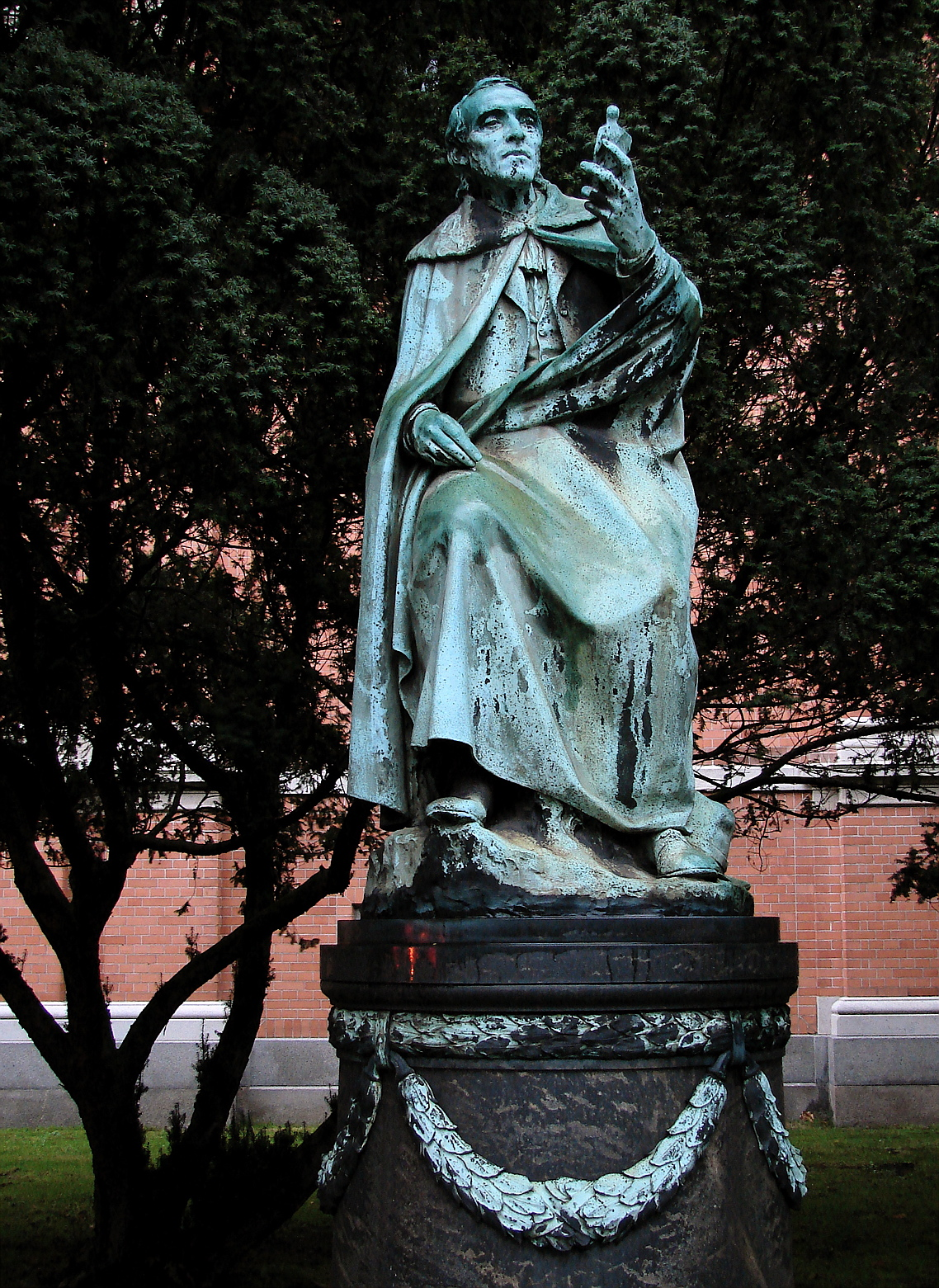
Georg Zoëga
Copenhagen (1910)

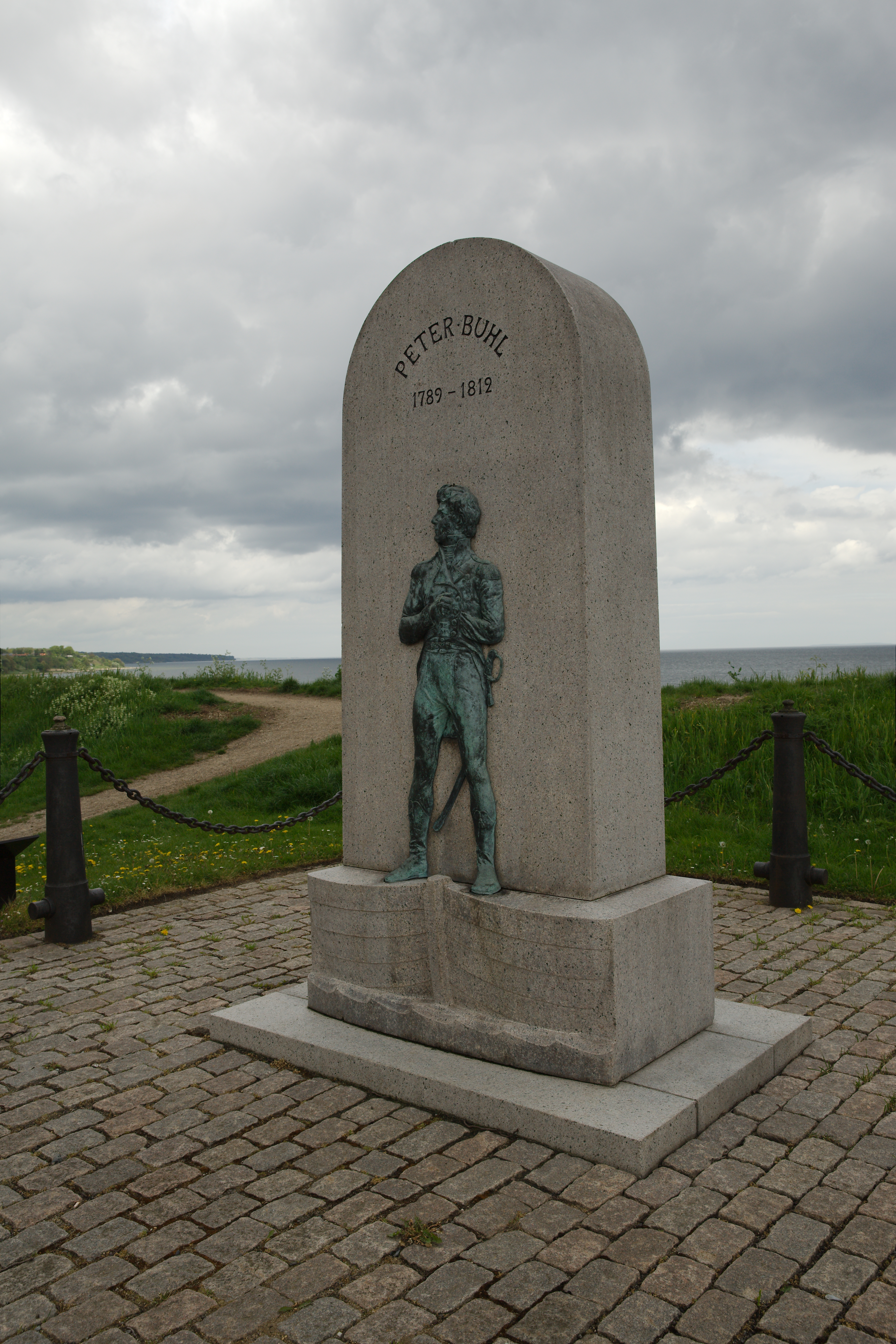
Peter Buhl Memorial
Fredericia (1912)

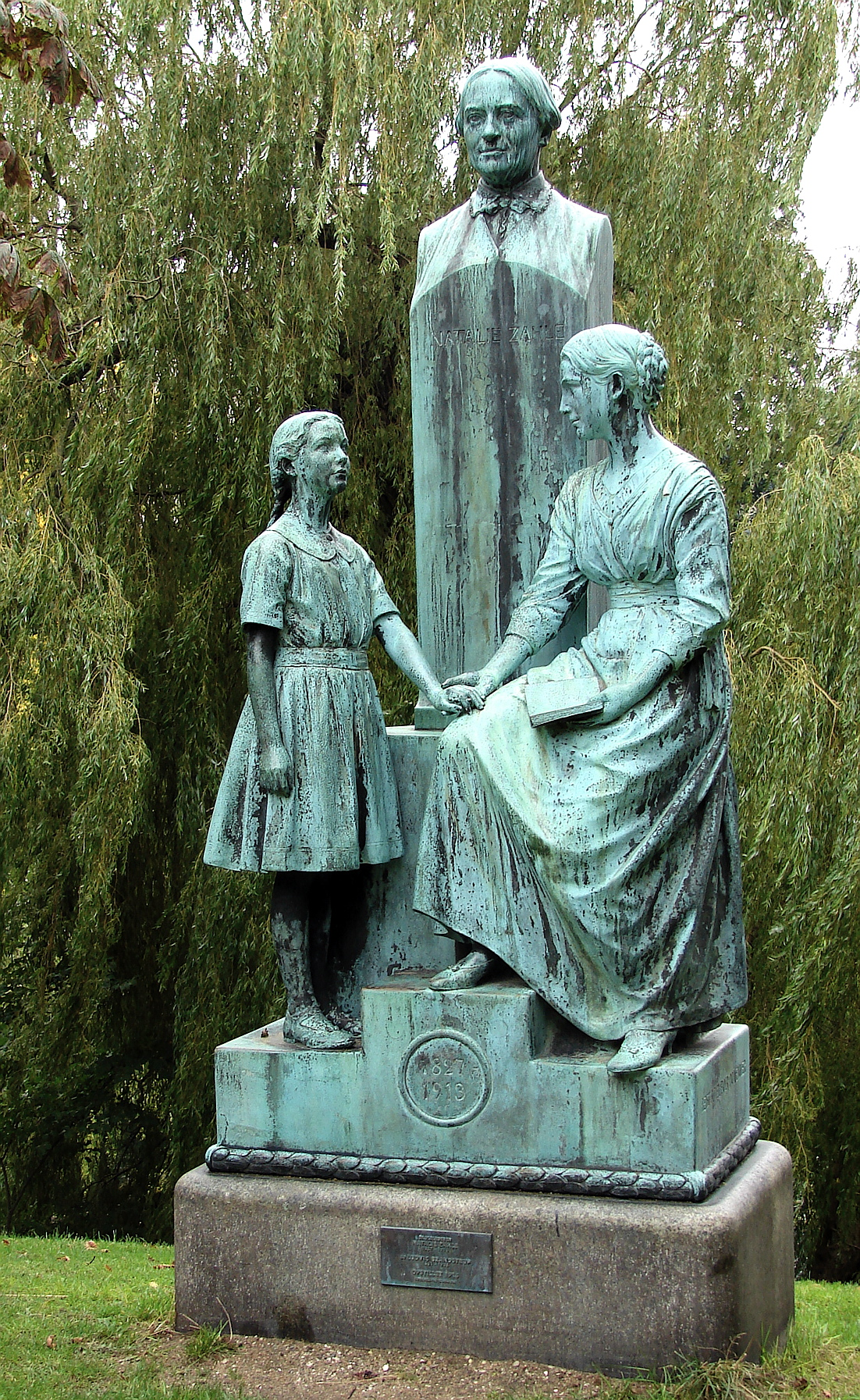
Natalie Zahle
Copenhagen (1916)

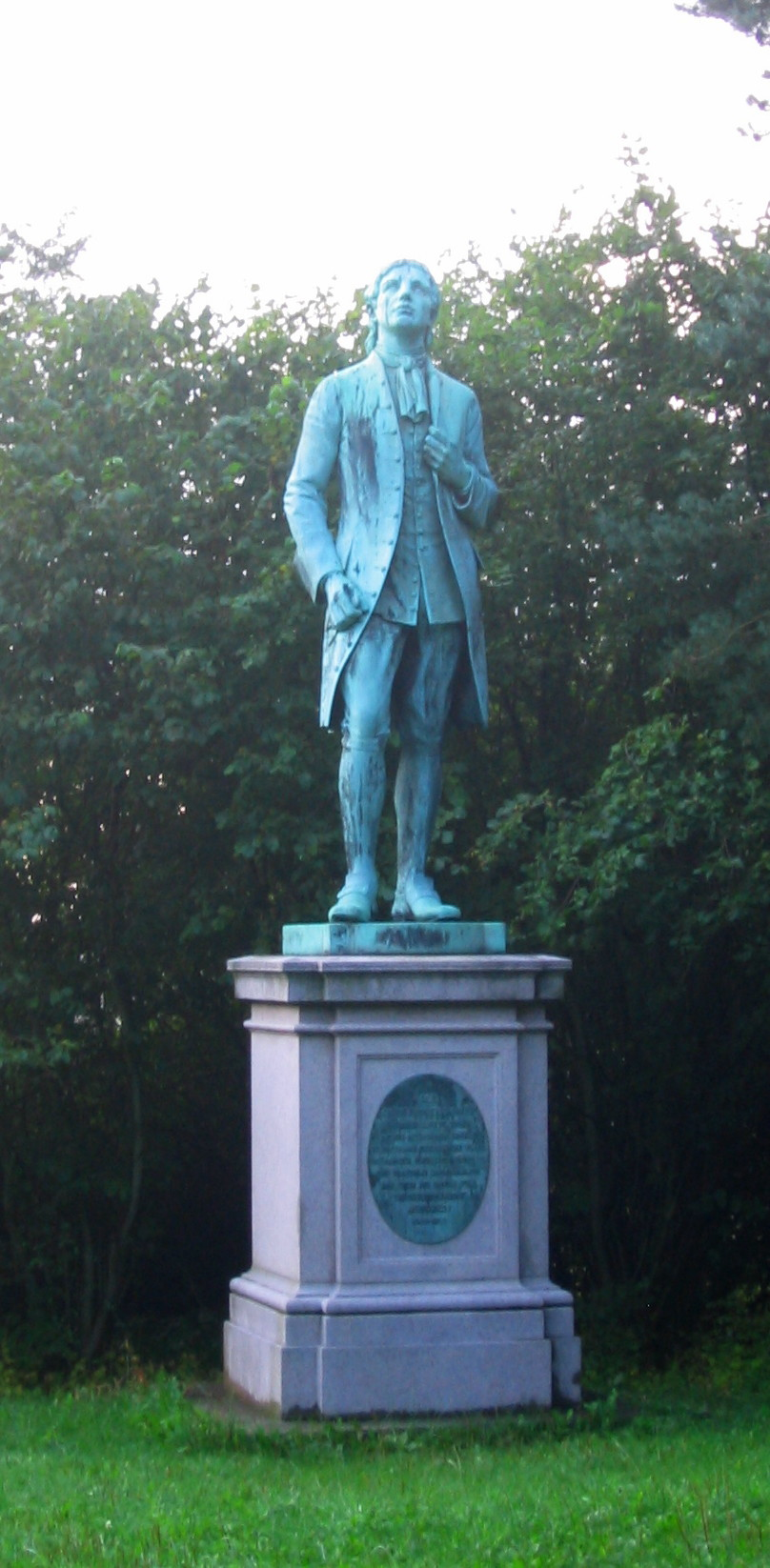
Ole Rømer
Vridsløselille (1917)

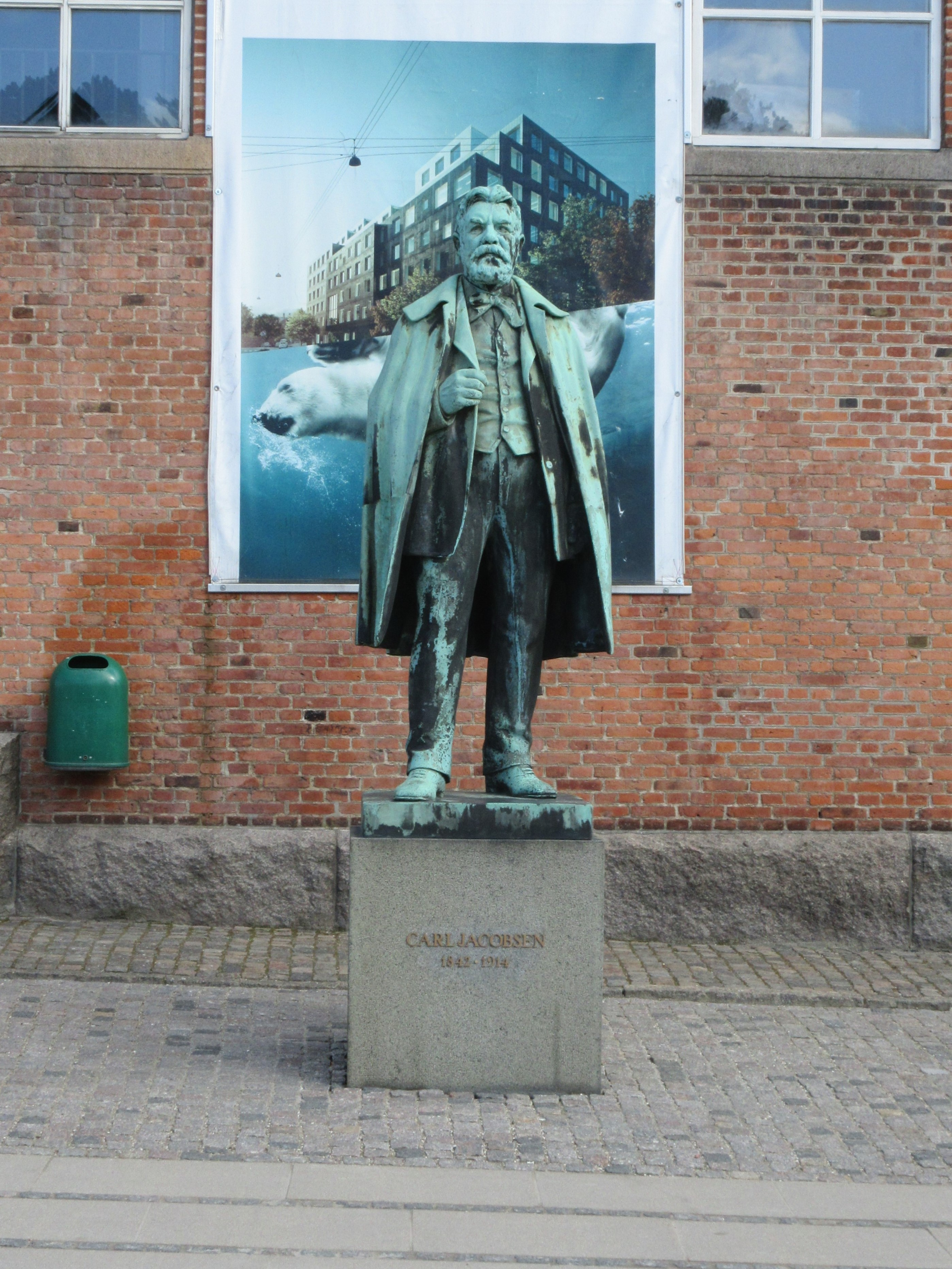
Carl Jacobsen
Copenhagen (1921)

== Literature ==
- Brandstrup, Ludvig; Oppermann, Theodor (1932). Billedhuggeren Ludvig Brandstrup. Med Indledning Af Th. Oppermann (in Danish).
