= Georg Zoëga =

Danish archaeologist, numismatist and anthropologist (1755–1809)

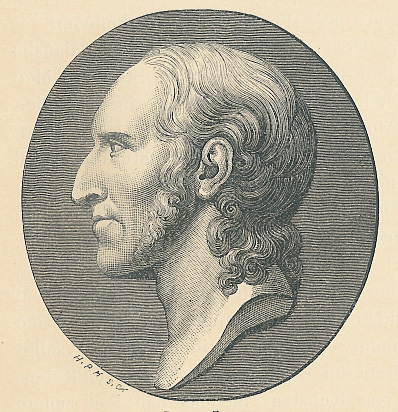
Georg Zoëga

Georg Zoëga (né Jørgen Zoëga; 20 December 1755 – 10 February 1809) was a Danish scientist. He was noted for his work as an archaeologist, numismatist and anthropologist.

== Biography ==
Jørgen Zoëga was born at Daler parish in Tønder Municipality, Southern Jutland. His father, Vilhad Christian Zoëga (1721–1790), whose family came originally from Northern Italy, was the parish priest at Møgeltønder Church; his mother Henriette Emilie Ottosdatter Clausen (ca 1735–1763) was daughter of the superintendent of Schackenborg Castle. His brother was botanist Johan Zoëga (1742–1788).

As a boy, Jørgen was taught at home and then attended the gymnasium in Altona. He went in 1773 to the University of Göttingen and later to Leipzig, studying philosophy and the Classics. Repeated journeys to Italy developed an interest in archaeology, which had awakened early in him. In 1782, thanks to the Danish minister Ove Høegh-Guldberg (1731–1808), he received for two years a pension from the State. From Vienna, where he studied under the celebrated numismatist Joseph Hilarius Eckhel (1737–1798), Zoëga went to Rome early in 1783. Through introductions, he received here a kindly welcome from Stefano Borgia (1731–1804) then a prelate and later cardinal.

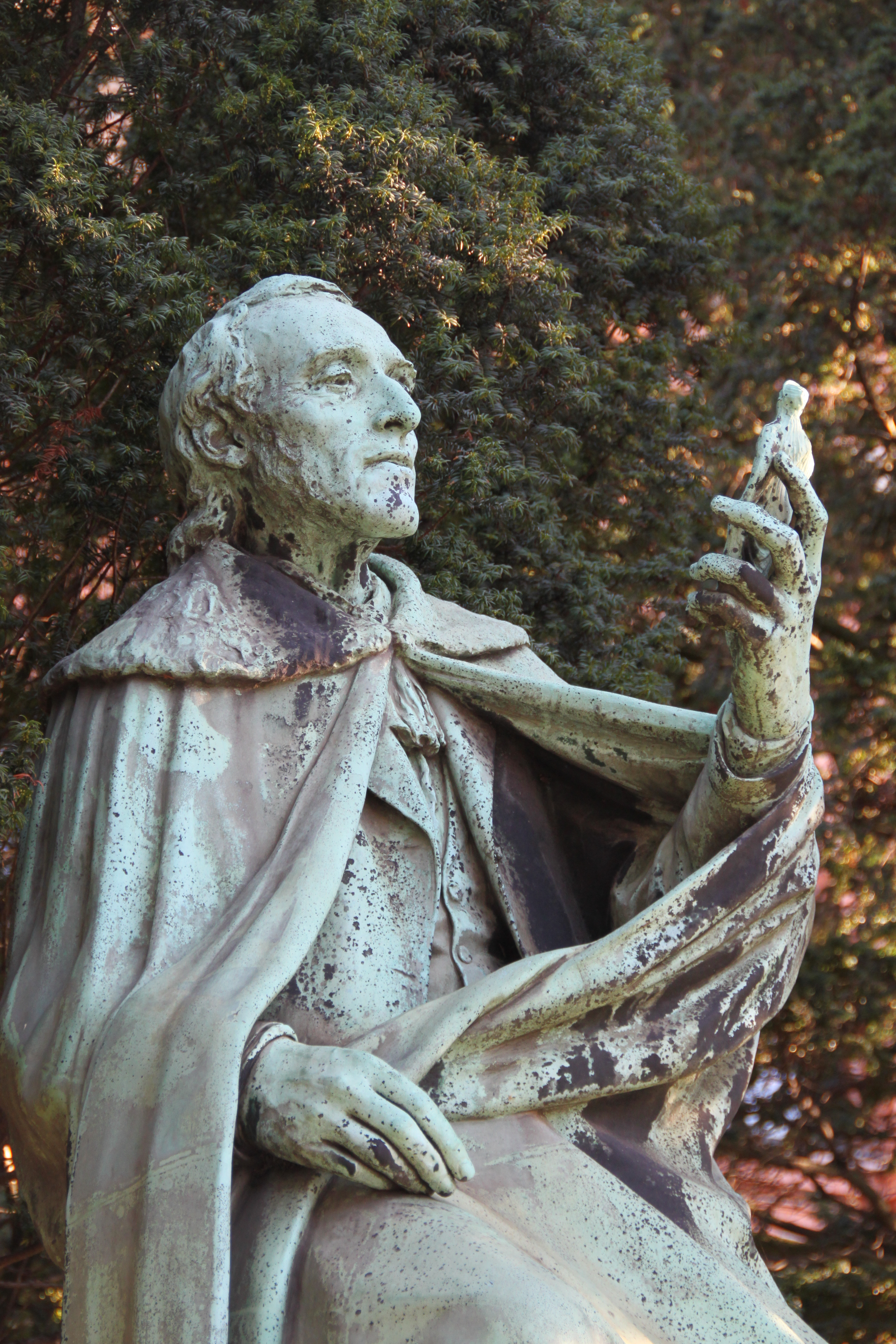
Georg Zoëga statue at Ny Carlsberg Glyptotek

On his way home in 1784, Zoëga heard in Paris of the political overthrow of his patron Høegh-Guldberg. He therefore returned to Rome and took up permanent abode in that city. He had before this catalogued and exhaustively described Cardinal Borgia's extensive collection of coins and Coptic manuscripts. The prelate now gave him strong support and Pope Pius VI granted him annual support. With the aid of influential friends, he received permanent assistance from Denmark, and in 1790 was made an honorary member of the Royal Danish Academy of Fine Arts in Copenhagen. When his patron, Cardinal Borgia, was exiled from Rome in 1798, Zoëga, grateful for the cardinal's hospitality to Danes who had gone to Rome, obtained a pension for Borgia from the state revenues of Denmark.

From 1798, Zoëga was Danish consul at Rome and a member of the Royal Danish Academy of Fine Arts at Copenhagen. His work in numismatics led him to take up Egyptological and Coptic studies, which he conducted with success. By his power of penetration and sound judgment, he pointed out to later investigators the path to be followed in interpreting hieroglyphics.

In his work on the Rosetta Stone, French linguist and orientalist Silvestre de Sacy (1758–1838), highlighted a suggestion made by Jørgen Zoëga in 1797 that the foreign names in Egyptian hieroglyphic inscriptions might be written phonetically. This proved to be a very fruitful insight which led to decipherment.

Zoëga is regarded as an associate of German art historian and archaeologist Johann Joachim Winckelmann (1717–1768) and Italian antiquarian Ennio Quirino Visconti (1751–1818) in establishing the basis for archaeological science. His services to learning were also acknowledged in foreign countries by his election in 1806 to membership in the Academies of Science at Berlin and Vienna. Zoëga died in Rome three years later, in 1809, aged 53. Zoëga wrote several treatises on classical archaeology, also translated into German by Welcker, Georg Zoegas Abhandlungen (Göttingen, 1817). A work on the topography of Rome was left unfinished in manuscript.

== Selected works ==
- Nummi aegyptii imperatorii (Rome, 1787)
- De origine et usu obeliscorum (Rome, 1797)
- Bassorilievi antichi di Roma (2 vols., Rome, 1808), translated into German by Friedrich Gottlieb Welcker (1811)
- Catalogus codicum copticorum manuscriptorum, qui in museo Borgiano Velitris adservantu (Rome, 1810), a posthumous work.

== See also ==
- Statue of Georg Zoëga

== Oher sources ==
- Karen Ascani, Paola Buzi, Daniela Picchi (2015) The Forgotten Scholar: Georg Zoëga (1755-1809) (Brill) ISBN 978-90-04-29023-5
