= Valdemarsgade =

Street in Copenhagen, Denmark

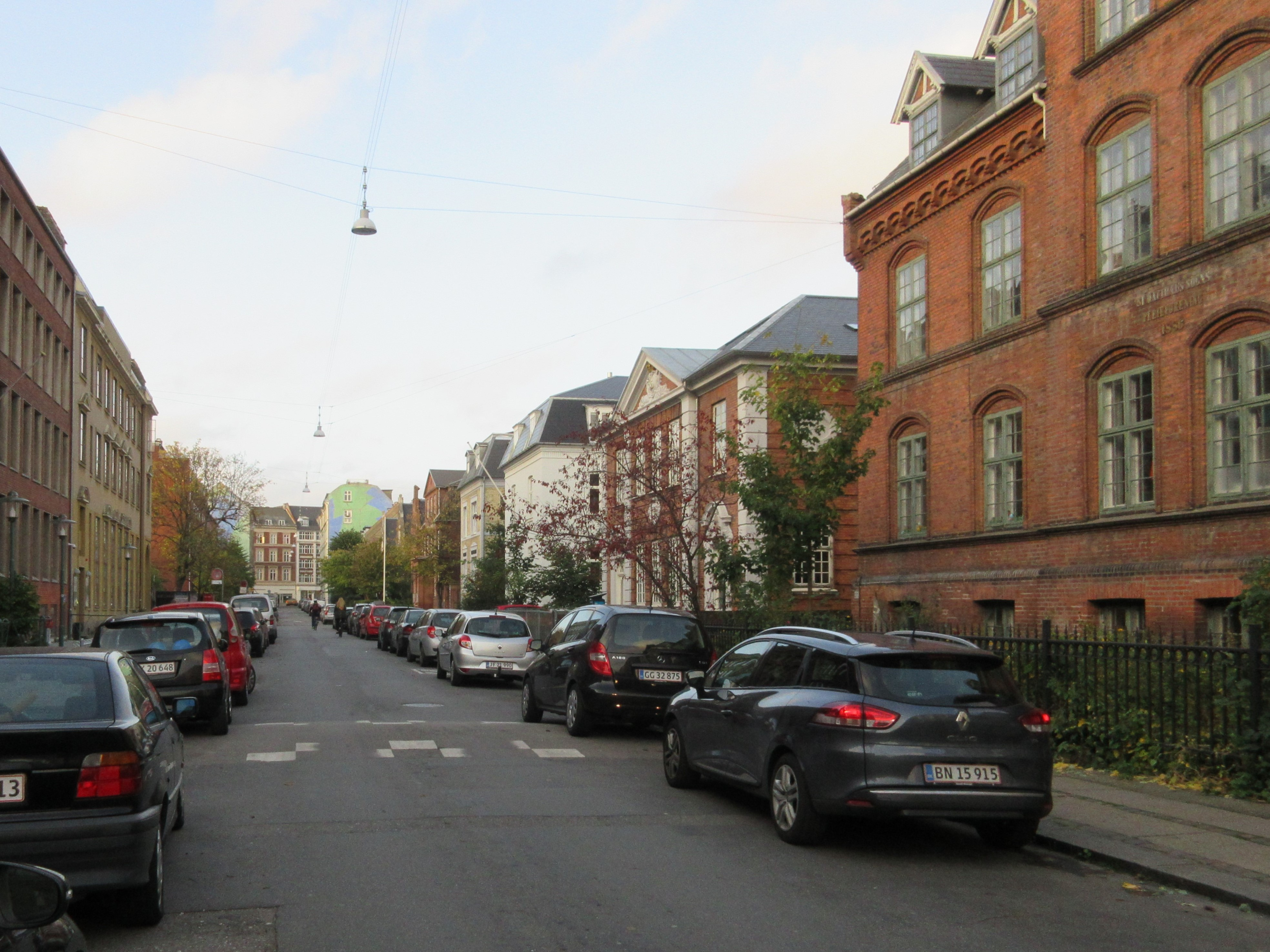
- Interactive map of Valdemarsgade
- Length: 750 m (2,460 ft)
- Location: Copenhagen, Denmark
- Quarter: Vesterbro
- Nearest metro station: Enghave Plads
- Coordinates: 55°40′7.71″N 12°32′56.18″E
- North end: Vesterbrogade
- Major junctions: Istedgade
- South end: Sønder Boulevard

Valdemarsgade is a street in the Vesterbro district of Copenhagen, Denmark. It runs from Vesterbrogade in the north to Sønder Boulevard in the south, intersecting Istedgade and Dybølsgade on the way. St. Matthew's Church, Vesterbro's oldest and largest church, is located in the street. Most of the street is lined with five-storey, late 18th-century apartment blocks but its northern end stands out from the surrounding neighbourhood with its low, detached buildings with small front gardens. One of the properties, De Suhrske Friboliger, is listed on the Danish registry of protected buildings and places.

== History ==
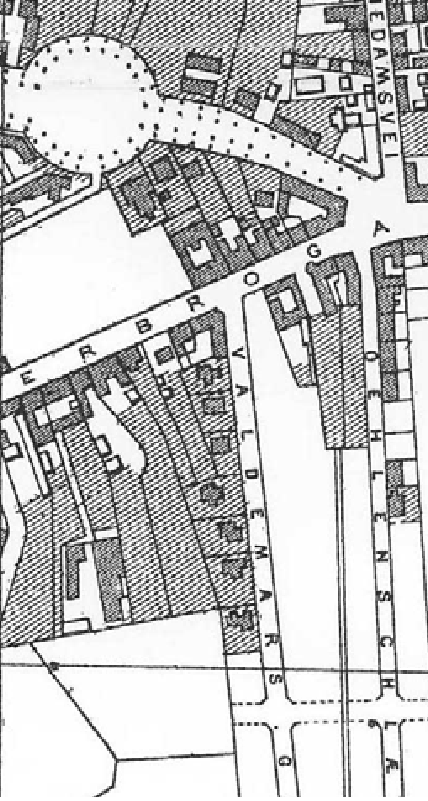
Valdemarsgade in 1871: The east side of the street has not yet been built over. The round shape in the upper right corner is Sankt Thomas Plads on Frederiksberg Allé.

The land where Valdemarsgade was later established was originally part of the Western Common (Vester Fælled). St. Johns Hospital was built on the coast at the southern end of present-day Valdemarsgade in the 17th century. Colloquially known as the plague House (Pesthuset), it housed a combination of psychiatric, poor and disabled patients. St. John's Cemetery (The plague Cemetery/Pestkirkegården) was located a little further indland in the area between Valdemarsgade and Enghavevej. The city's gallows was also located in this area. St. John's Hospital was moved in 1769 while it is not known when the cemetery was closed.

A property at the northern end of present-day Valdemarsgade was in 1731 owned by Royal Kitchen Inspector and Poultry Purveyor Christoffer Nelling and was grazed by geese. In the 1780s, royal agent Johannes Christopher Amberg and konferensråd Jessenius Clasen established a tobacco farm at the site which was to produce tobacco for the tobacco factory Friheden but the enterprise went bankrupt.

In 1799, justitsråd, War Commissioner Heinrich Christian Kilde bought the estate. Kilde used the property as a summer residence. The house was a two-storey, half-timbered building. Kilde was an enthusiastic gardener and acquired more land in the 1800s and 1810s. Henriette Lund (1829–1909), a niece of Søren Kierkegaard, describes the garden in her posthumously published memoirs. She spent five summers on the estate in the period 1836–1840. Actor at the Royal Danish Theatre Peter William Jerndorff (1842–1926), who grew up on the estate, has also described it in his memoirs. The family moved "out to Vesterbro" after his parents rented the first floor in 1844 and lived there until 1852.

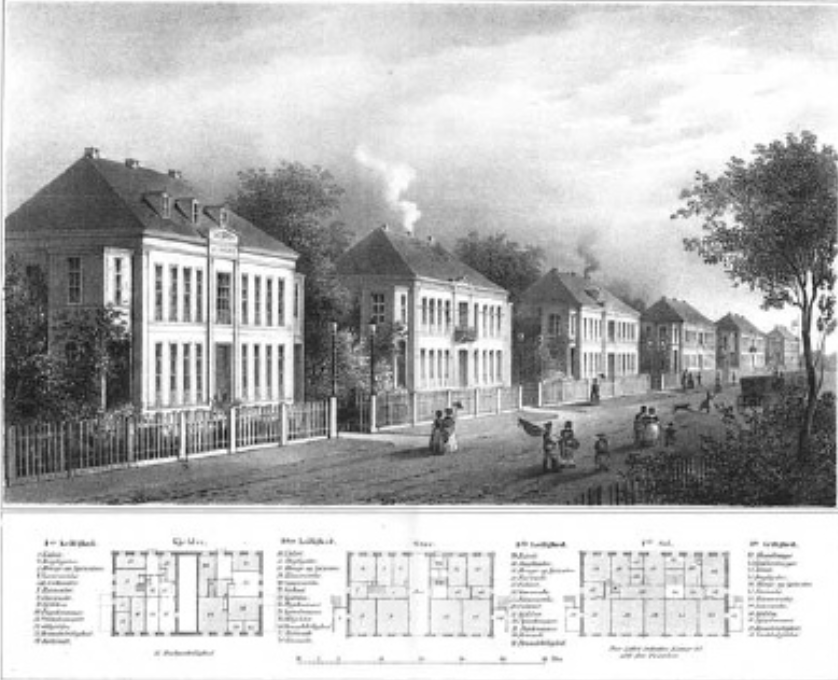
Unrealized plan for buildings on the east side of Valdemarsgade (Origins unknown).

In 1850, the property was purchased by ropemaker and developer Hans Rasmussen Thrane. He had plans to create a new road with "beautiful places for people of the upper classes who had their businesses inside the city". He commissioned a masterplan for the development but sold the estate to Captain-Lieutenant Jens Langemarck in 1852 before it was ready. In 1857, the property was acquired by a consortium consisting of timber trader Emil Zeuthen Svitzer, broker and captain Johan Carl Eduard Lorentzen and master timber and architect Jacob Beierholm Wenzel. Lorentzen was Jerndorff's father-in-law.

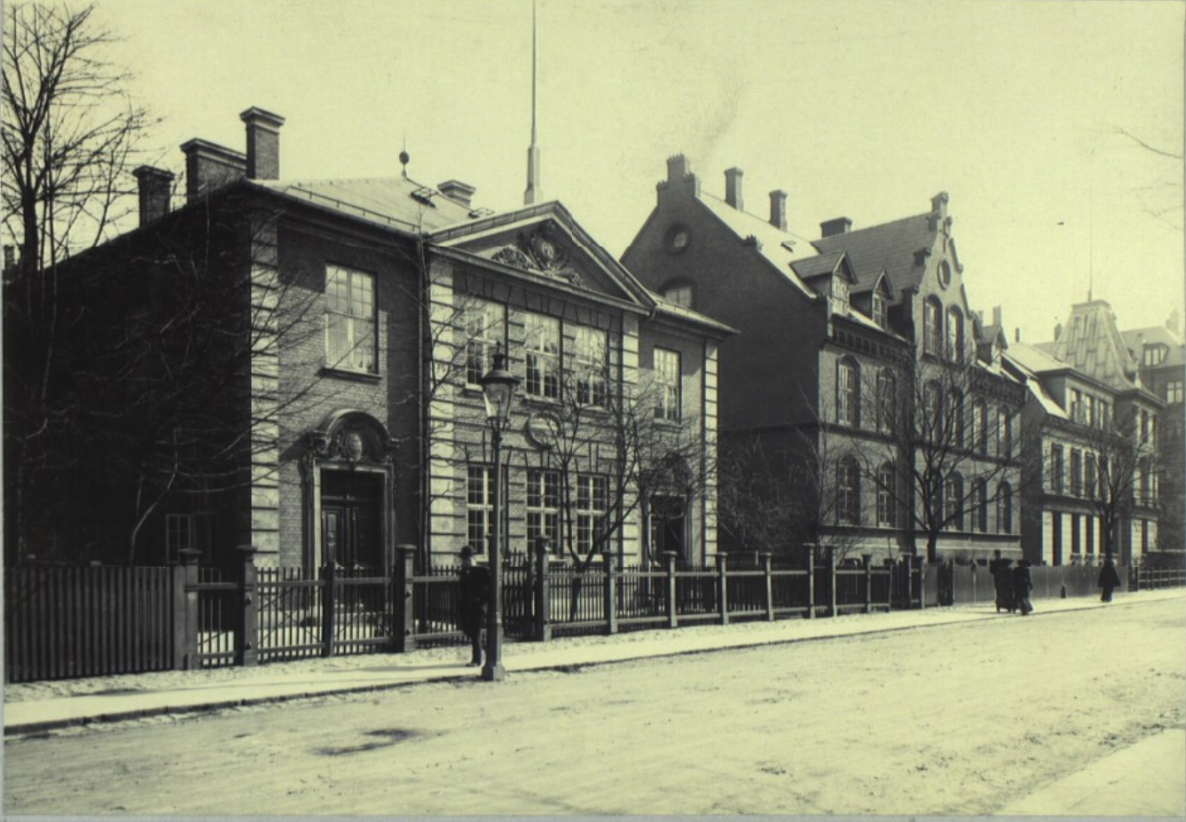
Valdemarsgade with Kong Chr. og Dr. Louises Jubilæumsasyl

Svitzer and Lorentzen demolished Kilde's house. The new street was established in 1858. Together with Dannebrogsgade and Oehlenschlægersgade, it was the first side streets of Vesterbrogade to be established. Svitzer proposed that it should be named Fortungade but the city council decided to name it Valdemarsgade after Valdemar the Great. The west side of the street was fairly soon built over with villas. The east side of the street was not built over until the second half of the 1870s.

It was only the northern end of Valdemarsgade that was built over with villas for wealthy citizens. The section south of Mathæusgade was built over with five-storey apartment blocks. A boom barrier was installed at Mathæusgade to keep the private part of the street free of through traffic.

== Notable buildings and residents ==
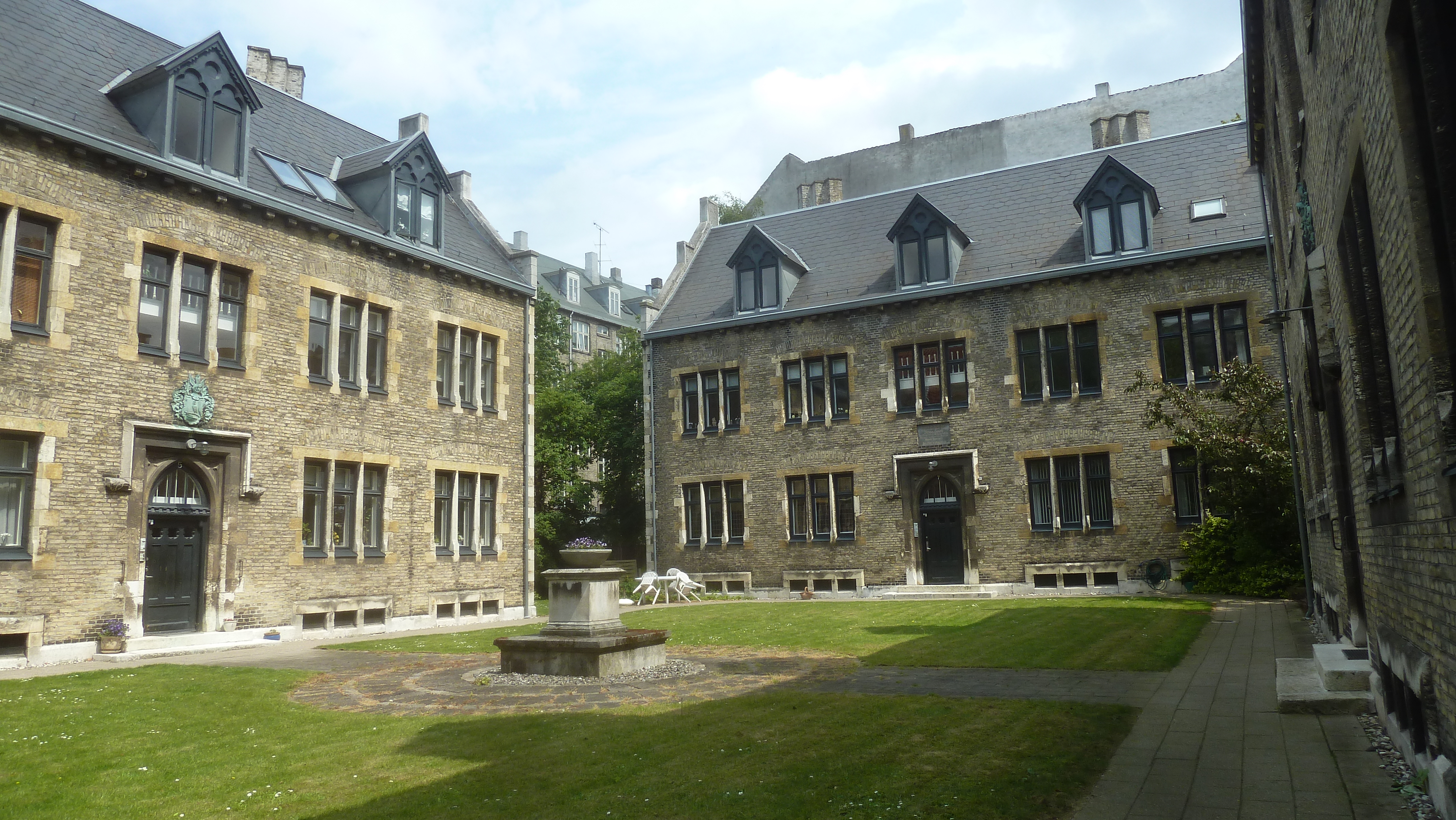
No. 5-9: De Suhrske Friboliger

Suhr's Friboliger (No. 5–9) was built in 1876–78 at the initiative of Ole Berendt Suhr to provide affordable accommodation for needy merchants and their widows. The complex was designed by Ludvig Fenger who also designed St. Mathew's Church. It consists of three detached wings surrounding a central courtyard. the Suhr family's coat of arms is seen above the door on one of the buildings. It was listed on the Danish registry of protected buildings and places in 2003.

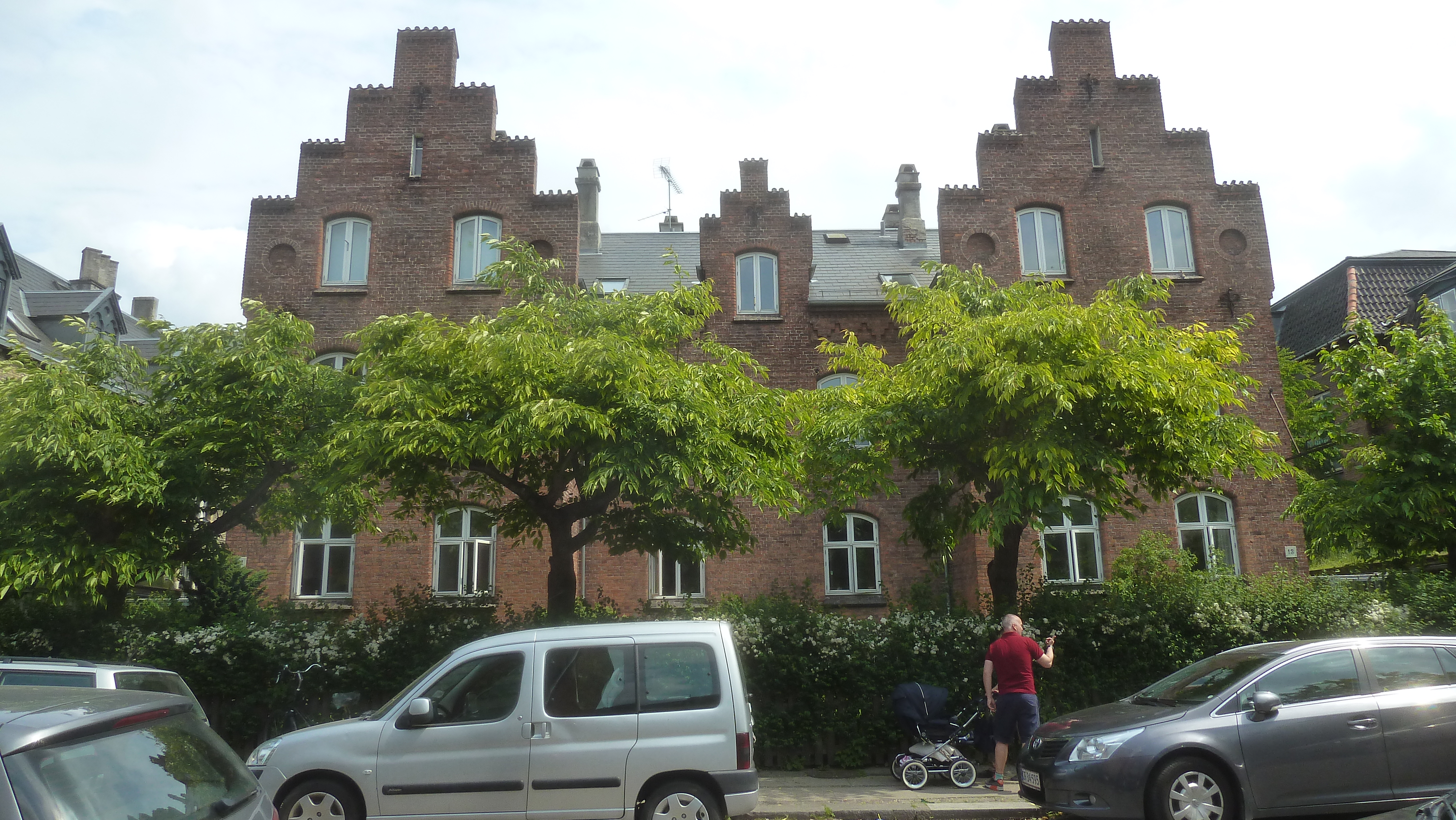
No. 11-13: Tømmerlaugets Stiftelse

Tømmerlaugets Stiftelse (No. 11–13) was built by the Carpenters' Guild in 188 0and served as dwellings for master carpenters in reduced circumstances and their dependants. The building was designed by Ludvig Vold with inspiration from Gisselfeldt. It was sold in 1922.

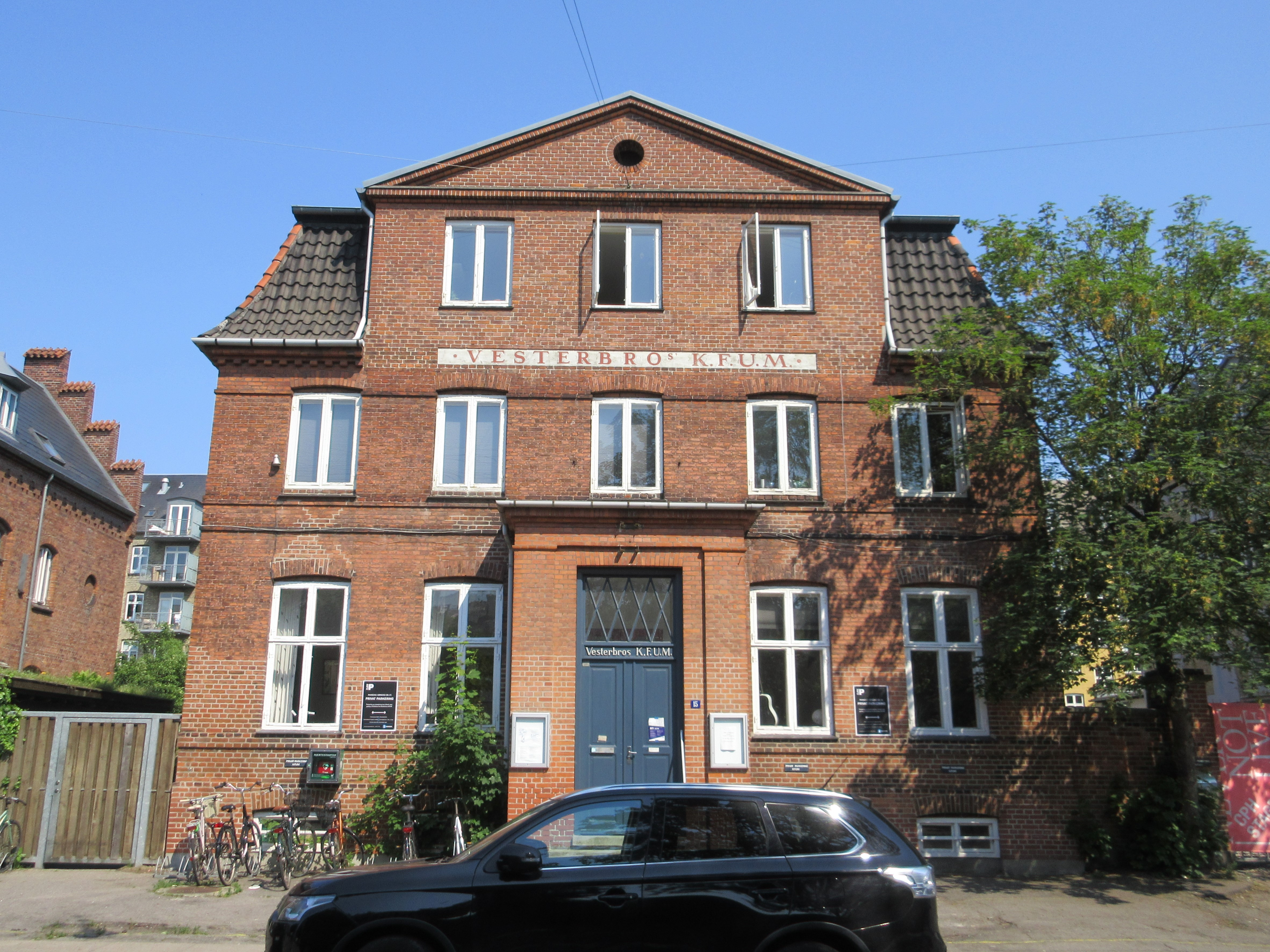
No. 15: Teatret Zepelin

No, 15 was built for Vesterbros KFUM, the local branch of the YMCA: It now houses Teatret Zeppelin, a theatre specializing in productions for children and families. No. 17 is a residential building from 1885.

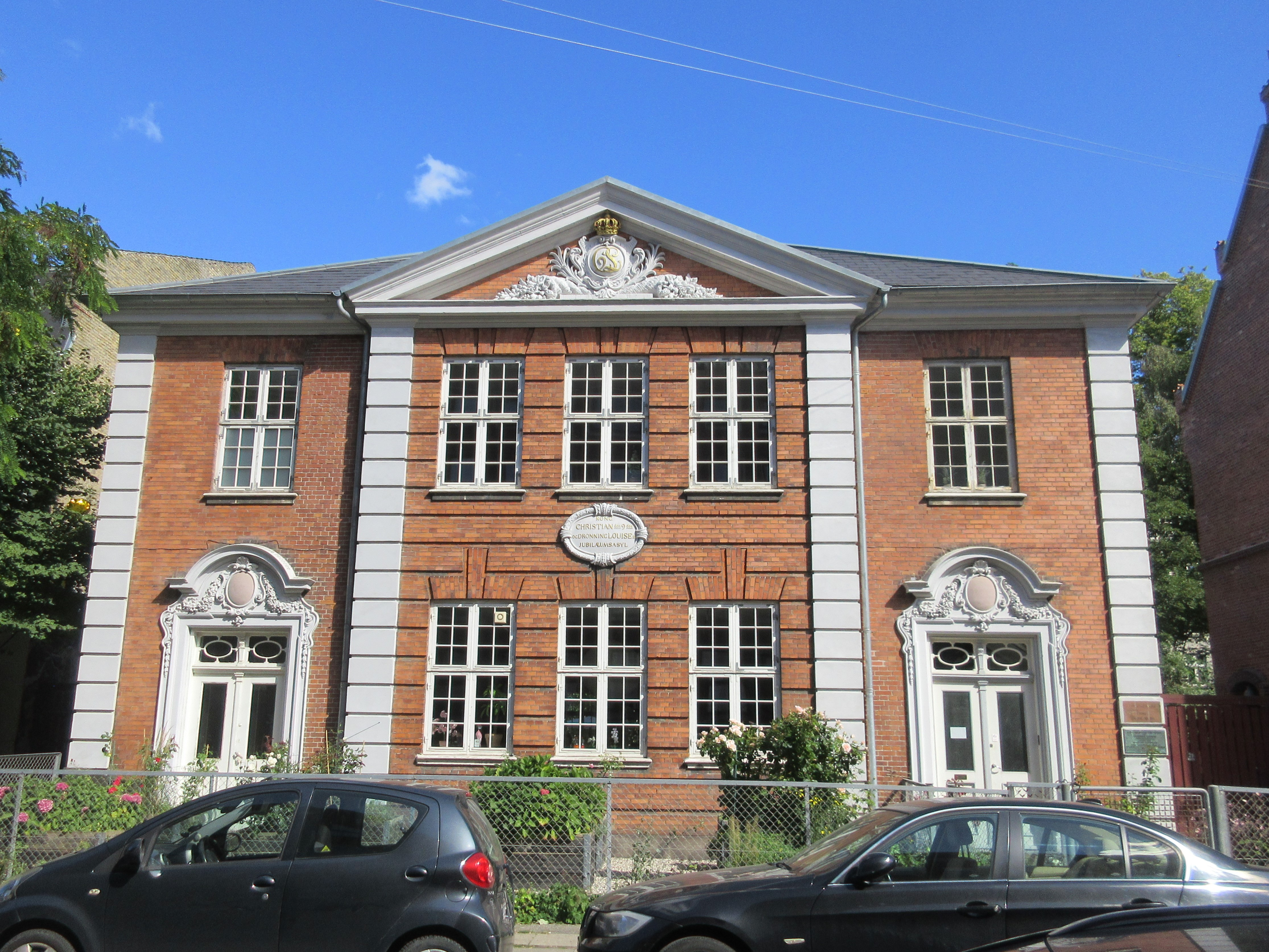
No. 21: Kong Christian IXs og Dronning Louises Jubilæumsasyl

Kong Christian IX's og Dronning Louises Jubilæumsasyl (No. 21) was founded on 16 November 1888 by the Royal Copenhagen Shooting Society. The building was inaugurated on 11 August 1894 to design by Ludvig Knudsen.

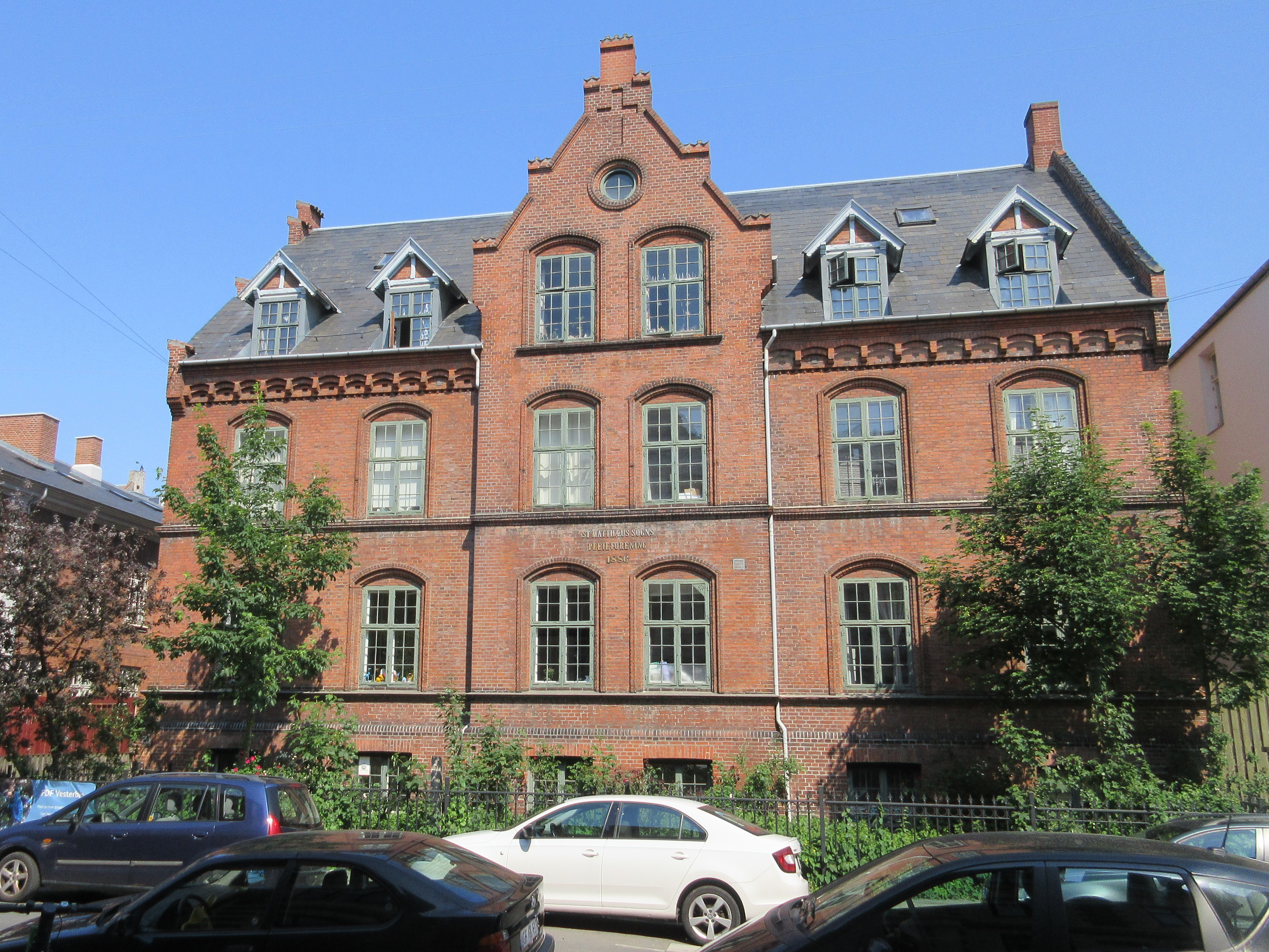
St. Matthæus Sogns Plejeforening

Børneuniversitetet (No. 14), situated on the other side of the street, is a school that practices alternative teaching methods.

== Transport ==
The nearest metro station in Enghave Plads.

== See also ==
- Viktoriagade
