= Eastern Power Station, Copenhagen =

Power station in Copenhagen

Eastern Power Plant
- Østre Elektricitetsværk
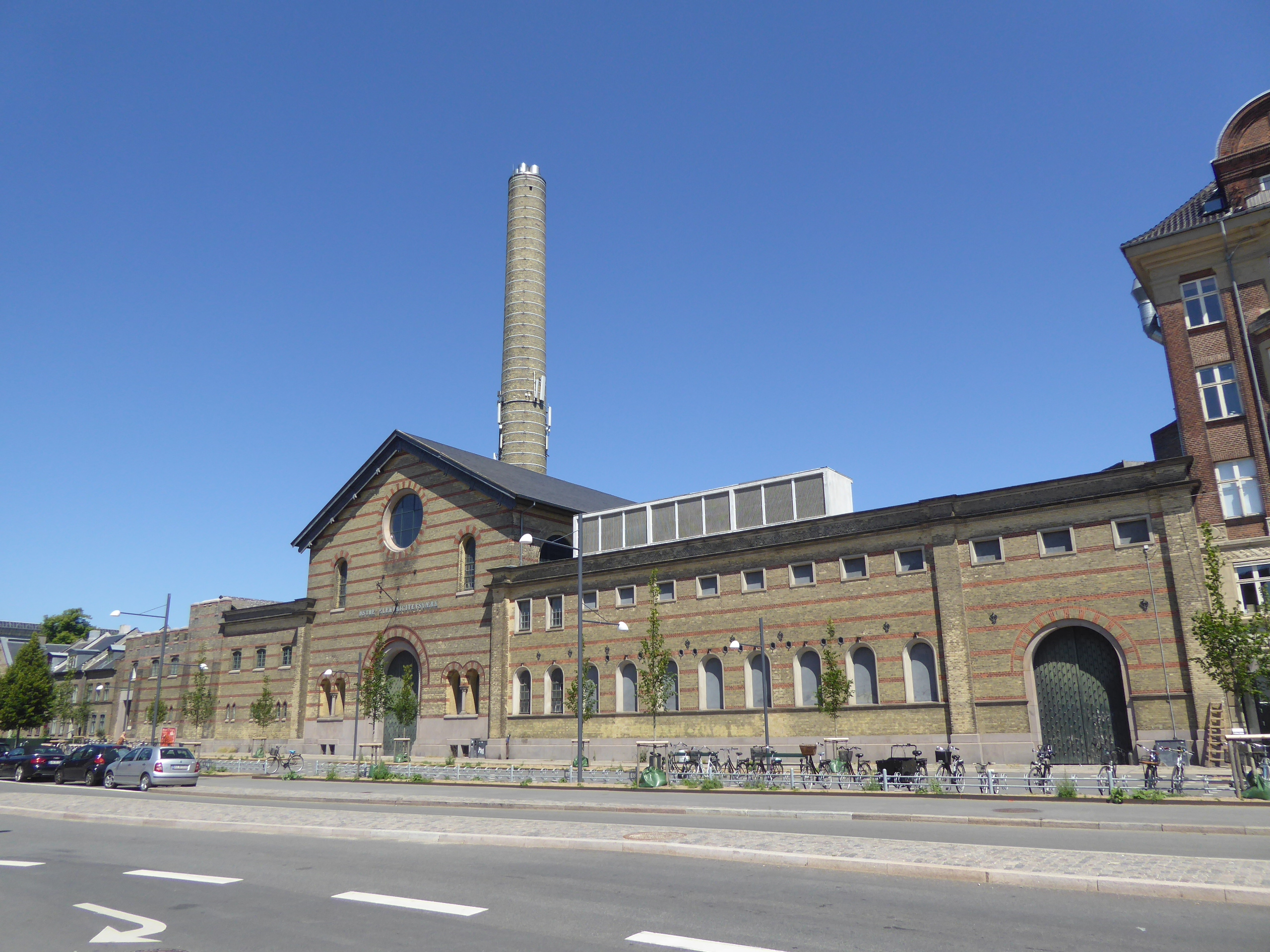
- The building in 2018

General information
- Architectural style: Historicism
- Location: Copenhagen
- Country: Denmark
- Coordinates: 55°42′0.11″N 12°34′34.14″E
- Completed: 1902
- Client: Københavns Belysningsvæsen
- Owner: Hofor

Design and construction
- Architect(s): Ludvig Fenger and Ludvig Claussen

The Eastern Power Station (Danish: Østre Elværk) is a former power station situated on Øster Allé in the Østerbro district of Copenhagen, Denmark. The building was completed in 1902 to designs by city architect Ludvig Fenger in collaboration with project architect Ludvig Claussen.

== History ==
The first power station in Copenhagen was built by Københavns Belysningsvæsen in 1892 at Gothersgade. In 1898, it was followed by the Western Power Station on Rietgensgade. It was expanded several times over the next few years to be able to supply electricity for Copenhagen Tramways.

The work with the planning of the Eastern Power Station began in 1898. It opened in 1902. The work was headed by chief engineer Carl Hentzen. It served the Østerbro area as well as Copenhagen Tramways. The power station used direct current technology which required a location close to the consumers.

== Architecture ==
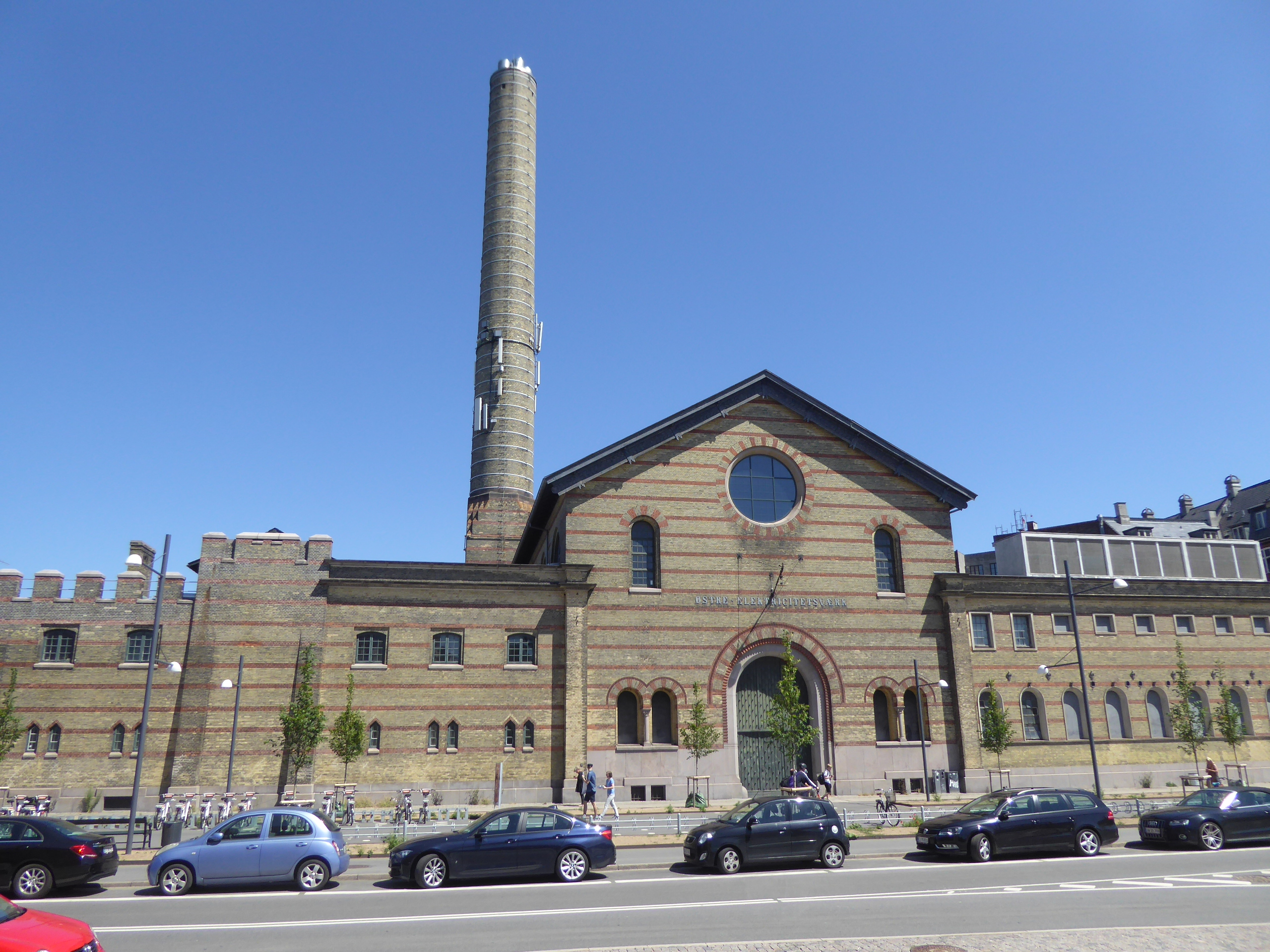
The Eastern Power Station.

The building complex is constructed in yellow brick with decorative bands of red brick. It stands on a foundation.

== Commemorative plaque ==
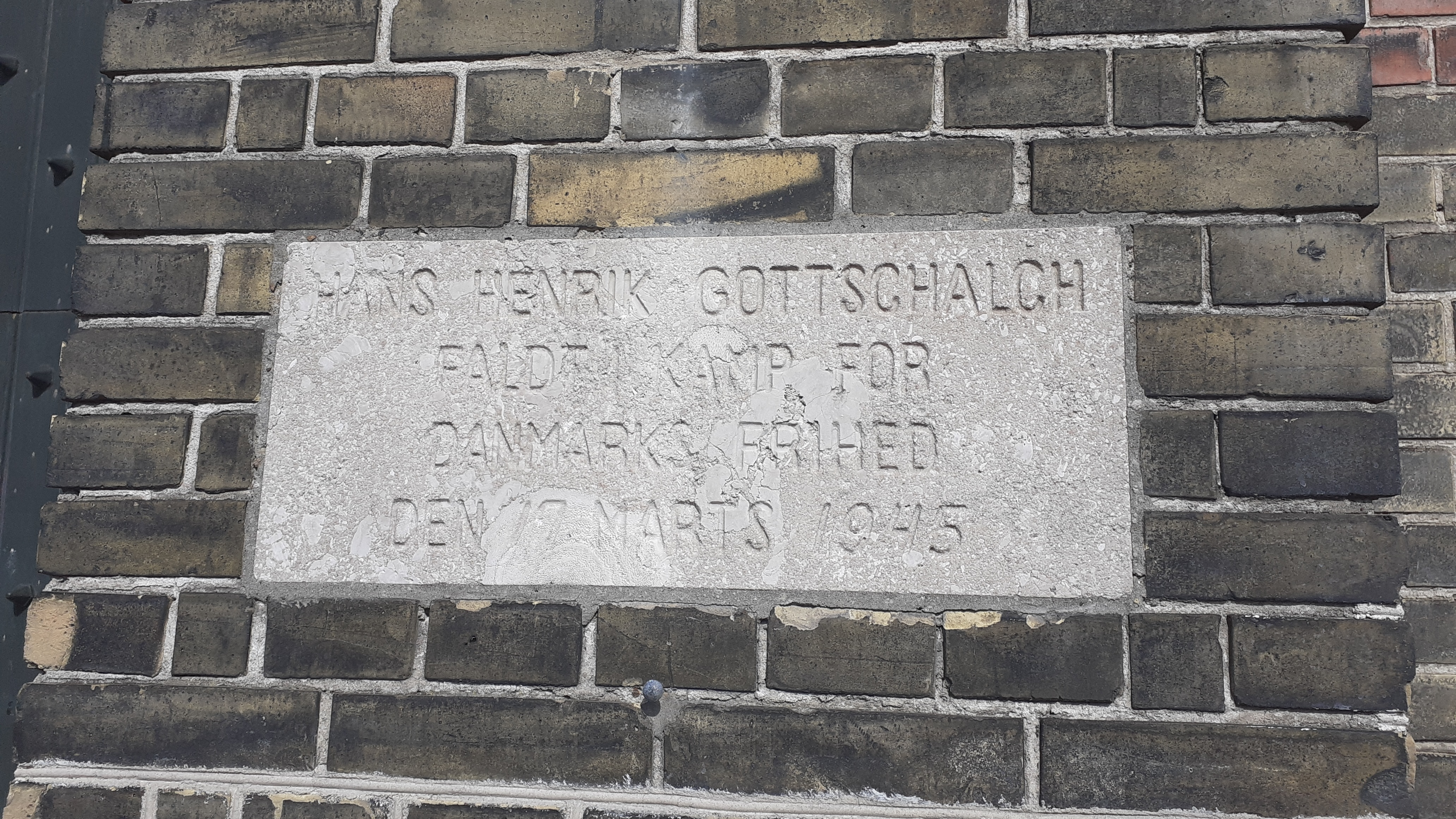
Commemorative plaque.

A plaque on the facade commemorates Hans Henrik Gottschalch|Hans Henrik Gottschalch , a member of the risistance movement during the German occupation of Denmark in World War II, who was killed by German soldiers on the site on 17 March 1945.

== Krøyer painting ==
The interior of the Eastern Power Station was selected as the location for Peder Severin Krøyer's monumental 1904 oil-on-canvas group portrait painting Men of Industry.
