= St. Matthew's Church, Copenhagen =

St. Matthew's Church
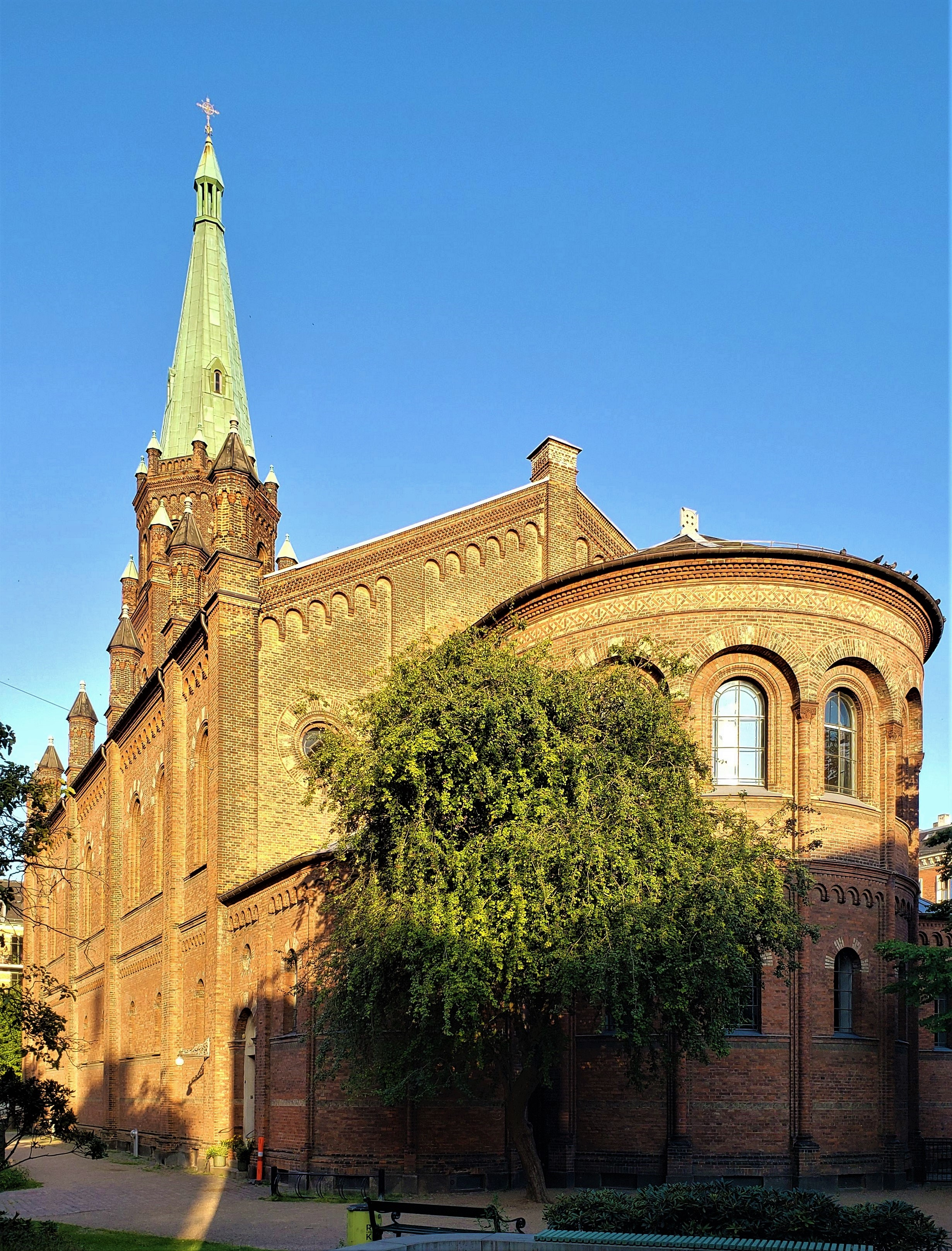
- St. Matthew's Church
- St. Matthew's Church
- 55°40′10″N 12°32′53″E
- Location: Vesterbro, Copenhagen
- Country: Denmark
- Denomination: Church of Denmark

History
- Status: Church

Architecture
- Architect: Ludvig Fenger
- Architectural type: Church
- Style: Romanesque Revival
- Groundbreaking: 1879
- Completed: 1880

Specifications
- Capacity: 1,000
- Materials: Brick

Administration
- Archdiocese: Diocese of Copenhagen

St. Mathew's Church (Danish: Sankt Mathæus Kirke) is the oldest and largest church in the Vesterbro district of Copenhagen, Denmark. It is located at the corner of Mathæusgade and Valdemarsgade and was completed in 1880 to design by city architect Ludvig Fenger.

== History ==
=== Background ===
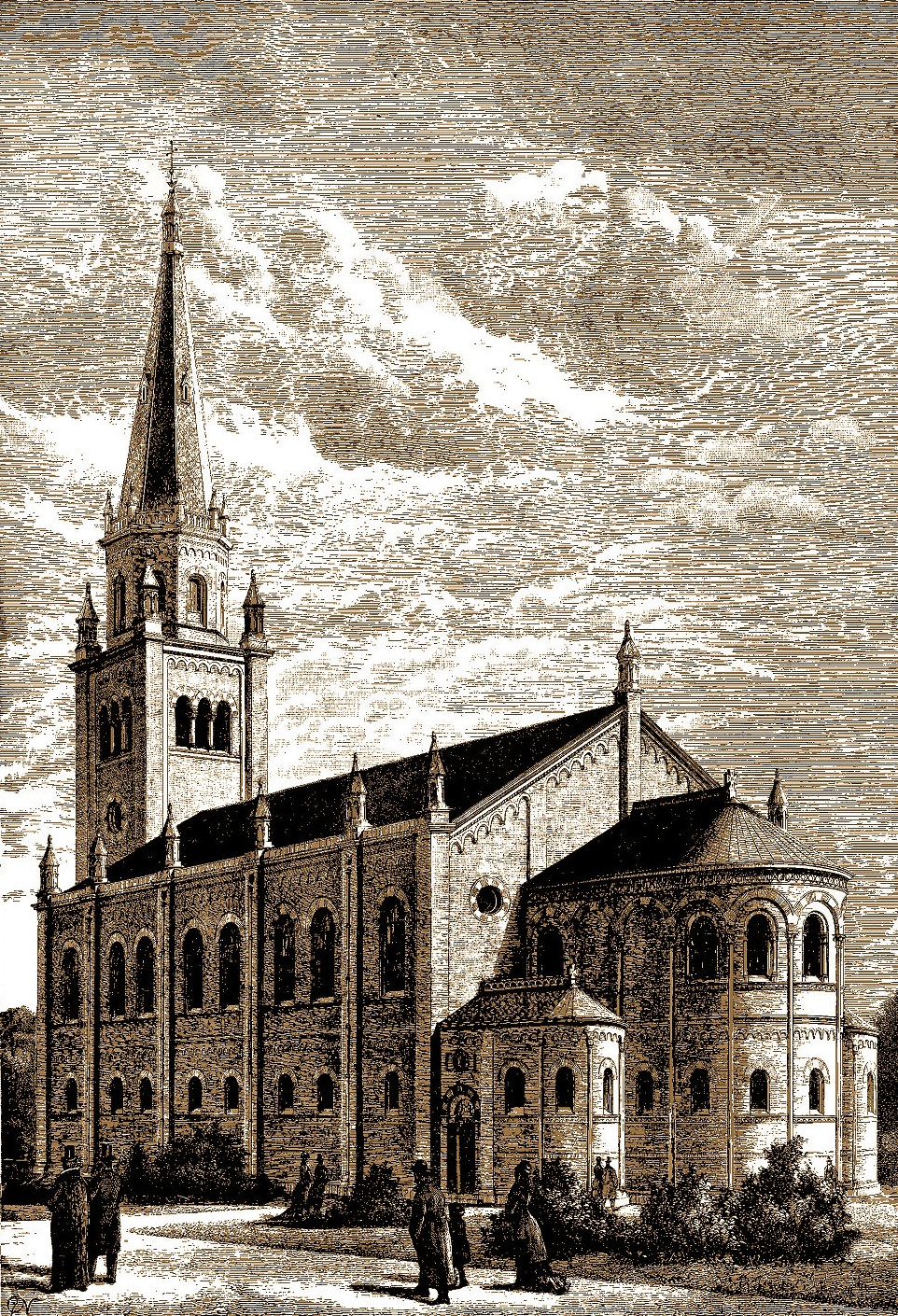
St, Mathew's Church

The decommissioning of Copenhagen's Bastioned Fortifications was a gradual and prolonged process. When a law in 1868 finally relinquished ownership of the fortifications and lifted the restrictions in the area immediately outside them, new residential districts sprang up outside the four former city gates which had been dismantled in 1868–69. This was also the case with Vesterbro outside the former Western City Gate which developed into a crowded and poor working-class neighbourhood.

=== Construction ===
Constructed between 1879 and 1880, St. Matthew's Church was the first church to be built in the area. At that time the parish had around 2,000 inhabitants. Its architect was Ludvig Fenger who had just completed St. James' Church in Østerbro. The building was constructed by master mason Vilhelm Køhler (1839-1802).

=== Later history ===
Up until the mid-1890s, St. Matthew's remained the only church in Vesterbro. At the turn of the 20th century the population had grown to about 7,000.

== Architecture ==
Like many other Danish buildings of its time, St. Matthew's Church is inspired by North Italian Romanesque brick architecture.

A distinctive feature of the exterior is the many pinnacles along the eaves as well as on the corners of the tower and at the base of the spire.

== Interior ==
Most of the inventory is designed by Ludvig Fenger, including the organ case. The organ works were created by A. H. Busch & Sønner in 1880. The altarpiece is a mural painted directly on the wall behind the altar by Henrik Olrik depicting the Sermon on the Mount.

== Gallery ==
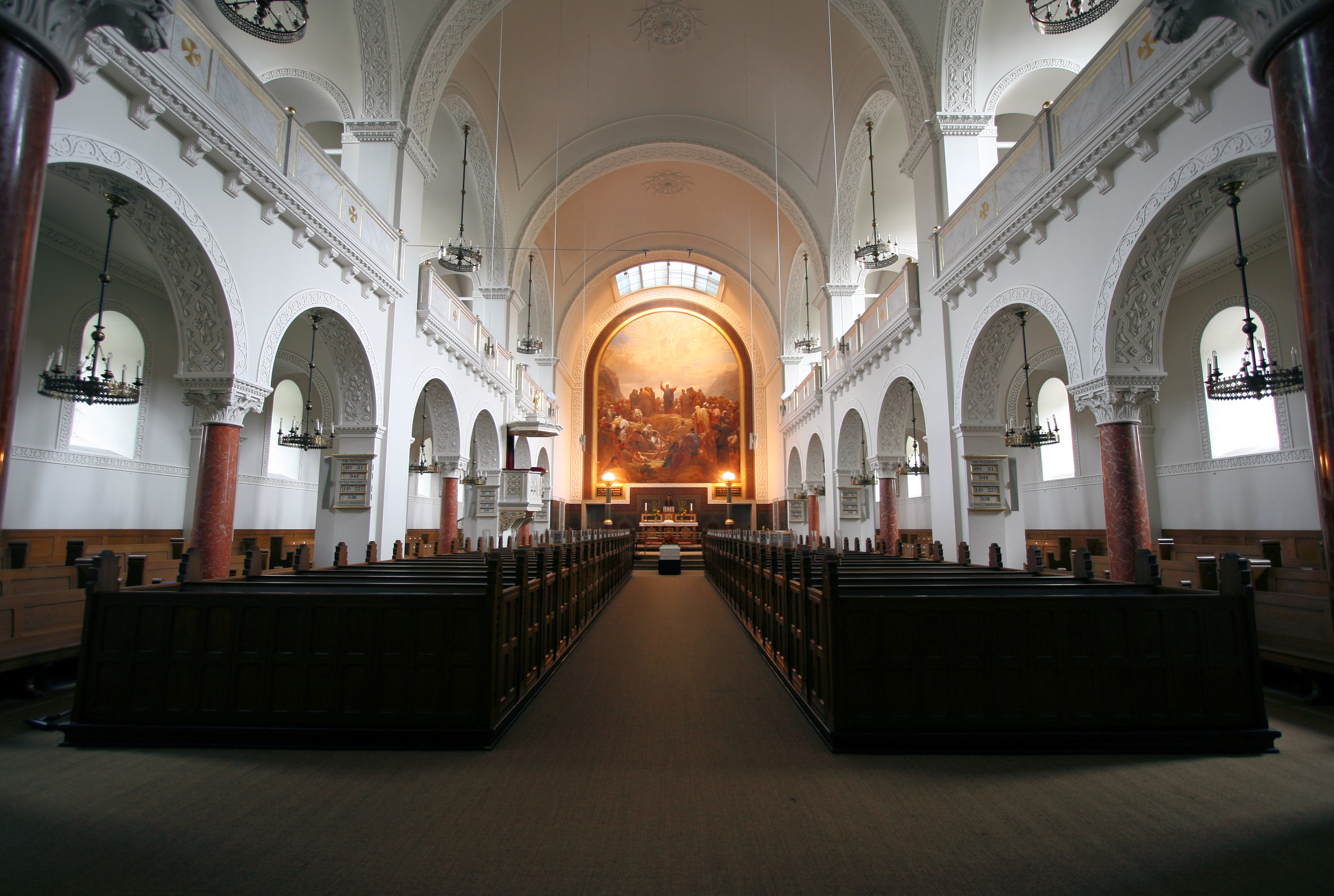
Interior

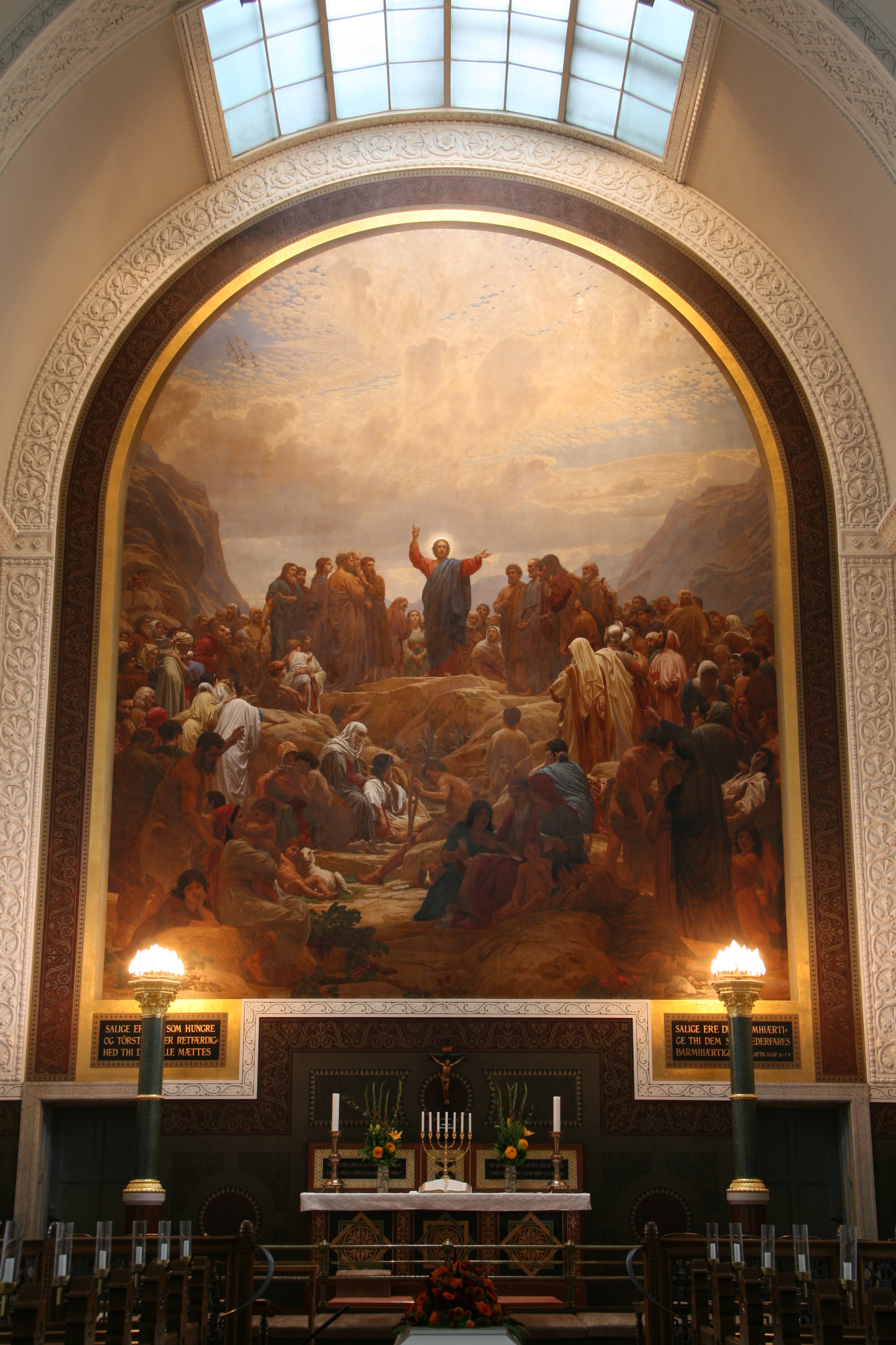
Altar and Altarpiece, full view

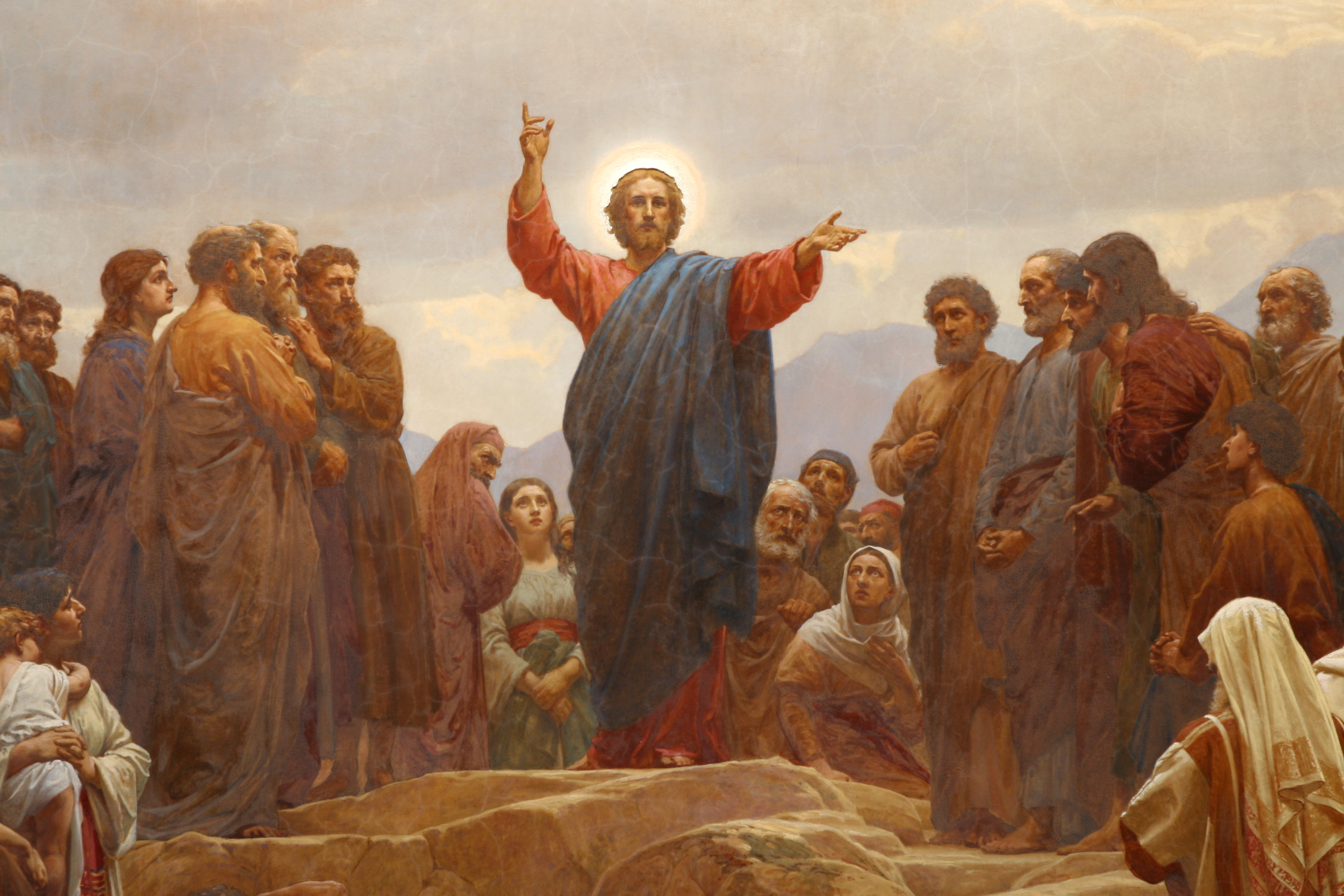
Altarpiece

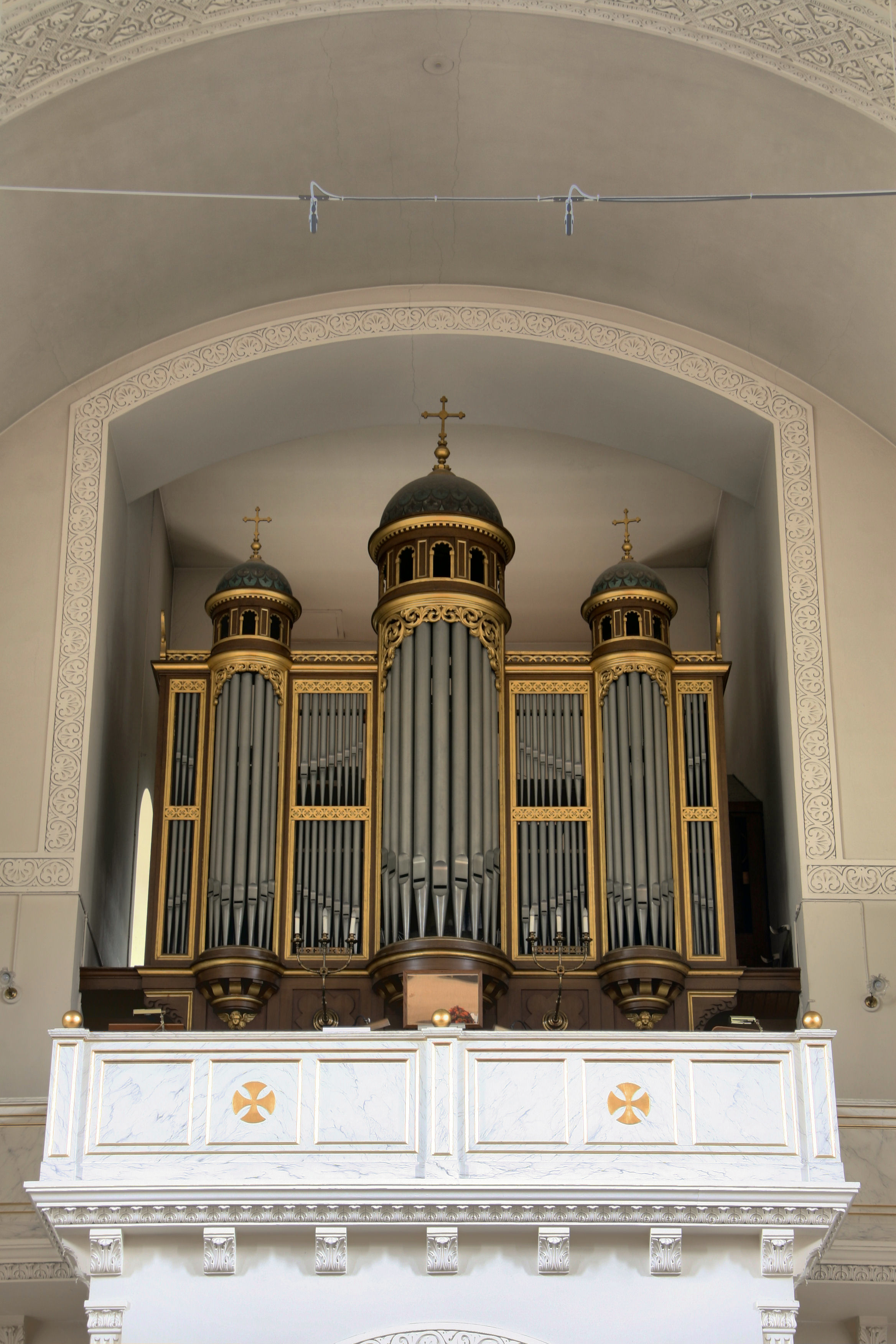
Organ

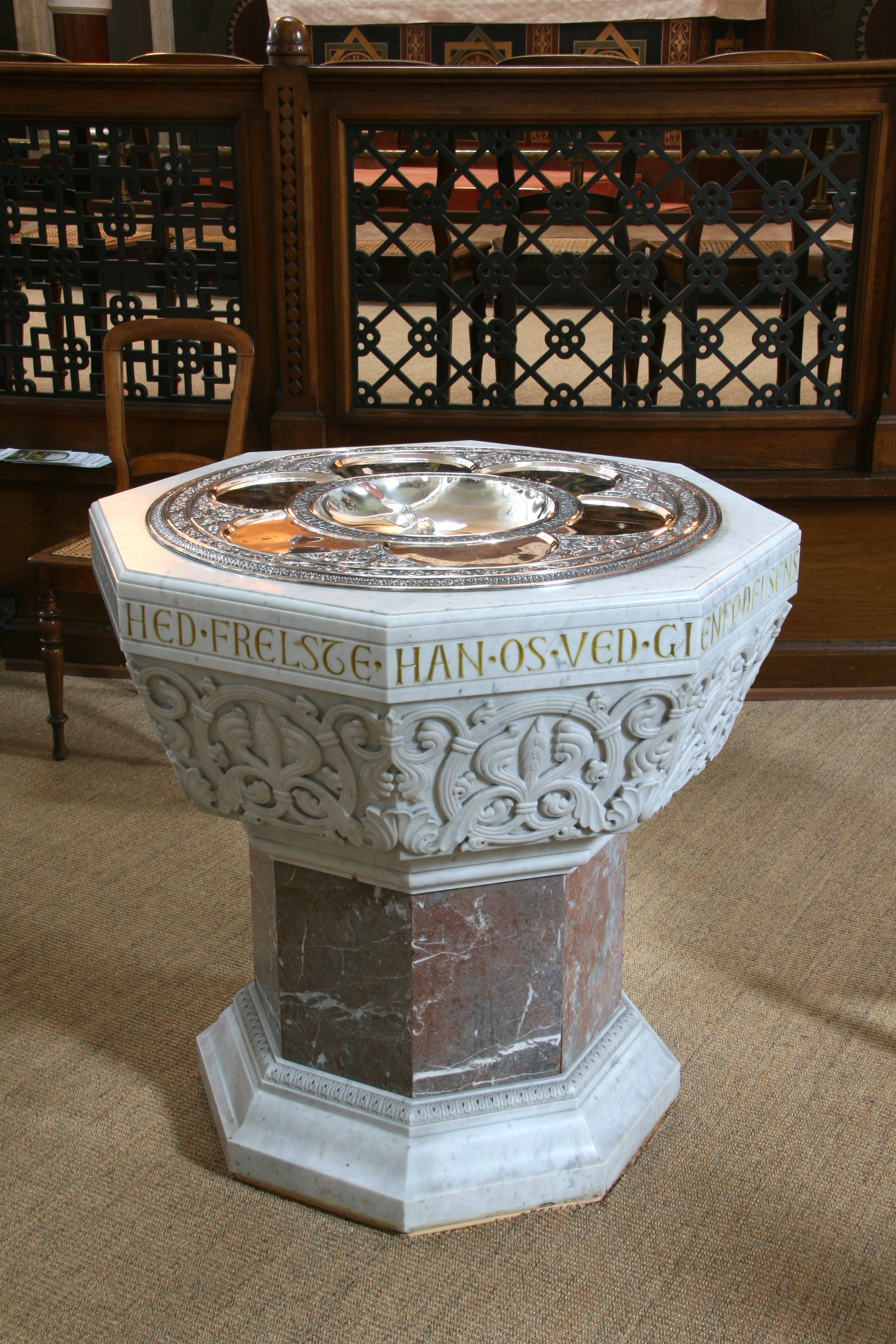
Font

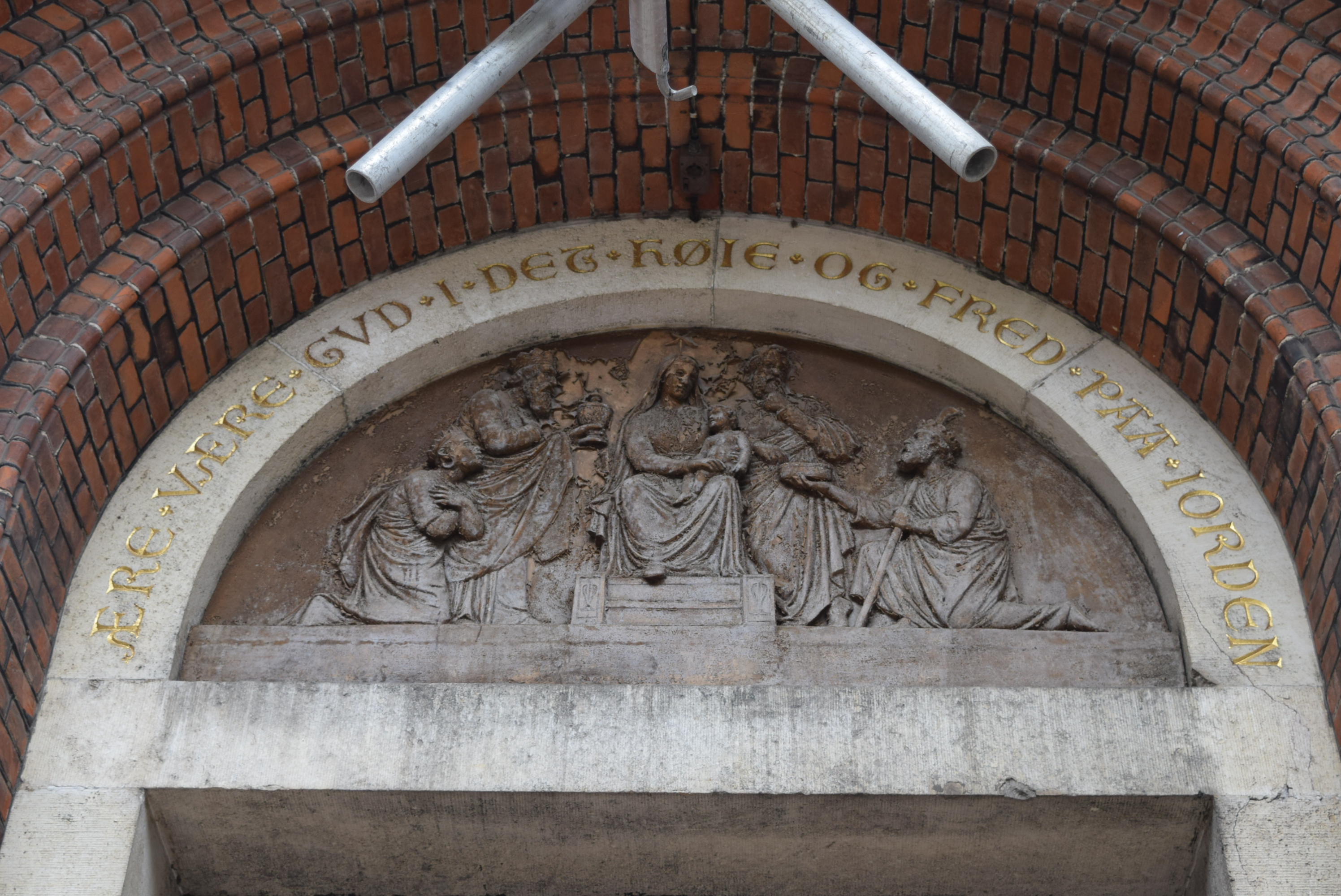

== See also ==
- St. John's Church, Copenhagen
- Jesus Church, Valby
