= Tømmerlaugets Stiftelse =

Building in Copenhagen, Denmark

Coordinates: 55°40′16″N 12°32′56″E

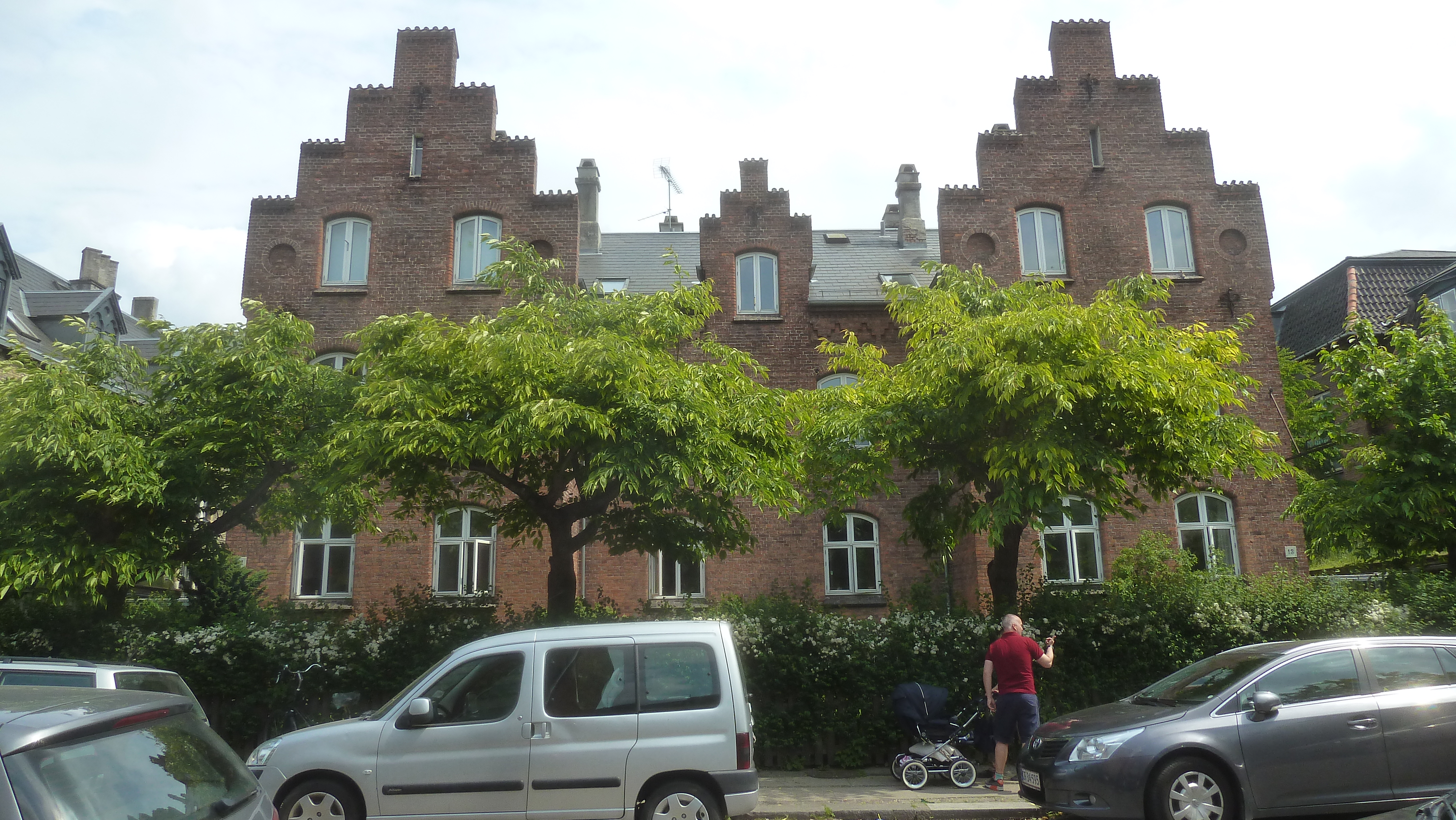
Tømmerlaugets Stiftelse

Tømmerlaugets Stiftelse is a historical building located at Valdemarsgade 11–13 in the Vesterbro district of Copenhagen, Denmark. It was built in 1880 to a design by Ludvig Vold, with inspiration from Gisselfeld, a 16th-century manor house. It was built by the Copenhagen Carpenter's Guild and served as dwellings for master carpenters in reduced circumstances and their dependants until 1922.

== History ==
Tømmerlaugets Stiftelse was built at the initiative of Lieutenant Jens Christian Jørgensen, who served as statutory auditor of the Carpenters' Guild. It was adopted at the guild's annual general meeting on 15 November 1876. The guild purchased a lot on the east side of Valdemarsgade from Svitzer & Lorentzen in 1879, and the architect Ludvig Vold was commissioned to design the building.

The Carpenters' Guild sold the building to Willy Michael Gottlieb Hoppe on 10 July 1922. He operated his plumbing business from the ground floor and rented out the apartments on the other floors. His widow sold the building to Carl Lindhardt in 1975.

== Architecture ==
Tømmerlaugets Stiftelse is built to a Historicist design with inspiration from Gisselfeld (Vold had worked for Johan Daniel Herholdt on the renovation of Gisselfeld's main building in 1870). It is built in red brick and has crow-stepped gables and arched windows. The building has an H-shaped floor plan. The two staircases are placed in the two side wings.
