= Carl Hentzen =

Danish engineer

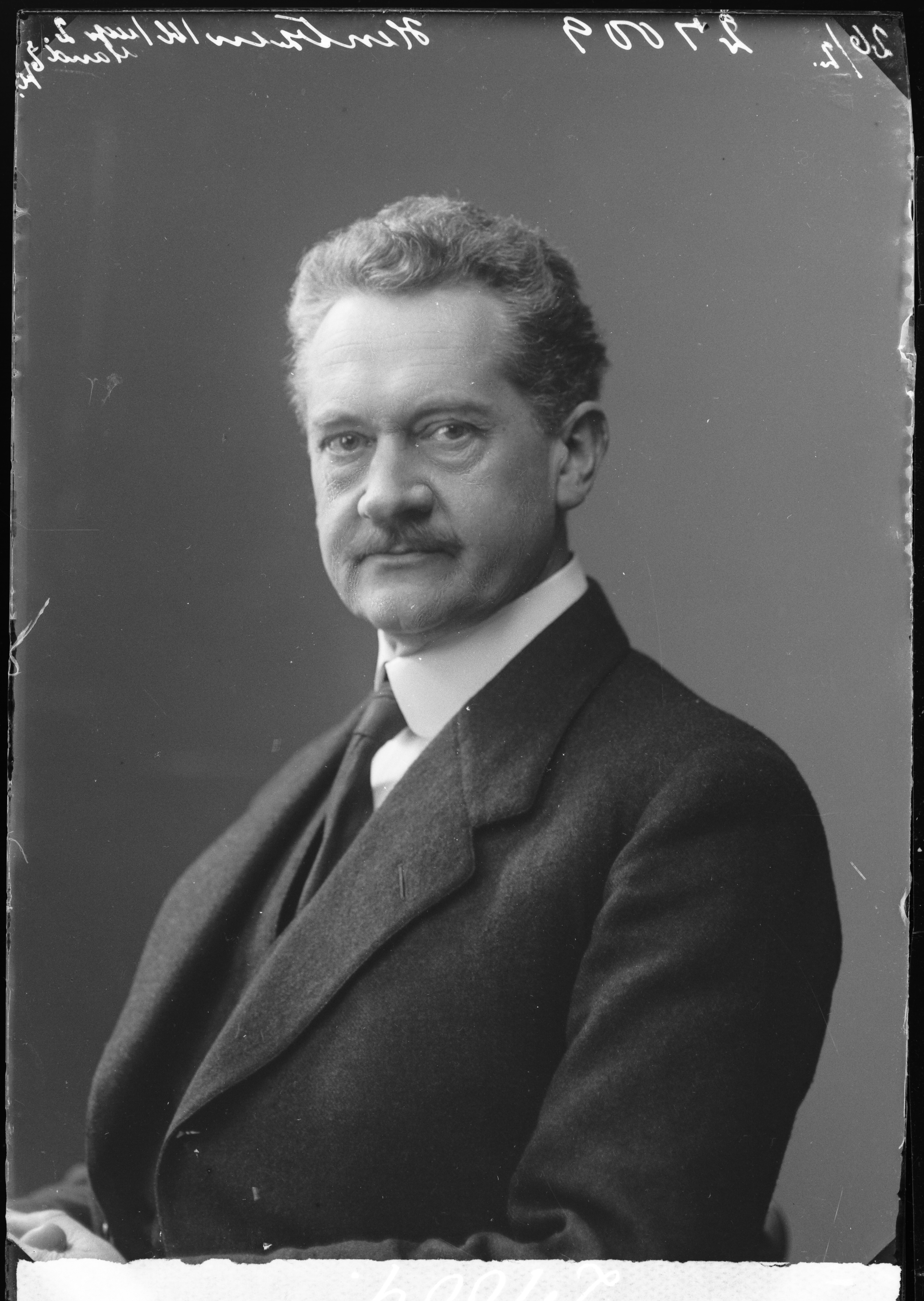
Carl Hentzen photographed by Peter Elfelt.

Carl Johan Wilhelm Hentzen (1 November 1863 - 14 November 1937) was a Danish engineer who worked for Københavns Belysningsvæsen. He played a key role in the planning of Copenhagen Western and Rastern Power Stations.

== Early life and education ==
Hentzen was born on 1 November 1863 in Copenhagen, the son of master baker Johan Wilhelm H. (1832–1917) and Caroline Broch (1825–1914). He completed his secondary schooling in 1879 and earned his engineering exam from the College of Advanced Technology in 1885. In the following year, he continued his education abroad, studying electrical engineering in Germany and England.

== Career ==
Hentzen's first employment was at DSB's workshops in Aarhus. In 1888, he returned to Copenhagen to work for Københavns Belysningsvæsen. He participated in the planning of the city's first electrical power station at the corner of Gothersgade and Adelgade. After he was first as its deputy manager (1892) and then as chief operator (1896). He subsequently headed the construction of the western and eastern power stations. The Western Power Station was completed at the corner of Tietgensgade and Bernstoffsgade in 1899. It was followed by the Eastern Power Station in 1902.

In 1914, Hentzen was appointed as Chief operating officer (from In 1916 with title of chief engineer) of all the power stations in Copenhagen.

In 1916–23, he headed the construction of the two first stages of the H. C. Ørsted Power Station in the Southern Docklands. The power station was designed by Louis Hygom. Hentzen was also involved in the construction of expansion of a number of power stations in other parts of the country. In the years after 1895, he provided Niels Finsen with technical assistance in his medical research.

Hentzen was a board member of A/S Københavns Telefonautomater from 1898. In 1908, he became a member of the Danish chapter of the International Electro-Rechnical Committee. In 1907–13, he was a board member of Elektroteknisk Forening, In 1912–16, he was chairman of Copenhagen's Municipal Association of Engineers. In1910–14, he was a member of the board of representatives of the Vereinigung der Elektricitätswerke (honorary member in 1929). From 1925, he was a member of the Danish chapter of the World Power Conference.

He retired from the position as chief engineer of Københavns Belysningsvæsen in 1929. In 1933, he published his memoirs as 40 Aar i Københavnss Elektricitetsværkers Tjeneste.

== Personal life ==
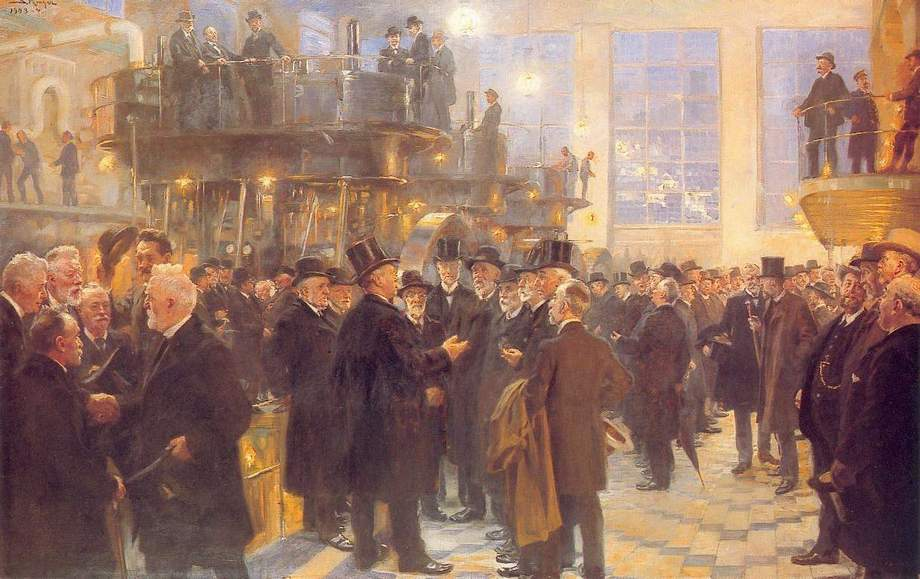
P. S. Krøyer: Men of Industry.

On 3 March 1896, Hentzen was married to Alma Marie Vilhelmine Therkelsen (18551914). She was a daughter of royal carriage master Carl Frederik Ferdinand Therkelsen (1839–1914) and Nielsine Vilhelmine Emilie Mortensen (1839–80). On 24 June 1916, Hentzen married secondly to Jenny Marie Hatting (1877-1951). She was a daughter of businessman Jens Jensen Hatting (1850–1934) and Mathilde Peteria Nielsen (1856–1924).

Hentzen is one of the men seen in Peder Severin Krøyer's monumental 1904 oil-on-canvas group portrait painting Men of Industry. He was created a Knight of the Order of the Dannebrog in 1923. He was awarded the Order of the Dannebrog's Cross of Gonour in 1929.

Hentzen died on 14 November 1937. He is buried in Frederiksberg Old Cemetery.
