= Ludvig Fenger =

Danish architect

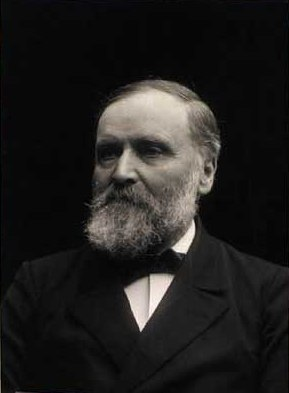
- Born: 7 July 1833; Slots Bjergby, Denmark
- Died: 9 March 1905 (aged 71)
- Resting place: Vestre Cemetery (Copenhagen)
- Occupation: Architect
- Buildings: St. Mathew's Church; Copenhagen Central Fire Station; Vestre Prison

Signature
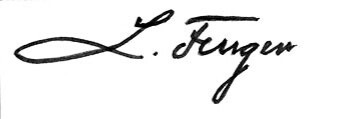

Ludvig Peter Fenger (7 July 1833 – 9 March 1905) was a Danish architect. He was a proponent of the Historicist style, and from 1886 to 1904 he held the title of City Architect in Copenhagen.

Among his works are several churches, the Central Fire Station and Vestre Prison in Copenhagen. He also directed the renovations of Church of Holmen and Christian IV's Stock Exchange.

== Early life and education ==
Ludvig Fenger was born on 7 July 1833 in the village of Slots Bjergby outside Slagelse, the son of Peter Andreas Fenger and Louise Augusta Manthey. His father was the local pastor. His paternal grandfather was the theologian Rasmus Fenger. His maternal grandrfather was the pharmacist and landowner Ludvig Manthey. Fenger graduated from Slagelse Latin School. After that he attended the Royal Danish Academy while also working for architects such as Gottlieb Bindesbøll, Christian Hansen and Ferdinand Meldahl. He won the Academy's Large Gold Medal in 1866 and went on several journeys abroad from 1867 to 1869. He participated in the Second Schleswig War against Germany, was wounded and became a prisoner of war.

== Career ==
In 1871 Fenger became a member of the Academy and in 1880 he was made a professor. From 1886 he was a corresponding member of the Royal Institute of British Architects.

In 1885 he entered local politics when he became a member of the Copenhagen City Council (Danish: Borgerrepræsentationen) in Copenhagen, a post he left when he was appointed City Architect the following year.

== Personal life ==
Fenger married on 3 July 1872 in the Church of Our Saviour Augusta Theodora Fenger (1839-1914), daughter of vicar Johannes Ferdinand Fenger (1805-61) and Marie Magdalene Boesen (1809-72).

He was created a Knight in the Order of the Dannebrog in 1890 and was awarded the Cross of Honour in 1897. He died on 9 March 1905 and is buried in Copenhagen's Western Cemetery.

== Selected works ==
- Laboratory building, Lund University, Lund, Sweden (1860)
- Royal Mint, Copenhagen (1873, with Ferdinand Meldahl)
- Rynkevang Manor, Kalundborg (1874)
- Frederik VII's Tower, Himmelbjerget (1875)
- Tiselholt Manor, Svendborg (1874–1876)
- St. James' Church, Østerbro, Copenhagen (1876–1878)
- St. Matthew's Church, Vesterbro, Copenhagen (1878–1880)
- Queen Louise's Children's Hospital, Øster Farimagsgade, Copenhagen (1889-1879, 1880-82)
- Stege Sugar Factory, Stege (1883–1885)
- St. Alban's Church, Copenhagen (1885–1887, to the design of Arthur Blomfield)
- Copenhagen Central Fire Station, Copenhagen (1889–1892)
- Vestre Prison, Copenhagen (1892–1895)
- Western Power Station, Copenhagen(1896–1898)
- Øksnehallen, the Copenhagen Meatpacking District, Copenhagen (1901)
- Eastern Power Station, Øster Allé, Copenhagen (1902)
- Holmens Cemetery Chapel, Holmens Cemetery, Copenhagen (1902)

== Writings ==
- Fenger, Ludvig (1886). Dorische Polychromie. Untersuchungen über die Anwendung der Farbe auf dem dorischen Tempel. Berlin.

== Gallery ==
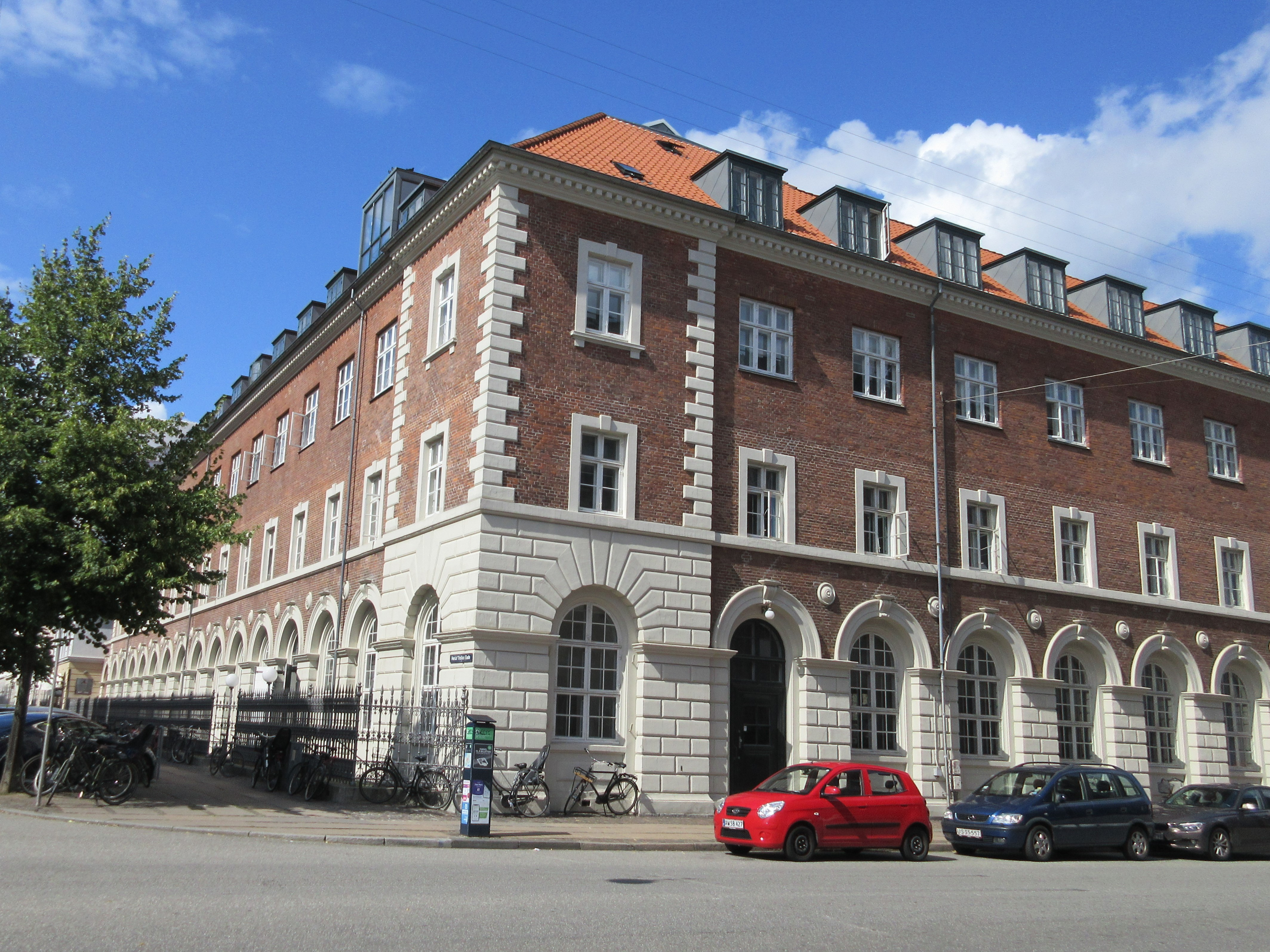
Royal Mint, Gammelholm (1873)

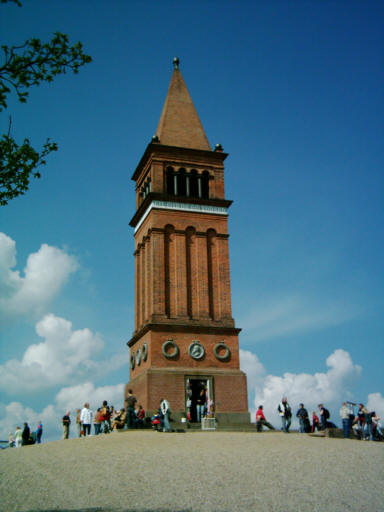
Frederik VII's Tower, Himmelbjerget (1875)

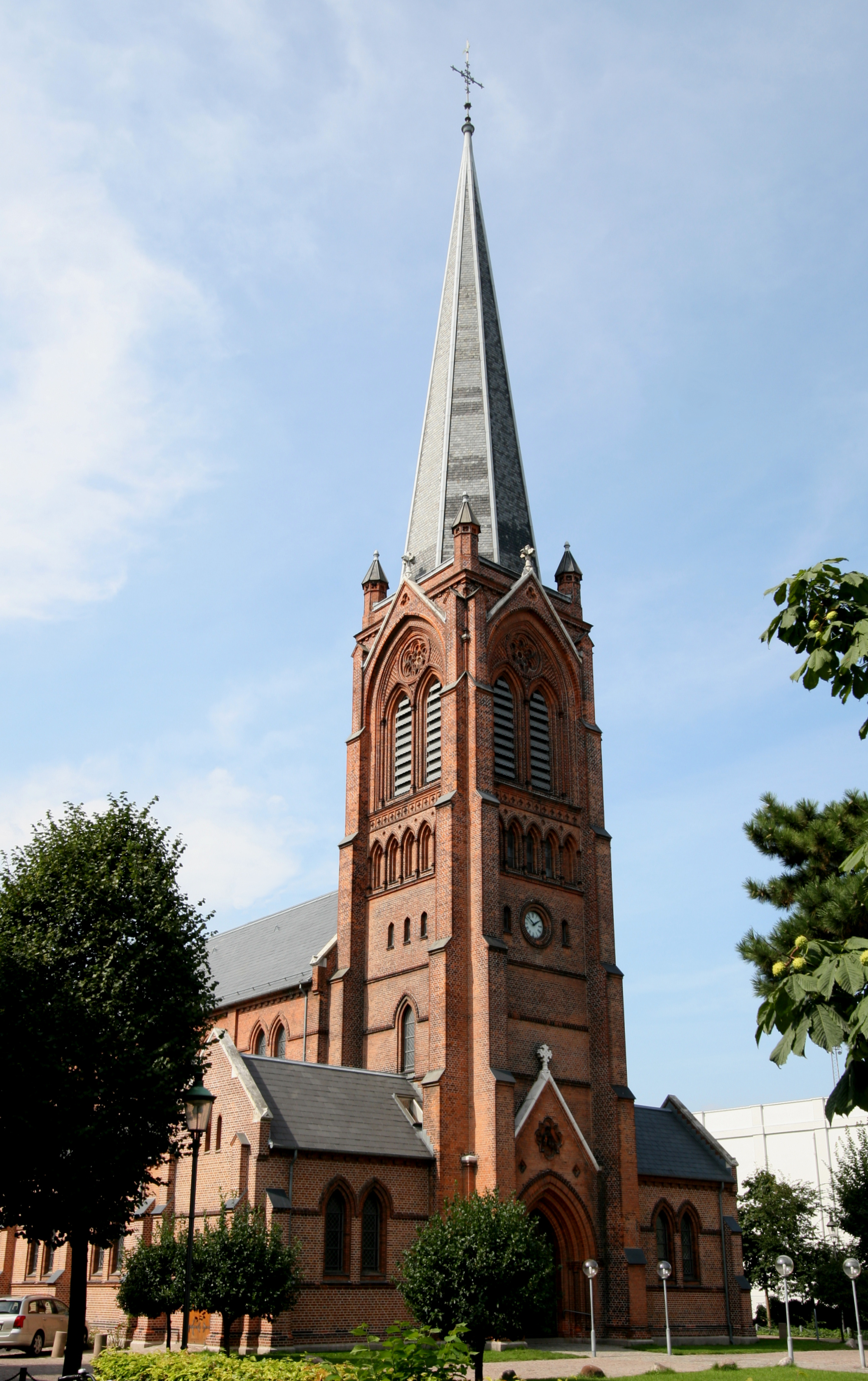
St. James' Church, Copenhagen (1878)

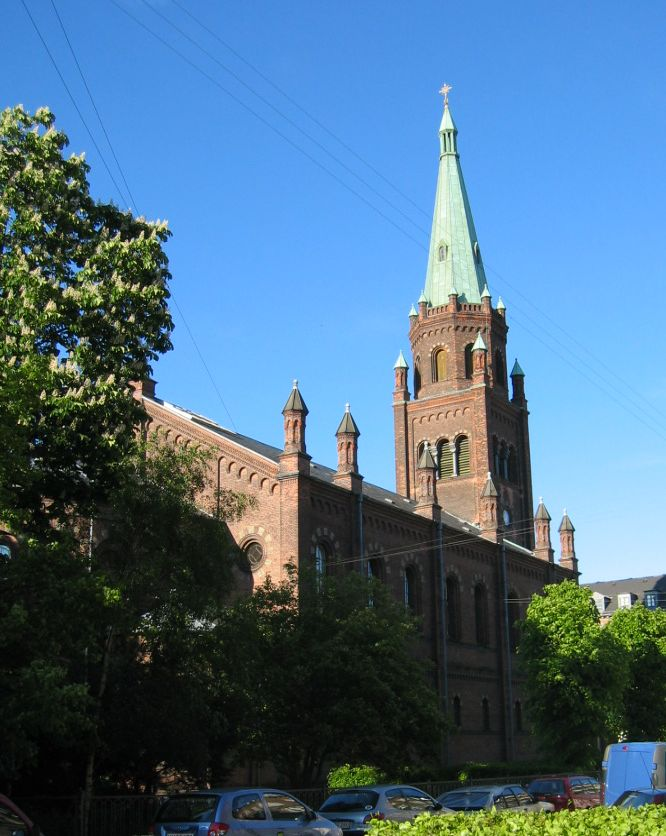
St. Matthew's Church, Copenhagen (1880)

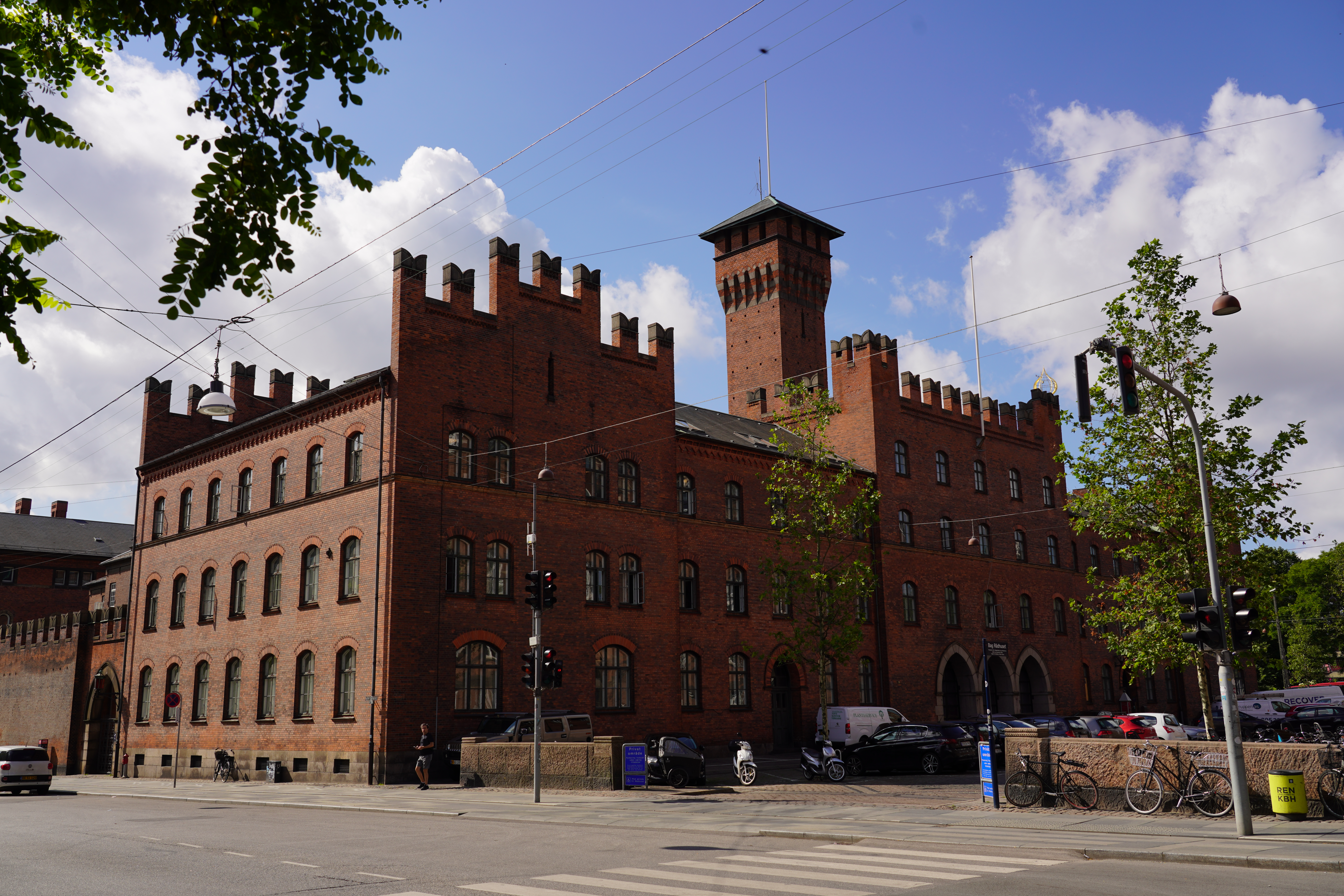
Øksnehallen, Copenhagen (1901)

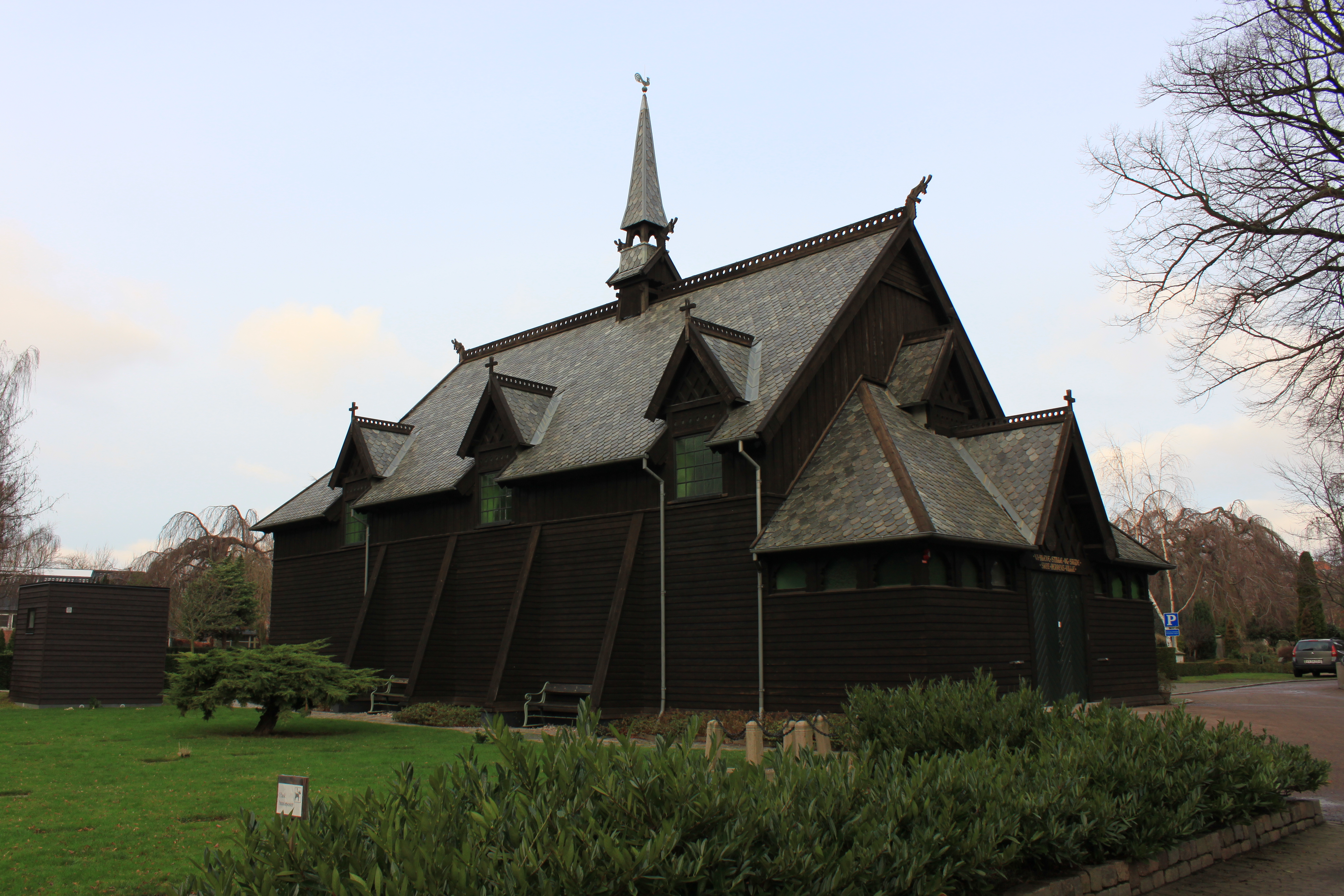
Holmens Cemetery Chapel, Copenhagen (1902)

== See also ==
- Architecture of Denmark
- Source
