= Western Power Station, Copenhagen =

Western Power Plant
- Vestre Elektricitetsværk
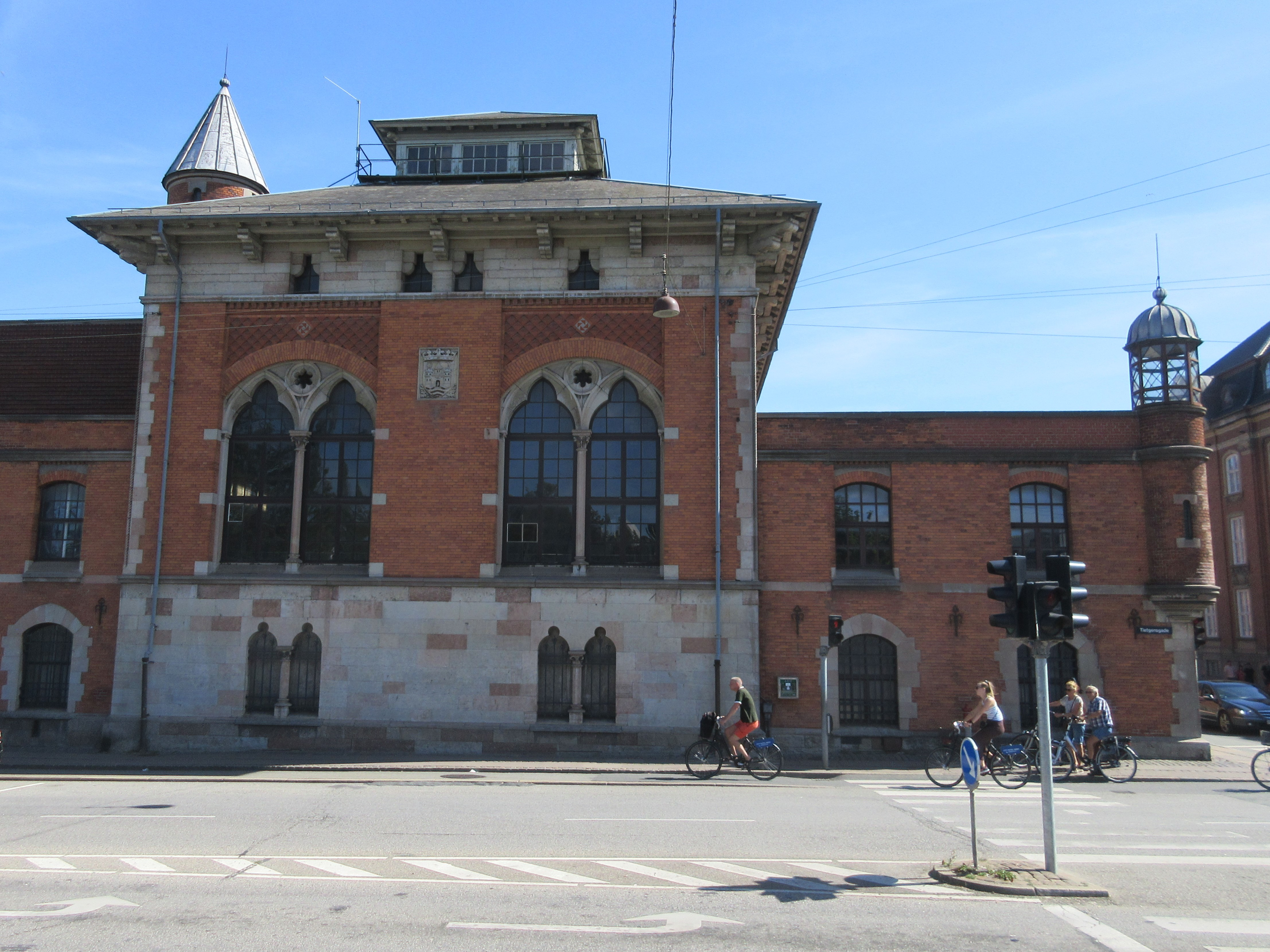
- The building in 2018
- Interactive map of the Western Power Plant area

General information
- Architectural style: Neoclassical
- Location: Copenhagen, Denmark
- Coordinates: 55°40′18.0″N 12°34′06.1″E
- Construction started: 1896
- Completed: 1898
- Client: Københavns Belysningsvæsen
- Owner: Hofor

Design and construction
- Architects: Ludvig Fenger and Ludvig Claussen

The Western Power Station (Danish: Vestre Elektricitets Værk) is a former power station located at the corner of Tietgensgade and Bernstorffsgade in central Copenhagen, Denmark. It was constructed between 1896 and 1898. It to designs by city architect Ludvig Fenger in collaboration with project architect Ludvig Claussen. It has now been converted into a distant cooling facility by Hofor.

== History ==
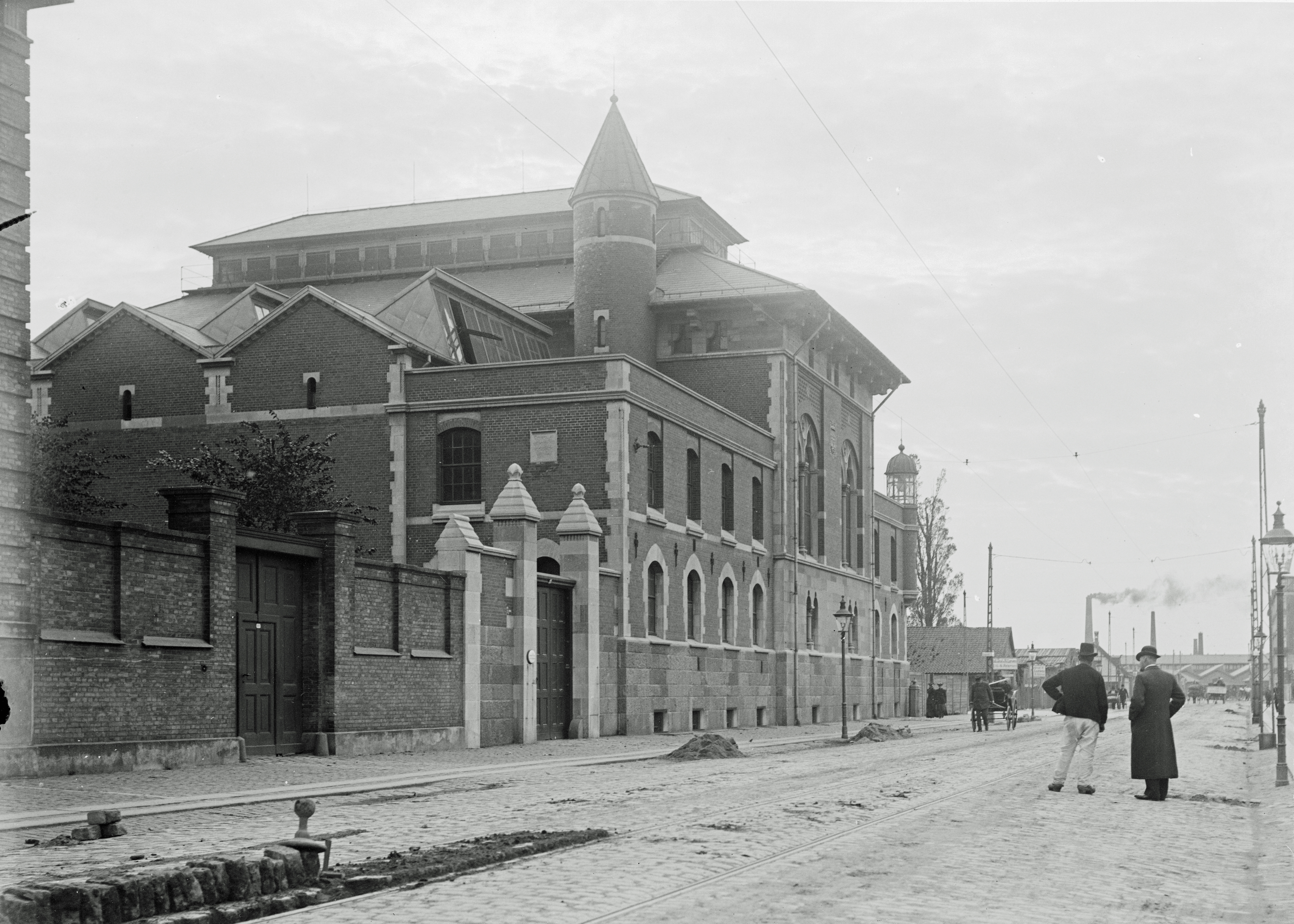
The Western Power Station photographed by Fritz Theodor Benzen in 1903

The first power station in Copenhagen was built by Københavns Belysningsvæsen in 1892 at Gothersgade. In 1896, it was decided to build a new power station at Tietgensgade (then Ny Vestergades Forlængelse). The work was headed by chief engineer Carl Hentzen. Western Power Station was inaugurated on 7 September 1898. It was expanded several times over the next few years to be able to supply electricity for Copenhagen Tramways.

From 1908, it also served as a substation under the new Eastern Power Station on Øster Allé in Østerbro. The substation was expanded in 1912.

In 1921, the power plant was discontinued. The substation was again expanded in the period until 1936. The two existing 30/6 kV transformers were supplemented by a third transformer in 194 and a fourth transformer was added in 1957. Tietgensgade Substation was again adapted in 1961 and 1974.

I 1961 blev en ældre del af kedelanlægget, der før havde fungeret som reserve for varmeværkerne, demonteret. I 1974 blev omformeranlægget yderligere demonteret som led i ombygningen af værket. Værket skulle nu fungere som hovedtransformerstation til forsyning af 6 kV fordelingsnettet. Den ombyggede station blev kaldt Tietgensgade Transformerstation.

== Architecture ==
The original power station from 1898 as well as all later extension have been constructed in red brick. Some existing roofs had to be raised to make space for technical installations in connection with the conversion 2011-14 conversion into a district cooling plant, creating a new superstructure in patterned brickwork.

== Tietgensgade District Cooling Plant ==
The building was in 2011-14 converted into a combined district cooling plant and administration office by Gottlieb Paludan Architects. The plant has a capacity of 18 MW and supplies Copenhagen City Hall, the Danish National Archives and a number of major hotels and office buildings with environmentally friendly cooling, produced with the aid of sea water from the harbour.

The administration office has 12 staff members and comprises meeting facilities, workshops, storage rooms, shower and changing rooms for 30 people together with a kitchen and lunch room.

== See also ==
- H. C. Ørsted Power Station
