= Lauritz Peter Holmblad =

Danish industrialist (1815–1890)

Lauridz Peter Holmblad
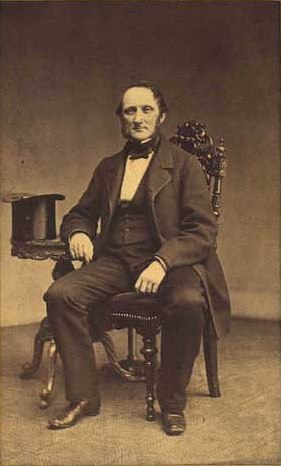
- Holmblad
- Born: 8 July 1815; Copenhagen, Denmark
- Died: 16 November 1890 (aged 75); Copenhagen, Denmark
- Occupations: businessman, industrialist

Lauritz Peter Holmblad (8 July 1815 – 16 November 1890), often referred to as L. P. Holmblad, was a Danish industrialist and philanthropist. His company, which was simply known as L. P. Holmblad, had activities in dyes, soap, glue and playing cards. Holmblad was also part of the circle around Carl Frederik Tietgen, co-founding several of his companies.

Holmblad is associated with Amager, Copenhagen, where Holmbladsgade is named after him.

== Family background ==
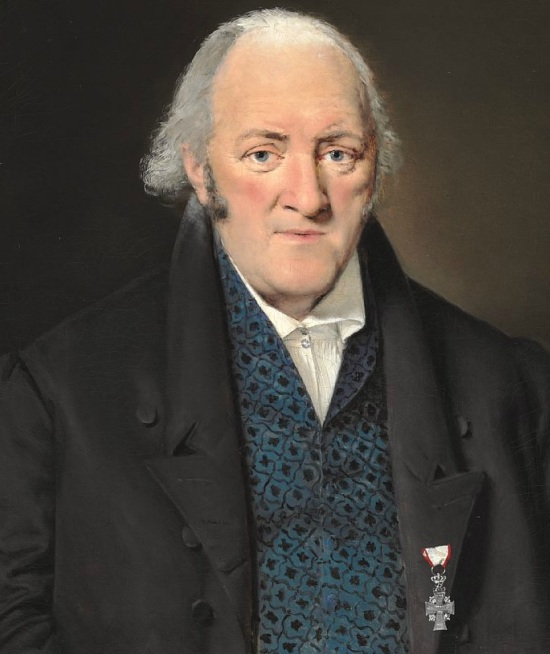
Holmblad's grandfather, Lauridz Holmblad, painted by Christian Albrecht Jensen in 1827

L. P. Holmblad was born into a family of industrialists on 8 July 1815. His great-grandfather, Jacob Holmblad, a Swedish dyer who emigrated to Denmark in about 1766, introduced new production methods at the Royal Textile Factory where he used Rubia plants to produce the red dye for the Royal Life Guards' gala uniforms. In 1777 he obtained a royal privilege to set up his own dye factory. It was situated in Sølvgade (No. 38, now Holmblad House) but later moved to the corner of Gothersgade and Regnegade. The enterprise was later taken over by his son, Lauridz Holmblad, who also founded a soap factory in 1805 and started Denmark's first real production of paint in 1819. L. P. Holmblad's father Jacob Holmblad inherited the soap factory in 1827 while his uncle Carl Frederik Holmblad took over the paint factory, the future Sadolin & Holmblad.

Jacob Holmblad's soap factory on the corner of Gothersgade and Regnegade also comprised productions of both lacquer and playing cards. His activities also comprised a glue factory and a marrow oil factory in Amager.

== L. P. Holmblad ==
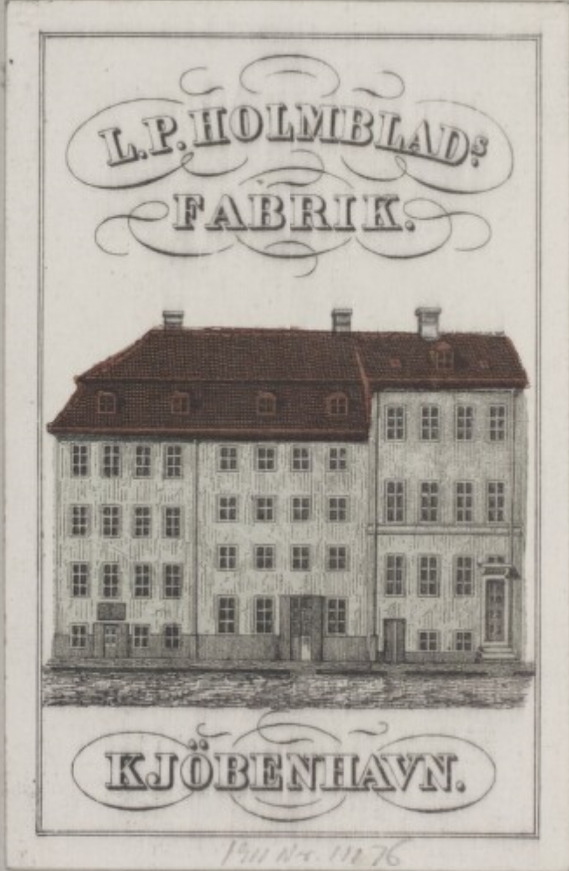
L. P. Holmblad's Factory in Gothersgade

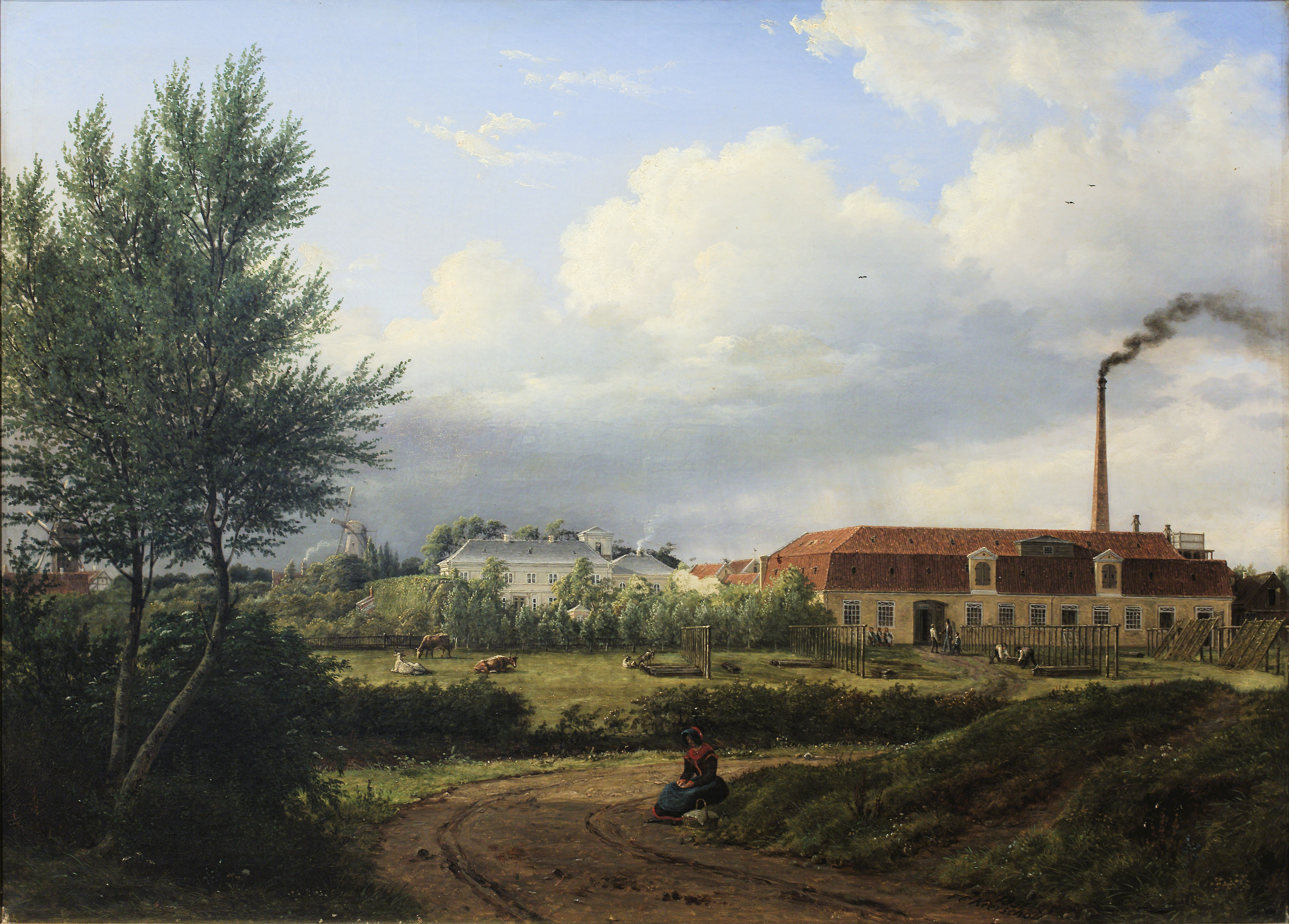
L. P. Holmblad's oil mill and candle manufactory, built 1842–46. Painted by F.C. Kiærskou in 1851

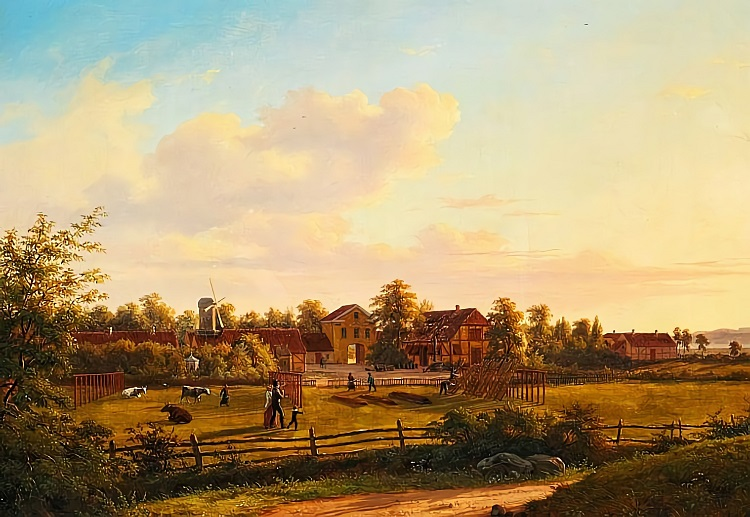
Holmblad's glue factory painted by the same artist

After his father's death in 1837, L. P. Holmblad took over the management of the companies on behalf of his mother. In 1841, he established a whale oil plant. After his mother ceded the companies to him in 1842, he also founded a candle factory, which was the first in Denmark to use stearin in the manufacture of candles. It was a great success and had to be expanded in 1847. In 1880, L. P. Holmblad moved their production of stearin candles to Blegdamsvej, where they had acquired O.F. Asp's candle factory which was expanded by Hans Jørgen Holm. Holmblad also built a new factory in Amager in 1880.

== Other engagements ==
From 1846 to 1859, Holmblad was a member of the Copenhagen City Council. In 1862, he was elected to Privatbanken's bank council, where he remained a loyal supporter of Carl Frederik Tietgen until his death. He took an active part in the industrial and commercial heyday that took place under Tietgen's leadership after 1864. In 1866 he co-founded Det Forenede Dampskibs-Selskab, where he was also a board member from 1870. He was also a co-founder of Burmeister & Wain (1872), Em. Z. Svitzers Bjergnings-Entreprise and Great Northern Telephone Company (1870). He also became a board member of De Danske Sukkerfabrikker in 1874.

Holmblad was also involved in companies that were not associated with Tietgen. He was vice chairman of De private Assurandeurer from 1883 and from 1886 its chairman. In 1886, he became a board member of Nye danske Brandforsikringsselskab.

== Philanthropy ==
Holmblad was an active philanthropist. In 1857 he became curator of Vajsenhuset and in 1870 one of its three directors. From 1876 he was chairman of the association behind the construction of Kunstnerhjemmet which provided affordable housing and studio facilities for artists.

In Amager, where most of his companies were gradually concentrated, he was a great supporter of the poor as well as the construction of both schools and churches.

== Legacy ==
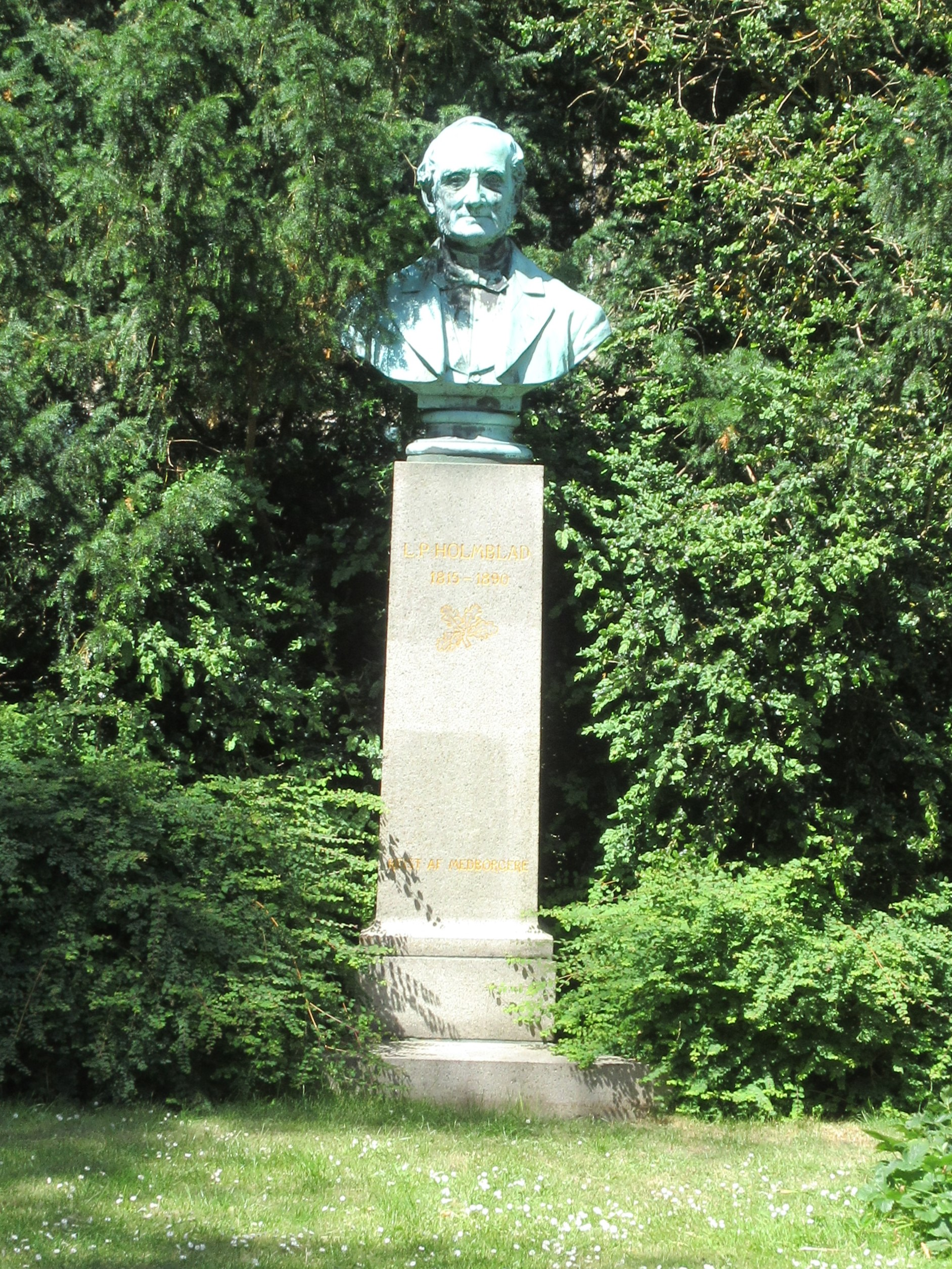
Bust of Holmblad in one of the courtyards of Amager Hospital in Copenhagen

After L. P. Holmblad's death, his company continued to exist under the leadership of first his son and then his grandson until 1919, when it was merged into O.F. Asp under the name ASP-Holmblad. It was part of a larger merger, Medicinalco, which also included three other companies: Gustav Lotze, Th. Lose & Co. and A. Appelts.

The street Holmbladsgade is named after Lauritz Peter Holmblad. Several buildings associated with him still exist today. Holmbladsgade Cultural Centre is based in one of his old buildings, a warehouse from 1880. It was adapted for its current use by Dorte Mandrup in 2001. His oil mill, built the same year, is located next to it. His former candle factory on Blegdamsvej is located at No. 104. The expansion (1880) was designed by Hans Jørgen Holm (windows have been changed). His villa on Holmbladsgade was acquired by Nathanael's Church and adapted for use as a parish house in 1988. His country house Skovbakken is in Skodsborg, north of Copenhagen (Strandvej 253). The house was designed by Ferdinand Meldahl in the style of a "Norwegian cottage" and built in 1859.
