= Kiærskou =

Kiærskou is a Danish surname. Notable people with the surname include:

- Frederik Christian Kiærskou (1805–1891), Danish landscape painter
- Hjalmar Kiærskou (1835–1900), Danish botanist
- Lotte Kiærskou (born 1975), Danish team handball player
