= Holmbladsgade Cultural Centre =

Culture house in Copenhagen, Denmark

Coordinates: 55.6653°N 12.6043°E

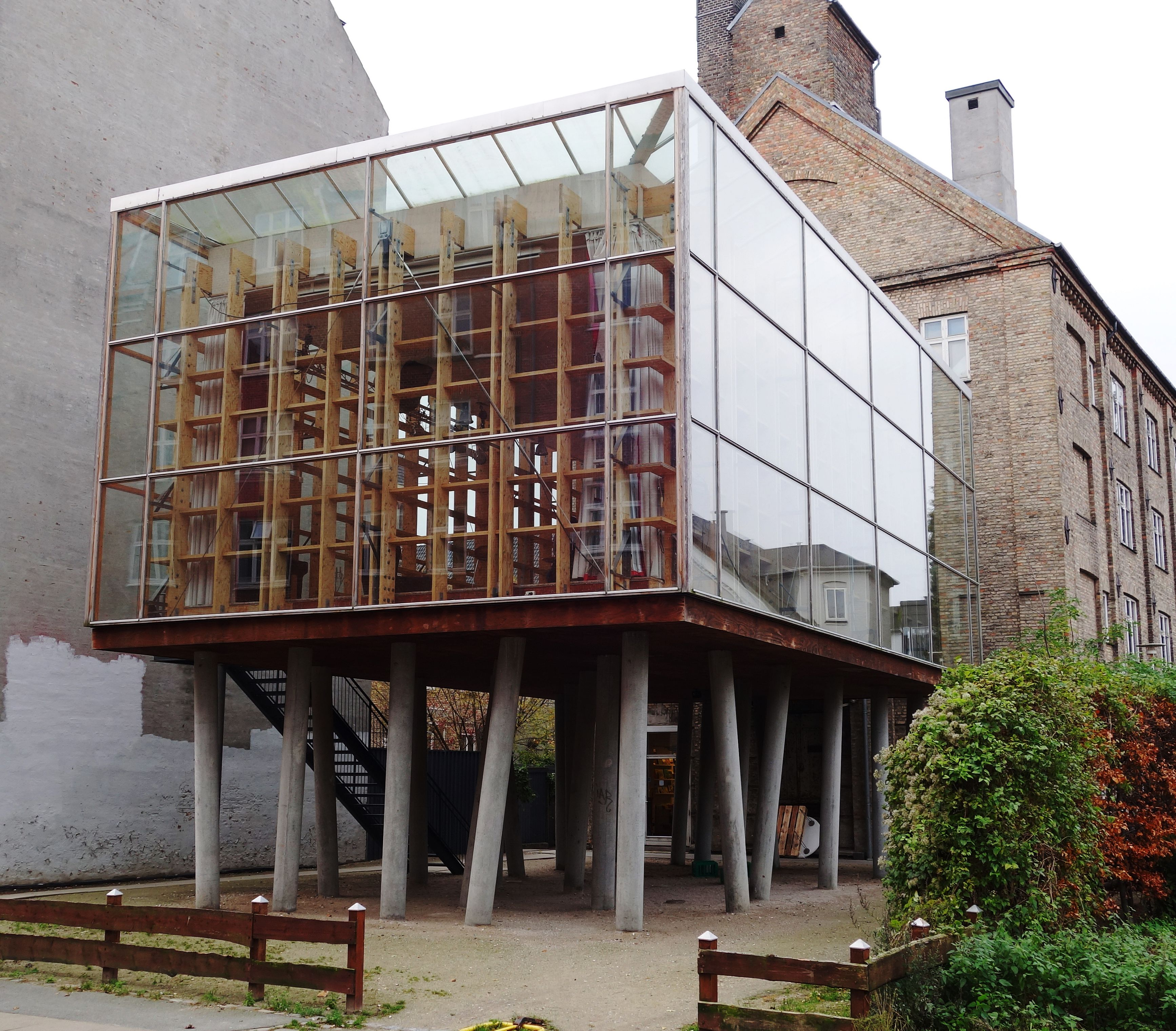
A picture of the Holmbladsgade Cultural Centre

Kvarterhuset, located just off Holmbladsgade, is a culture house run by Copenhagen Municipality in the Amager district of Copenhagen, Denmark. The building is a former warehouse which was adapted and expanded for its current use by Dorte Mandrup prior to its opening in 2001. It contains the local Sundby Library as well as other facilities for the local community.

== History ==
The warehouse was built for Lauritz Peter Holmblad in association with his oil mill which is still located next to the building. Holmblad had previously owned a stud farm on the site (Jemtelandsgadewas 1). The warehouse was designed by Georg Ebbe Wineken Møller, built by Christian Peter Wienberg and inaugurated on 24 November 1880.

The original address of the warehouse was Holmbladsgade 9 but it was changed to Jemtelandsgadewas 3 when Jemtelandsgadewas and Praghs Boulevard was established in about 1916.

The warehouse was in 1913 sold to Johannes William Reve established a production of signs and advertisements in the building. In 1918, it changed hands once again when it was sold to A/S Kruckkow-Wadorf, a Lithography business that produced a variety of goods, including playing cards and reproductions of works by famous painters. Some 300 employees worked in the building in 1920. It has later been used for offices before it was purchased by Copenhagen Municipality in 1997 as part of the facelift of the Holmbladsgade neighbourhood.

== Building ==
The adaption of the building removed the original floor decks to create a new, triple-high foyer space running the length of the building.

The building is extended with an assembly hall that is raised one storey above the ground on concrete pillars. The supporting structure in the hall is an exposed framework of plywood clad with glazing panels in pine frames.

== Facilities and activities ==
Kvartershuset houses Sundby Library, a youth club, a café and various other facilities for the local community. It also arranges in-house and outdoor cultural events

== See also ==
- Prismen
