= De private Assurandeurer =

Marine insurance company in Denmark

De Private Assurandører was a marine insurance company founded in 1786 in Copenhagen, Denmark.

== History ==
In 1726, Det kgl. octr. Søe-Asseurance Compagni was granted a monopoly on marine insurance in Denmark. In the middle of the century, its monopoly was challenged by Niels Ryberg and other major merchants.

De private Assurandeurer was founded by a group of private operators on 1 March 1786. Prominent participants in the company included I. Erichsen, Niels Brock, Frédéric de Coninck, Joseph Hambro, Andreas Nicolai Hansen and C. F. Tietgen. Lauritz Nicolai Hvidt was part of the management. His son, Eduard Julius Hvist, joined the management in 1831 (alongside J. F. Wessely) and members of the Hvidt family would play central roles in the company for more than a hundred years.

From 1924, De private Assurandeurer was also active in the market for fire insurances. The company was converted into a limited company (aktieselskab) in 1046. The company was based at Palægade 2. Peter Leth (born 1901) was CEO of the company in 1950.

== Chairmen ==
- (1886?Lauritz Peter Holmblad
