= Holmbladsgade =

Street in Amagerbro, Copenhagen, Denmark

Coordinates: 55.6650°N 12.6061°E

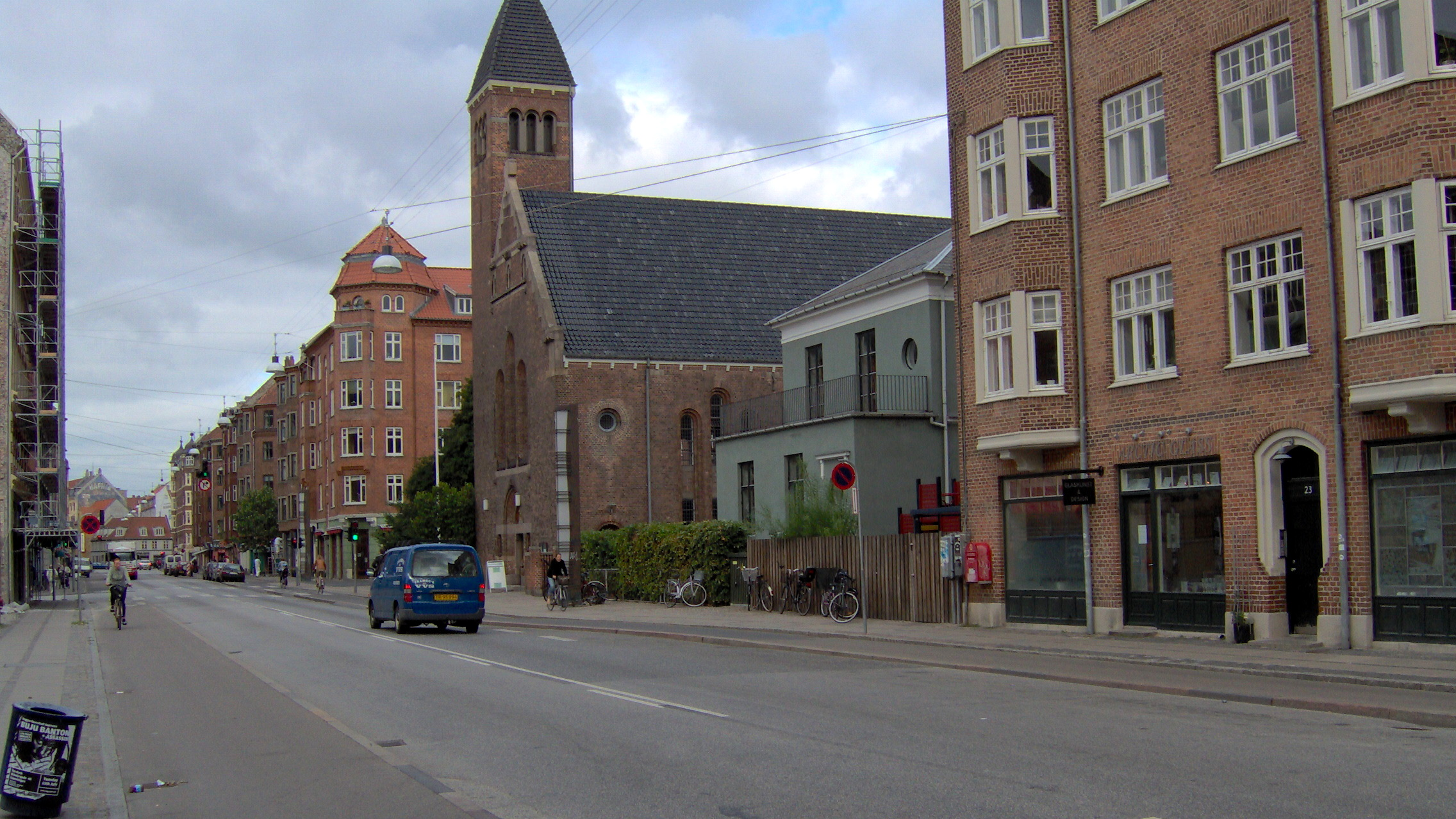
Holmbladsgade at Nathanael's Church

Holmbladsgade is one of the most lively streets in the Amagerbro district of Copenhagen, Denmark, connecting Amagerbrogade to Strandlodsvej on the east coast of Amager. The surrounding neighbourhood is variously referred to as Holmbladsgadekvarteret (literally "The Holmbladsgade neighbourhood"), Amagerbro or Sundby North.

== History ==
The street was originally known as Køhlertsvej (Køhlerts Road) and was access road to Køhlert's textile manufactury which had been founded in about 1770. Christianshavn Iron Foundry and Machine Factory built a large industrial complex at the road in the 1980s.

The street received its current name in 1897 after Lauritz Peter Holmblad, a local industrialist and philanthropist, who had his home in the street until his death in 1890.

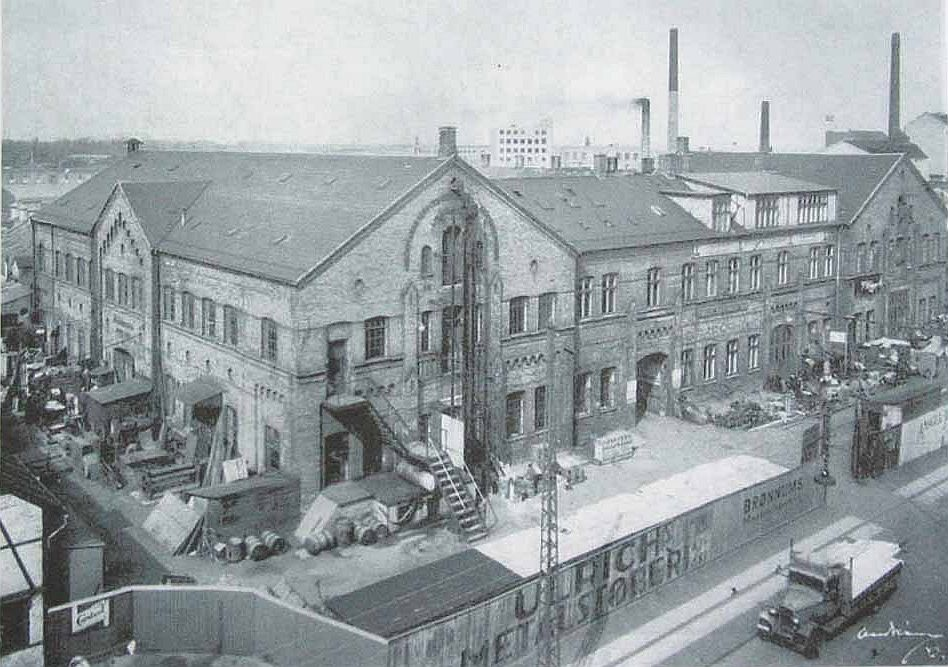
The iron foundry and machine factory

Nathanael's Church was inaugurated in 1899 and over the next decades many apartment buildings sprung up along the street, which became part of a dense working-class neighbourhood. Many new industrial enterprises also established in the street, including Holmblad's old glue factory, the later Sadolin & Holmblad, which inaugurated a new factory at No. 70in 1903. Other industrial establishments along the street was a meat-packing central (Slagteriernes Central), manufacturer of metal sheet goods and various storage buildings. Christianshavn Iron Foundry and Machine Factory existed under various names until the 1960s when the complex was taken over by a galvanization facility (galvaniseringsanstalten).

Most of the industry disappeared towards the end of the century and many of its buildings were torn down to make way for modern ones. The iron foundry complex from the 1880s was demolished in 1979 and replaced by støberigården which was built in the mid-1980s. Sadolin & Holmblad's building was demolished in 2001 and replaced by Sadolin Parken, a mixed-use development, which was inaugurated in 2004.

The street became subject to a comprehensive gentrification programme in 1897. The initiative received the German Bilfinger Berger Award as an "exemplary urban development project".

== Notable buildings and residents ==
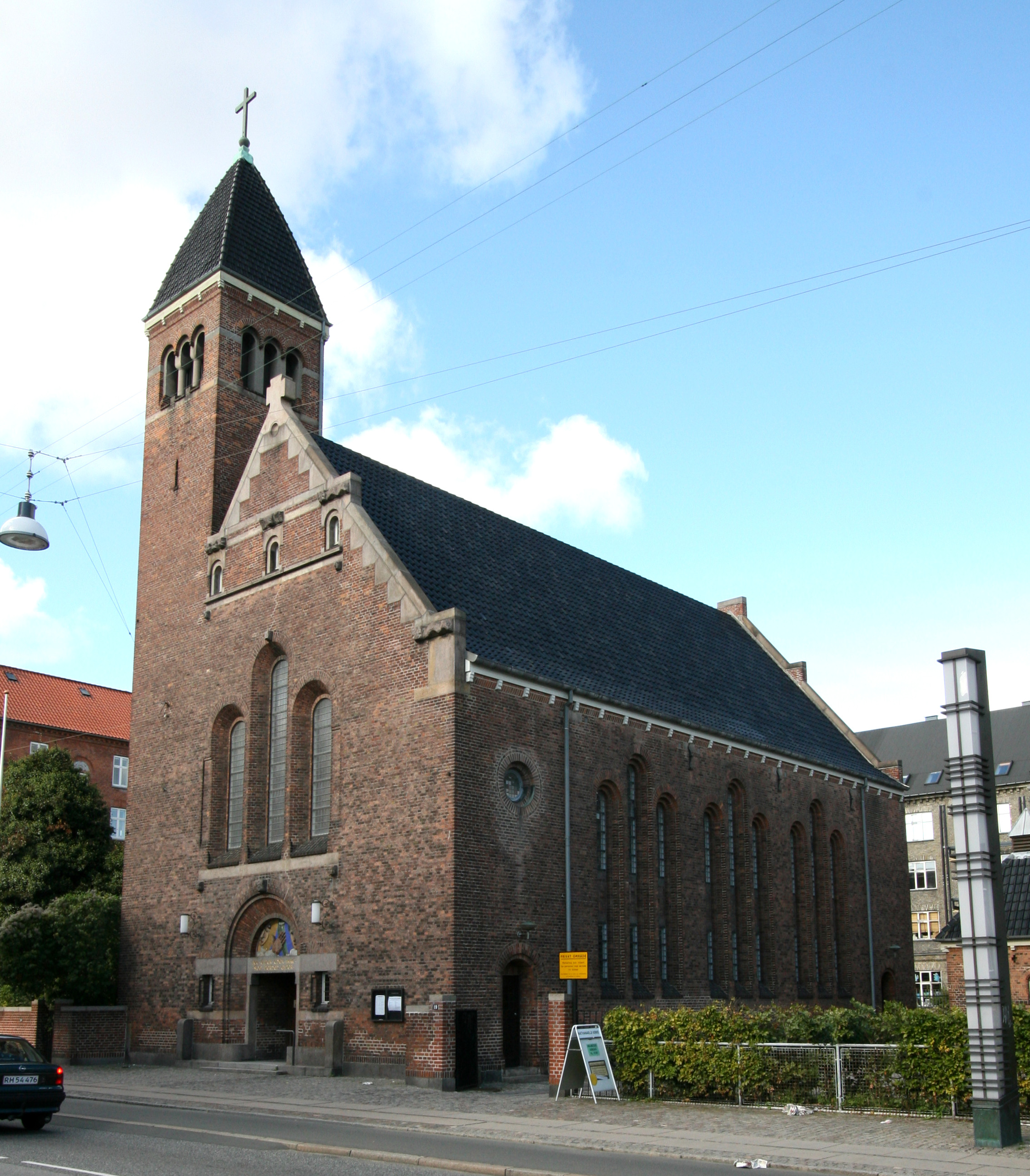
Nathanael's Church

Nathanael's Church's was completed in 1899. Its architect is Thorvald Jørgensen who later designed the present Christiansborg Palace. The church took over Holmblad's villa which was expanded and adapted in 1988 and is now known as Nathanaels Sognegård. The oldest surviving building in the street is the low building from 1859 at No. 70.

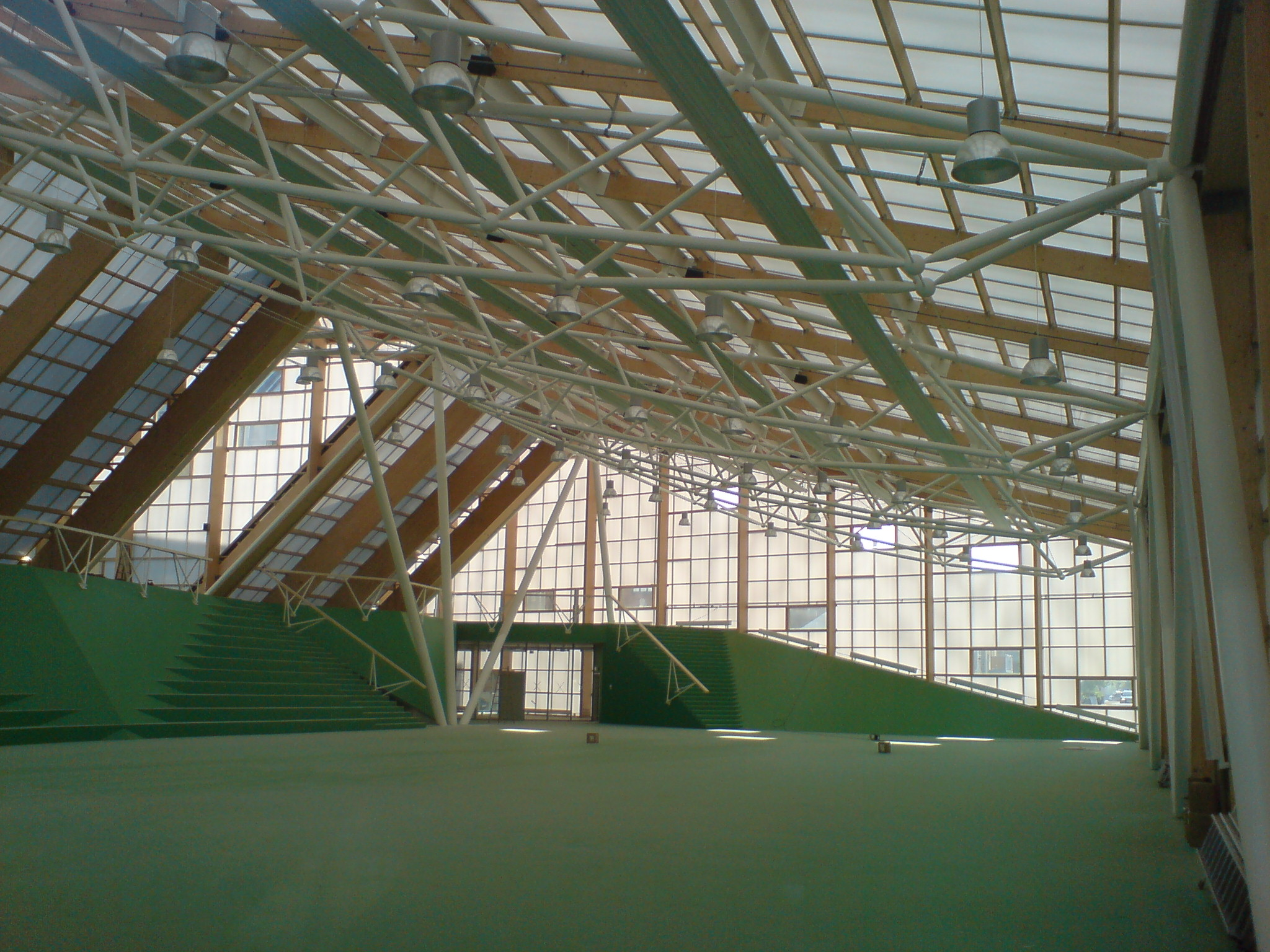
Prismen interior

Dorte Mandrup designed two community centres in connection with the facelift of the area. Holmbladsgade Cultural Centre, a former warehouse associated with Holmblad's oil mill, was inaugurated in 2001 and contains the local Sundby Library as well as various other facilities for the local community. Prismen ("The Crystal") was inaugurated in 2006 and is a multifunctional sports and cultural venue. An appendage to the surrounding buildings, it has a characteristic angled form and a translucent skin of polycarbonate panels which contrasts the bricks of the surrounding buildings, let daylight into the building in the daytime and makes it glow at night.

== Luminary columns ==
A series of luminary columns designed by Bjarne Schlæger was installed along the street in 2003. The horizontal lines represent Holmbladgade's side streets while the wavy lines represent Amager Beach on the coast at the far end of the street. The integrated lighting is intended to contribute a sense of place in the night time. The detailing is in Tombac.
