= L. P. Holmblad =

L. P. Holmblad was a Copenhagen-based Danish company with a history that dated back to 1777 and activities in dyes, soap, glue and playing cards.

== History ==
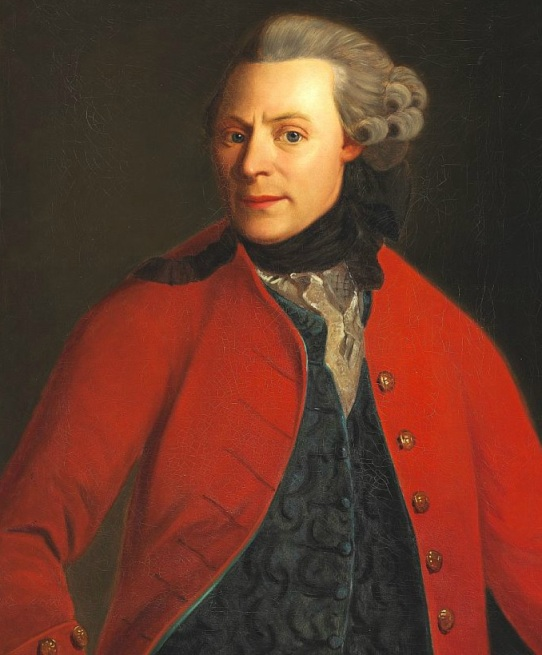
Holmblad's grandfather, Jacob Holmblad, who founded the company

The company was founded by Jacob Holmblad, a Swedish dyer who emigrated to Denmark in about 1766. He was initially employed by the Royal Textile Factory where he introduced new production methods and used Rubia plants to produce the red dye for the Royal Life Guards' gala uniforms. In 1777 he obtained a royal privilege to set up his own dye factory. It was situated in Sølvgade (No. 38, now known as the Holmblad House) but later moved to the corner of Gothersgade and Regnegade.

The enterprise was after Jacob Holmblad's death in 1806 taken over by his son, Lauridz Holmblad (1770-1827), who had recently (1805) also founded a soap factory. He started Denmark's first real production of paint in 1819.

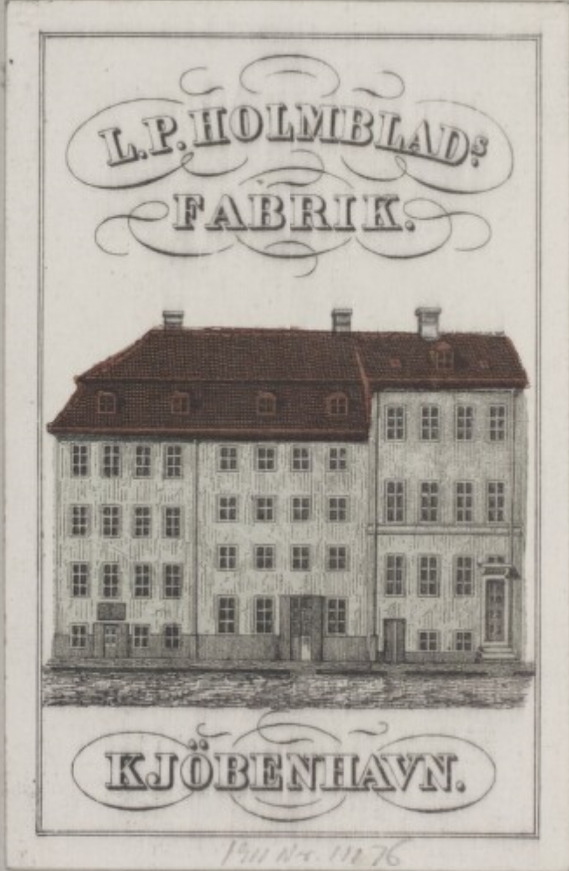
L. P. Holmblad's Factory in Gothersgade

The company was after Lauridz Holmblad's death in 1827 divided between his two sons. The soap factory was passed on to his eldest son, Jacob Holmblad (1791-1837) while his younger brother Carl Frederik Holmblad continued the paint factory under the name HOLMBLAD & Co.

Jacob Holmblad's soap factory on the corner of Gothersgade and Regnegade was also involved in the production of lacquer and playing cards. The company also established a glue factory and a marrow oil factory in Amager.

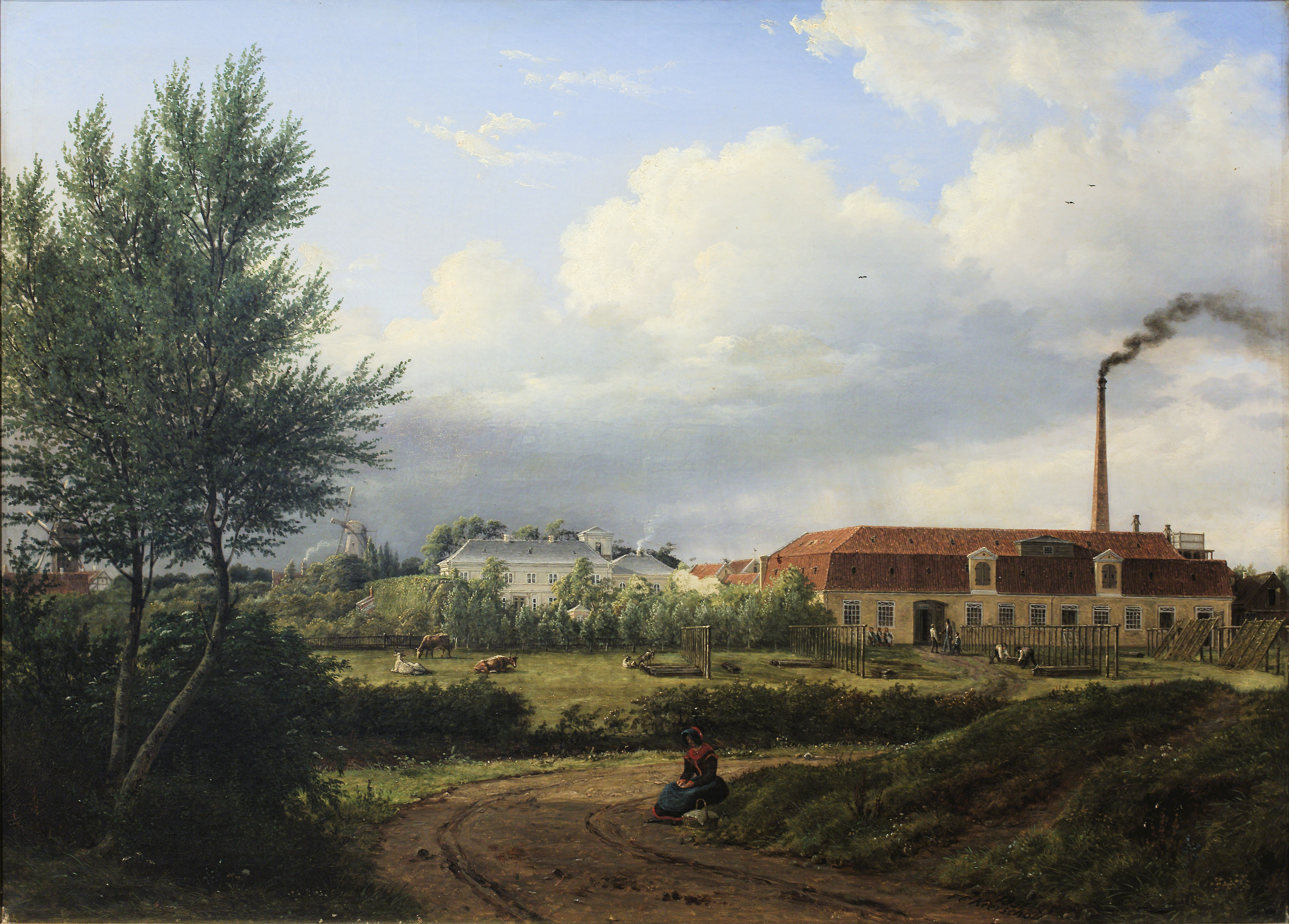
L. P. Holmblad's oil mill and candle manufactory, built 1842–46. Painted by F.C. Kiærskou in 1851.

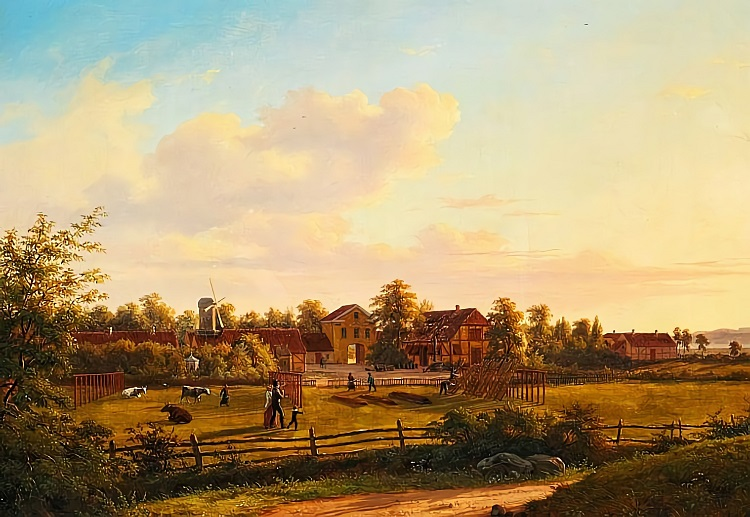
Holmblad's glue factory, painted by F.C. Kiærskou

After Jacob Holmblad's death in 1837, his son, L. P. Holmblad managed the company on behalf of his mother. In 1841, he established a production of whale oil. After his mother ceded the ownership to him in 1842, he also founded a candle factory, which was the first in Denmark to use stearin in the manufacture of candles. It was a great success and had to be expanded in 1847. In 1880, L. P. Holmblad moved their production of stearin candles to Blegdamsvej, where they had acquired O.F. Asp's candle factory which was expanded by Hans Jørgen Holm. The company also constructed a new factory in Amager in 1880.

L. P. Holmblad was in 1919 acquired by Medicinalco and merged with O. F. Asp under the name Asp-Holmblad.
