= Jægersborg Water Tower =

Building in Jægersborg, Denmark

- Jægersborg Vandtårn
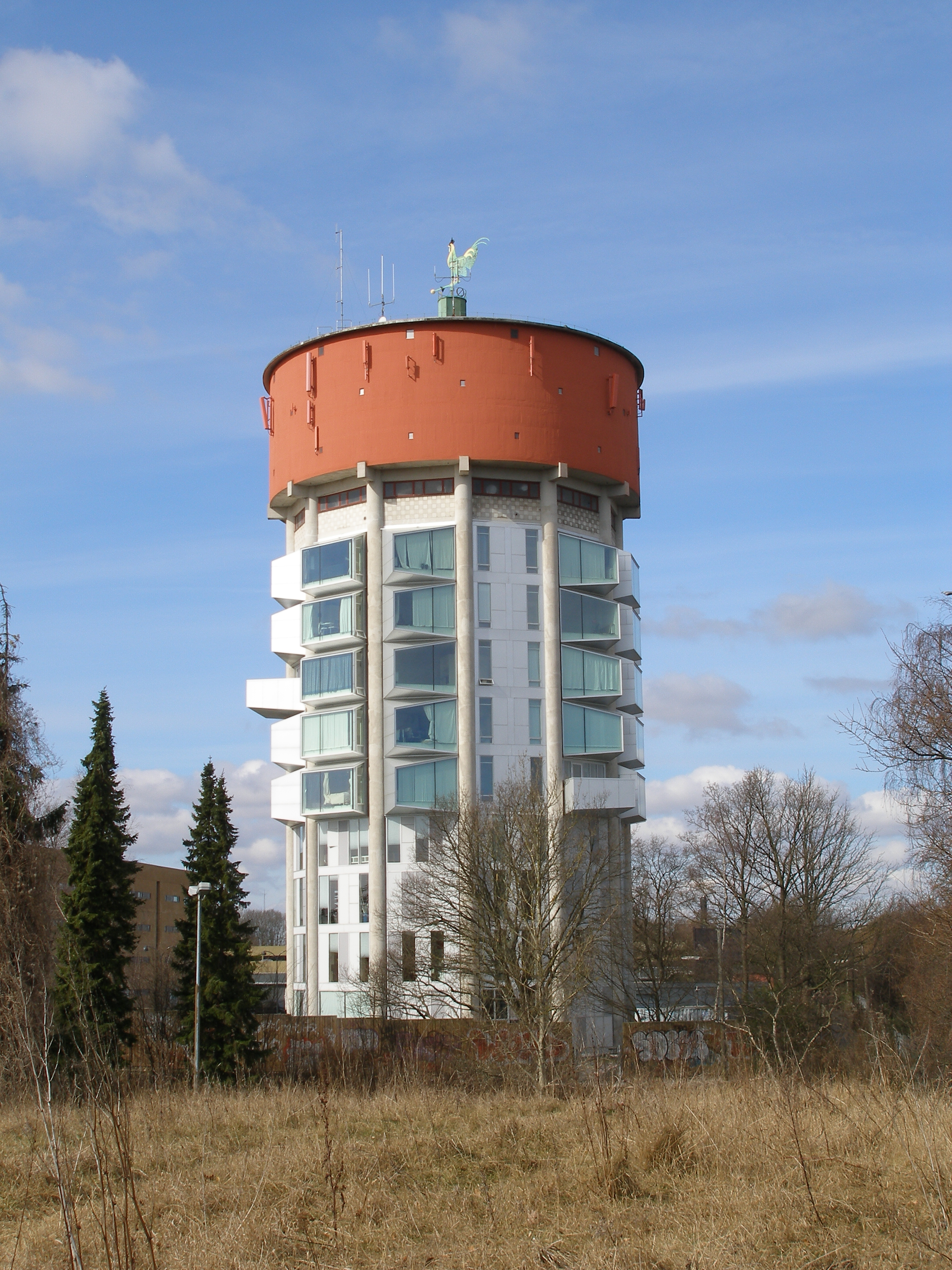

General information
- Architectural style: Functionalism
- Location: Jægersborg, Denmark
- Coordinates: 55°45′40.12″N 12°31′16.39″E
- Construction started: 1954
- Completed: 1955
- Client: Gentofte Municipality

Design and construction
- Architect: Edward Thomsen

Jægersborg Water Tower (Danish: Jægersborg Vandtårn) is a former water tower located next to Jægersborg station in Jægersborg, Gentofte Municipality, Denmark. It has been converted into youth housing to design by Dorte Mandrup.

== History ==
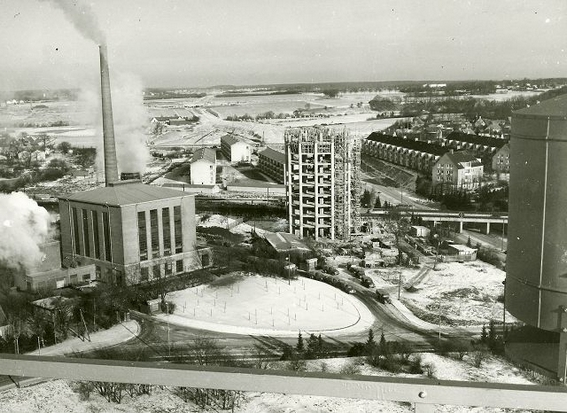
Jægersborg Water Tower under construction

The Jægersborg area experienced rapid growth in the 1960s. The increase in population and relatively high location of the area caused periodically low water pressure. It was therefore decided to build a new water tower as a supplement to the water tower at Rævebakken in Vangede and built by the construction firm Rasmussen og Schiøttz. It was designed by the architect Edvard Thomsen. The building was topped out on 24 June 1954 and it was completed in 1955. The original plan was to build apartments on the lower floors but it was given up from fear that the water would cause noise pollution. An after-school activity centre opened in the ground floor in the 1980s.

== Architecture ==
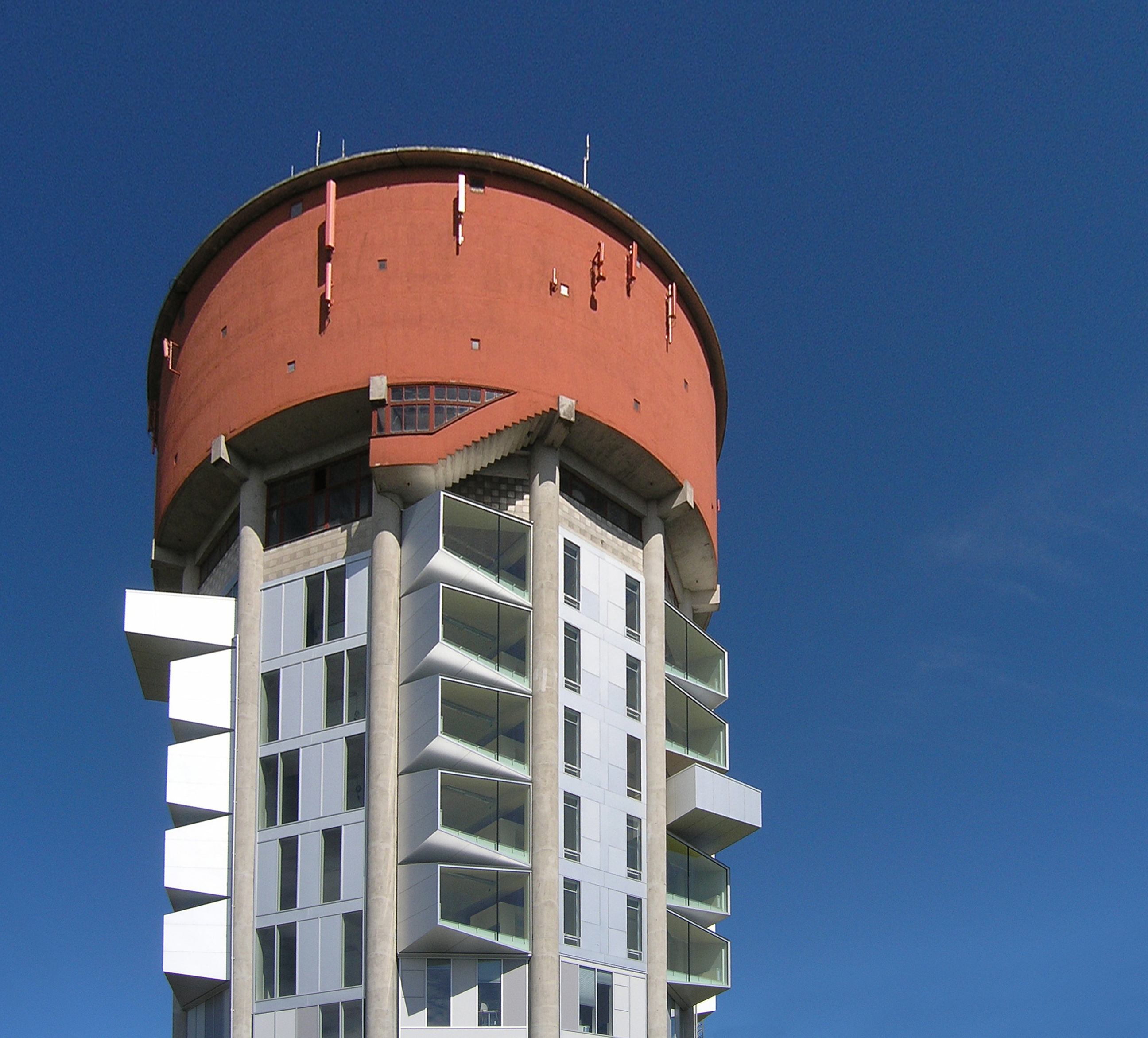
The upper part of the water tower

The water tower is 45 m tall and is topped by a three m tall, gilded weathervane. It is built in reinforced concrete. The red water tank at the top of the tower holds 2,000 cubic metres.

== Youth housing ==
The upper floors were used for play rooms and municipal archives. The five upper floors contain a total of 36 youth apartments.
