= Ræveskovsvej Water Tower =

Water tower in Copenhagen, Denmark

- Wandtårnet ved Ræveskovsvej
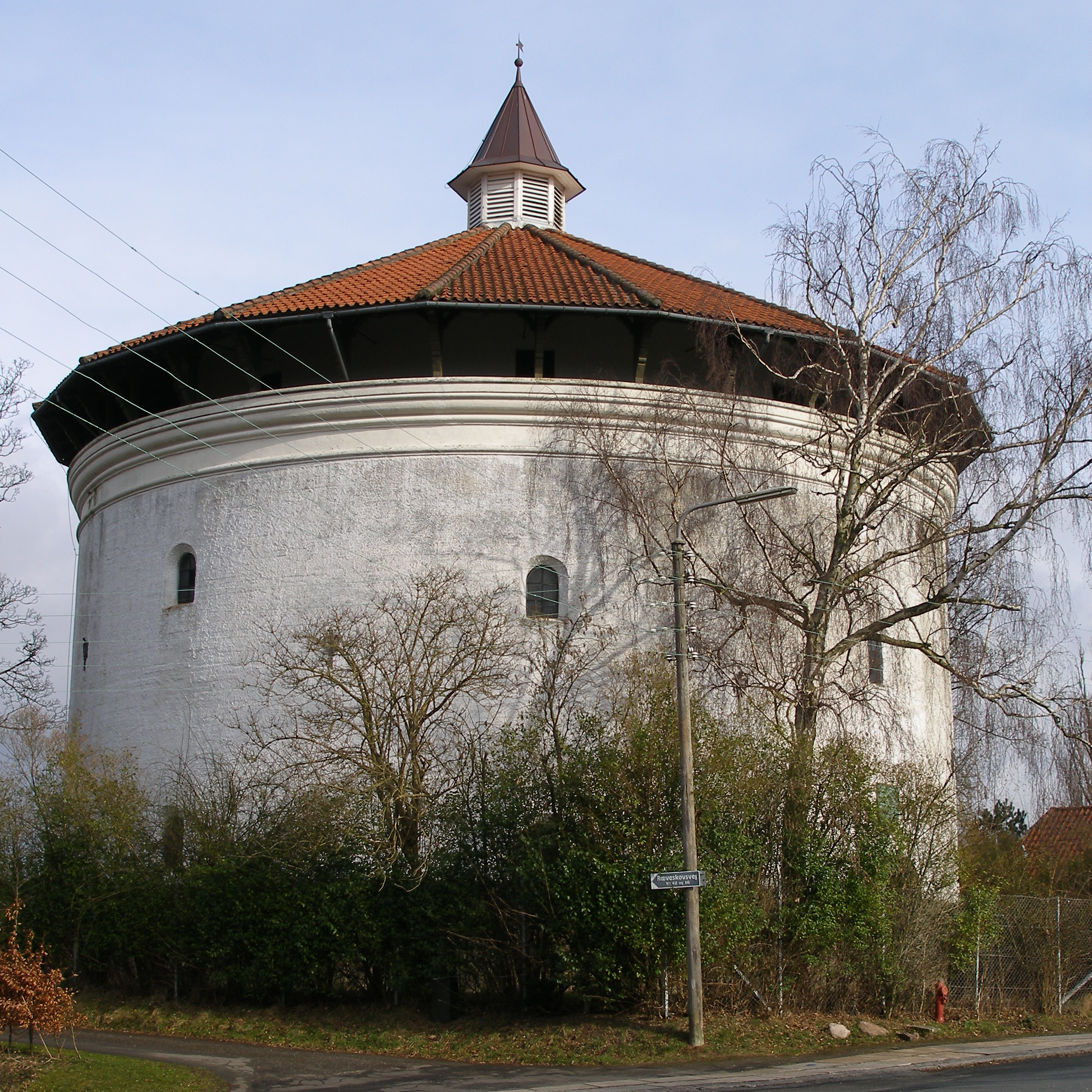
- Interactive map of the Ræveskovsvej Water Tower area

General information
- Architectural style: National Romantic
- Location: Copenhagen, Denmark
- Coordinates: 55°45′15.5″N 12°31′26.09″E
- Completed: 1905
- Client: Gentofte Municipality

Design and construction
- Architect: Andreas Theil

Rævebakkevej Water Tower, situated on Rævebakken, 36 m above sea level, is the oldest surviving water tower in Gentofte Municipality in the northern suburbs of Copenhagen, Denmark. It was built in 1905 to a National Romantic design by Andreas Theil and decommissioned in 1972.

== History ==
=== Background ===
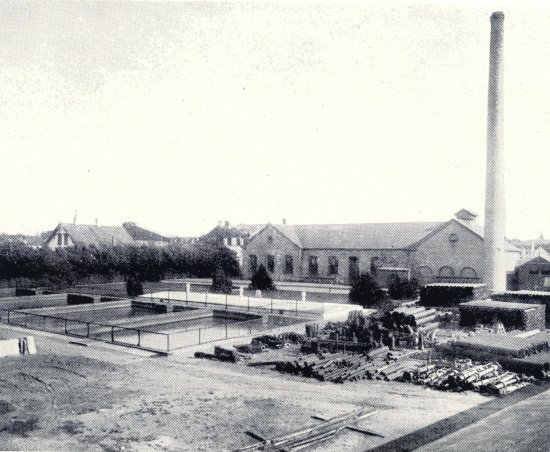
The waterworks at Mantziusvej

The planning of a modern water supply and sewer system in Gentofte began when Niels Andersen became chairman of the parish council in 1888.

The summer of 1897 was unusually hot and sunny and many wells in Hellerup dried out. Bregnegård Waterworks opened at Mantziusvej in 1900 and so did Gentofte's first water tower at H. A. Clausensvej close to Gentofte Church. They supplied Hellerup, Skovshoved, Ordrup and Gentofte with water. The system reached Vangede in 1902 and Jægersborg in 1903. The water tower was designed by Johan Schröder. The water tank had a capacity of 432 cubic metres and the water surface was located 50 metres above sea level. The site where it was built was located 26 metres above sea level and had previously belonged to Gentofte Rectory. The water was led from six pumping stations to a collection well and from there through three sand filters to the water tower at H. A. Clausensvej.

=== The water tower at Ræveskovsvej ===
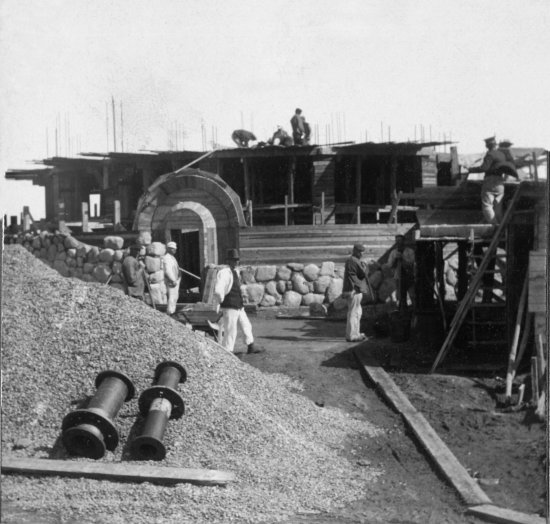
Ræveskovsvej Water Tower under construction

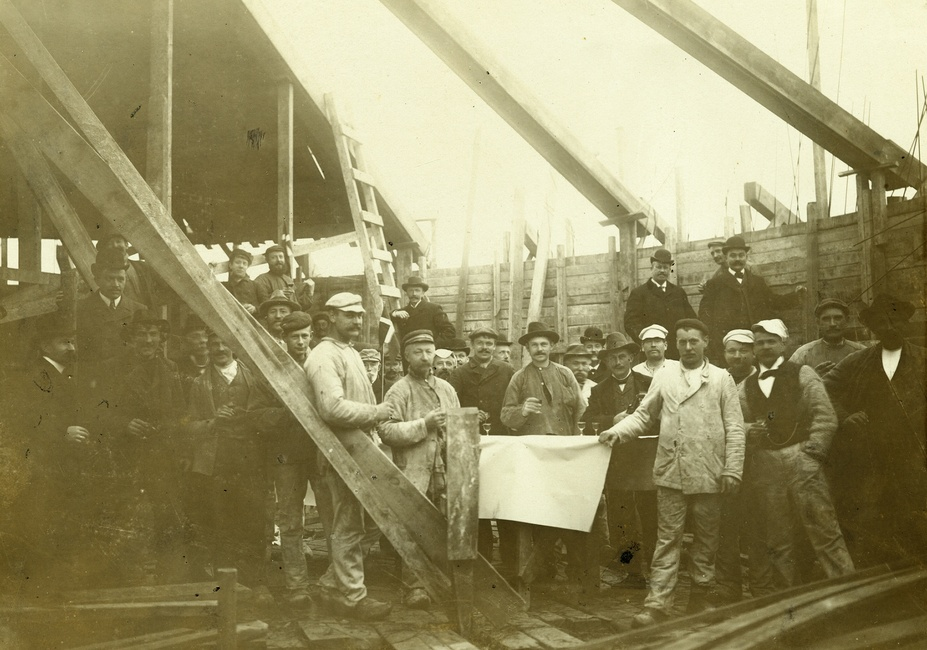
The topping off ceremont photographed by Alfred Theodor Collin

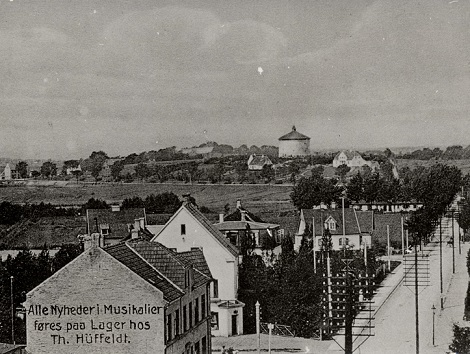
The completed water tower

The population of Gentofte Municipality increased from 14,470 in 1901 to 20,709 in 1906. The growing population created a need for a second water tower. A site which comprised Rævebakken, a 36m tall hill located circa 500 to the northeast of Vangede, was therefore acquired from the Brogården estate in 1904. The water tower was built in 1905. It was designed by the architect Andreas Thejll with collaboration with Asger Ostenfeld.

Ermelunden Waterworks, a second waterworks, opened in 1907. Sjælsø Waterworks was inaugurated in 1936.

=== Decommissioning ===
Gentofte Municipality's population peaked in 1952 at 89,142 and Tuborg Breweries increased its production increased dramatically, leading to new capacity problems for its water supply system. It was therefore decided to build a new and taller water tower at jægersborg station. Jægersborg Water Tower was inaugurated in 1956. The water tower at Ræveskovsvej was decommissioned in 1972.

== Description ==
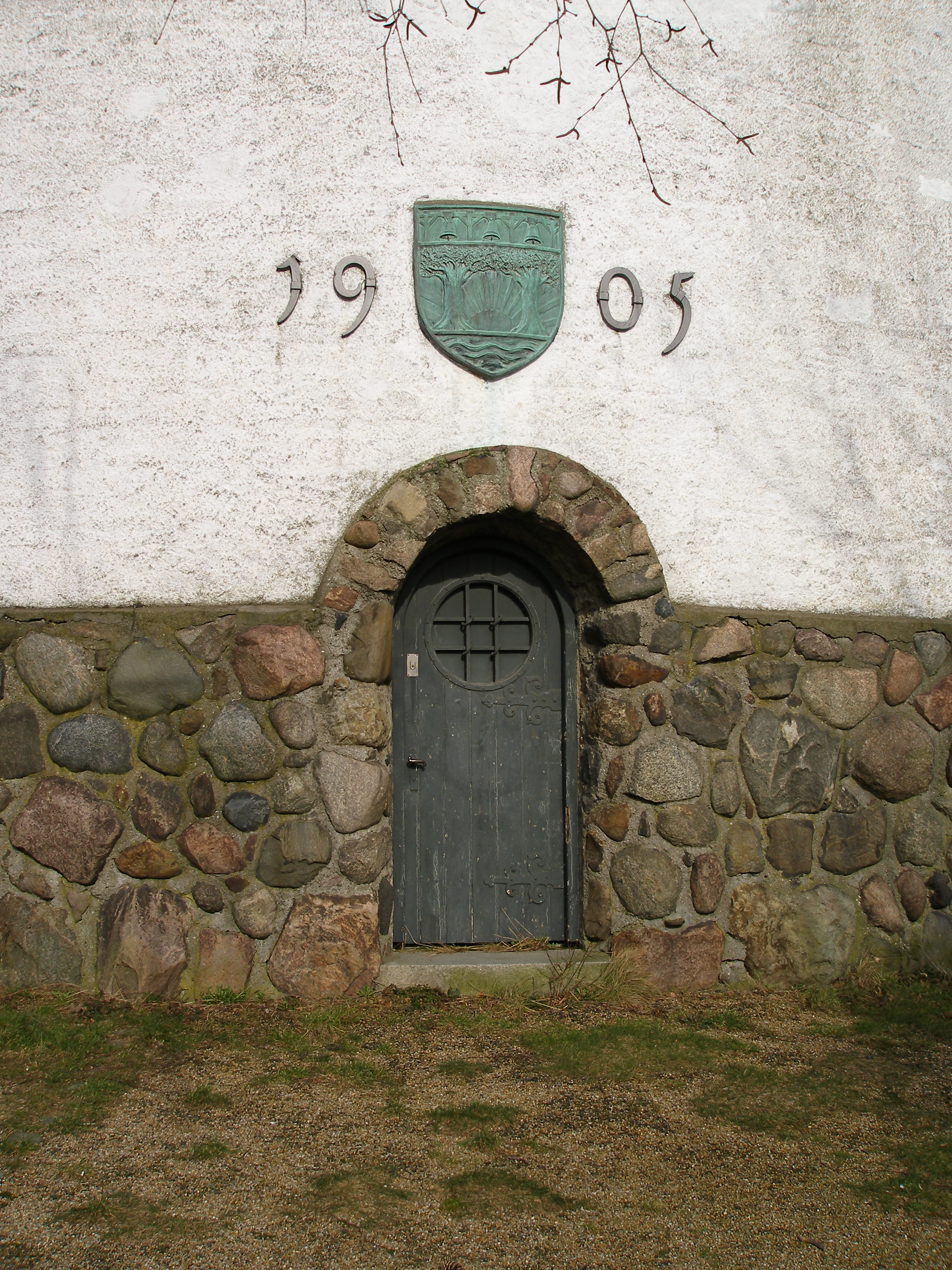
The entrance

The tower is designed in the National Romantic style. The design is reminiscent of that of the gunpowder magazine in Frederikshavn. It is built in reinforced concrete and stands on a foundation of boulders. The water tank has a capacity of just over 1,000 cubic metres and is supported by pillars. The windows are small and arched. Above the entrance is Gentofte's old coat of arms featuring three church bells as well as the year '1905'. The roof is finished by a small copper-clad spire with Weather vane. Just below the roof is a walkway.

== See also ==
- Copenhagen Waterworks
