= Holmblad House =

Building in Copenhagen, Denmark

- Holmblads Gård
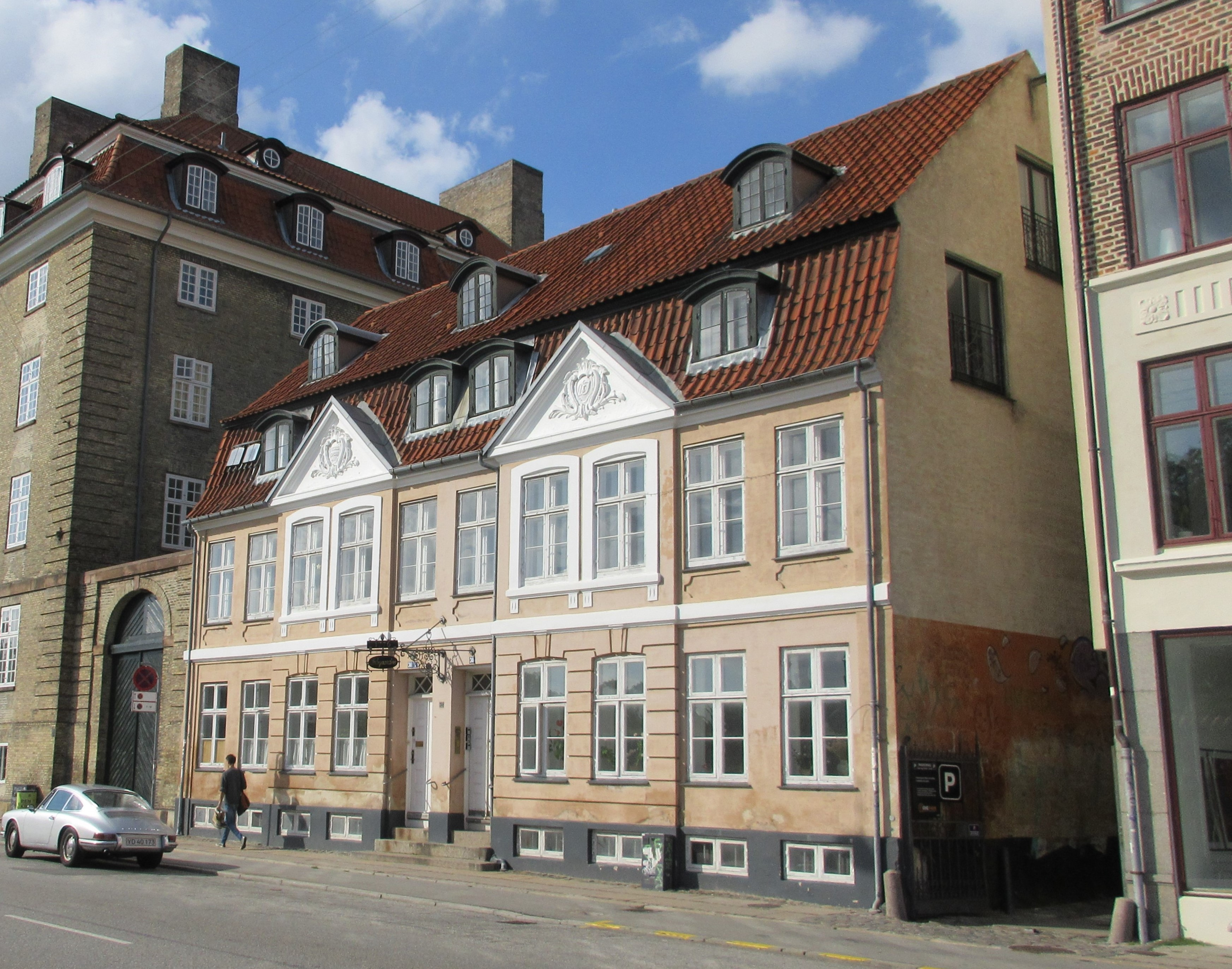
- Interactive map of the Holmblad House area

General information
- Location: Copenhagen, Denmark
- Coordinates: 55°41′13.21″N 12°34′50.14″E
- Completed: 1776
- Client: Jacob Holmblad

The Holmblad House (Danish: Jacob Holnblads Gård), now also known as Sølvgården, is a former 18th-century dyeing facility at Sølvgade 38 in Copenhagen, Denmark. Its founder, Jacob Holmblad, also had his home in the complex. The building was listed by the Danish Heritage Agency in the Danish national registry of protected buildings in 1918.

== History ==
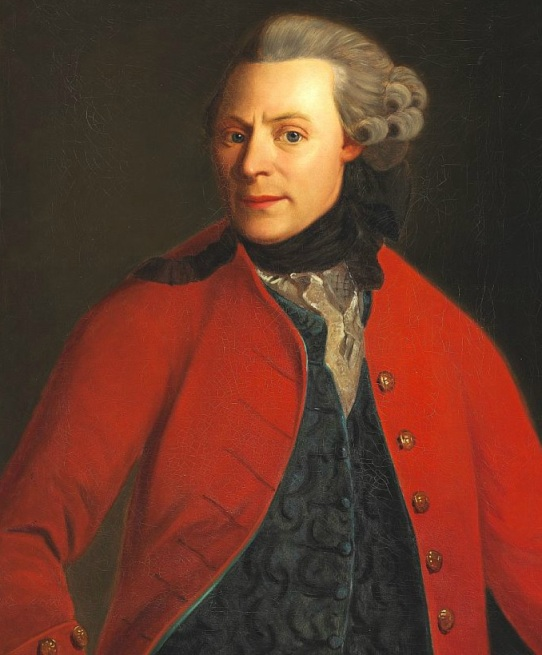
Jacob Holmblad

Jacob Holmblad was born in 1736 in Sweden, the son of Lars Holm (1697–1767) who was farrier at Tjolöholm Castle. He completed an apprenticeship as dyer and emigrated to Denmark in about 1766. He was soon employed at the Royal Textile Manufactury in Rigensgade where he introduced new production methods at the Garrison Hospital. He used Rubia plants to produce the red dye for the Royal Life Guards' gala uniforms. In 1775 he obtained a royal license to set up his own dye factory. It was built in Sølvgade in Sølvgade, around the corner from where he had until then worked.

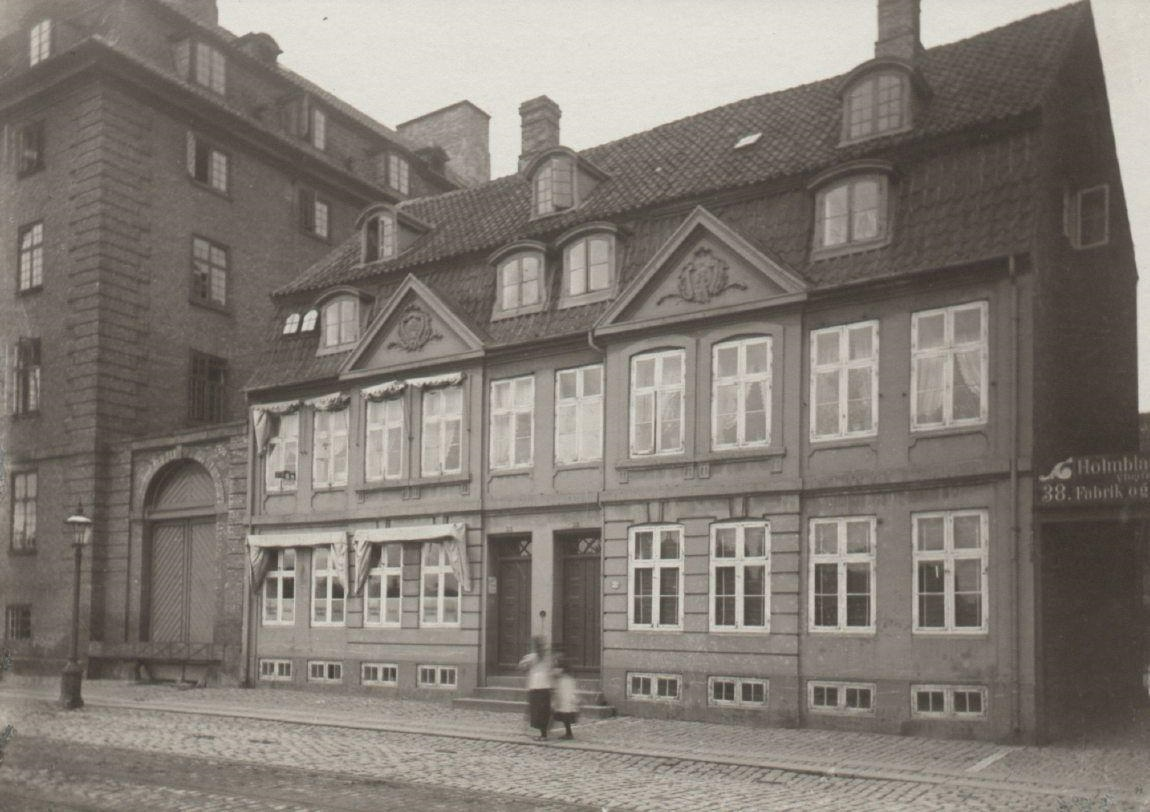
The Holmblad House in 1898

The company later moved to the corner of Gothersgade and Regnegade. The enterprise was later taken over by his son, Lauridz Holmblad, who also founded a soap factory in 1805 and started Denmark's first real production of paint in 1819. L. P. Holmblad's father Jacob Holmblad inherited the soap factory in 1827 while his uncle Carl Frederik Holmblad took over the paint factory, the later Sadolin & Holmblad.

Later residents in the house in Sølvgade include Christian Thorning Engelstoft who lived there in the 1830s. He later became Bishop of the Diocese of Funen as well as Minister of Education in 1860. The composer Niels W. Gade lived in the house in 1856–57.

== Architecture ==
The Holmblad House is designed in the Baroque style. Just two storeys tall and 10 bays long, it is the lowest building in the street. It consists of two symmetrically arranged halves under a single mansard roof with red tiles. Each half features a central projection crowned by a triangular pediment with relief decorations. The western half may already have been completed in 1763 while the eastern one is from 1867. A large gateway to the left of the building opens to the yard. The main building has a side wing that projects from its rear side, connecting to a three-storey warehouse. The buildings in the courtyard have yellow finishing, unlike the facade on the street which is finished in a light greyish colour.

== Today ==
The complex was purchased by Artha Ejendomme A/S in 2015 and put through a renovation. It contains 13 apartments and seven commercial tenancies.
