= Hjalmar Kiærskou =

Danish botanist (1835–1900)

Hjalmar Frederik Christian Kiærskou (6 August 1835 in Copenhagen – 18 March 1900), sometimes also stated as Hjalmar Kiaerskov, was a Danish botanist.

Hjalmar Kiærskou was the son of landscape artist Frederik Christian Jakobsen Kiærskou (1805–1891). In 1862 he graduated as Magister for Science. In 1861 he became an assistant at the University of Copenhagen Botanical Garden. From 1875 to 1883 he was librarian at the botanical library. In 1873 he married his cousin Margrethe Olivia Gindrup. In 1883 he became an inspector at the Natural History Museum of Denmark. From 1869 to 1893 he was editor of the journal Botanisk Tidsskrift. From 1882 to 1889 he was teacher in the Monrad'ske Kursus (a course named in honour to the Danish prime minister Ditlev Gothard Monrad) at Danmarks Lærerhøjskole (Denmark's Teacher's College). In 1882 he was lecturer as the polytechnic institute. From 1876 to 1883 he was assistant at the chemical laboratory of Sigfred Frederik Edvard Valdemar Stein.

Kiærskou published the scientific descriptions of several plant taxa from the families Lythraceae and Myrtaceae, in particular from Spain and Brazil. Together with Samsøe Lund he wrote a monograph about the cultivated forms of the cabbage, the beet, and the rapeseed.

This botanist is denoted by the author abbreviation Kiaersk. when citing a botanical name.

== Selected works ==
- 1884: En monografisk skildring af havekaalens, rybsens og rapsens kulturformer (with Samsøe Lund)
- 1890: Myrtaceae ex India occidentali a dominis Eggers, Krug, Sintenis, Stahl aliisque collectae
- 1893: Enumeratio Myrtacearum Brasiliensium quas collegerunt viri doctissimi Glaziou, Lund, Mendona, Raben, Reinhardt, Schenck, Warming aliique. Hauniae. Apud. Jul. Gjellerup. Ex Officina. Hoffensbergiana, 1893.
