= Prismen =

Event venue in Copenhagen, Denmark

Coordinates: 55.666444°N 12.611039°E

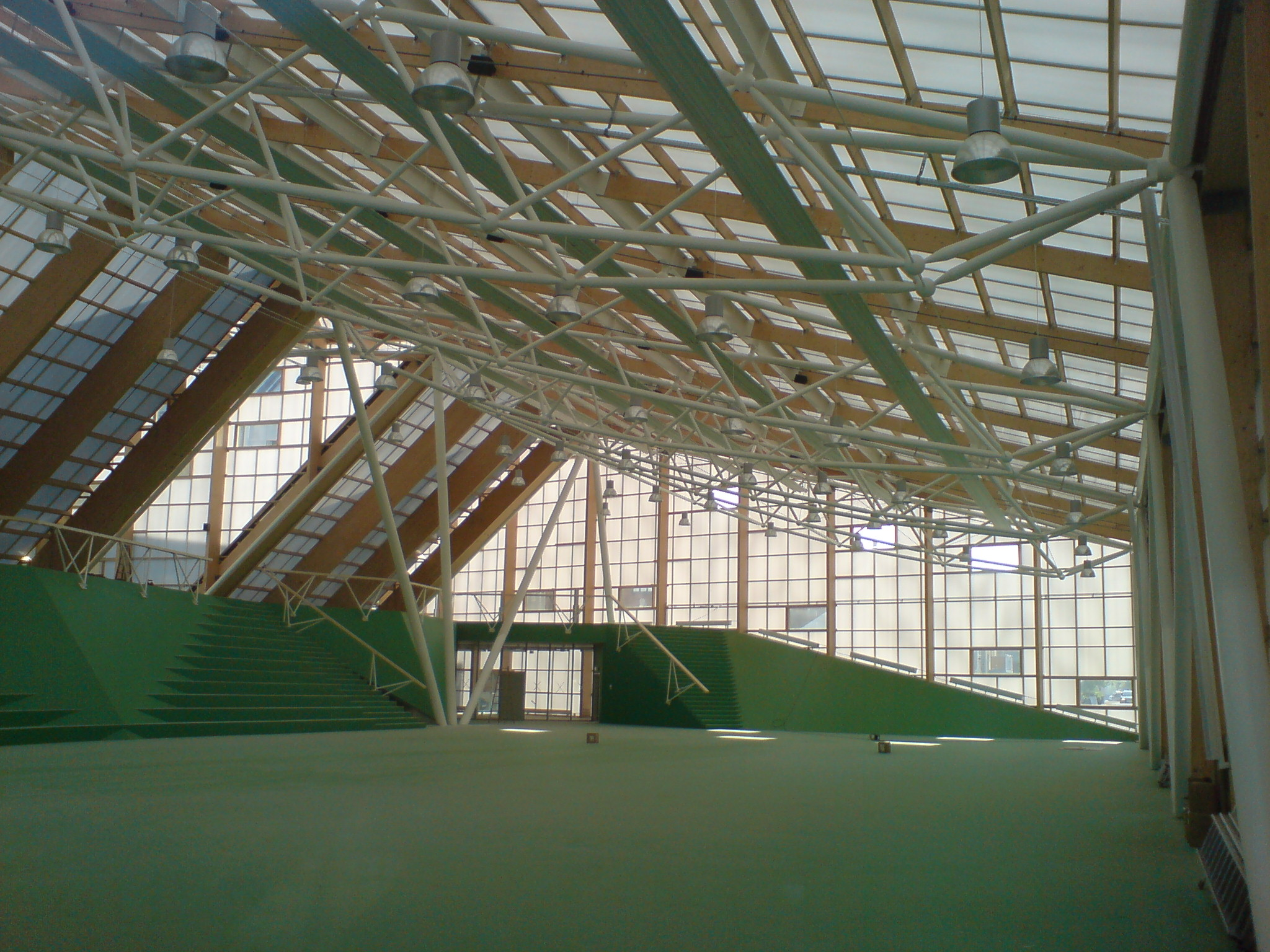
Inside Prismen

Prismen (literally "The Crystal") is a multifunctional sports and cultural venue in Holmbladsgade on Amager in Copenhagen, Denmark. It was inaugurated in 2006 to a design by Dorte Mandrup.

== Design ==
An appendage to the surrounding buildings, it has a characteristic angled form and a translucent skin of polycarbonate panels which contrasts the bricks of the surrounding buildings, let daylight into the building in the daytime and makes it glow at night.

== Facilities ==
The building has an area of 3,340 square metres and contain a large venue, a dance studio, a hall for cultural activities, four smaller rooms and a large balcony on the first floor. Other facilities include changing rooms, office space for staff and an organic café.
