= Palægade =

Street in Copenhagen, Denmark

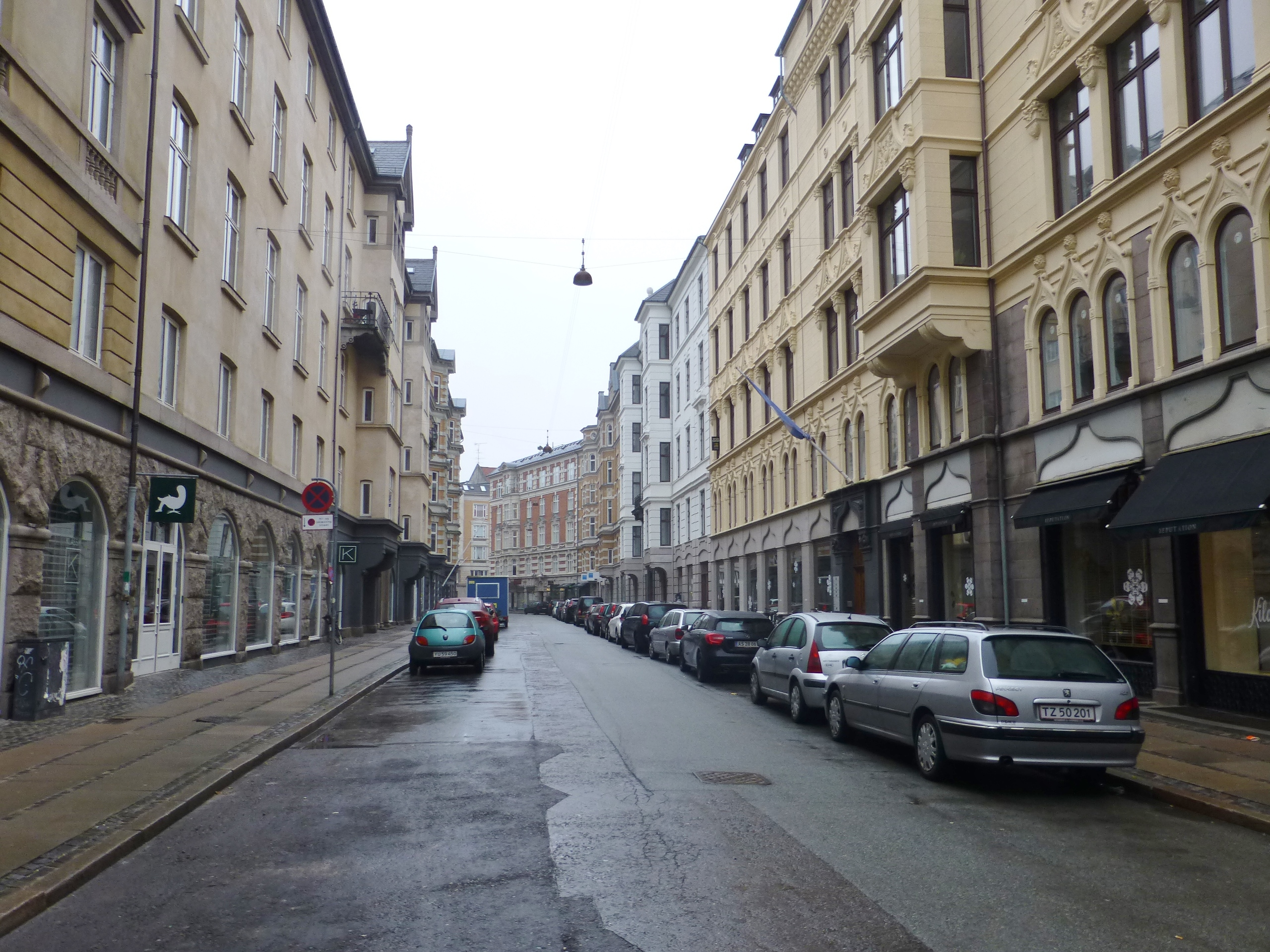
- Palægade
- Length: 149 m (489 ft)
- Location: Indre By, Copenhagen, Denmark
- Postal code: 1261
- Nearest metro station: Kongens Nytorv
- Coordinates: 55°40′54.84″N 12°35′13.56″E

Palægade (literally "Mansion Street") is a street located close to Kongens Nytorv in central Copenhagen, Denmark. It runs from Bredgade in the east to Store Kongensgade in the west.

== History ==
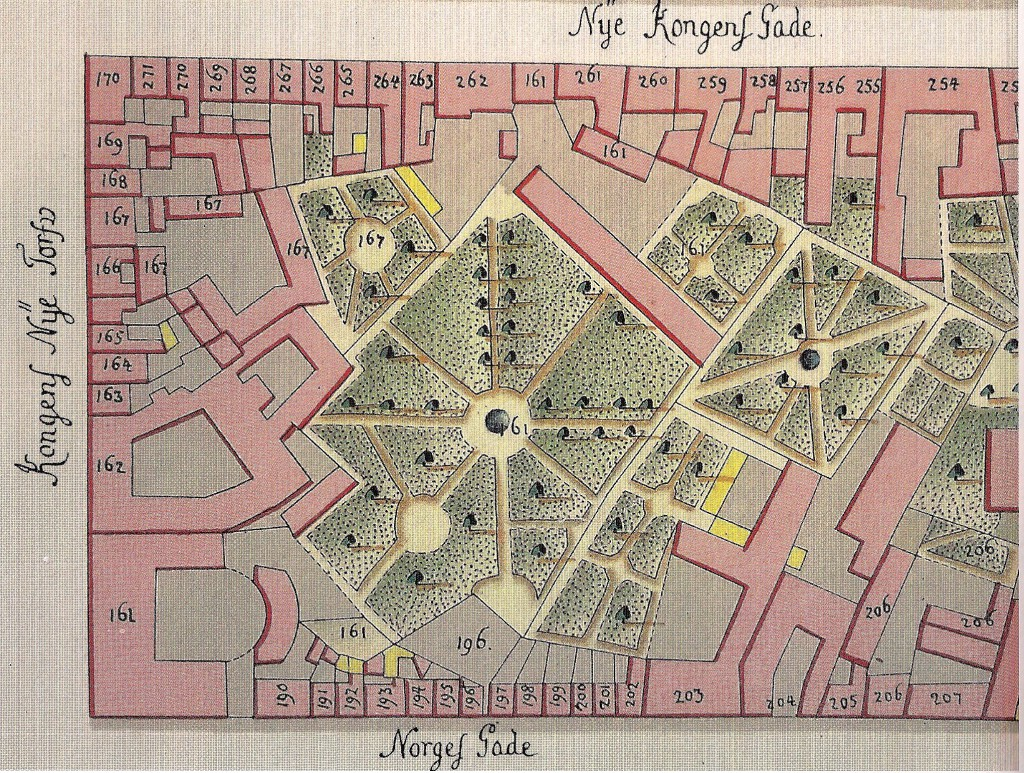
The Thott Mansion's garden seen on a map from 1757

Palægade is one of the youngest streets in central Copenhagen. It takes its name after Palæhaven, an entertainment venue which had been established in the former garden of the Thott Mansion on Kongens Nytorv in the second half of the 19th century. It was entered through a gate in a building on Bredgade. Palægade was established in the 1870s.

== Notable buildings and residents ==
The street is built over with four large properties all of which have been designed in the Historicist style with ample use of decorative elements and bay windows. The two buildings on the corners with Bredgade were designed by Emil Blichfeldt on collaboration with Gotfred Tvede. Built in 1899–1900, No. 1–3 has granite rustication on the ground floor and the corner is tipped by a small spire. The building at the opposite corner (No. 2–4) is from 1800–02. A stucco dragon above the door at the corner carries a round turnet tipped by a copper spire. Small dragons also flank the other doors in the building. The two buildings in the Store Kongensgade end of the street were designed by Philip Smidth.

The Galleri Jules Julian art gallery is located at No. 7.

== Image gallery ==
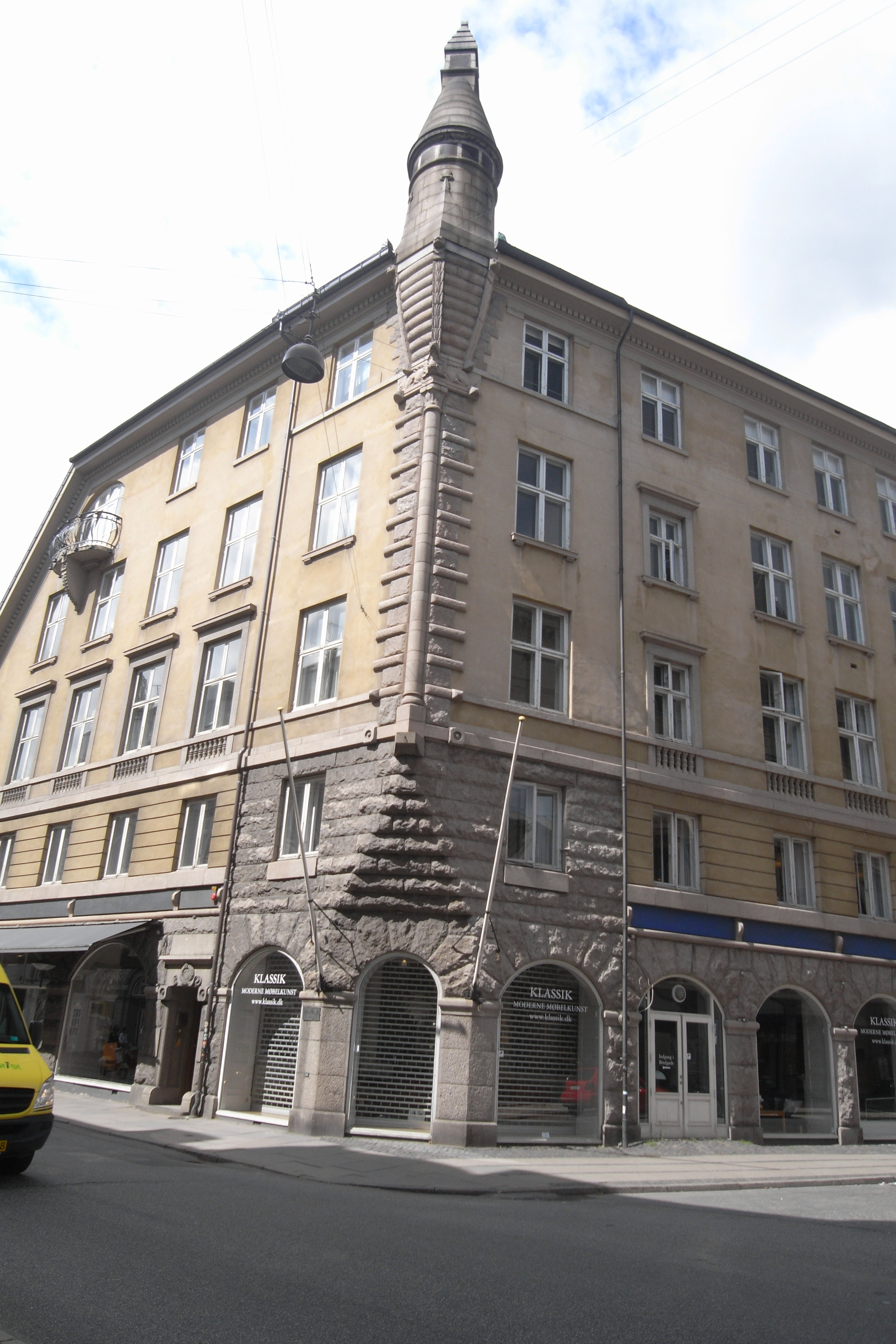
No. 1

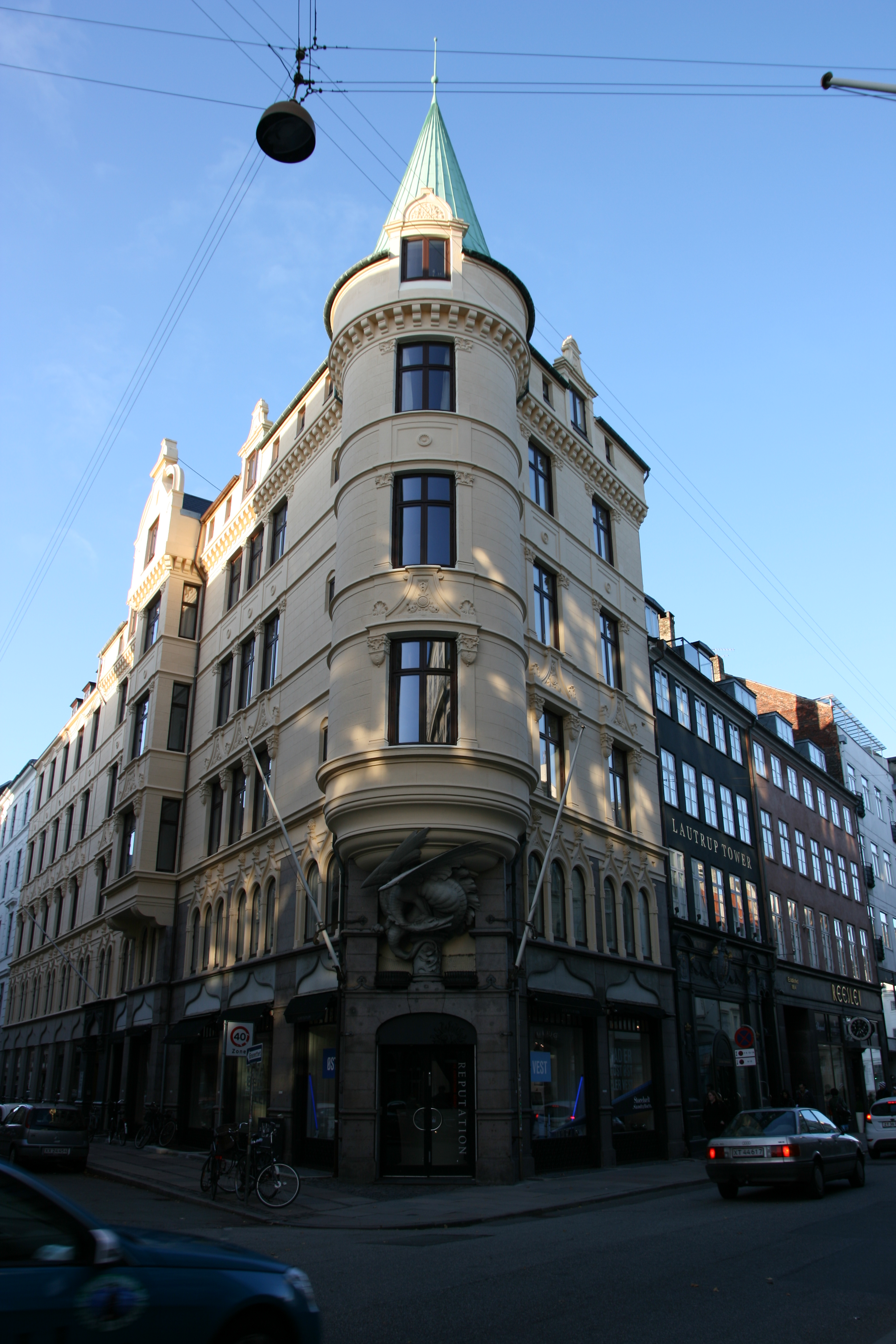
Palægade 2–4

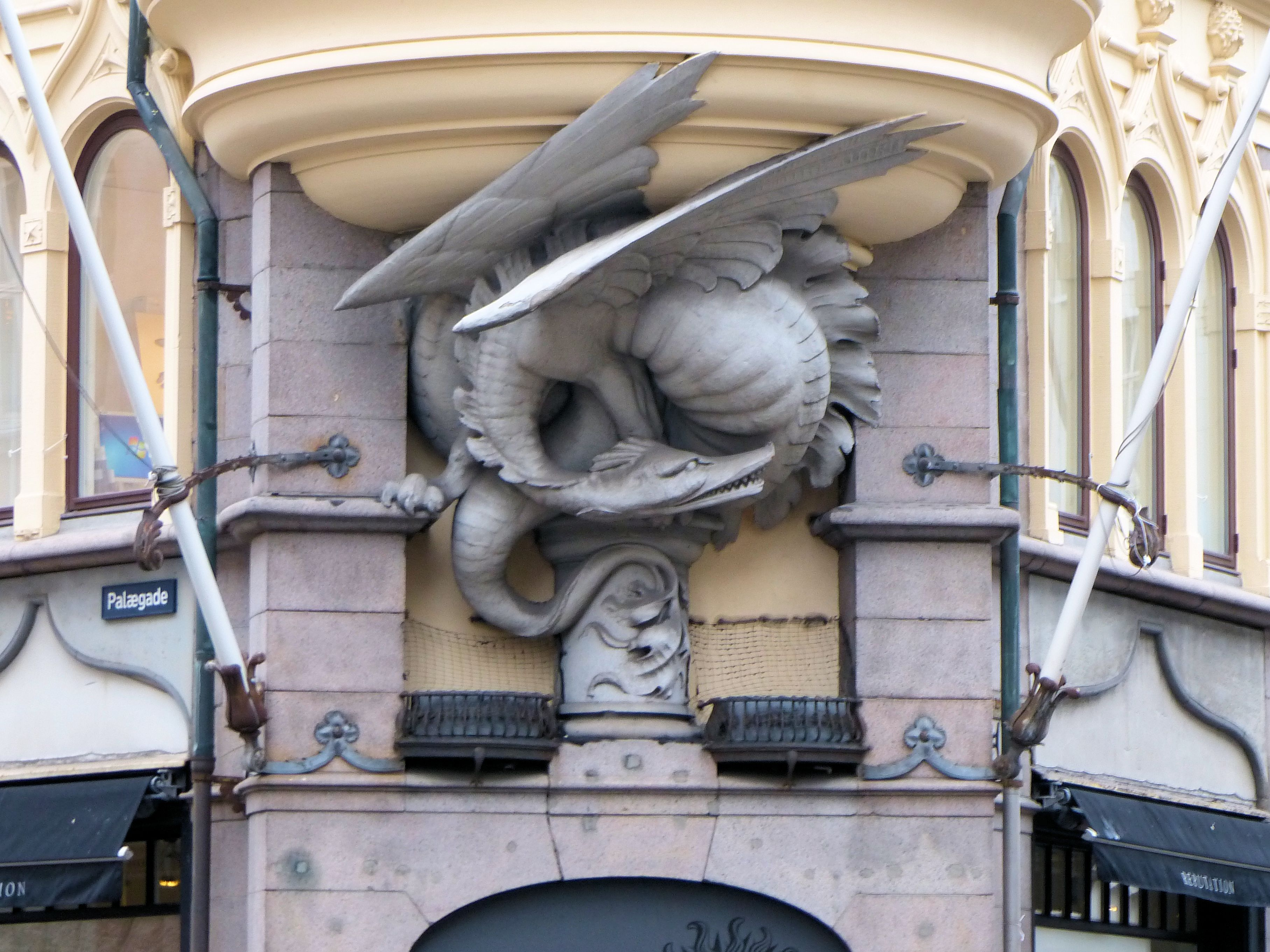
Close-up of the dragon on No. 2

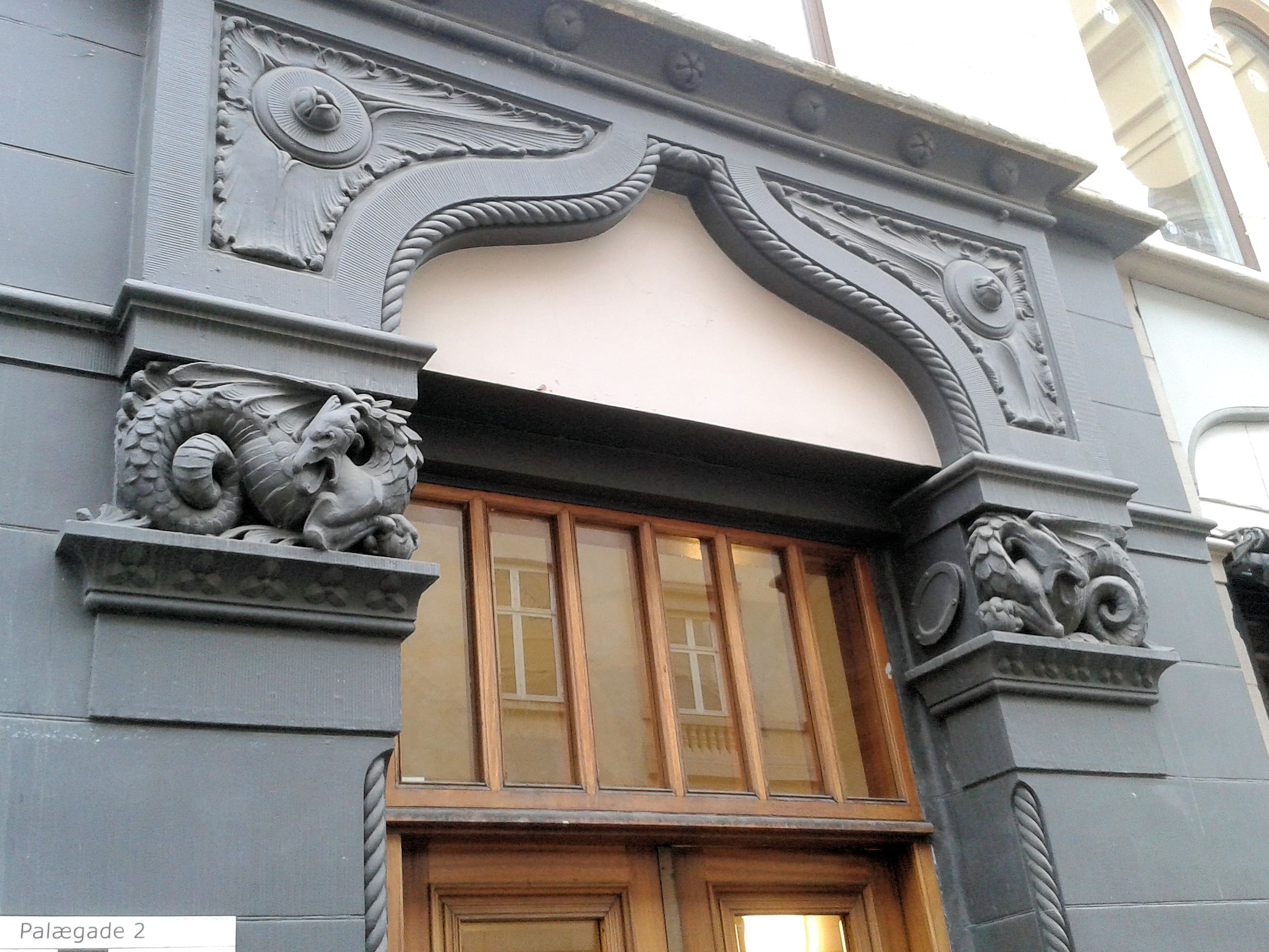
Two dragons guarding the door at No. 2
