= Dorte Mandrup =

Danish architect (born 1961)

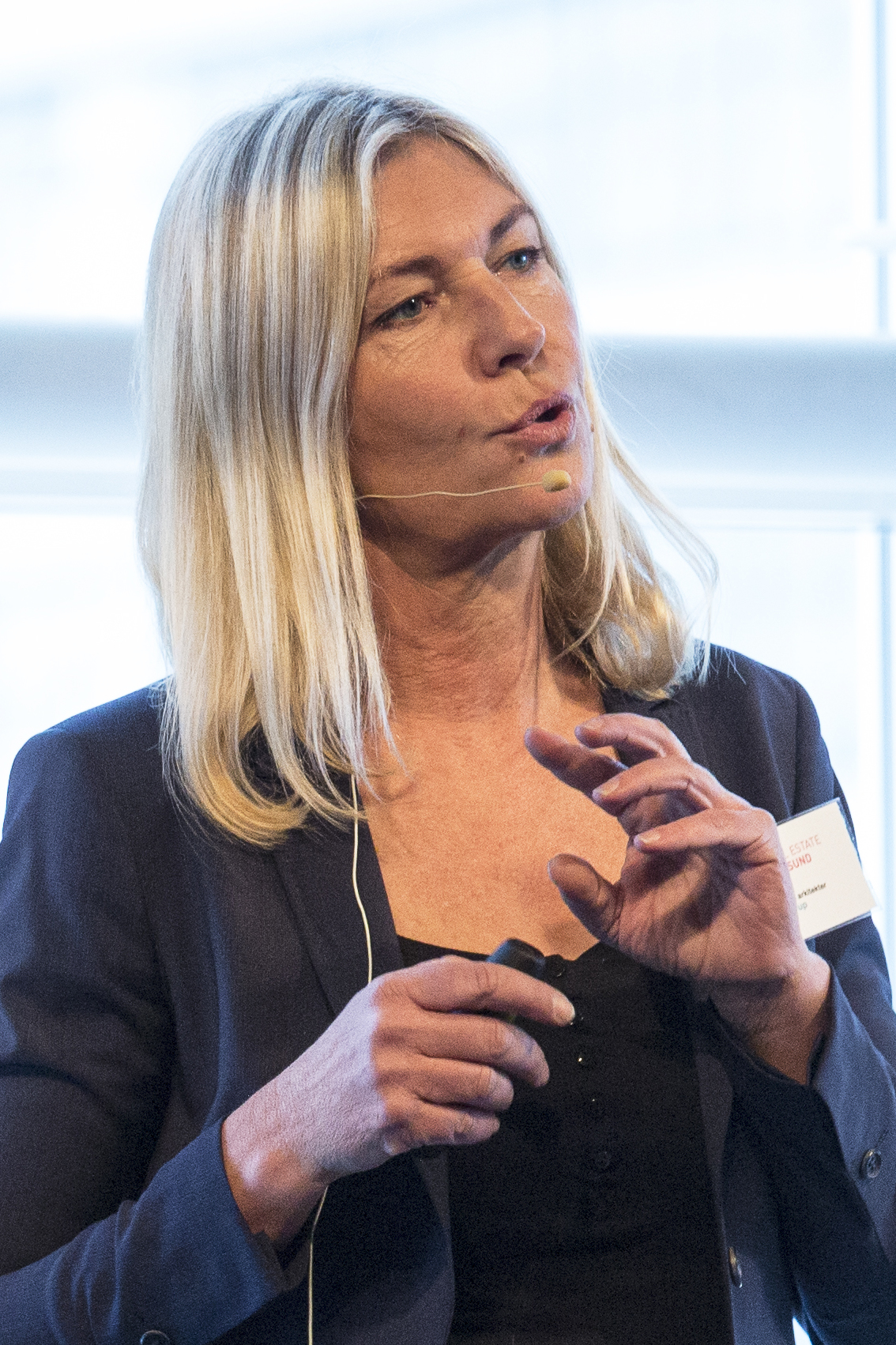
- Mandrup in 2015
- Born: 26 July 1961 (age 65)
- Occupation: Architect
- Practice: Dorte Mandrup A/S

Dorte Mandrup-Poulsen (born 28 July 1961) is a Danish architect. Founder and Creative Director of the architectural practice Dorte Mandrup Arkitekter A/S that has approximately 80 employees. The practice is based in Copenhagen, Denmark and has designed several internationally acclaimed buildings.

Dorte Mandrup’s work is characterized by being conceptually strong as well as innovative in terms of form and material, but also by an analytical approach to architecture.

Dorte Mandrup is behind the Wadden Sea Centre at the Danish west coast, the Icefjord Centre by the UNESCO trail in Ilulissat in Greenland, and most recently Danish clothing company Bestseller’s upcoming mixed use development in Brande, which has already received attention due to its plans of building a more than 200-metre-tall (660 ft) tower, thereby becoming Denmark’s tallest building.

In 2017, Dorte Mandrup caused an international stir with her opinion piece ”I am not a female architect. I am an architect” in Dezeen, in which she discussed gender politics within the world of architecture.

She was also winner of the Berlin Art Prize 2019, architecture division.

Mandrup serves on the board of the Louisiana Museum of Modern Art and is a member of the Historic Buildings Council.

In 2022, Dorte Mandrup joined the jury of The Daylight Award.

== Biography ==
Dorte Mandrup graduated from the Aarhus School of Architecture in 1991. From 1991–92 she studied sculpture and ceramics at the G.S.C Art Department in the United States. She then went to work for Henning Larsen Architects for a few years before, in 1995, co-founding Fuglsang & Mandrup-Poulsen with Niels Fuglsang. This firm was eventually split in 1999 when Mandrup set up her current practice, Dorte Mandrup A/S. It was founded on 30 June 1999 and is based in Copenhagen.

In April 2019, Dorte Mandrup headed the jury of the 2019 European Union Prize for Contemporary Architecture – Mies van der Rohe Award.

On 1 November 2019, Mandrup won a competition arranged by The Whale AS for designing an attraction to be built on the Norwegian island of Andøya, 300 km north of the Arctic Circle. Her design resembles a whale but also presents a slope which visitors will be able to climb for a view over the sea, the mountains and the Northern Lights.

== Selected buildings ==
=== Completed ===
- Hangar H (renovation), Holmen, Copenhagen (2001 and 2011)
- Holmbladsgade Cultural Centre, Copenhagen (2001)
- Day-Care Centre in Skanderborggade, Copenhagen, Denmark (2005)
- Jægersborg Water Tower conversion, Gentofte, Denmark (2005)
- Prismen, Copenhagen, Denmark (2006)
- Reading Nest, Asserbo, Denmark (2008)
- Youth Recreation and Culture Centre in Gersonsvej, Copenhagen, Denmark (2008)
- St. Nicolai Cultural Centre, Kolding, Denmark (2008)
- Bordings Independent School extension, Østerbro, Copenhagen, Denmark (2009)
- Community centre Herstedlund, Copenhagen, Denmark (2009)
- Lange Eng Cohousing Community, Albertslund, Denmark (2009)
- Munkegaard School extension, Gentofte, Denmark (completed 2009)
- Råå Förskola, Sweden (2013)
- Ama'r Children's Culture House, Copenhagen, Denmark (2014)
- Valencia Building, Copenhagen, Denmark (2015)
- Ikea Hubhult, Malmö, Sweden (2015)
- Sundbyøster Hall, Copenhagen, Denmark (2015)
- Sallingtårnet, Aarhus, Denmark (2015)
- The Wadden Sea Centre, Denmark (2017)

=== In progress ===
- IKEA Copenhagen, Copenhagen, Denmark (expected 2019)
- Icefiord Centre, Greenland (competition win, June 2016)
- Bestselleter Tower, Brande, Denmark

== Awards ==
- 2003 Dreyer Honorary Award
- 2007 Nykredit Architecture Prize
- 2014 WAN Education Award ('Built' category) for Ama'r Children's Culture House
- 2015 WAN Mixed-Use Award for Sundbyøster Hall
- 2016 Träpriset for Råå Day Care Center
- 2016 Gröna Lansen - 2015, IKEA Hubhult Global Meeting Centre, Sweden
- 2016 WAN Metal in Architecture Award 2016, Salling Tower
- 2016 Honorary Award, Danish National Bank Jubilee Fund, awarded in recognition of the recipient's contribution and works
- 2017 Green Good Design Award, The Chicago Athenaeum, the world's leading sustainable design awards
- 2017 The Art, Design and Architecture Award of the Year, Dir. Einar Hansen and wife Vera Hansen Foundation
- 2017 ”Byggeri” – Magazine, Building of the Year, Wadden Sea Centre
- 2017 City of Esbjerg’s City-Fund Award 2017, Wadden Sea Centre
- 2017 Breeam Building of the year of Sweden Green Building Awards 2017, IKEA Hubhult Global Meeting Centre, Sweden
- 2019 Berlin Art Prize of architecture division

== Gallery ==
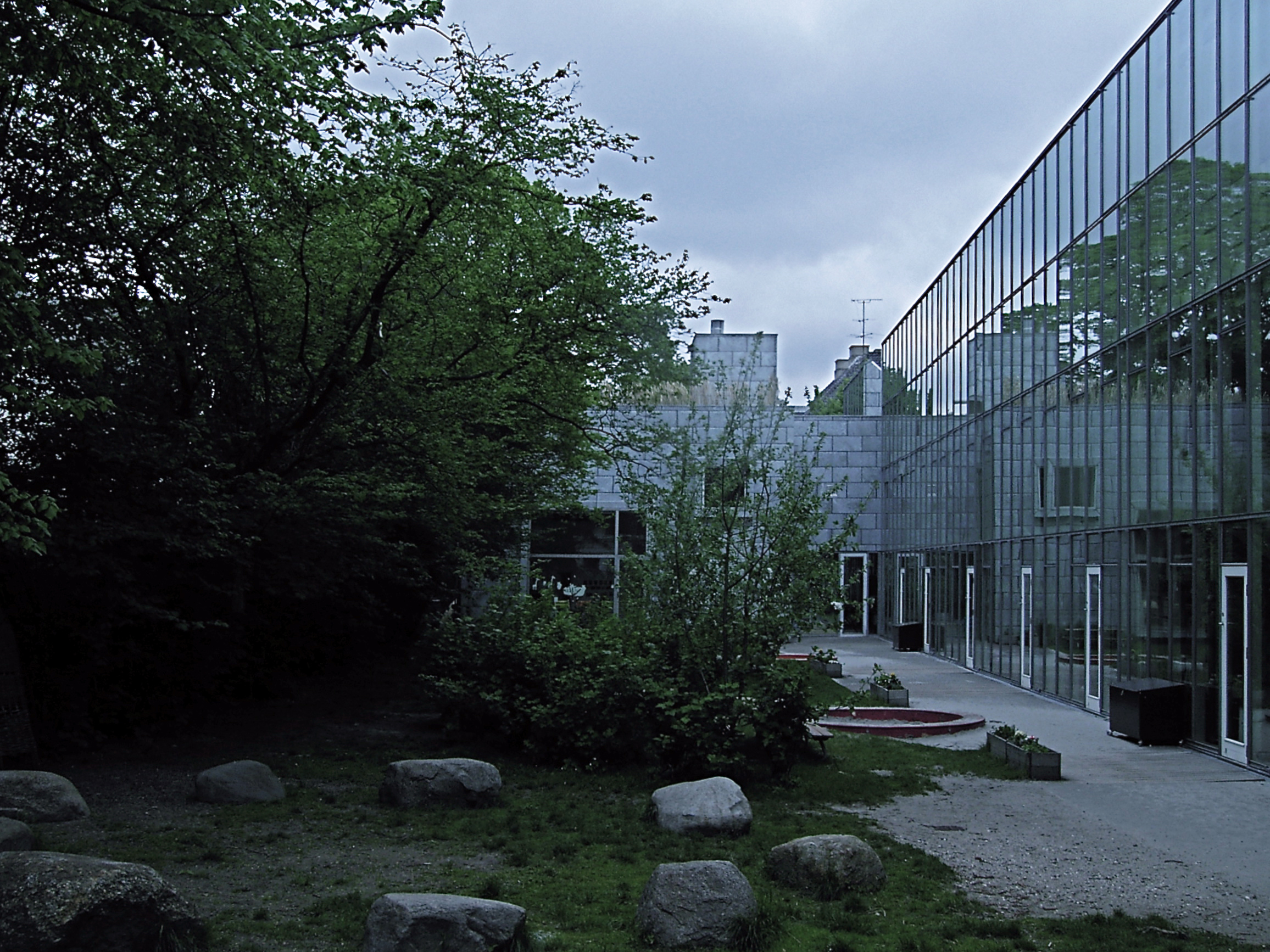
Næstvedgade kindergarten, Copenhagen (2004)

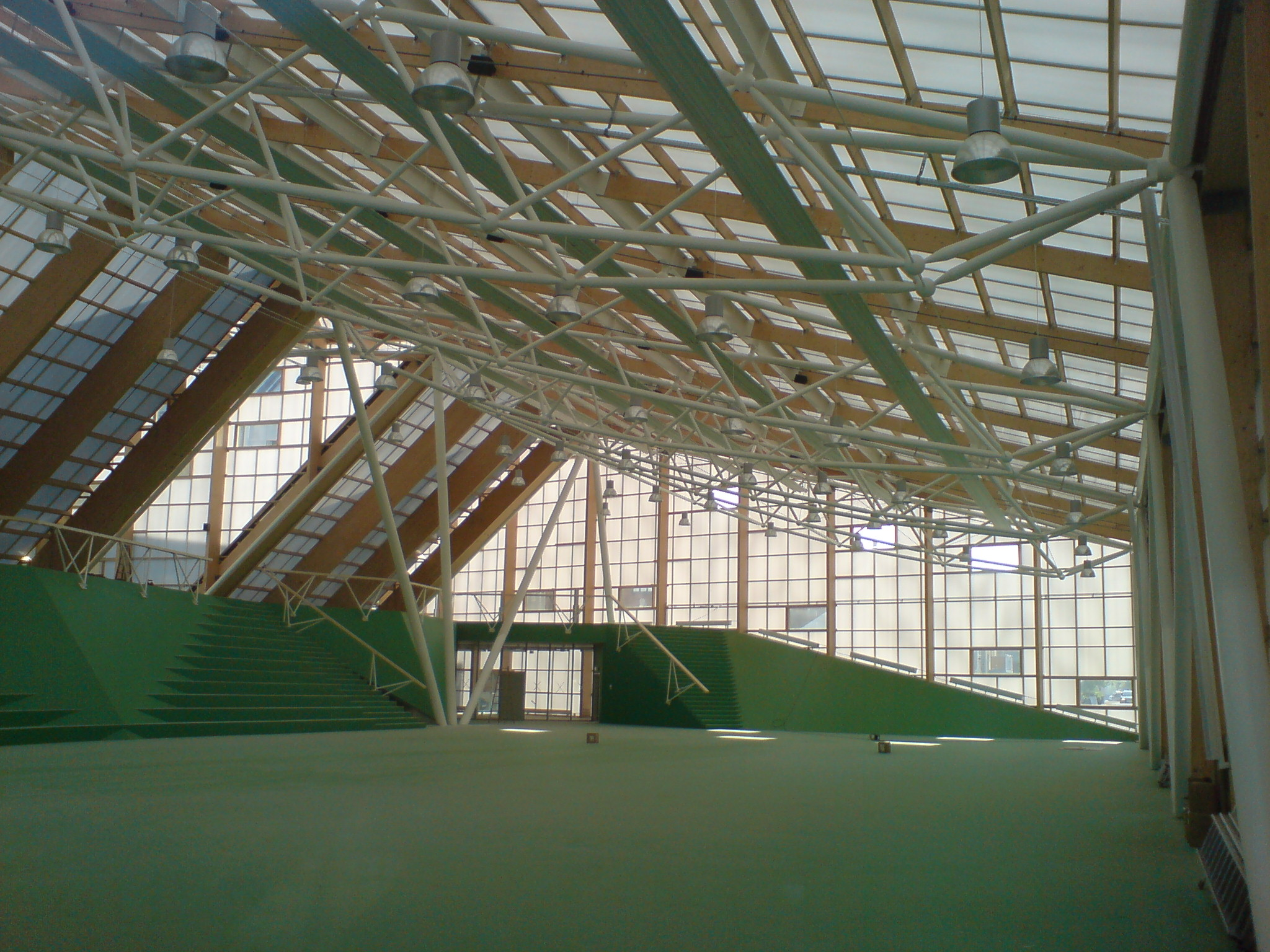
Prismen sports venue, Copenhagen (2006)

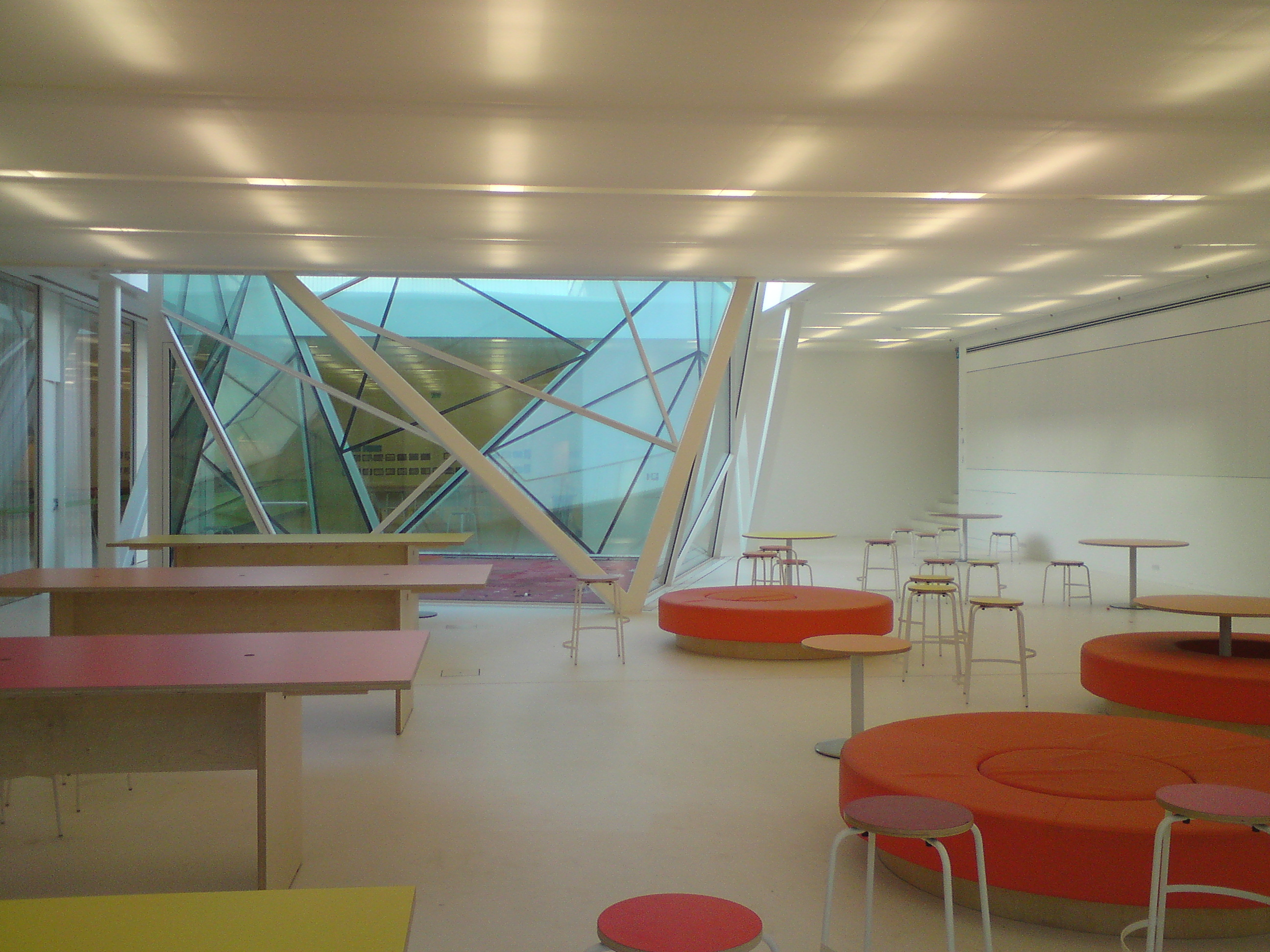
Munkegaard School extension (2009)

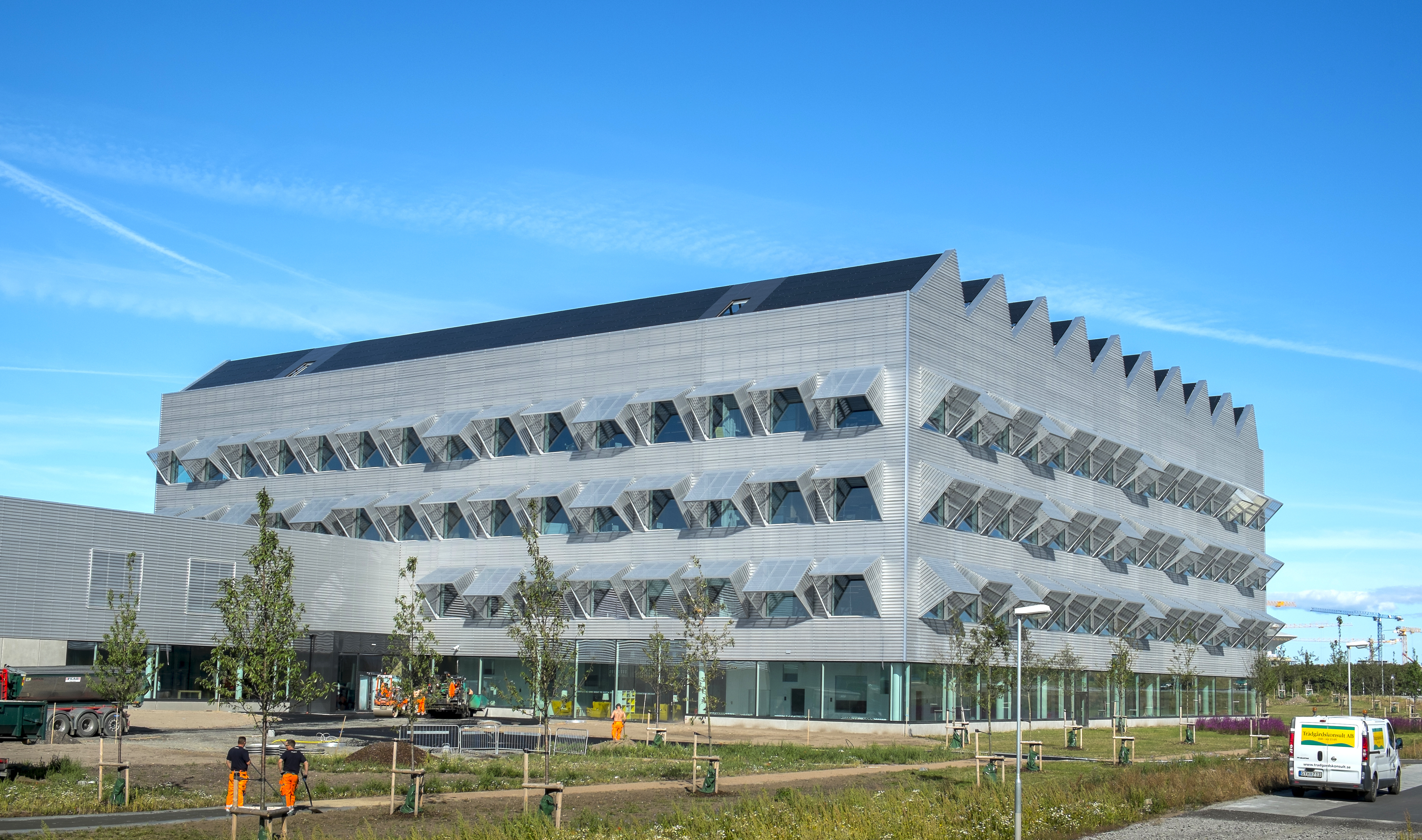
IKEA Hubhult, Malmö (2015)

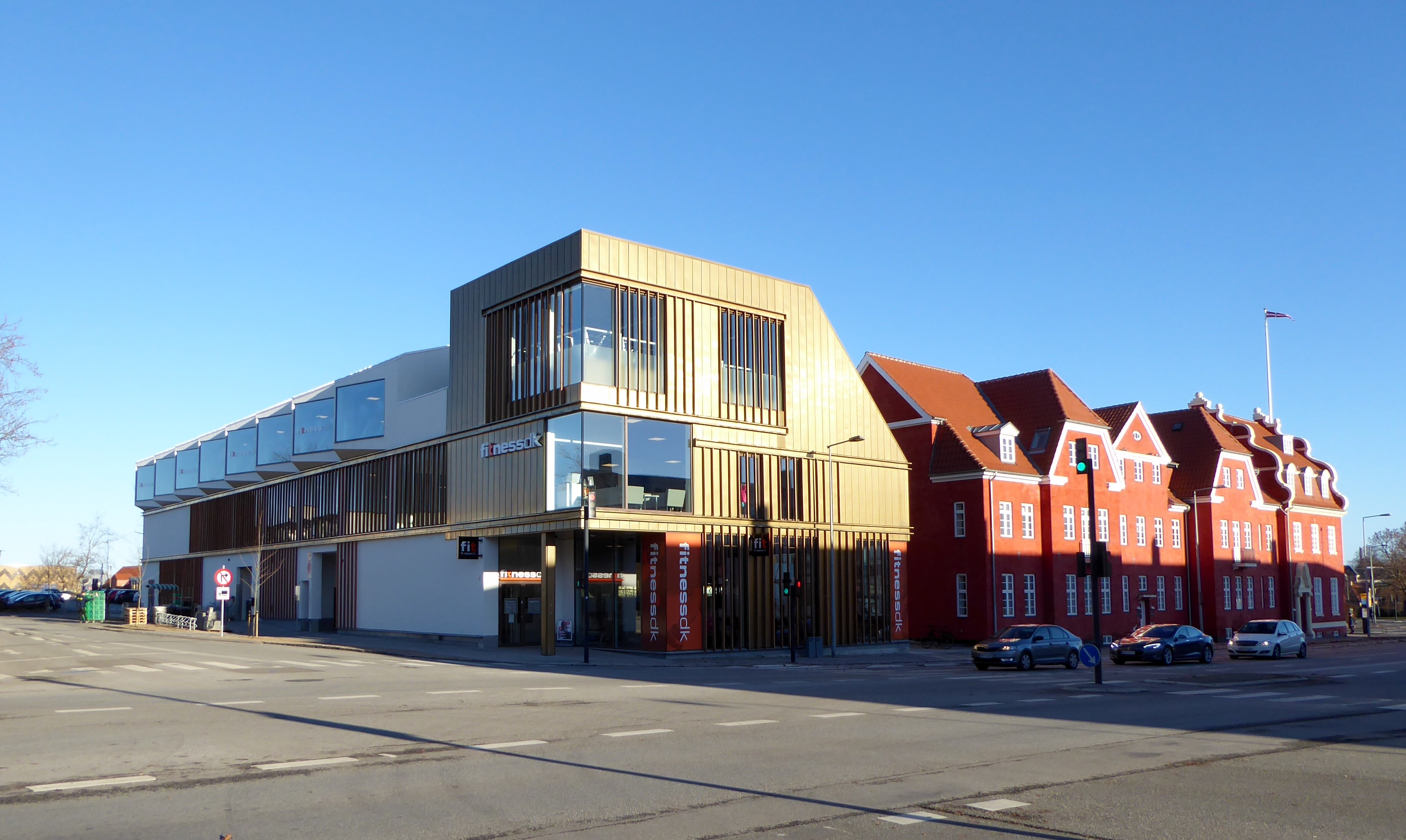
Hørsholm building

== See also ==
- Architecture of Denmark
