= Frederik Christian Kiærskou =

Danish painter (1805–1891)

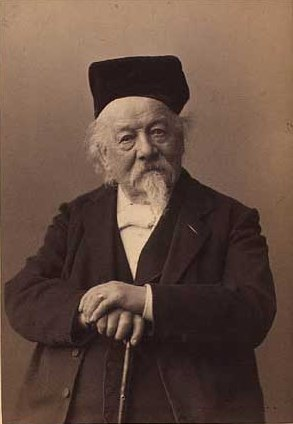
F.C. Kiærskou; photograph by Hansen, Schou & Weller (c.1890).

Frederik Christian Jakobsen Kiærskou, a.k.a. F. C. Kiærskou (26 March 1805 – 6 June 1891) was a Danish landscape painter.

== Biography ==
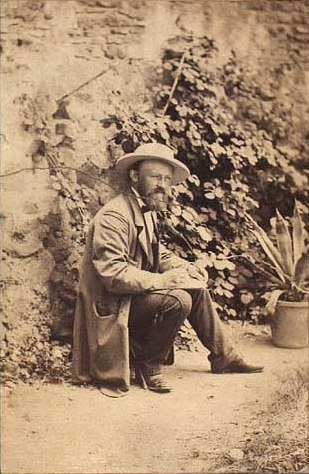
In the field, sketching

Kiærskou was born in Copenhagen, Denmark. His father was a clerk in the Police Court (Politiret). He lost both parents at the age of nine and was placed an orphanage (Det Kongelige Vajsenhus), which also provided an elementary education. After his confirmation, he began taking classes in ornamental painting at the Royal Danish Academy of Fine Arts.

He continued to take advanced classes at the Academy and, in 1827, set himself up as a decorative painter. He was married that same year, to Ida Gindrup (1802–1880). In 1830, he returned to the Academy for more training and was awarded several cash prizes for landscape painting. By 1837, the Academy was willing to recommend him for funding by the "Fonden ad usus publicos", but he chose to wait. The fund had been created by King Frederick V of Denmark in 1765 to promote the arts and sciences.

In 1840, he apparently borrowed money from a brother to travel to Germany and in 1842, gained a travel scholarship from the Academy and the support of Danish Prime Minister Adam Wilhelm Moltke. When he returned from Munich in 1843, he was able to sell some paintings to Moltke and the Kunstforeningen. He became a member of the Academy in 1845 and a corresponding member of the Royal Swedish Academy of Arts in 1848 for his work on a popular book of Swedish landscapes, published by Albert Bonniers förlag.

In 1863, he painted a landscape that featured Bernstorff Palace as a bridal gift for Princess Alexandra upon her marriage to the then Princes of Wales, later King Edward VII of the United Kingdom. From 1865, he was the supervisor (conservator) at the Moltkeske Painting Collection and from 1867 he was a painter in residence at Charlottenborg Palace. In 1874, he was appointed Knight of the Order of the Dannebrog.

Always in excellent health, he suddenly died in Copenhagen at the age of eighty-six. His son, Hjalmar Kiærskou was a noted botanist. His daughter, Hanne Joachimine Unna, was a landscape painter who spent much of her life in South America.

== Selected paintings ==
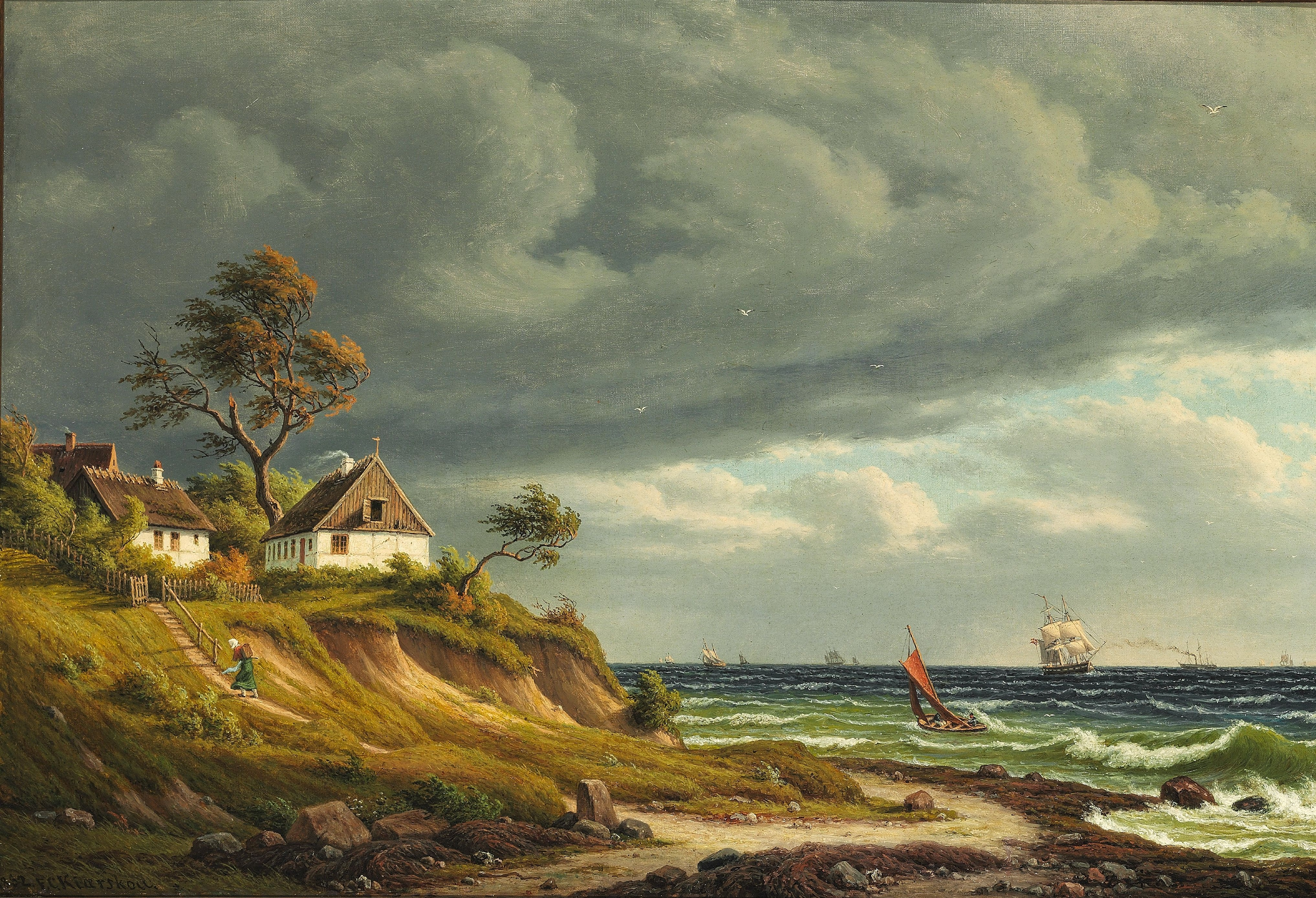
View of the fishing village Sletten. Brisk gale
(1882)

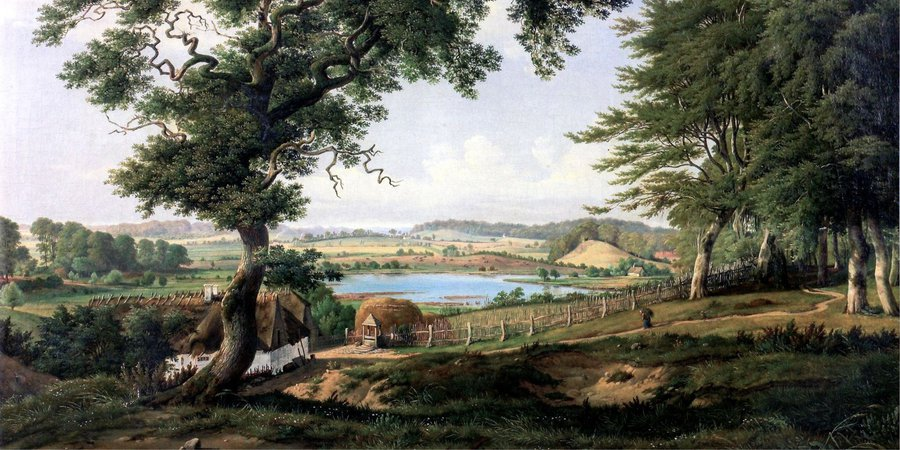
View of Rundforbi in Nærum
(1834)

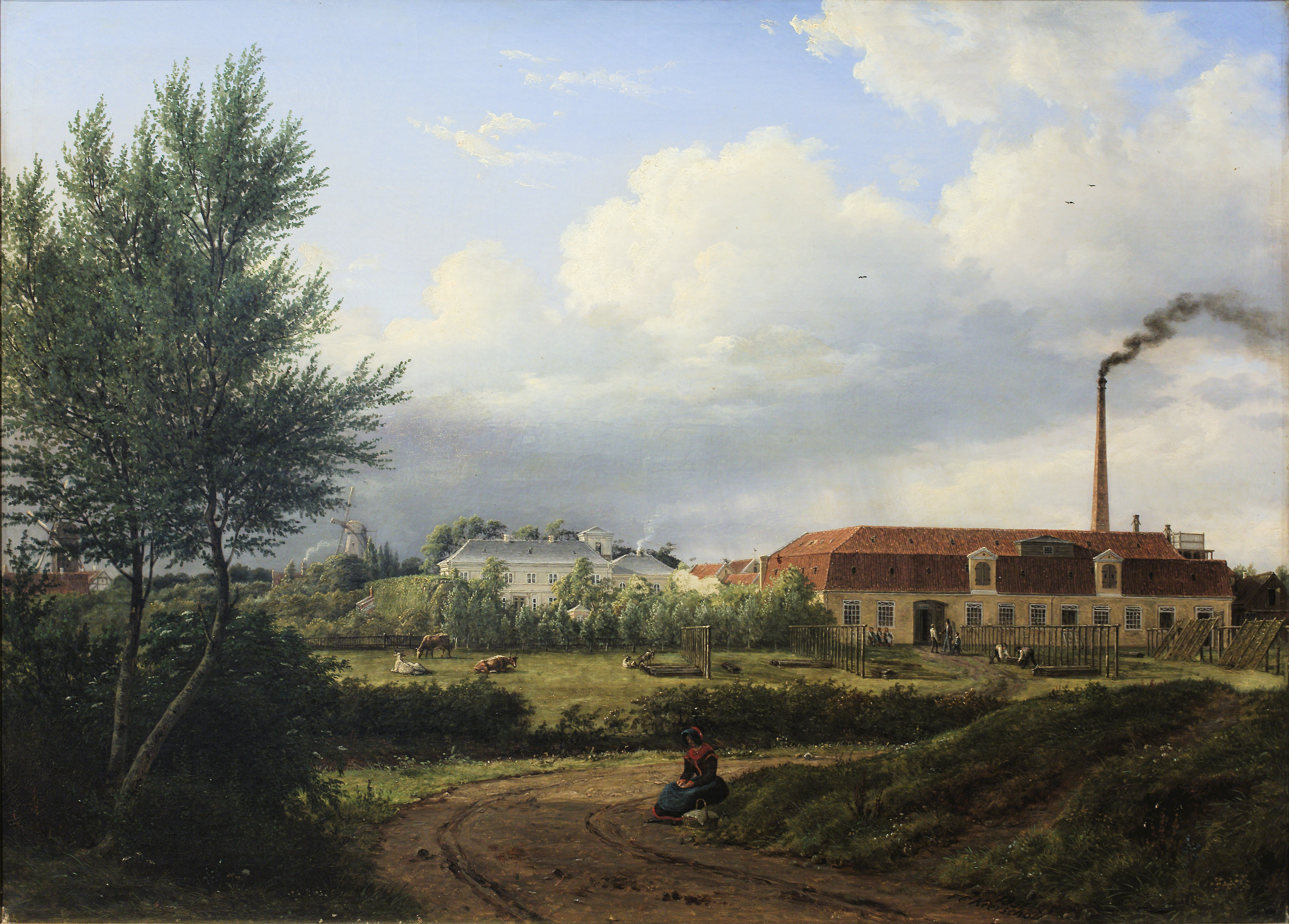
View of Amager with L.P. Holmblad's
Candle Factory
(1851)
