= Stokhusgade =

Street in Copenhagen, Denmark

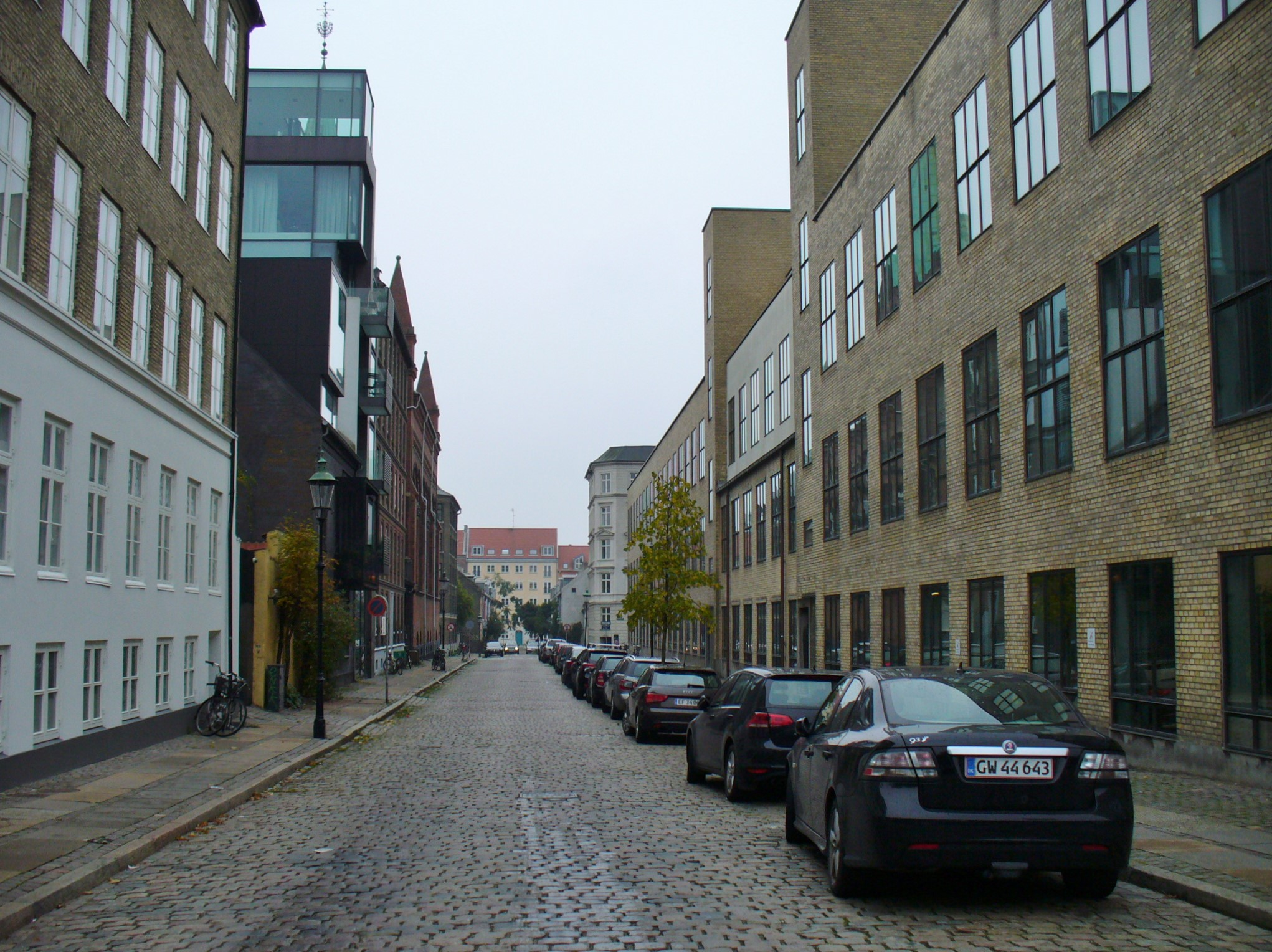
- Interactive map of Stokhusgade
- Length: 125 m (410 ft)
- Location: Copenhagen, Denmark
- Quarter: City Centre
- Postal code: 1317
- Nearest metro station: Østerport
- Coordinates: 55°41′20.11″N 12°34′59.05″E
- Southeast end: Rigensgade
- Northwest end: Øster Voldgade

Stokhusgade (lit. "Stocks House Street") is a cobbled, one-way street in central Copenhagen, Denmark, linking Rigensgade in the southeast with Øster Voldgade in the northwest. The street takes its name after the Copenhagen Stocks House which was located at the site from 1741 to 1851. The College of Advanced Technology's former buildings occupy the entire southwestern side of the street.

== History ==
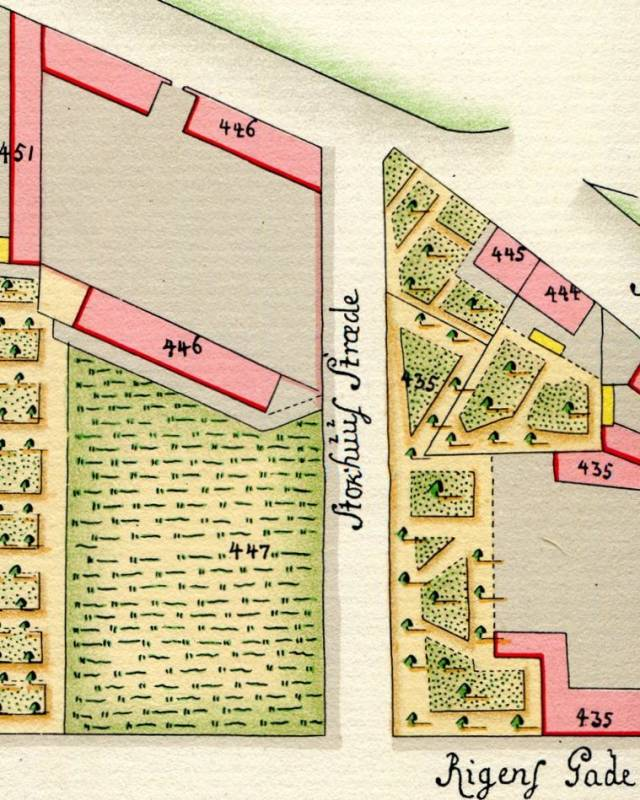
Stokhusstræde seen on Gedde's district map of St. Ann's Western Quarter

Stokhusgade originates in the 1649 plan for New Copenhagen, the large area which was included in the fortified city when the old East Rampart along present day Gothersgade was decommissioned and a new one was built in a more northerly direction.

Part of a group of streets named after minerals from Norway, then ruled from Denmark, it was originally called Stenkulsgade (Black Coal Street).

In 1741 the Copenhagen Stocks House relocated to a new building on the west side of the street. Originally a military prison, it was now also opened to civilian prisoners. The name referred to the stocks in which the prisoners were placed. Each prison cell contained up to 50 prisoners. The street is on Gedde's Map of 1757 referred to as Stokhusstræde.

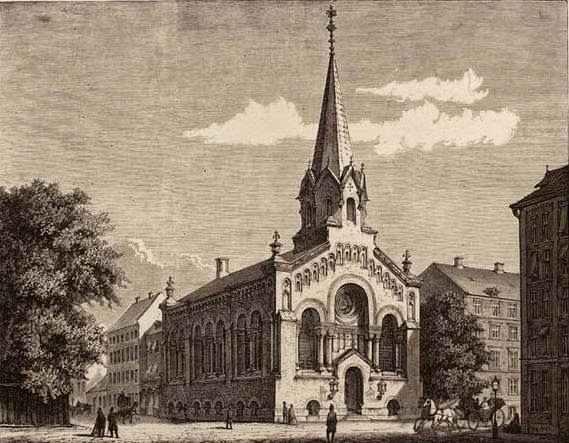
St. Mark's Church

Nyboder Materialgård, a storage facility associated with Nyboder, was located at the corner with Rigensgade. It was in 1799 replaced by Søetatens Sejldugsfabrik, a naval ship sails manufactury, which closed in 1849. St. Mark's Church, the first Methodist church in the city, opened at the site in 1866.

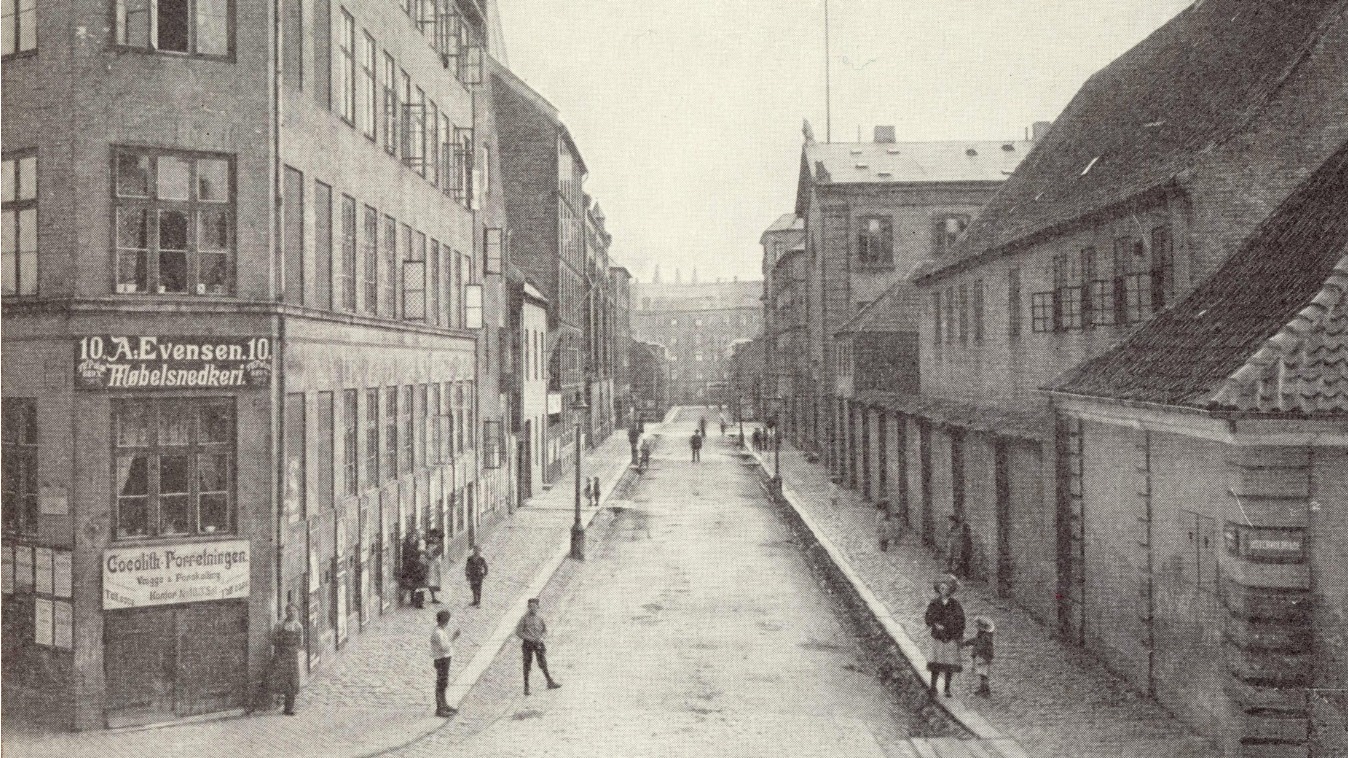
Stokhusgade

The Copenhagen Stocks House closed in 1851. In 1862, residents in the street filed a formal request for a renaming of the street since they were unhappy about being associated with the inmates in the former correctional facility but this never happened.

In the 1930s the former prison buildings and the other buildings on that side of the street were demolished to make way for a new home for the College of Advanced Technology.

== Buildings ==
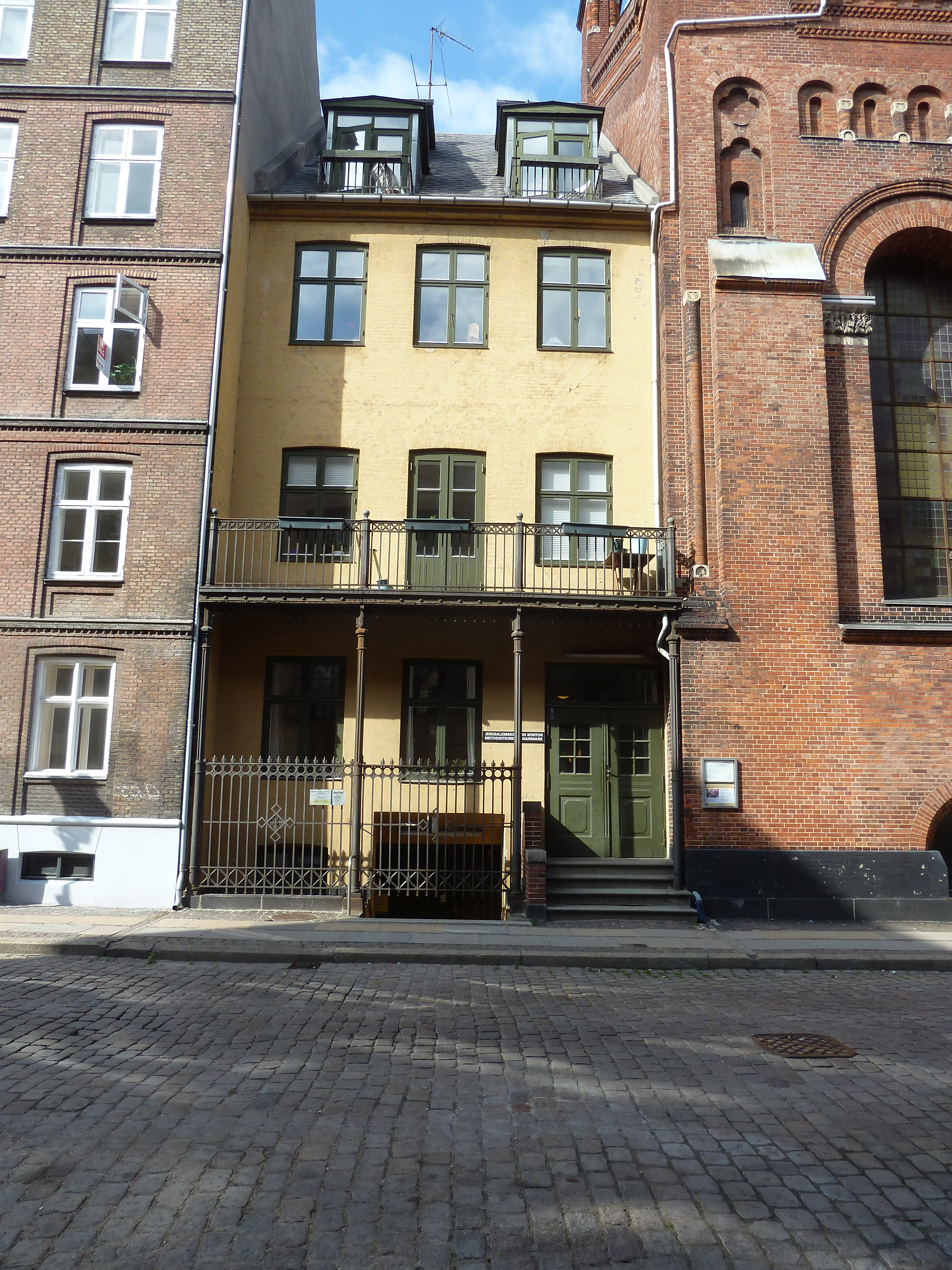
No. 2: The church office of the Jerusalem Church

The College of Advanced Technology's former building(No. 1-5) was designed by Oluf Gjerløv-Knudsen (1892–1980). It is now home to Gefion Gymnasium and ´the Geological Survey of Denmark and Greenland.

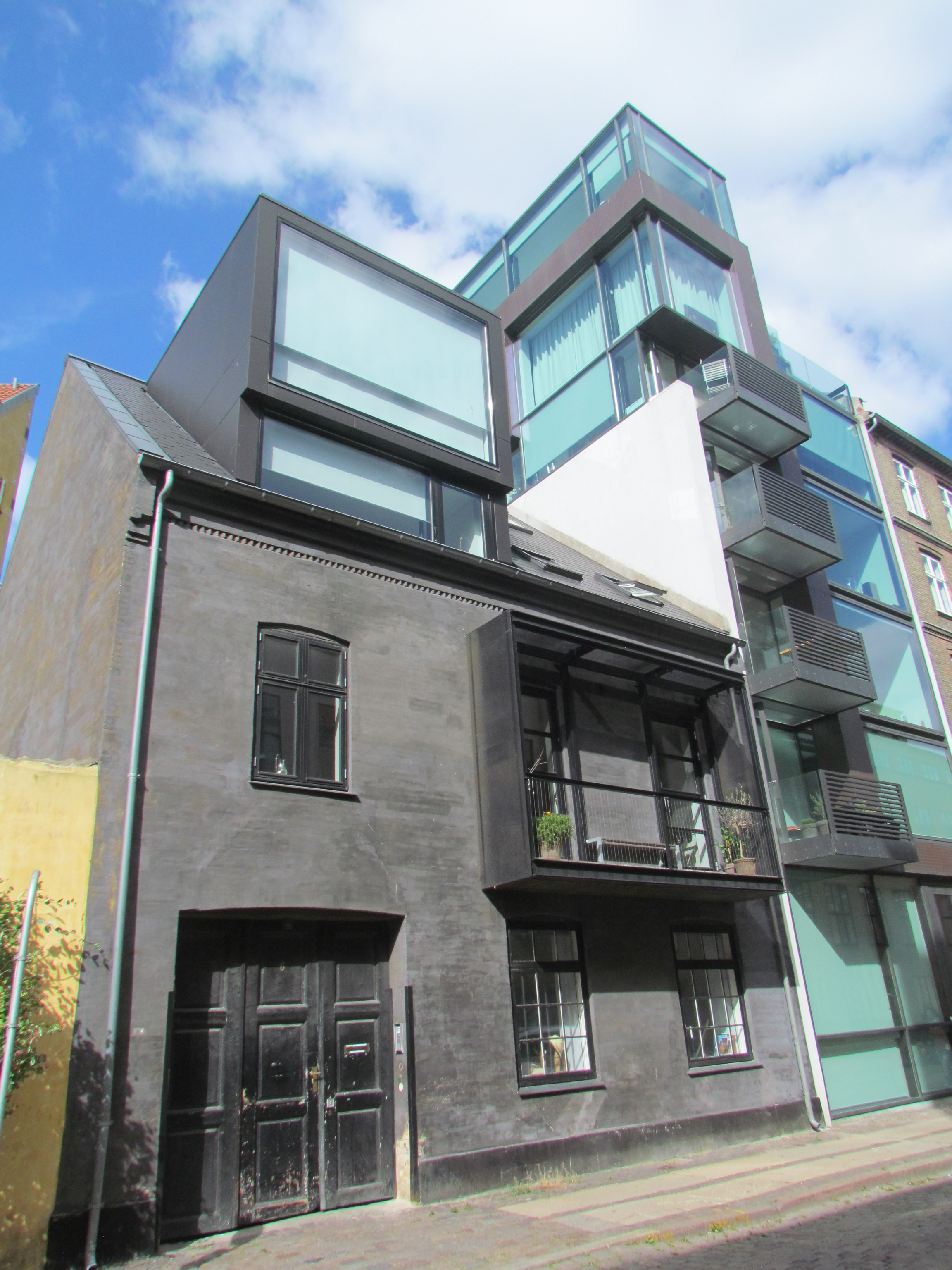
No. 4B: The Niels Holscher House

The Jerusalem Church replaced the original St. Mark's Church after a fire in the 1910s. The first church was designed by Ferdinand Vilhelm Jensen. The new one was built to a slightly modified and somewhat larger design by Jens Christian Kofoed. The small four-storey building next to the church (MN. 2) is from 1866. It contains the church office.

The small building at No. 4B has by Holsher Nordberg Architects been expanded with a seven-storey residential infill on the very narrow site of just seven metres. The building was built as the private home of Holsher Nordberg Architects-partner Nils Holscher.

The building at the corner of Øster Voldgade (Stokhusgade 8 / Øster Voldgade 12) is a former tobacco factory built for Wilhelm Frimann Schram in 1850.

== Commemorative plaque ==
A plaque on the corner of Stokhusgade and ØsterVoldgade commemorates that Icelandic scholar and politician Jón Sigurðsson used to live at Øster Voldgade 12.

== Transport ==
The northwestern end of the street is located approximately midway between Østerport (500 m) and Nørreport (700 m) station.

Stokhusgade and Krussemyntegade are One-way streets in opposite directions (towards Rigensgade), eliminating through traffic.

== In media and culture ==
In October 2009, Oprah Winfrey visited the Nils Holscher House at No. 4B in a programme sent from Copenhagen. The building has also been featured in the DTK programme Arkitekternes hjem ("The Architect's Home").
