= Garrison Hospital, Copenhagen =

Former military hospital in Denmark

Coordinates: 55.6875°N 12.5825°E

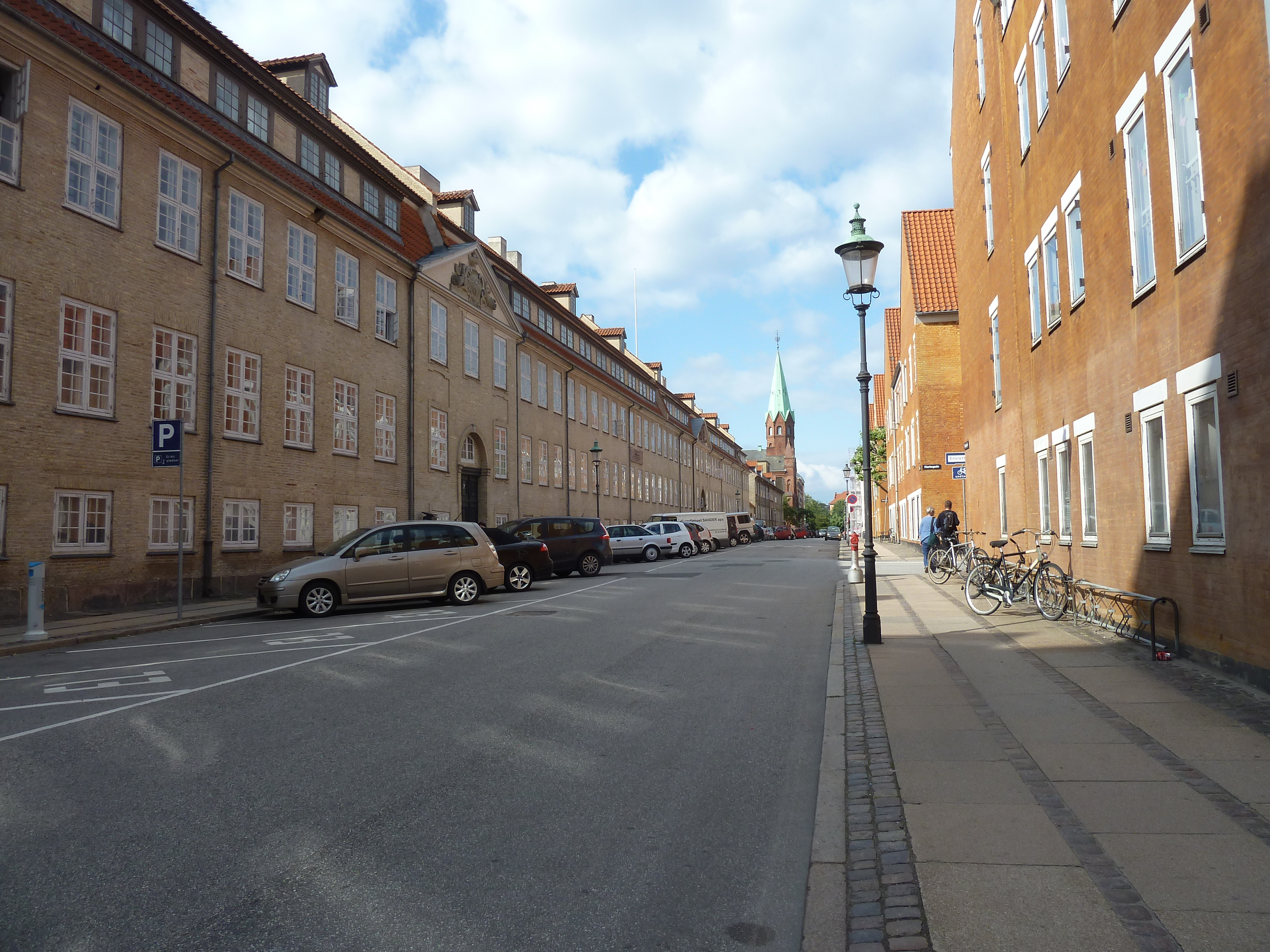
The building in Rigensgade

The Garrison Hospital (Danish: Garnisons Sygehus) is a former military hospital in Rigensgade in the Old Town of Copenhagen, Denmark. It existed from 1818 to 1928 but its 48 bays long Neoclassical building predates it and was Originally a royal textile factory. It now contains residences for officers in the Royal Danish Army.

== History ==
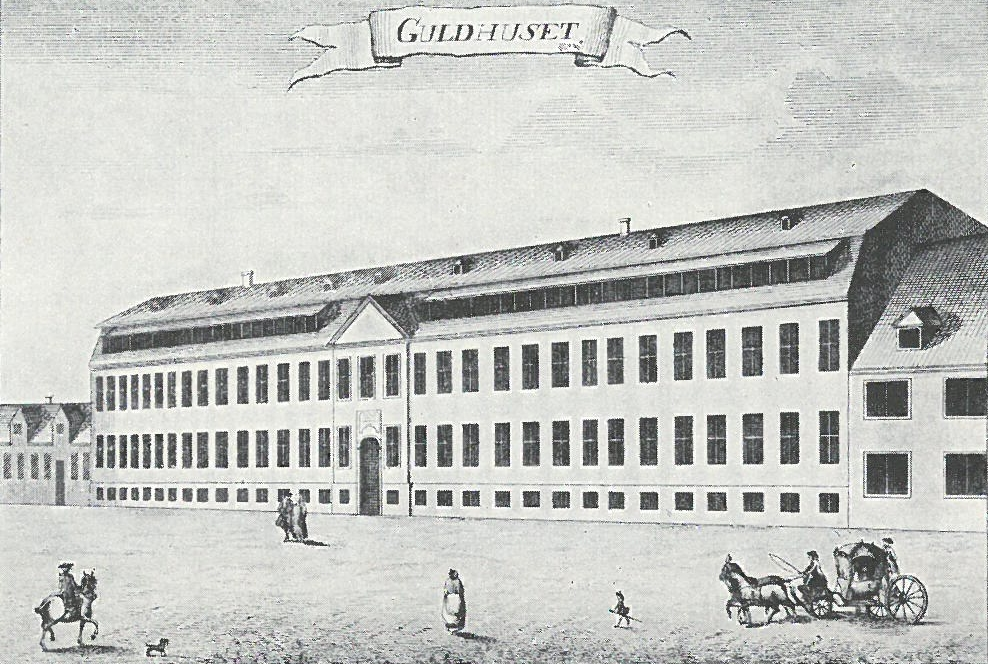
The Gold House

A military hospital was first opened at the site from 1673 when it took over the so-called Gold House, an alchemist laboratory. In 1683, Christian V purchased the buildings and used them as a textile factory. They were destroyed by fire in 1759 and replaced by a new building (Det Kgl. Uldmanufaktur) built by Georg Vollmeister in 1760 and extended in 1777–79 to a similar design. From 1799 to 1800, court architect Andreas Kirkerup was responsible for another extension of the building Known as Monderingsdepotet (No. 11). It was used by the Garrison Hospital from 1809.

The textile production moved to Usserød in 1815 and the architect Peder Friis was put in charge of adapting the rest of the complex for use by the hospital. The Garrison Hospital remained at the site until 1928 when it was replaced by the new Military Hospital at Tagensvej.

== Architecture ==
The simple Neoclassical building is 48 bays long. The 31 bays closest to Sølvgade form the original part of the building from 1760. The remaining 17 bays are from the 1779 extension. The main entrances of the complex are located in two slightly projecting, 3-bay sections with triangular pediments. On the wall between the two sections, between the first and second floors, is a stone plaque which commemorates Frederick VI's conversion of the building into a facility for sick and wounded soldiers.

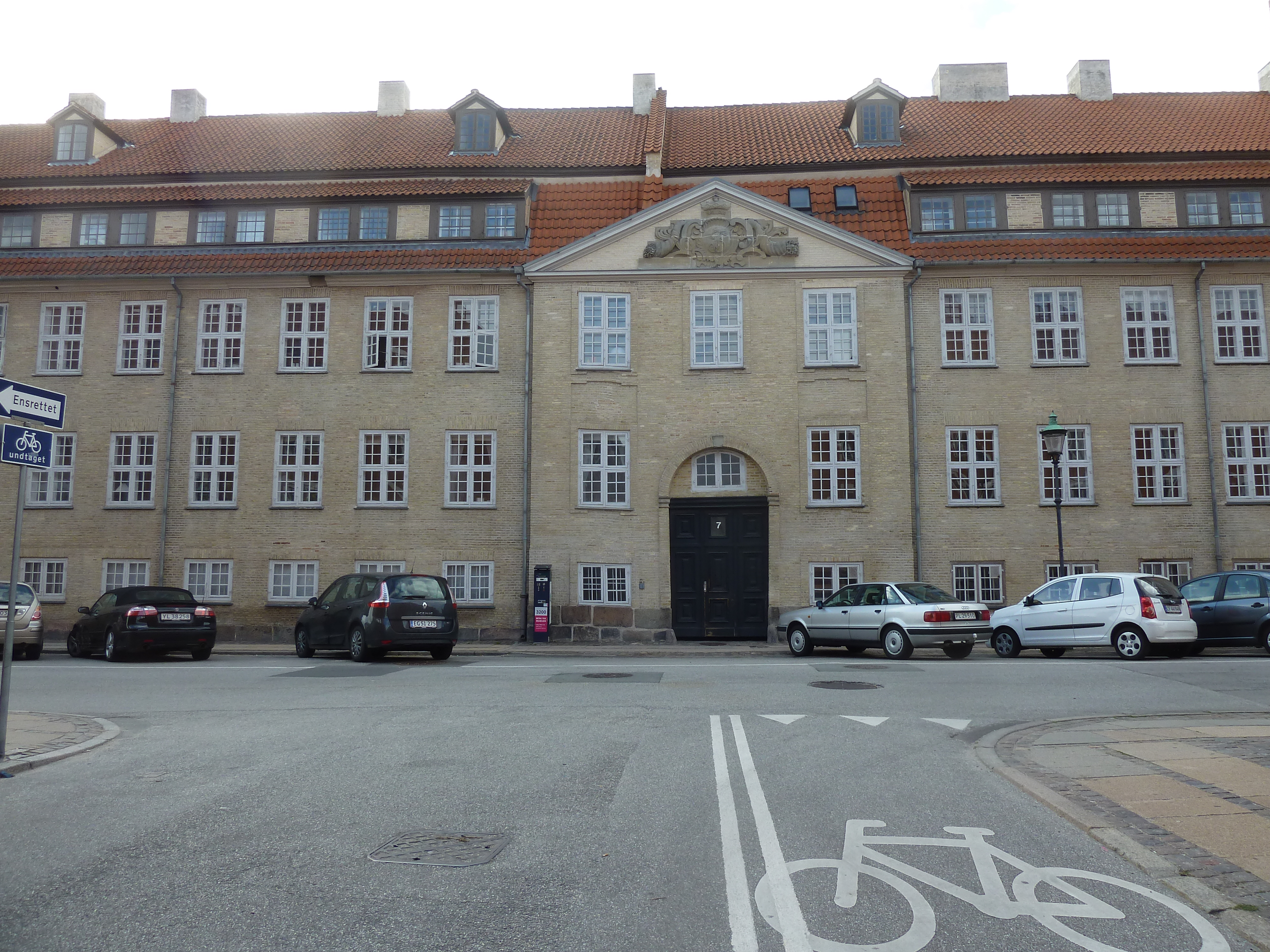
Projecting sections

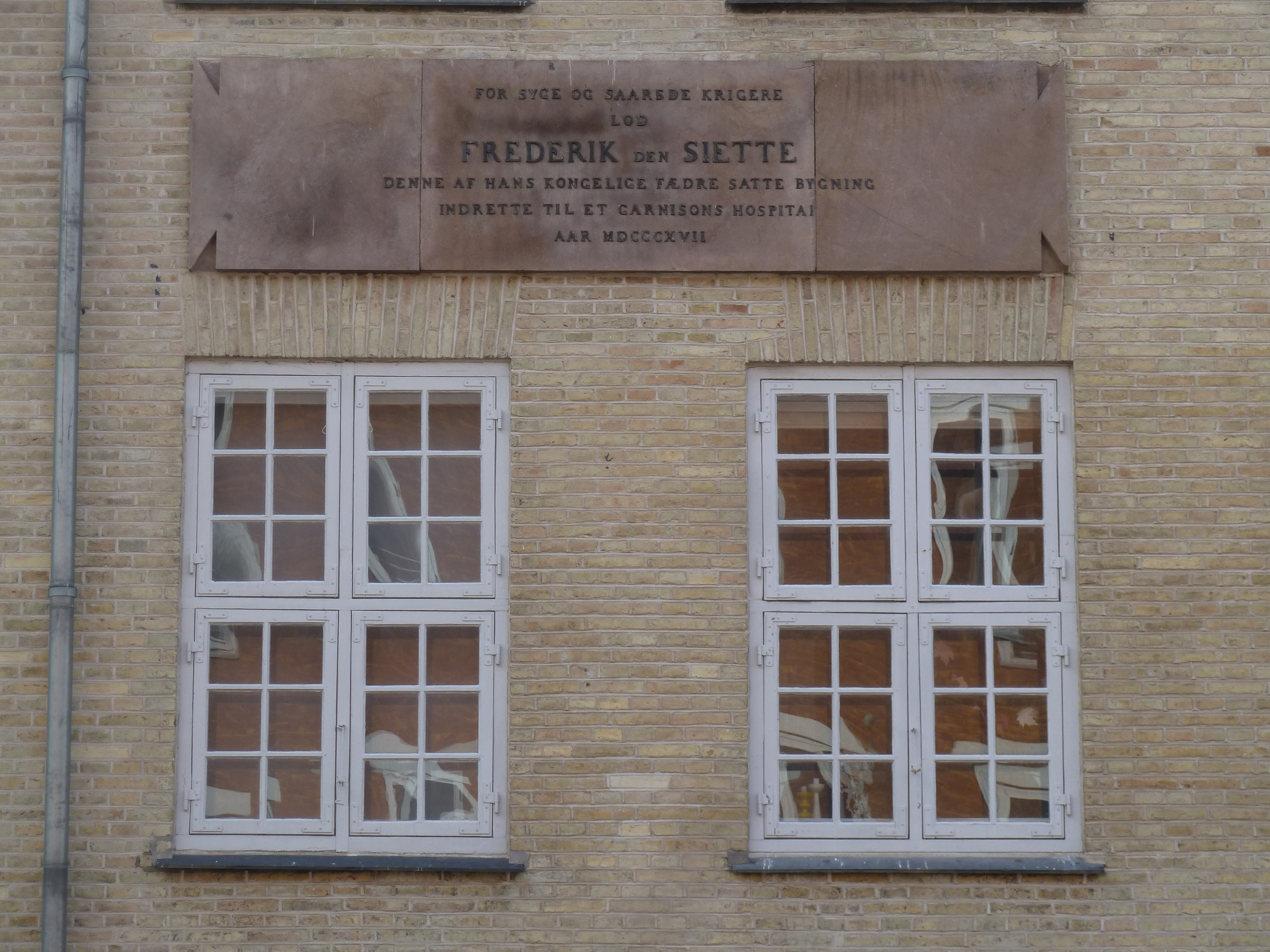
Plaque commemorating Frederick VI's conversion of the building into a hospital for sick and wounded soldiers

== Notable staff ==
- Dr. Ivan Osiier, épée, foil, and sabre fencer, Olympic silver (épée), 25-time Danish champion

== See also ==
- Frederiks Hospital
