= Jens Christian Kofoed =

Danish architect (1864–1941)

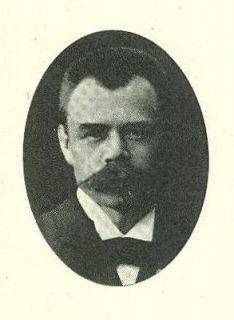
- Jens Christian Kofoed
- Born: 6 April 1864; Ibsker, Denmark
- Died: 3 November 1941 (aged 77); Copenhagen, Denmark
- Education: Royal Danish Academy of Fine Arts
- Occupation: Architect

Jens Christian Kofoed (6 April 1864 – 3 November 1941) was a Danish architect who adopted the Historicist style inspired by Italian architecture from the Middle Ages. He is remembered above all for his churches, seamen's homes and hostels.

== Biography ==
Kofoed, the son of Maurits Markmann Kofoed and Karen Kirstine Hansen who were farmers on the Danish island of Bornholm, first became a carpenter in Nexø before attending the School of Architecture at the Danish Academy from 1888 to 1896. Many of his buildings are built of red brick with tiled roofs and have either rectangular or rounded windows. His hostel on Dragør was inspired by central Italian architecture from the Middle Ages.

His work was part of the architecture event in the art competition at the 1924 Summer Olympics. He travelled widely in western Europe until 1906 and exhibited his work both in Denmark and Germany.

== Works ==
- Missionshus, Bymandsgade 2, Dragør (1897)
- KFUM-borgen (YMCA hostel), Gothersgade/Tornebuskegade, Copenhagen (1898-1901)
- Villa Skodsborg, Skodsborg Strandvej 85, Skodsborg
- YMCA, Klostergade 37, Århus (1903)
- Sømandshjemmet (Seamen's home), Gl. havn, Esbjerg (1903)
- Centralbygning, Forchhammersvej 4-6, Frederiksberg (1903–05)
- Sømandshjemmet Bethel, Nyhavn 22-24 (1909)
- Sømandshjemmet, Skagen Havn (1909)
- Mortuary, Allinge Church (1907)
- Vesterhede Church (1909–10)
- Rectory, Hejnsvig (1910)
- Timotheus Kirke (St Timothy's Church), Christen Bergs Allé 5, Copenhagen (1911)
- Restoration of Jerusalem's Church, Rigensgade, Copenhagen (1914)
- Housing, for example in the Stockholmsgade area, around Skt. Jakobs Gade and Østerbrogade and on Enghave Plads

== Gallery ==
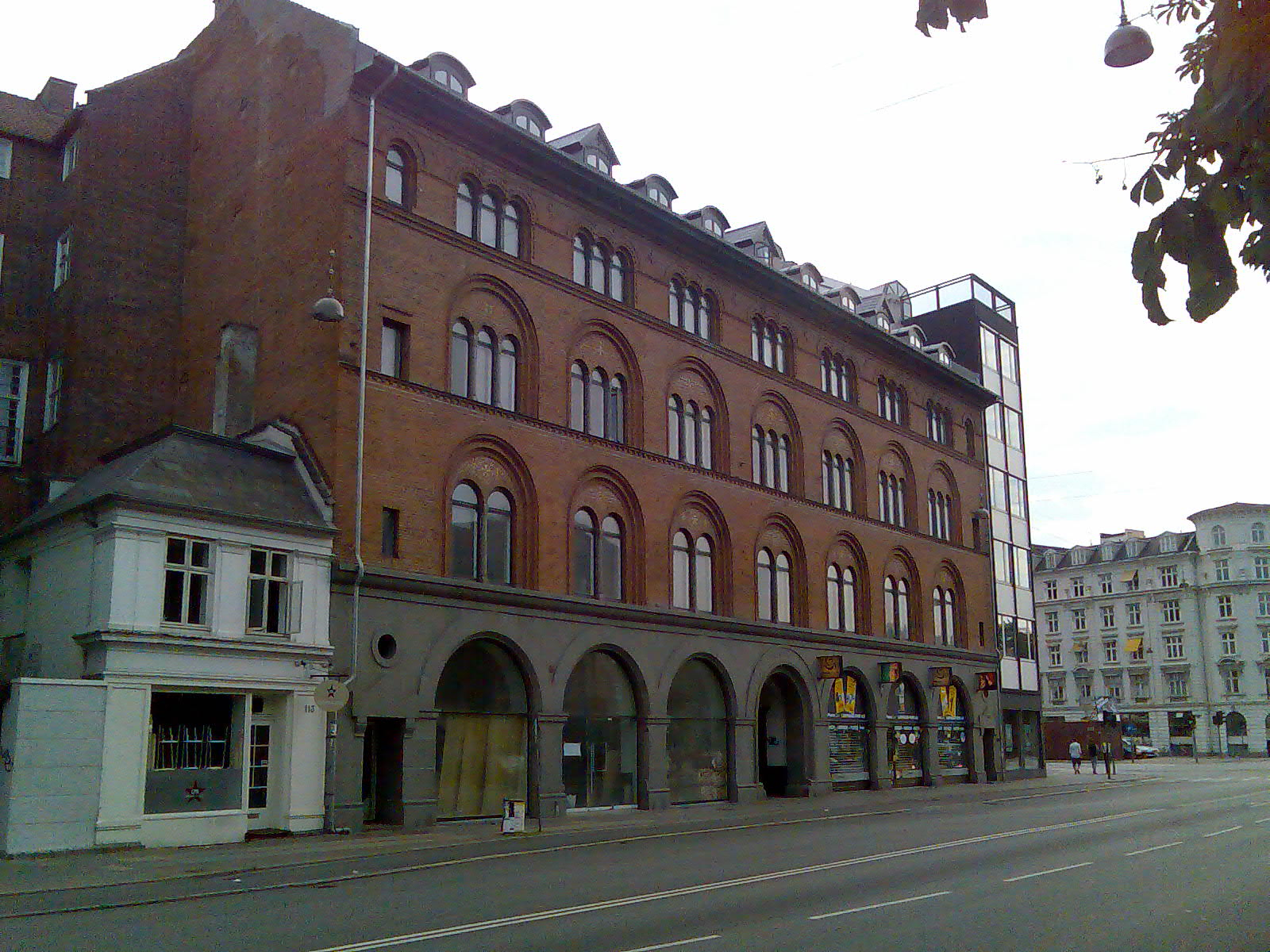
YMCA building, Gothersgade, Copenhagen (1901)

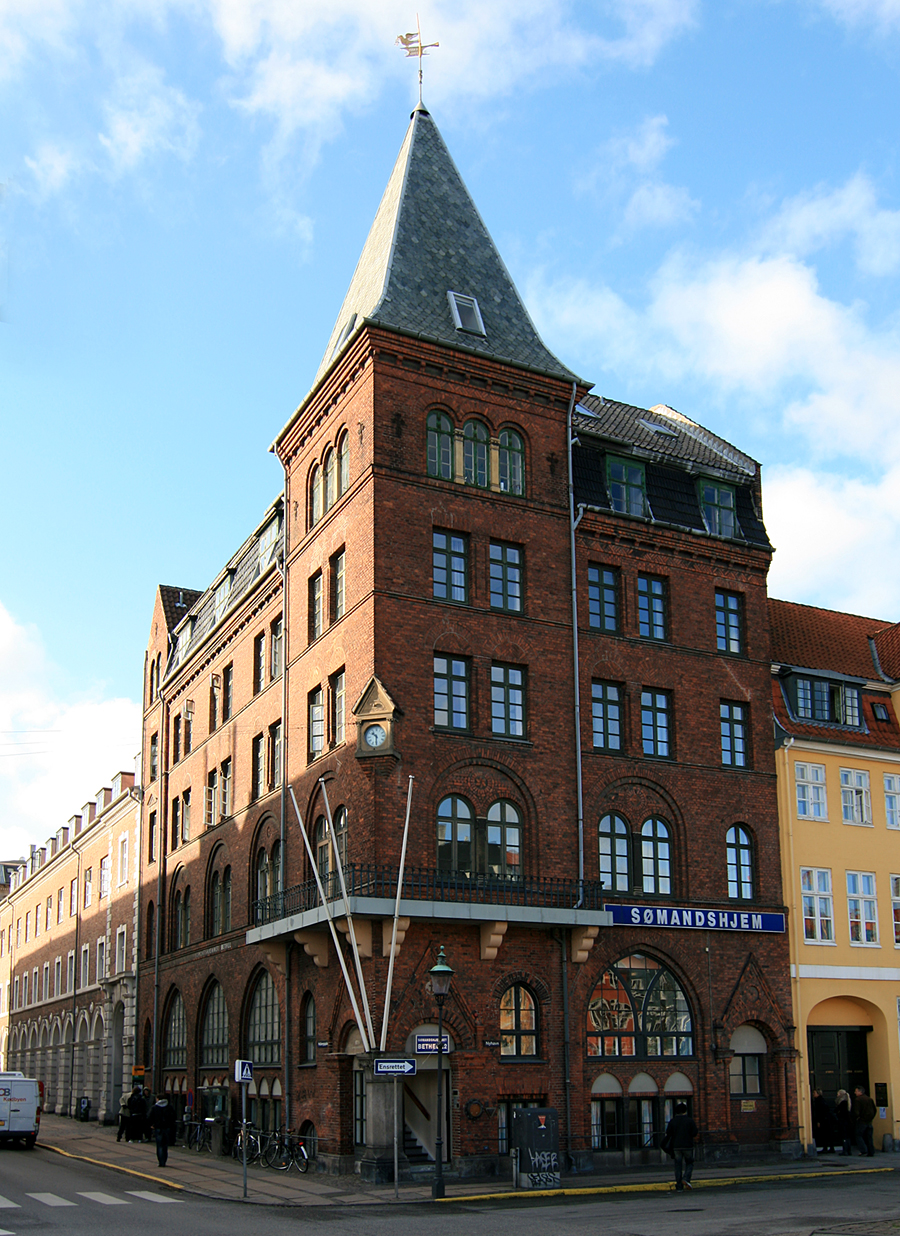
Seamen's Home, Nyhavn, Copenhagen (1909)

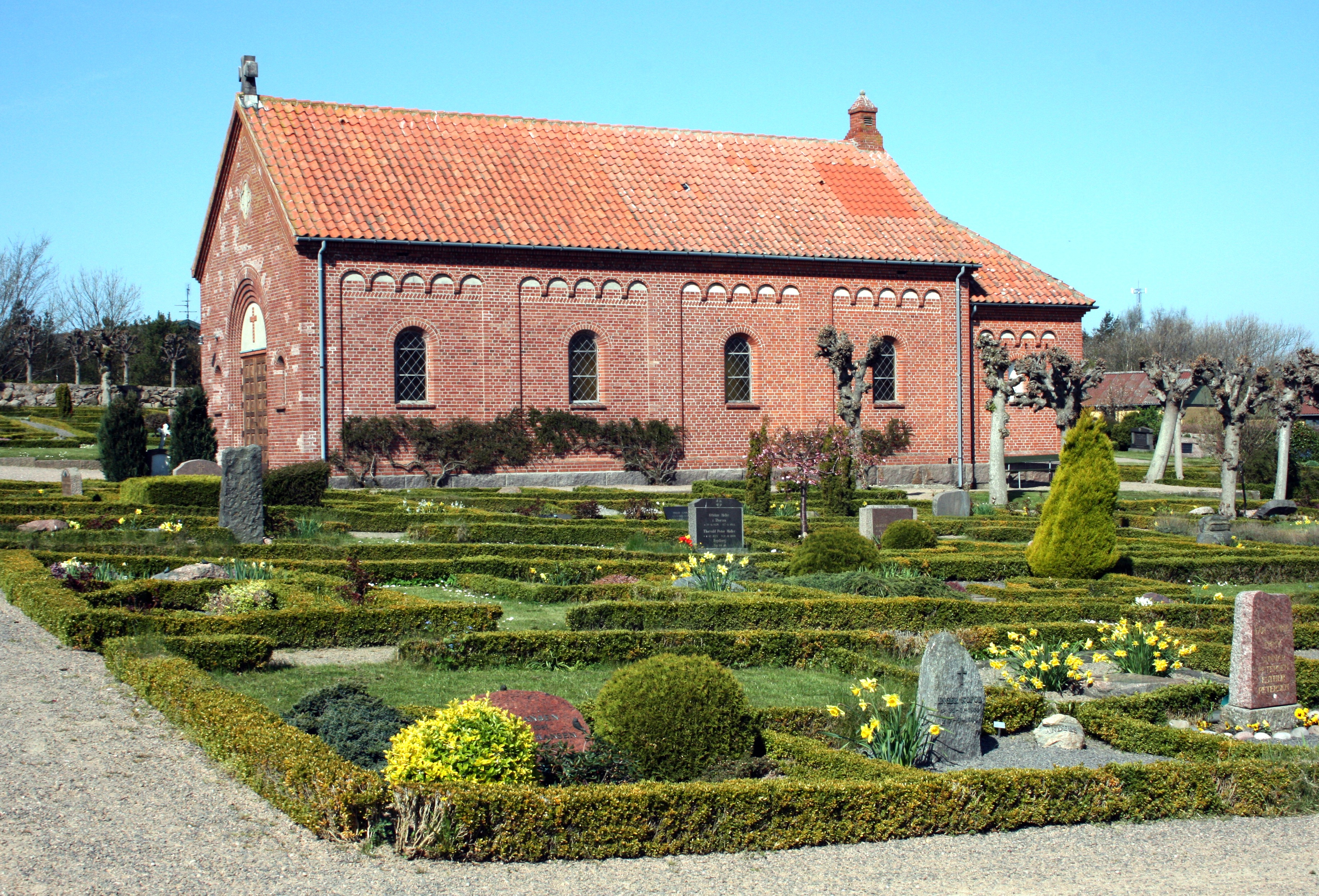
Chapel in Allinge, Bornholm (1907)

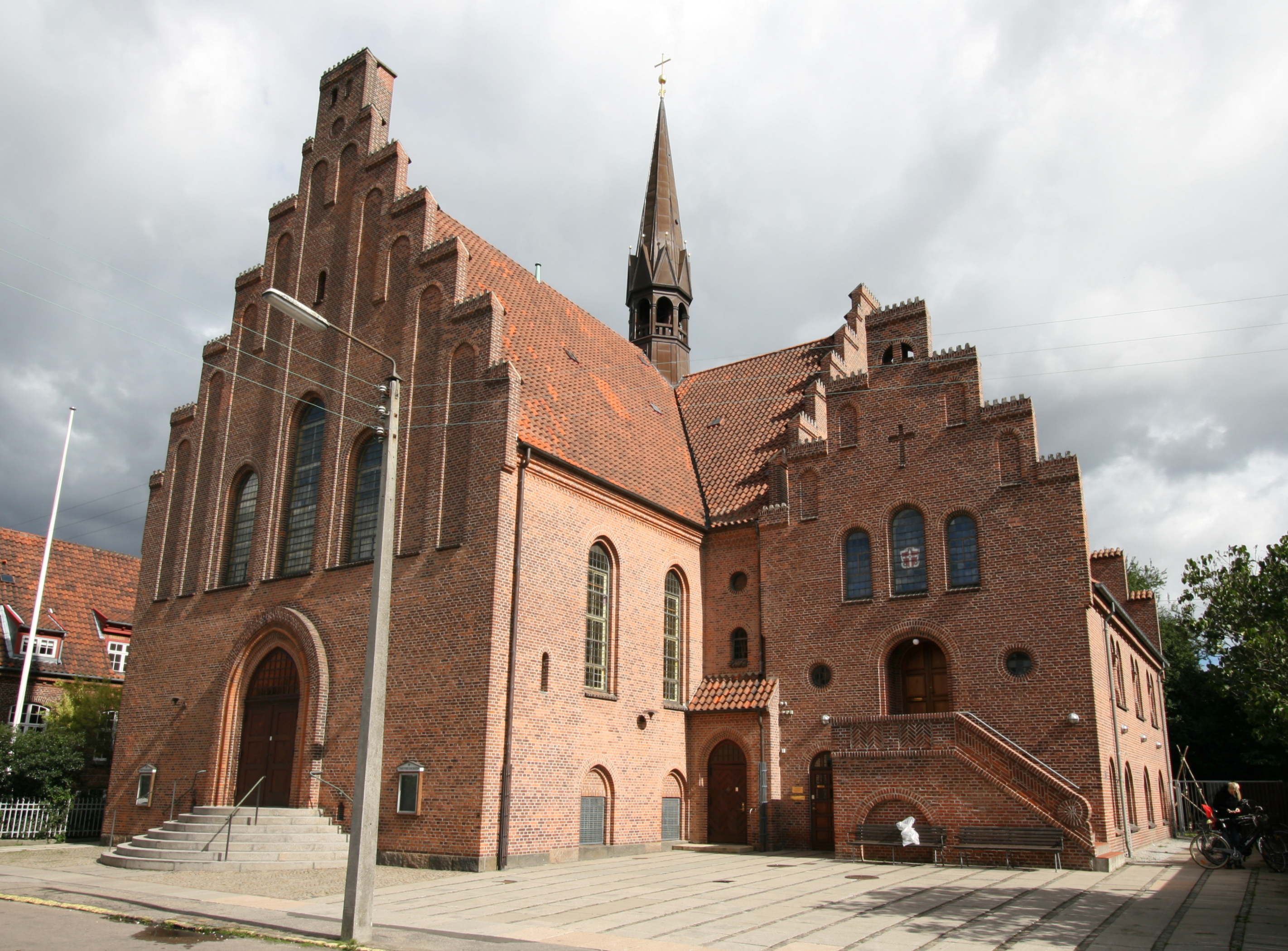
Timothy's Church, Copenhagen (1911)
