= Hotel Bethel =

Sailor's in Copenhagen, Denmark

Coordinates: 55.6794°N 12.5909°E

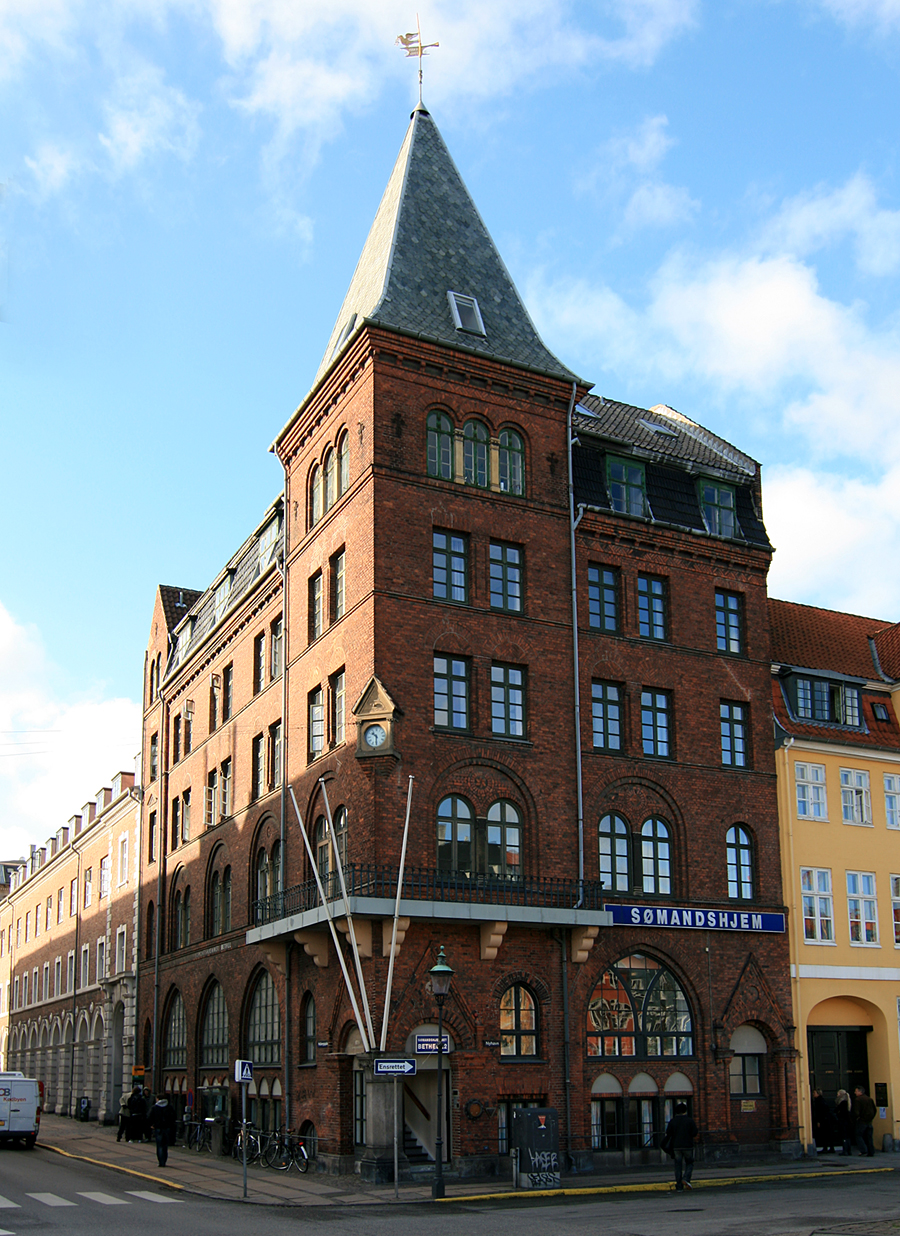
Hotel Bethel

Sømandshjemmet Bethel, now known as Hotel Bethel, is a sailor's hostel overlooking the Nyhavn canal in central Copenhagen, Denmark. Today it is mainly used as a residential hotel. The site also comprises a sailor's church.

== History ==
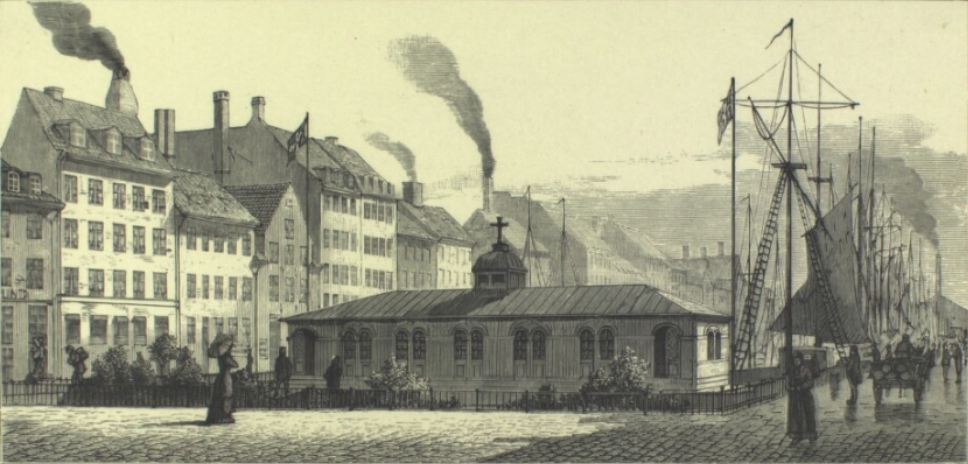
The Bethel ship on a drawing by Vilhelm Dahlerup

From the 1870s, Pastor Daniel C. Prior, pastor aty at Church of Holmen, together with his wife, engaged in missionary work among sailors in Copenhagen. In 1876, they made contact with Ninna and Andreas Wollesen, a married couple who, for several years, had been involved in missionary work among sailors in New York City before being sent to Copenhagen by an organization to continue their activity there. In 1879, Wollesen and Prior opened a seamen's room in Holbergsgade. Two years later, it was replaced by an old ship, Bethel, which was berthed at the end of the Nyhavn canal. It contained a church room seating 300, kitchen facilities and a reading room.

In 1904, Sømandsmissionen's board acquired the property at Nyhavn on the corner of Holbergsgade and Nyhavn and engaged the architect Jens Christian Kofoed to design a new building which was completed in 1905.

The idea of operating reading rooms and hostels for seamen had then spread to other Danish ports and the organization Indenlandsk Sømandsmission was founded on 28 March 1905. At its peak, the organization operated 75 sites in Danish ports. Now four, in Copenhagen, Aarhus, Aalborg and Frederikshavn, are left.

The name Bethel originally referred to a ship that was located in the Nyhavn canal from the 1880s until it sank in 1906. It was for many years used as a hostel for seamen.

Bethel was built in 1906 to a design by

== Nyhavn 22 ==
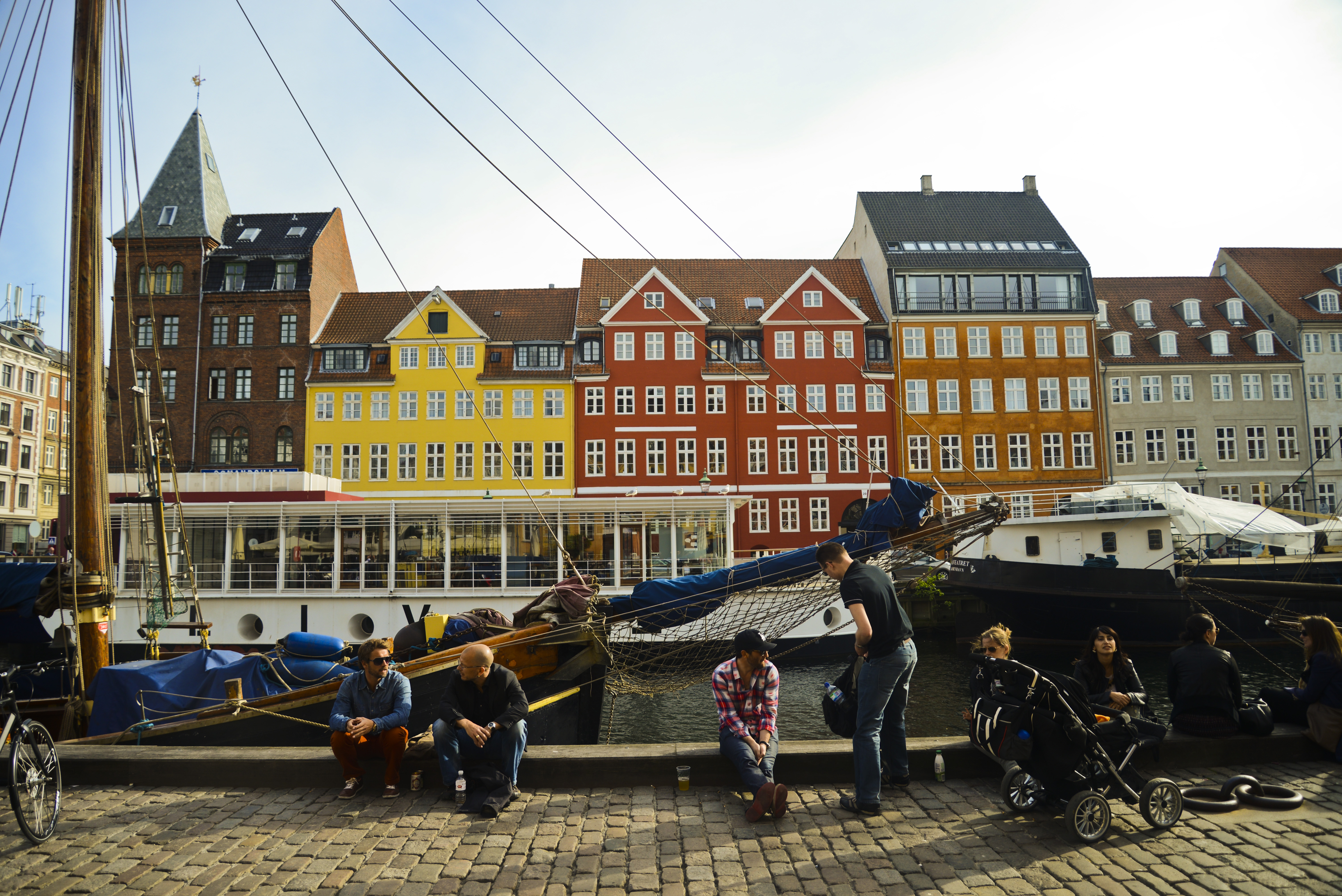
Hotel Bethel viewed from the other side of the canal

In 1949, Bethel took over the neighbouring building at Nyhavn 22, a former merchant's house completed in 1779 for af Samuel Blichfeldt (1749-1787). Hans Christian Andersen lived in the building from 1871 to 1875. The yellow building is three storeys high and nine bays wide. It was listed in 1932 and restored by the architects Peter Koch (1905-1980) og Esben Klint (1915-1969) in 1951–52.

== Church ==
A seamen's church was inaugurated at the site on 23 March 1952. The bell, sited on the roof of the building, was a donation from Mærsk Mc-Kinney Møller. The church is located in a 200 years old storage building in the yard, previously used for overseas trading. Service is held twice a month from October through April.
