= Allinge Church =

Church in Allinge-Sandvig, Bornholm, Denmark

Coordinates: 55°16′33″N 14°48′11″E

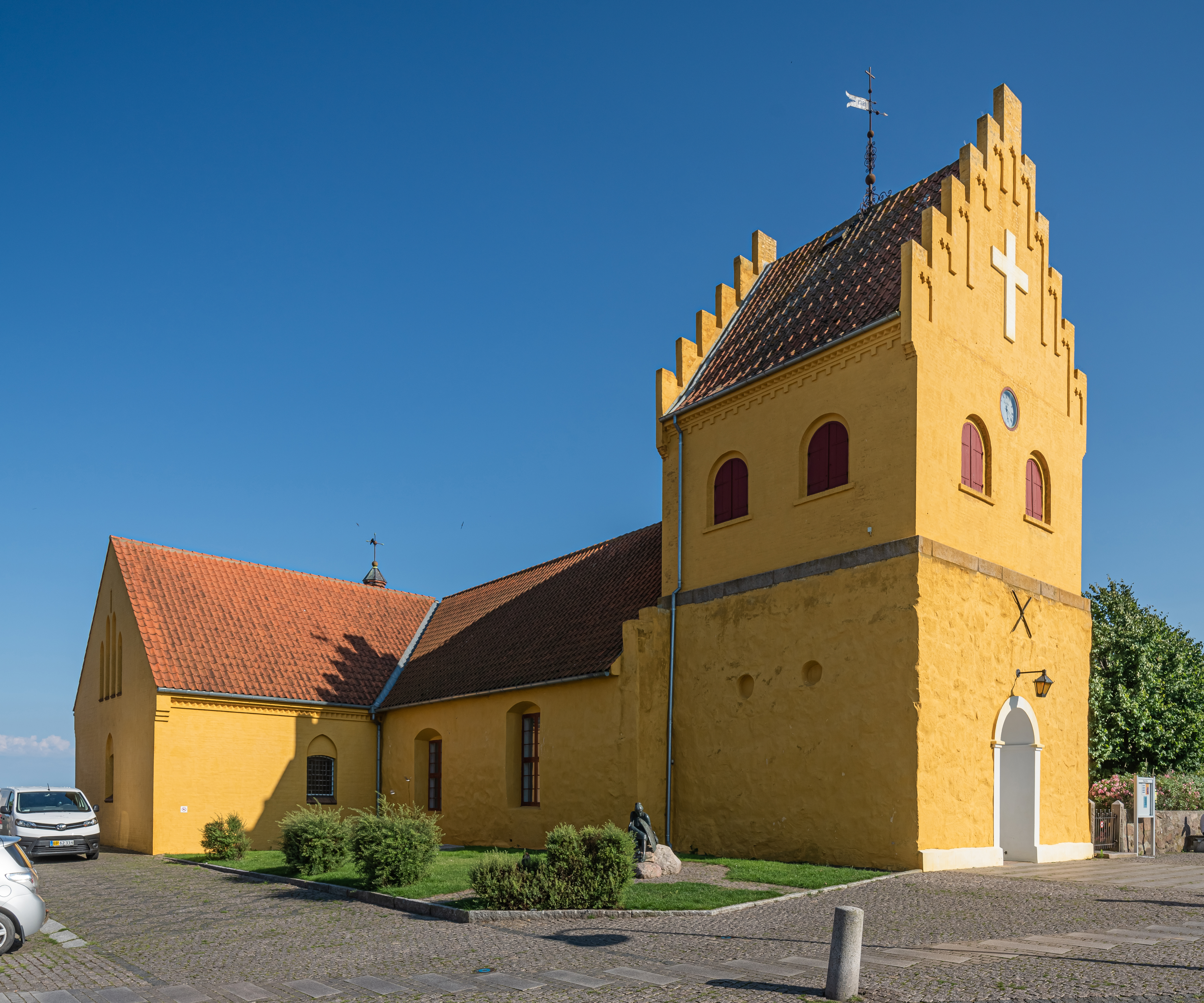
Allinge Church, exterior view

Allinge Church (Danish: Allinge Kirke) is the parish church of Allinge-Sandvig on the Danish island of Bornholm. It stands at the centre of Allinge on a hill some 11 metres above sealevel. Initially just a small granite longhouse from the around the 14th century, in 1892 it was completely rebuilt in the Neogothic style.

== History ==
The earliest documented record of the church dates from 1569 when it was known as "Alende Capell" (Alende Chapel). With the Reformation it passed from the Archbishopric of Lund to the Danish crown but is now fully independent. Until 1941, it was an annex to Sankt Ols Kirke.

== Architecture ==
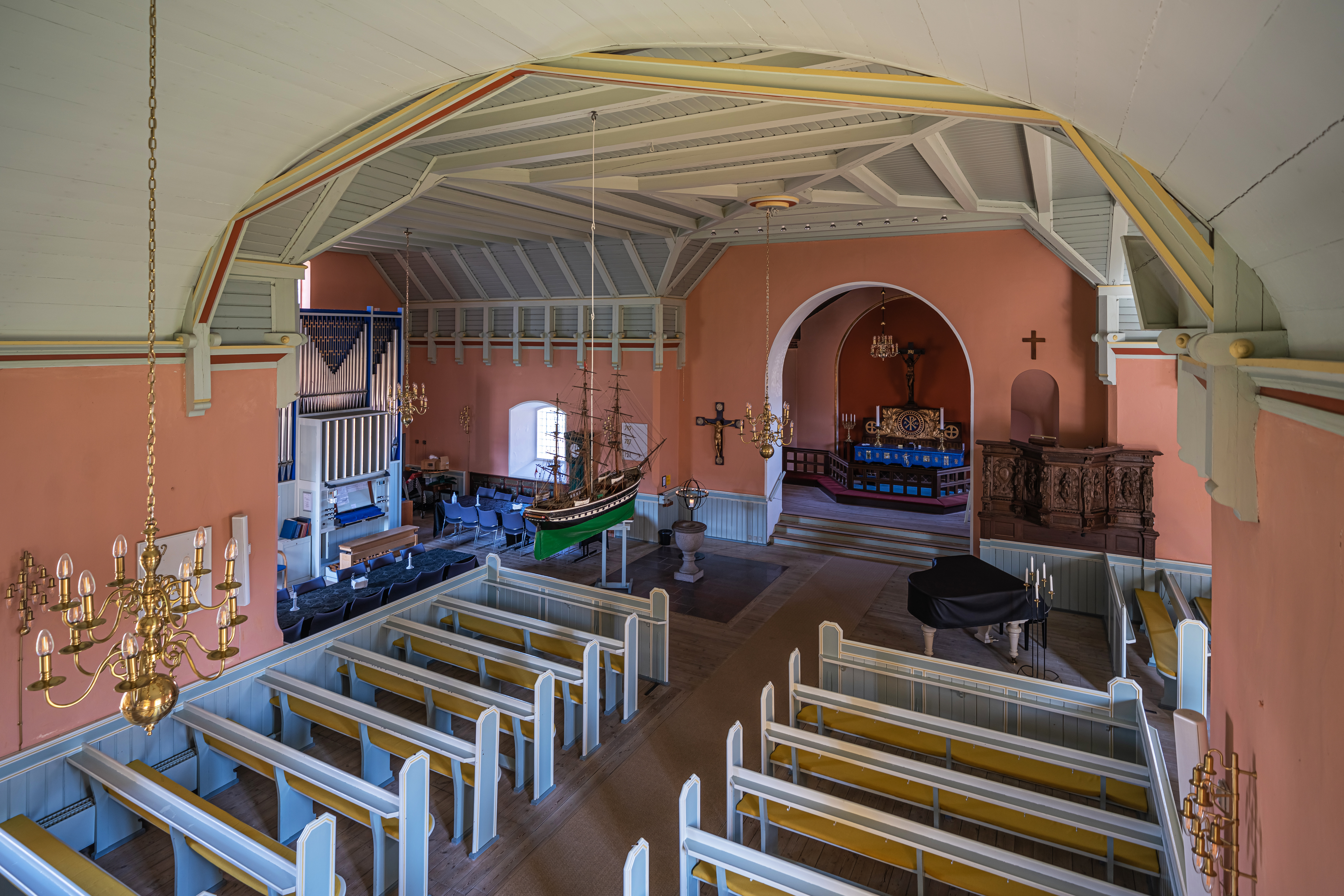
Allinge Church, interior view

The late-Gothic longhouse, the oldest section of the structure, is built of rough granite fieldstone with brick-framed wall openings. The upper rounded arches of the old north and south doors have been almost completely removed by more recent windows while the arched windows which, together with the north door, can be seen in a painting of the church from c. 1750. The tower, which is rather narrower than the longhouse, dates from the 16th century. The west door is from 1865 when the upper part of the tower was rebuilt.

In 1892, the church was comprehensively renovated by Mathias Bidstrup. The entire eastern part was torn down and replaced by two transepts and, at the far eastern end, a chancel. Further interior restoration work, including repainting, was carried out in 1992 by Jørn Appel from Rønne.

The roof is tiled in old oak. The outer walls are limewashed over and painted yellow.

== Artifacts and fittings ==
The altarpiece, of which only the base remains, is from c. 1625. It has now been relocated at the far end of the chancel. The granite font is from 1890. The Renaissance pulpit from 1650 is decorated with ten carved panels, four of which contain statues of the evangelists. The western gallery is new, replacing an earlier structure. The Frobenius organ, now in the north transept, dates from 1962.

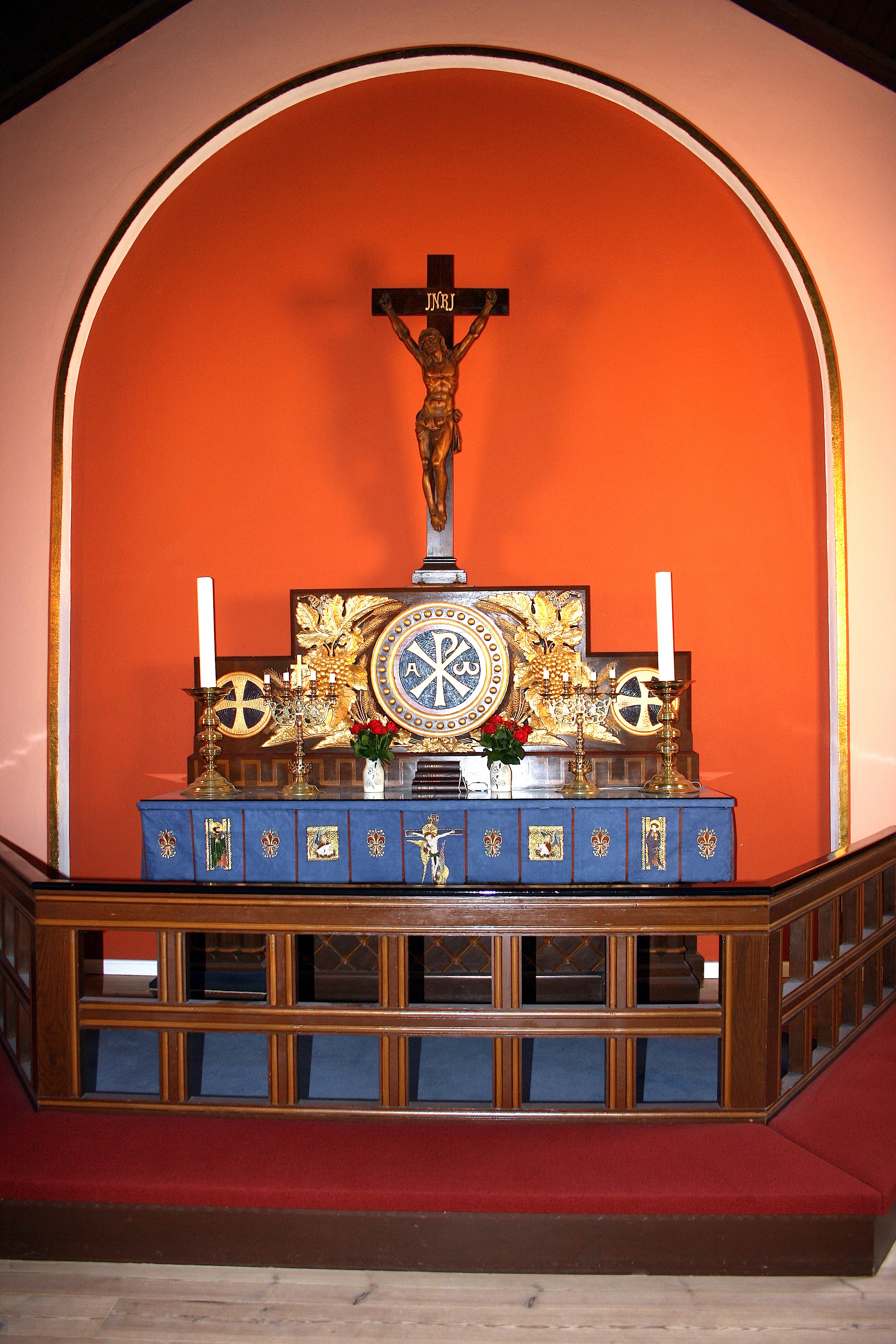
Altar

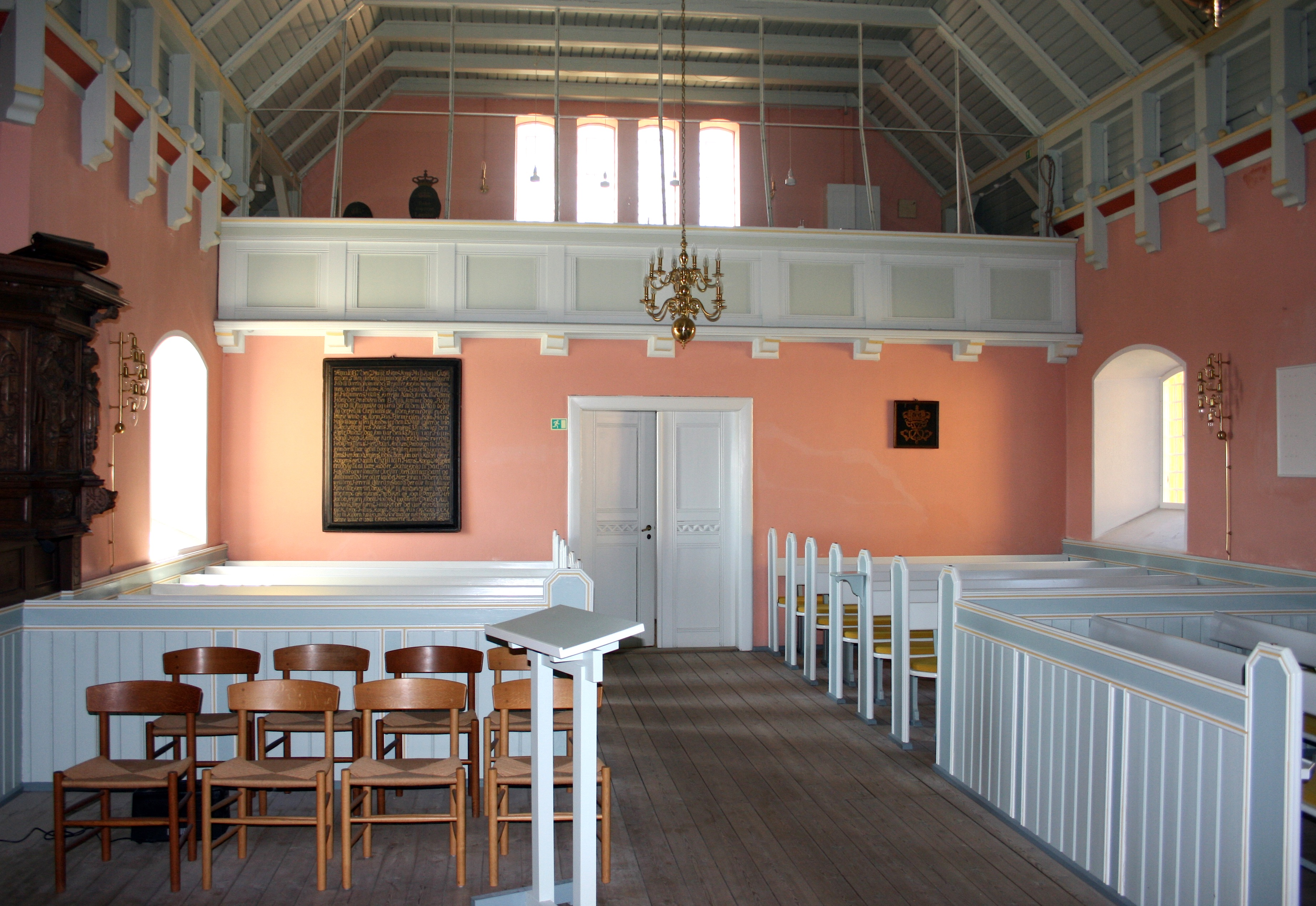
Transept

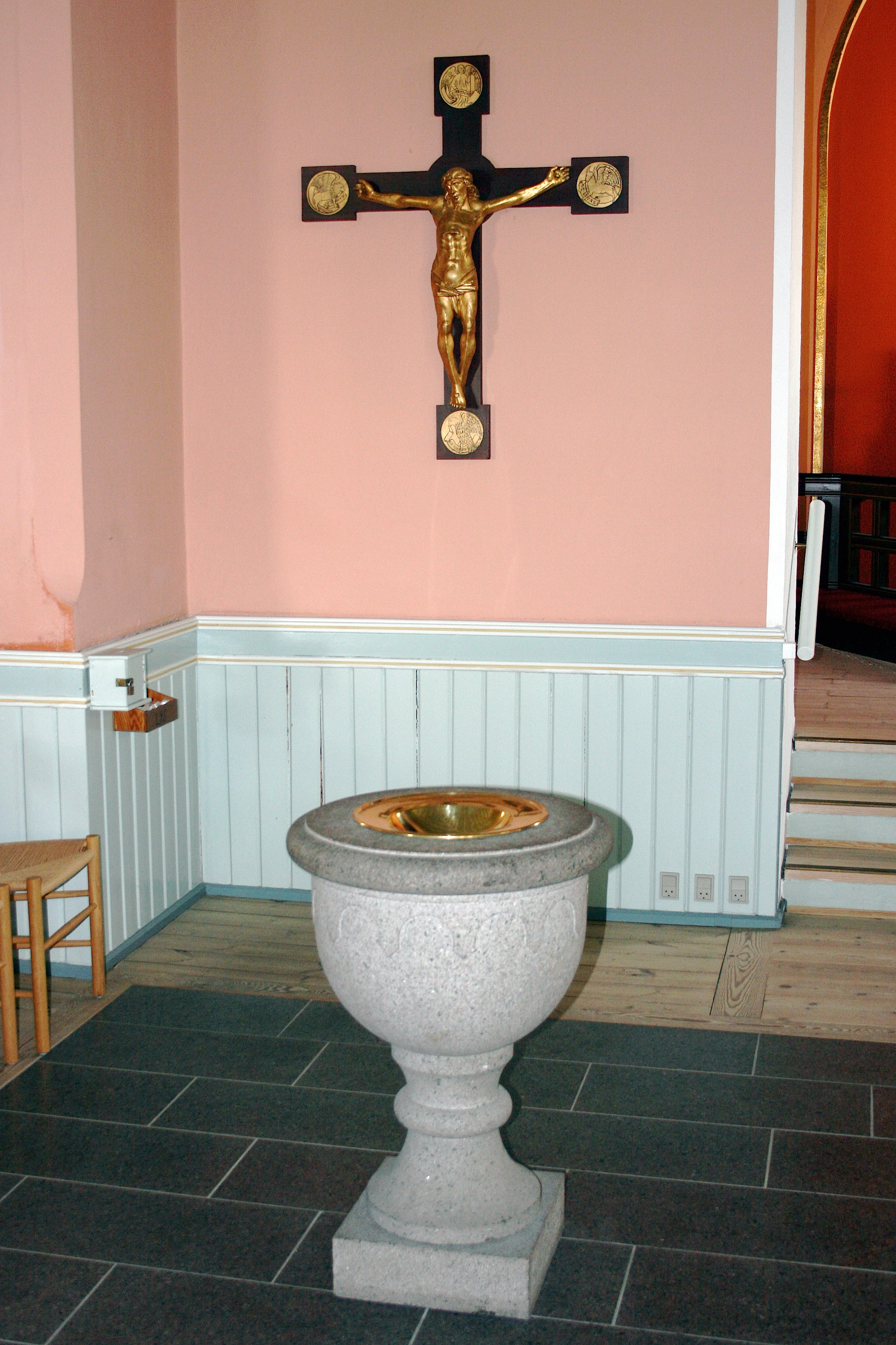
Font

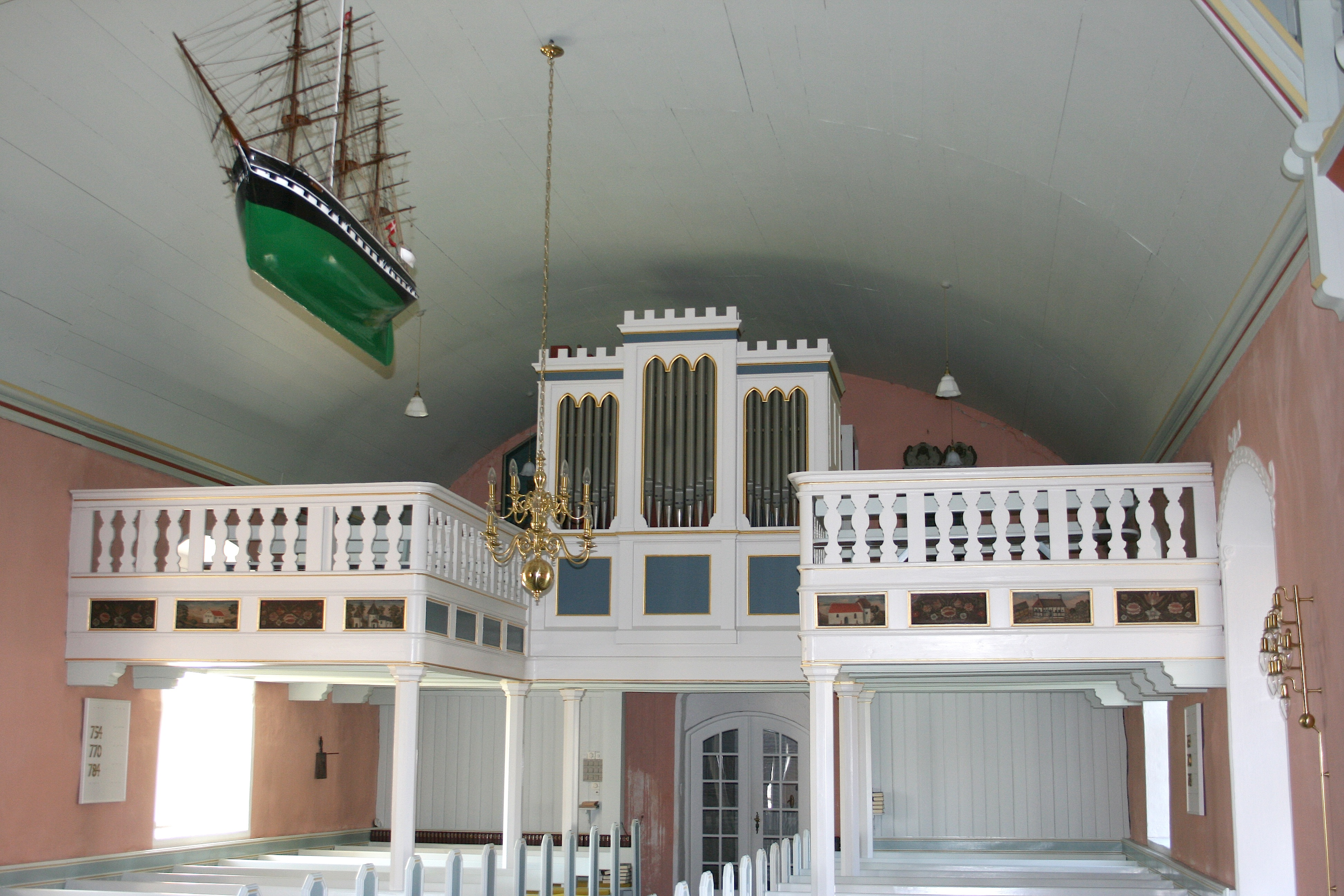
Gallery

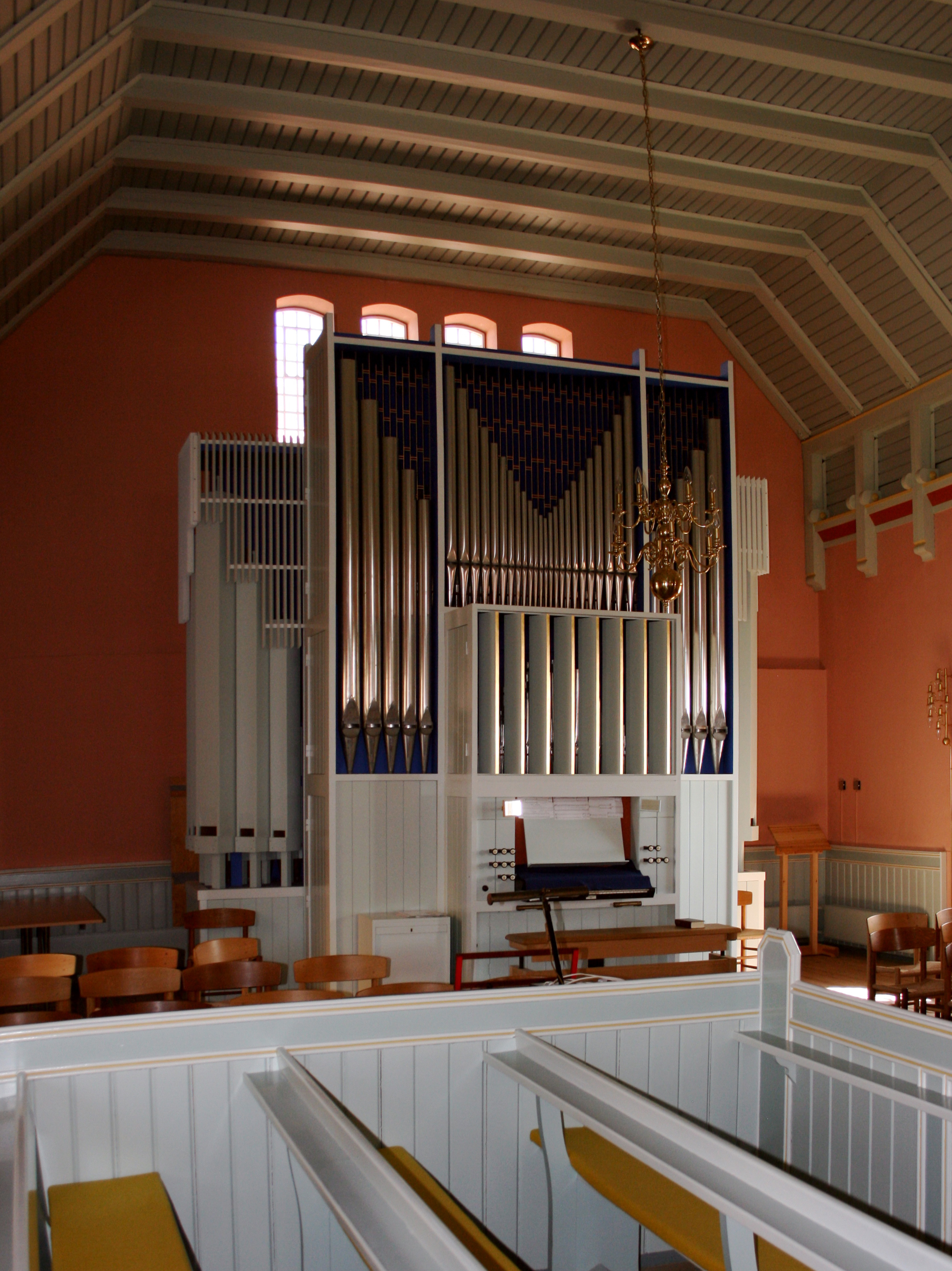
Organ
