= Jerusalem's Church, Copenhagen =

Jerusalem Church
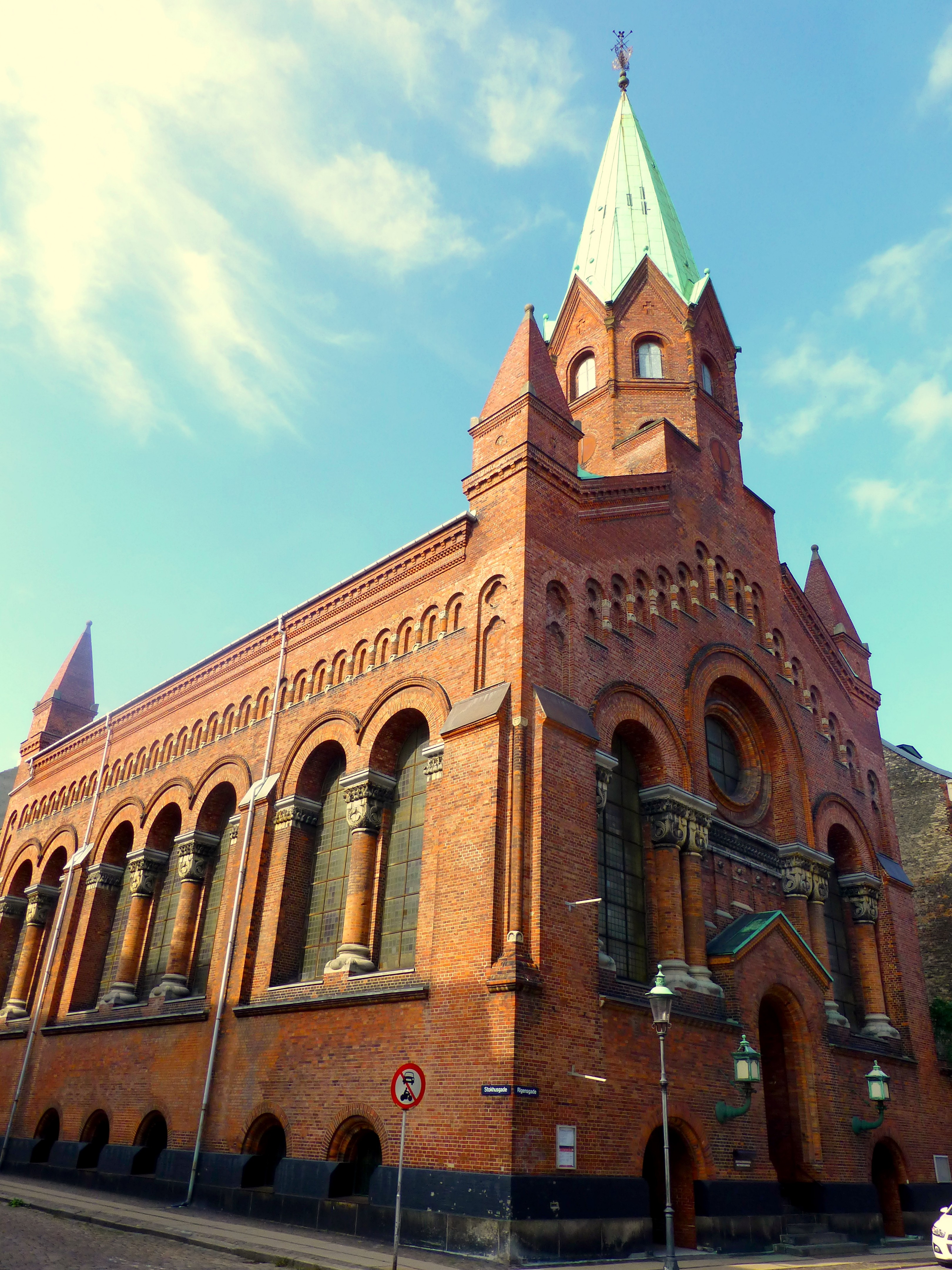
- Church viewed at the corner of Ringensgade and Stokhusgade
- Jerusalem Church
- 55°41′19.87″N 12°35′1.94″E
- Location: Copenhagen
- Country: Denmark
- Denomination: United Methodist Church

History
- Status: Church

Architecture
- Architect: Ferdinand Vilhelm Jensen
- Architectural type: Church
- Groundbreaking: 1864
- Completed: 1866

Specifications
- Materials: Brick

Jerusalem's Church is the main church of the Methodist community in Denmark. The church building is located in Rigensgade, central Copenhagen. The church was founded by missionaries in 1859, while the current building was opened in 1915 (replacing a destroyed building which dated to 1866).

== History ==
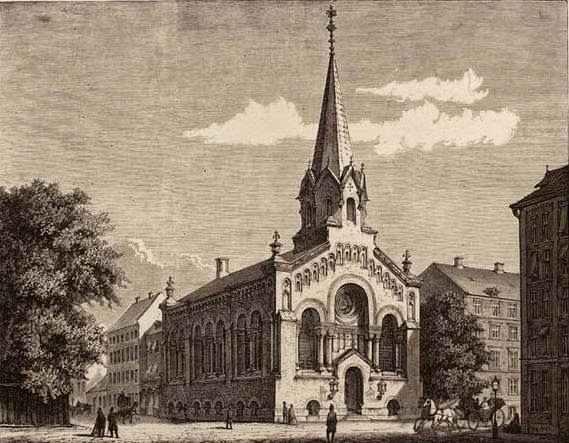
The original design which was somewhat simplified prior to its completion

The first Methodist congregation in Denmark was founded on 11 January 1859 and was based in rented rooms in Store Kongensgade. The congregation grew rapidly and funds were raised for a new church which was completed in 1866 to designs by Ferdinand Vilhelm Jensen. The church was known as St. Paul's Church until 1894 when that name was taken over by the nearby St. Paul's Church. It was then called St. Mark's Church until 1912 when it received its current name.

The current church replaced the original structure, which was destroyed in a fire on 21 January 1914. The current church was built to a slightly modified and somewhat larger design by Jens Christian Kofoed; it was constructed in 1915 and was reinaugurated the following year. The small four-storey building next to the church (MN. 2) is from 1866. It contains the church office.

== Architecture ==
The red-brick church is designed in a mixture of Romanesque Revival and Byzantine Revival styles. It is 27 metres long, 16 metres wide and the tower stands 50.6 metres tall.

== Interior ==
The Jerusalem Church contains an organ built in 1916 and was restored in 1982–84.

== Gospel music ==
The church has three gospel choirs with different profiles: Kefas has existed since 1975, Saints and Sinners has existed since 1994 and Revelation Gospel Choirer is the youngest.

== Image gallery ==
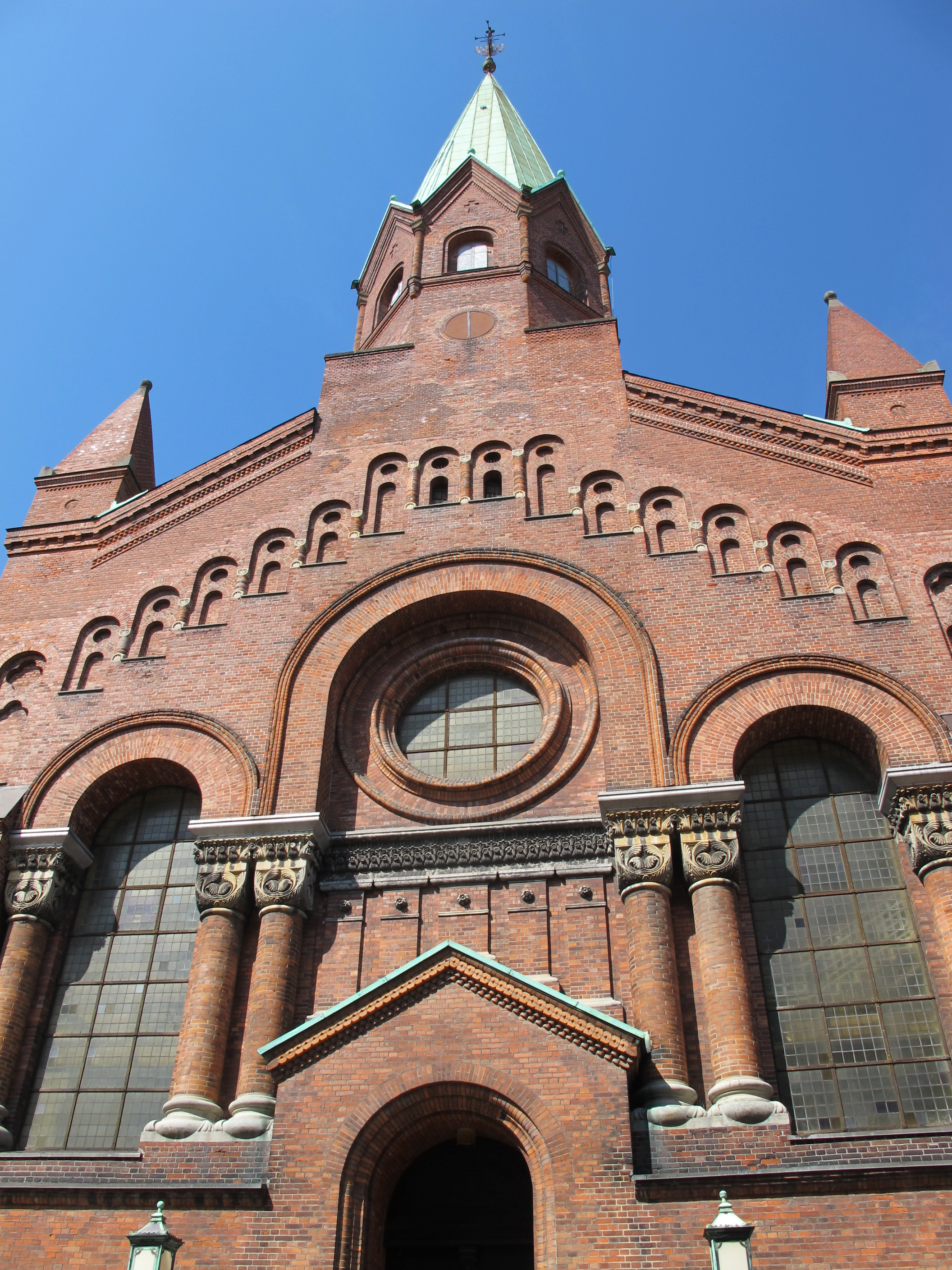
The side with the main entrance on Rigensgade

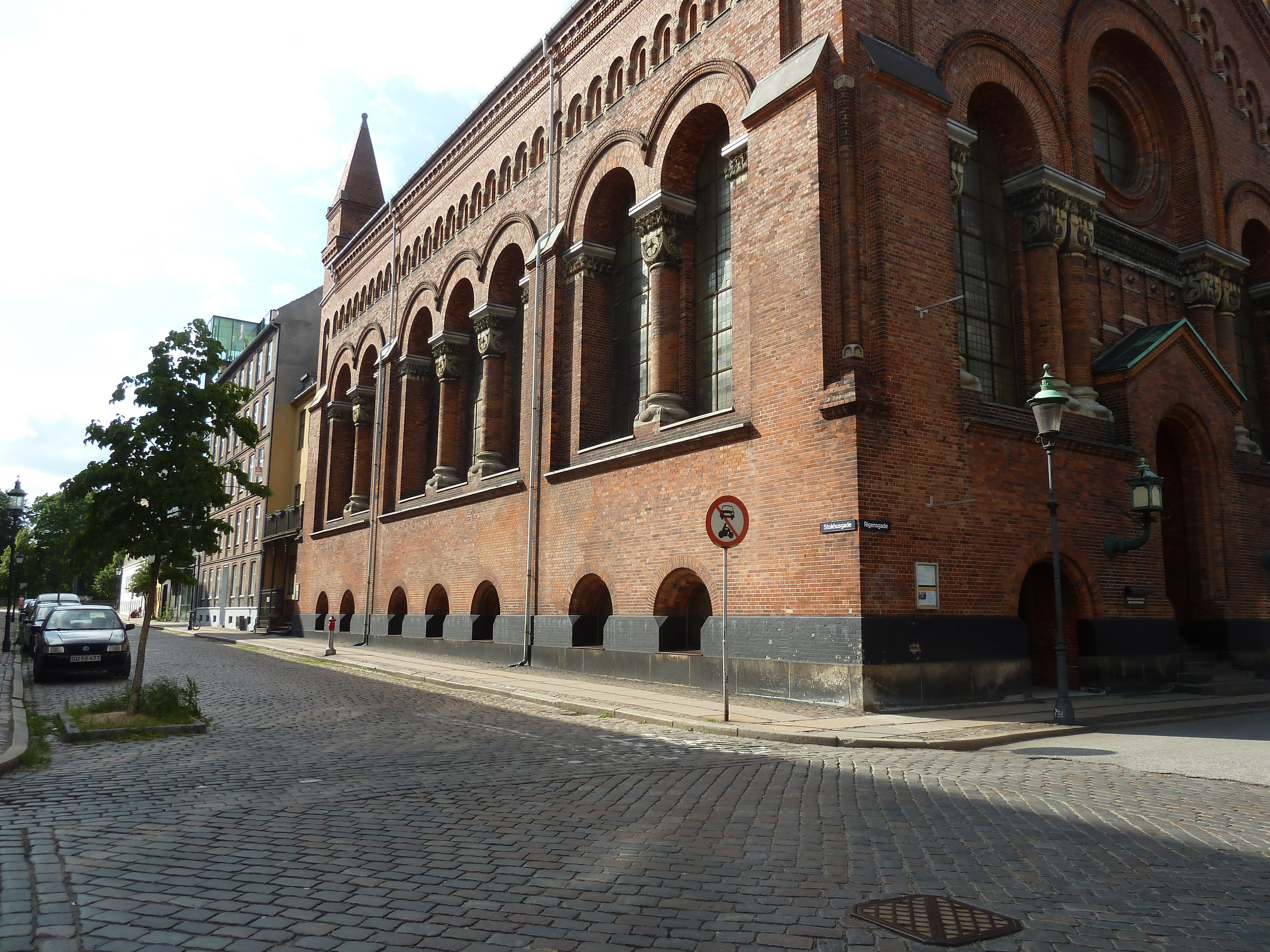
The side on Stokhusgade

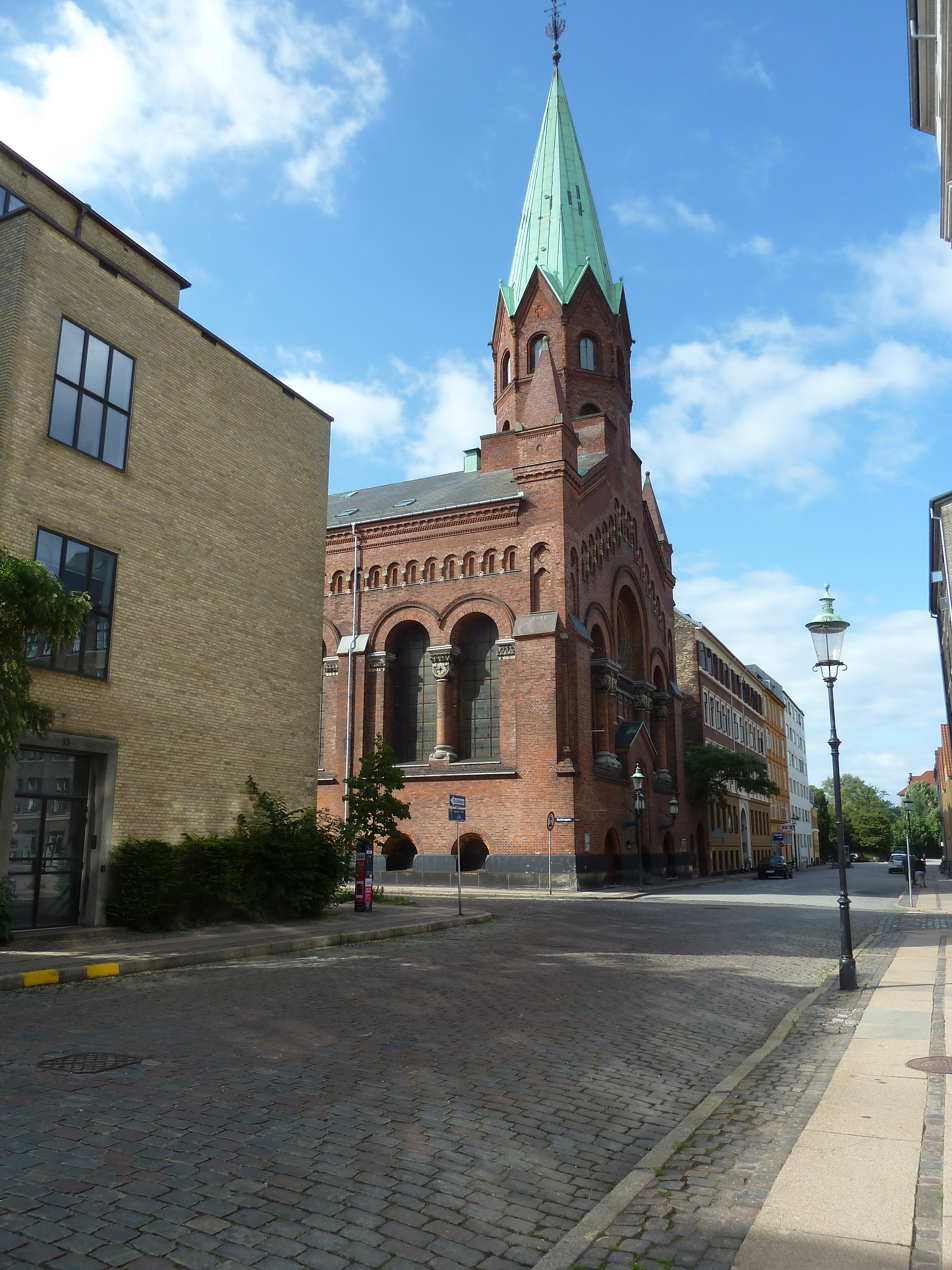
The church seen from Rigensgade

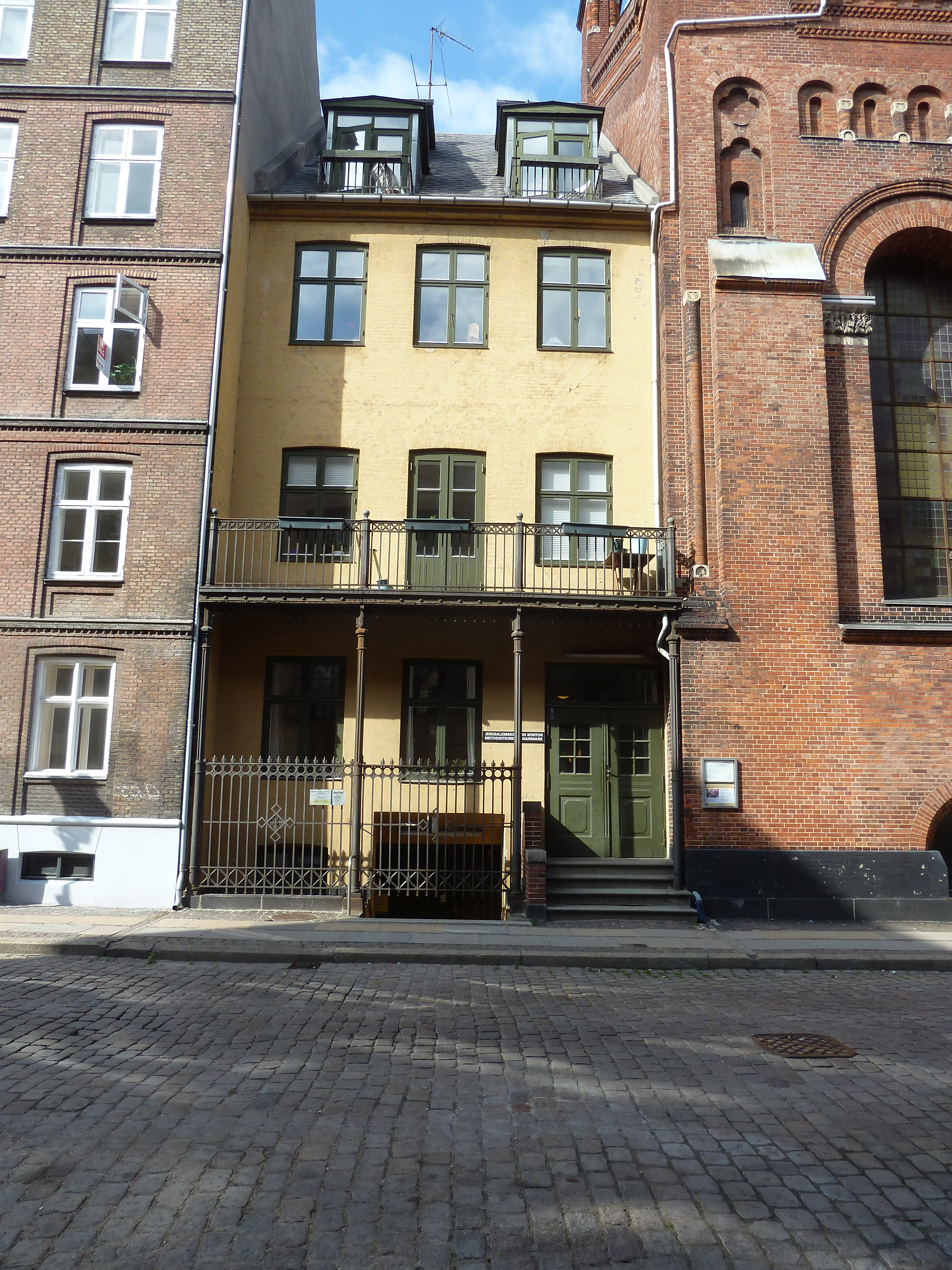
The church office from 1866

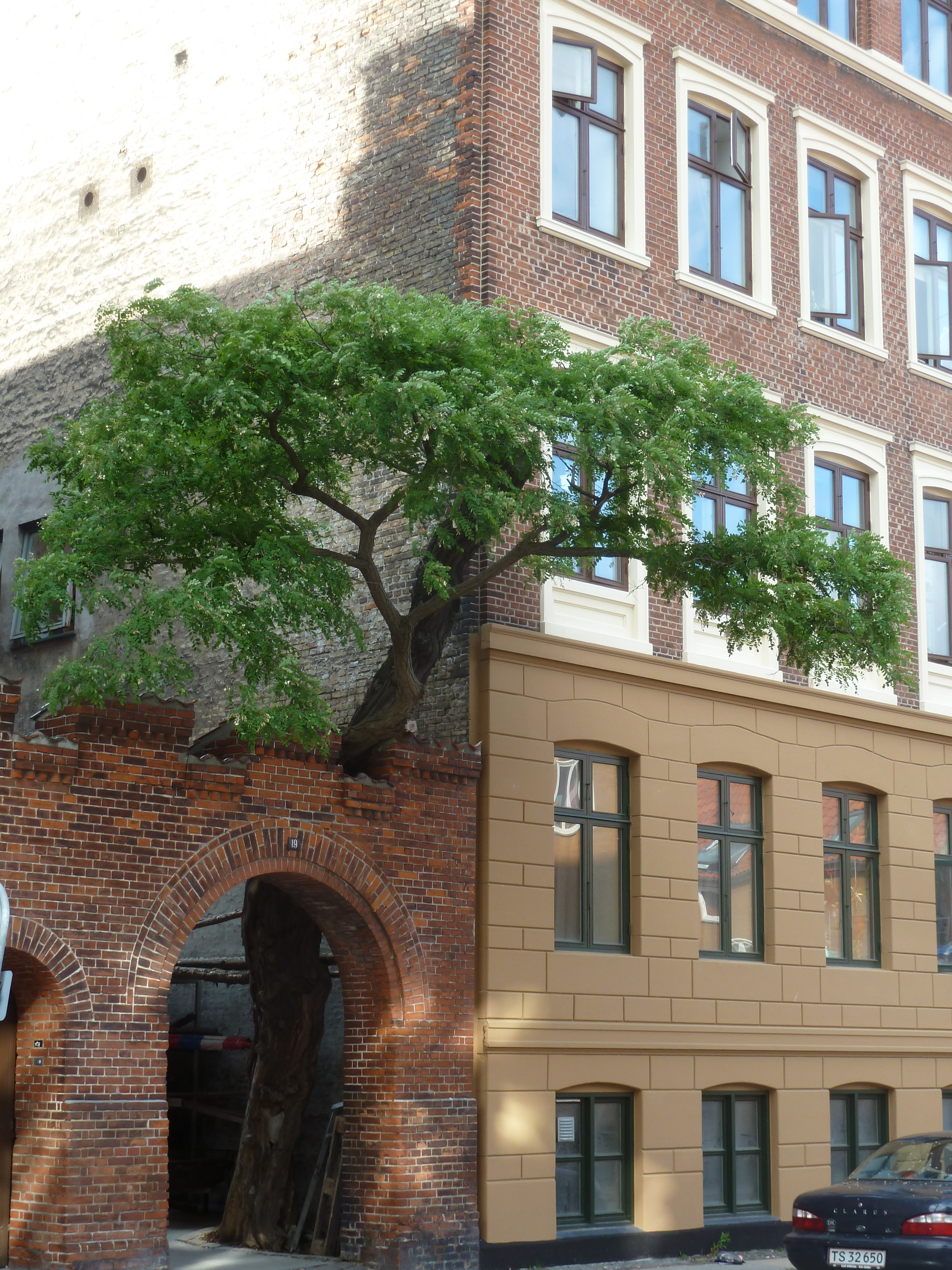
The wall with the gate to the right of the church
