= Copenhagen Stocks House =

Copenhagen Stocks House Københavns Stokhus
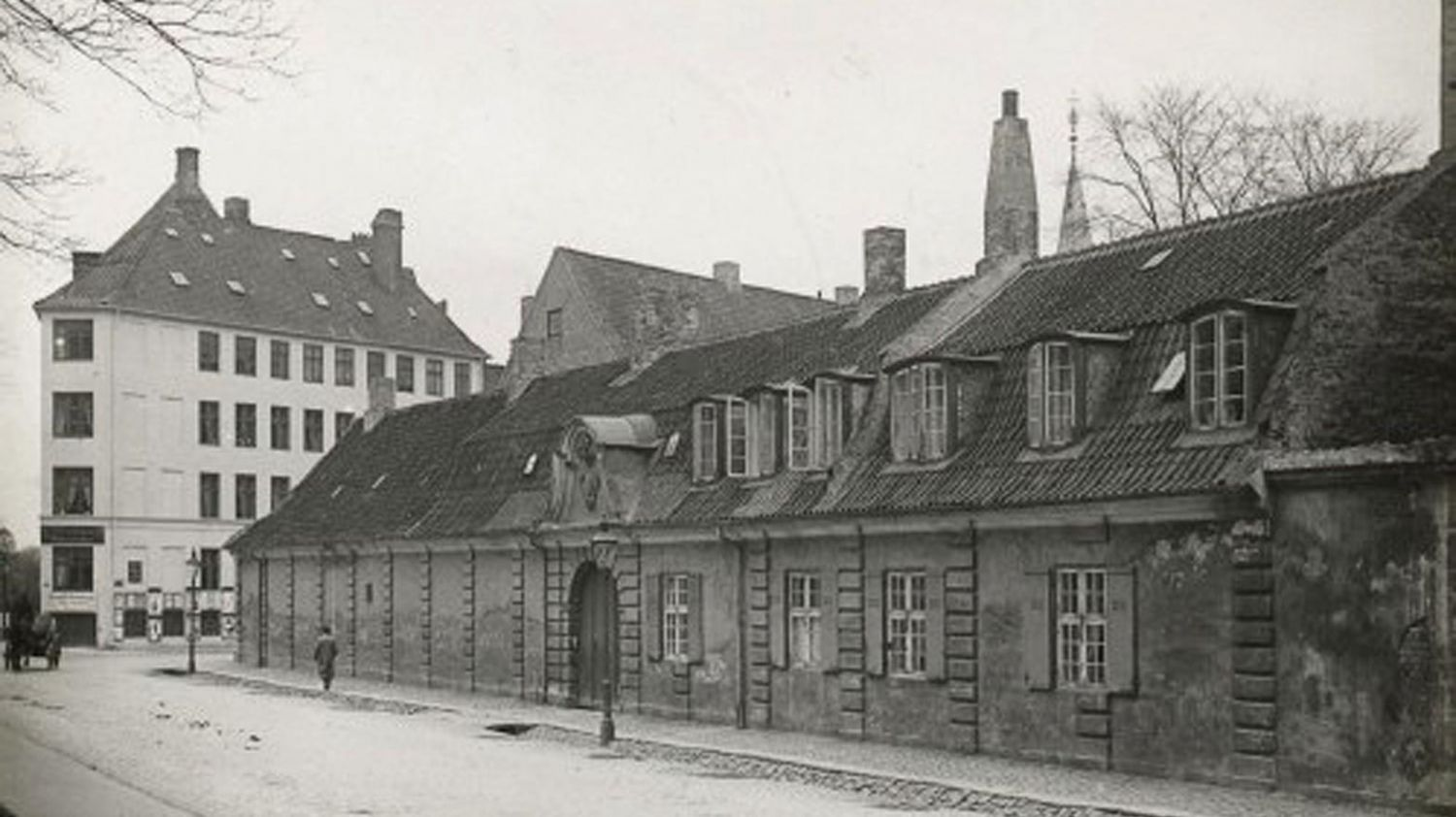
- Øster Voldgade with the Stocks House
- Interactive map of the Copenhagen Stocks House; Københavns Stokhus area

General information
- Location: Copenhagen, Denmark
- Completed: 1677
- Demolished: 1929
- Client: Christian V

The Copenhagen Stocks House (Danish: Københavns Stokhus) was a prison in Copenhagen, Denmark, named for the stocks which used to be located at its premises. Originally a military prison, it was opened to civilian prisoners in 1741. The building was located on Øster Voldgade, opposite the present day National Gallery.

== History ==
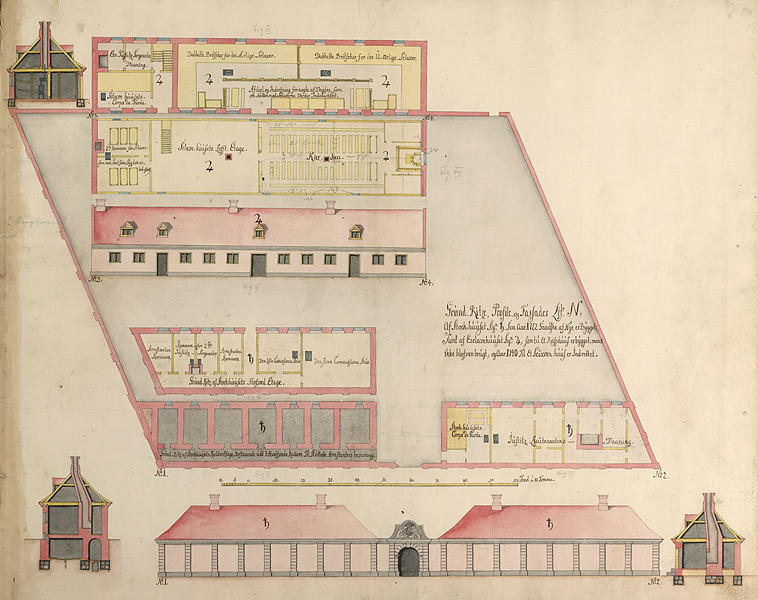
Dracing by Samuel Christoph Gedde (1754)

The Stocks House was built in 1677. Prior to that physical punishment had taken place at Jarmers Tower. The building was altered by Elias David Häusser between 1722 and 1724.

In 1741 the Stocks House was opened to civilian prisoners and it became a place for people who had been sentenced to "slavery", that is prisoners sentenced to penal labour in iron. A distinction was made between "honest" and "dishonest" prisoners, the latter being those who had been beaten at the whipping post (Danish: Kag), a punishment which was not just corporal but associated with loss of honor.

In 1783 the institution was dramatically expanded when the Greater Stocks House, with a capacity for 600 "slaves", was opened next to the old building.

On 30 December 1771 the use of "severe examination" (torture) was abolished by Johann Friedrich Struensee but it was reintroduced after his fall. In 1837 torture was again abolished.

On 1 April 1860 the Stocks House was closed by the Ministry of Justice, prisoners were transferred to the Vridsløselille State Prison which had been constructed in accordance with the Philadelphia System. In 1929 the building is demolished when Polytechnical University of Denmark is expanded.

== See also ==
- Copenhagen Court House
