= Rigensgade =

Street in Copenhagen, Denmark

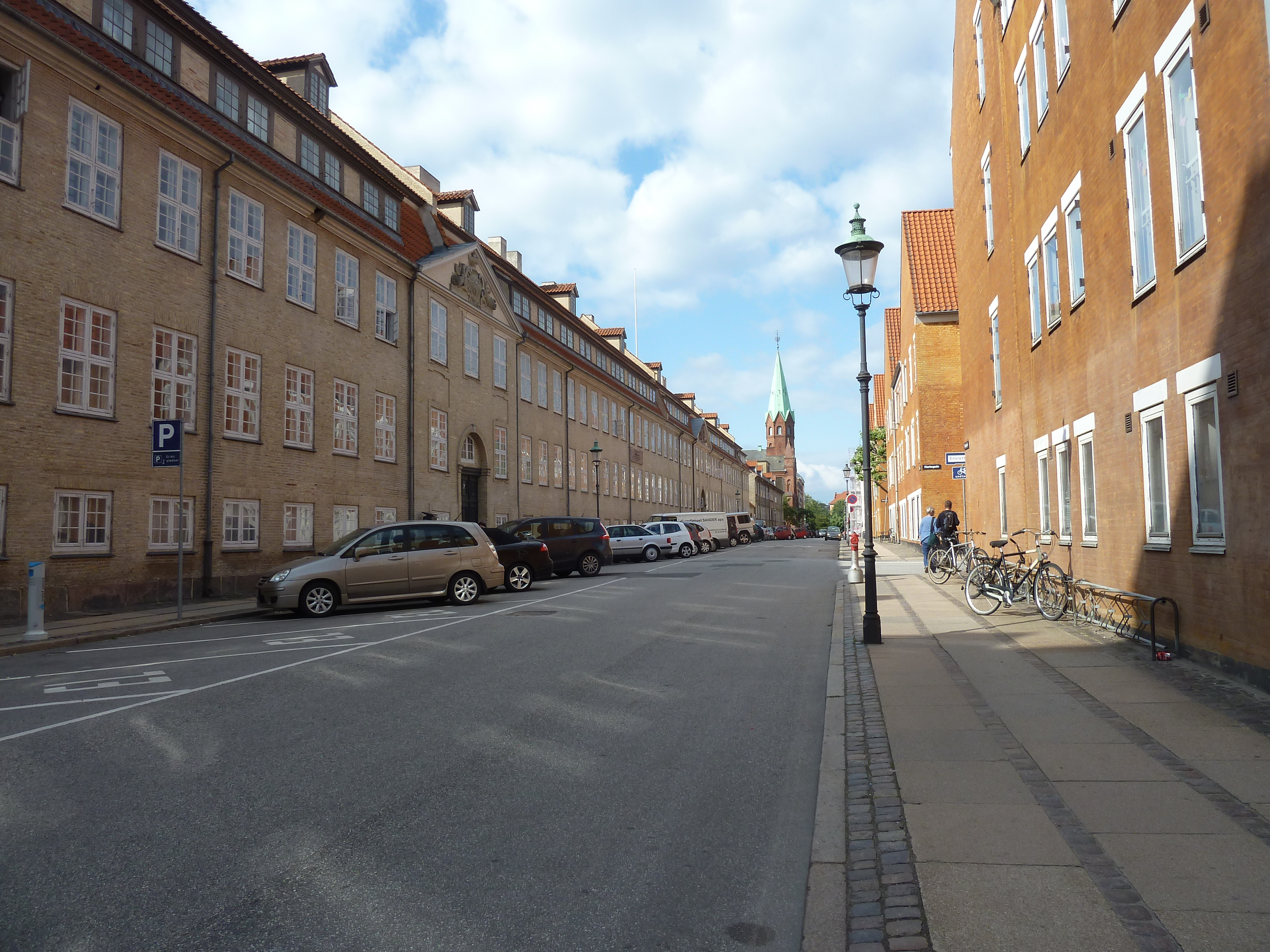
- A view down Åbenrå from the northern end of the street
- Interactive map of Rigensgade
- Length: 418 m (1,371 ft)
- Location: Indre By, Copenhagen, Denmark
- Postal code: 1316
- Nearest metro station: Nørreport (west), Østerport (east)
- Coordinates: 55°41′17.88″N 12°35′0.6″E

Rigensgade (lit. 'State Street') is a street in central Copenhagen, Denmark. It links Sølvgade in the west with Øster Voldgade in the east. An underpass for pedestrians links the beginning of the street with Rosenborg Castle Gardens on the other side of Sølvgade. Notable buildings include the former Garrison Hospital and the Methodist Jerusalem's Church.

== History ==
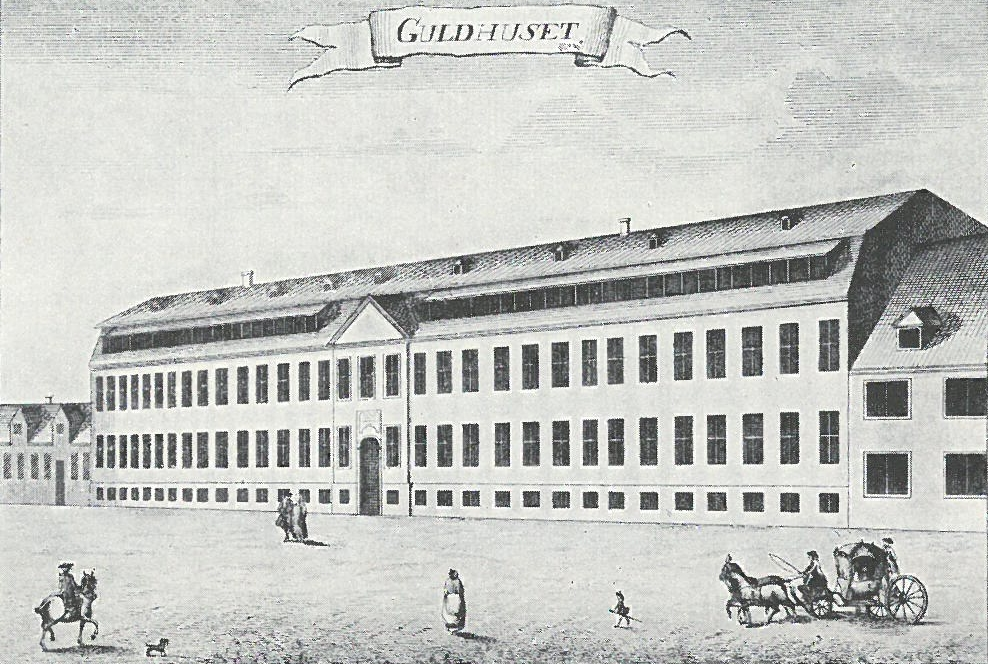
The Gold House

Rigensgade originates in the 1649 plan for New Copenhagen, the large area which was included in the fortified city when the old East Rampart along present-day Gothersgade was decommissioned and a new one was built in a more northerly direction. According to the plan, the streets in the area were to be named after Danish territorial possessions, royalty and the upper classes. The shape of the Nyboder development indicates that the original intention was to create a street parallel to Adelgade and Borgergade at the site.

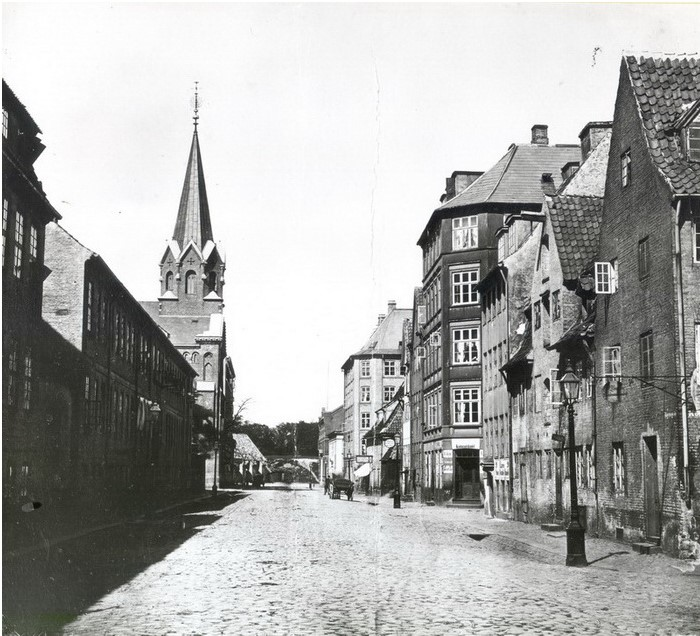
Rigensgade in c. 1910

At the far end of the street was an open area, Grønland (Greenland), which was used as a military drill ground. It was also known as Rigens Marskalks Plads, but by 1679 the name had already passed out of use.

The so-called Gold House, am alchemist laboratory, was located at the beginning of the street. It was converted into a military hospital in 1673 and later into a royal textile factory which moved to Usserød in 1815. The site was then taken over by the Garrison Hospital. In 1683, Christian V purchased the buildings and used them as a textile factory.

== Notable buildings ==
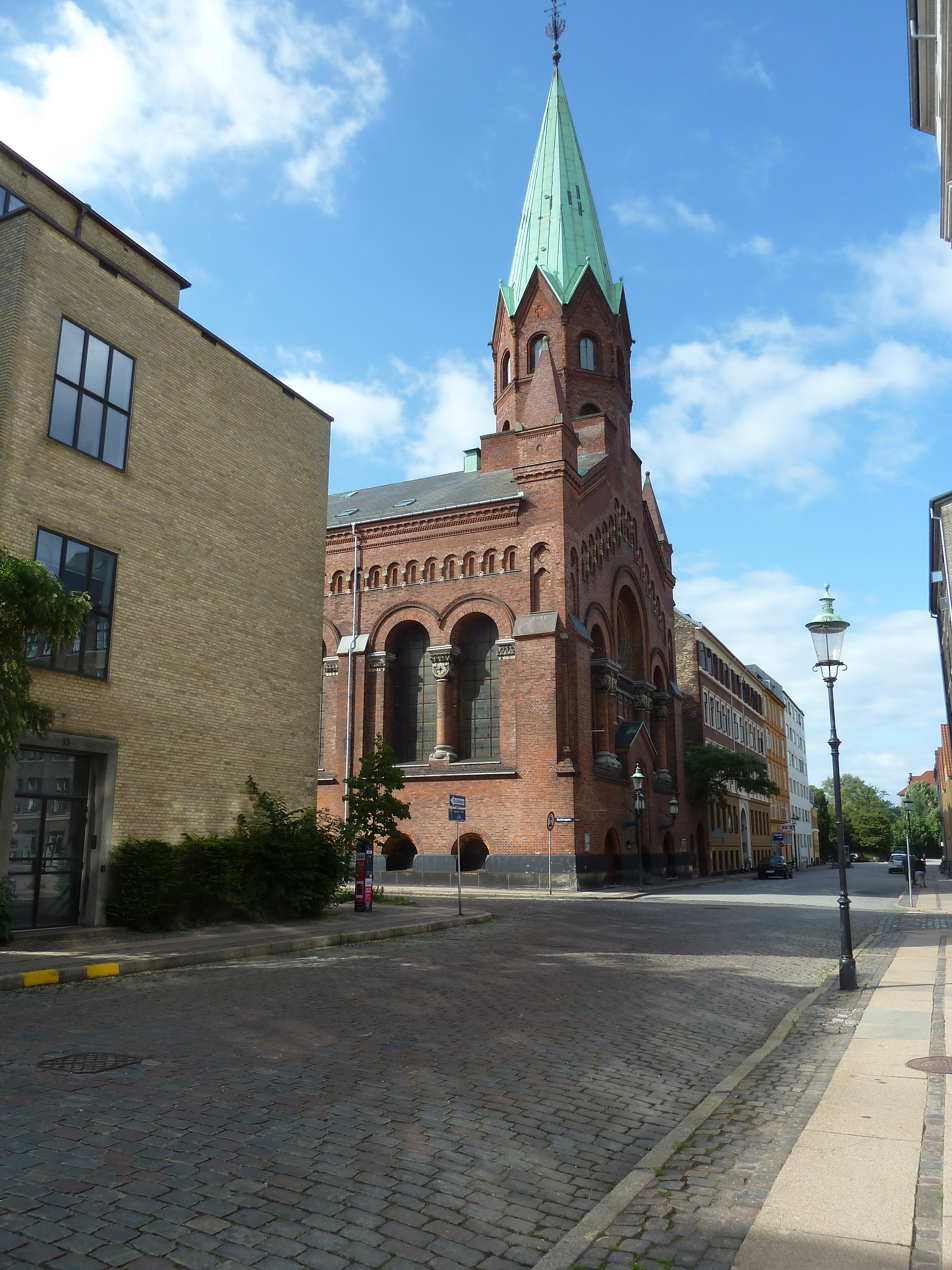
Jerusalem's Church

The former Garrison Hospital was converted into residences for officers of the Royal Danish Army. The 48-bay, Neoclassical building dates from 1760 and an extension in 1779.

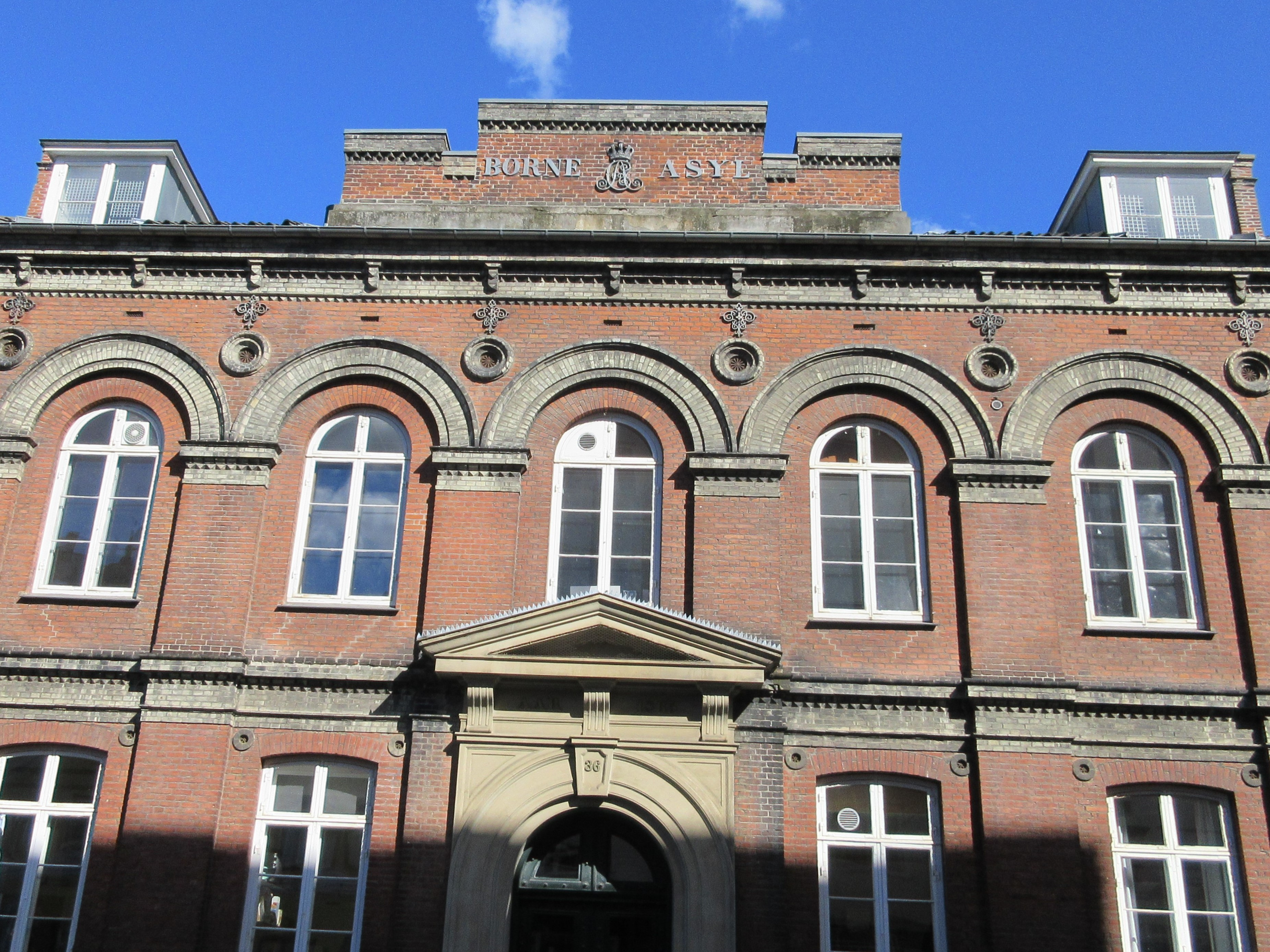
No. 36; Caroline Amalies Asyl

No. 13 is part of a complex fronting Øster Voldgade which was originally built for the College of Advanced Technology. It now houses GEUS and Gefion Gymnasium.

Jerusalem's Church is the main church of the Methodist community in Denmark. It first opened in 1866.

H.P. Lorentzens Stiftelse (Np. 30) was built to provide free and affordable housing for widows in difficult circumstances, Caroline Amalies Asyl at No. 36 is also from 1866. It was designed by Henrik Steffens Sibbern.
