= Gernersgade =

Street in Copenhagen, Denmark

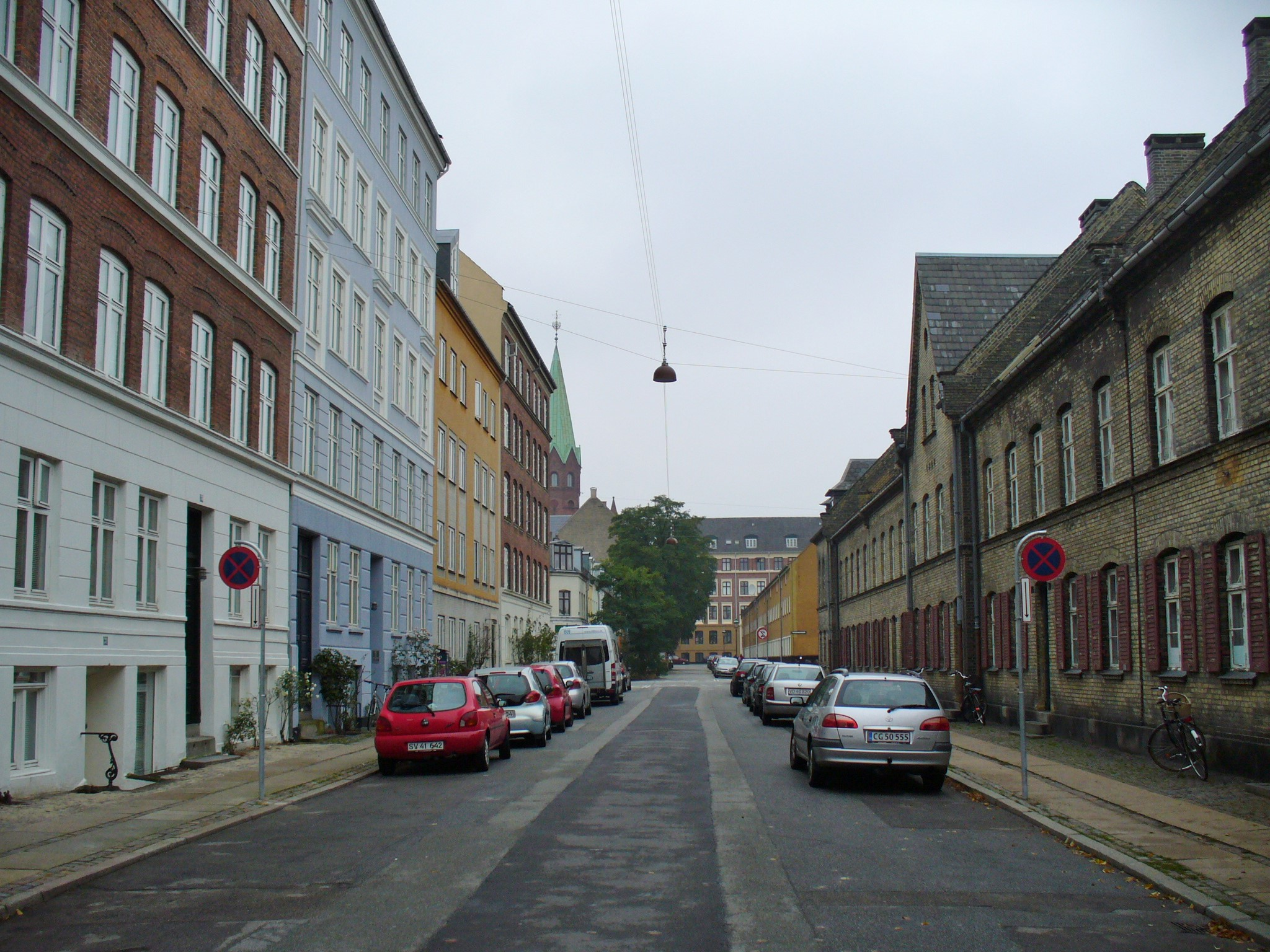
- Length: 427 m (1,401 ft)
- Location: Indre By, Copenhagen, Denmark
- Postal code: 1319
- Nearest metro station: Kongens Nytorv
- Coordinates: 55°41′17.88″N 12°35′12.3″E

Gernersgade is a street in the Nyboder Quarter of central Copenhagen, Denmark. It runs from Store Kongensgade in the southeast to Rigensgade in the northwest and is closed to through traffic at Sankt Pauls Plads.

== History ==
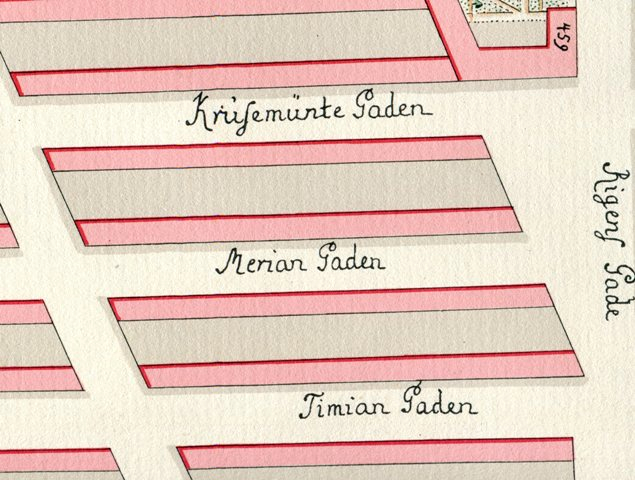
Mariangade seen on a detail from Gedde's district map of Sankt Annæ Vester Kvarter

Gernersgade traces its history back to Christian IV's foundation of the Nyboder naval barracks in 1631 but different sections of it were originally known under individual names. The section from Store Kongensgade to Borgergade is on Gedde's district map of Sankt Annæ Vestre Kvarter called Hinde Længden (The Doe Row) while the section from Borgergade to Adelgade was called Gamle Gade (Old Street) and the section from Adelgade to Rigensgade is called Meriangade /Marjoram Street). Two of the names follow the general naming practice of Nyboder where the streets in the eastern part of the quarter is named after animal species and streets in the western part is named after herbs and medical plants.

Hinde Længden was later renamed Nygade (New Street) while Gamlegade was renamed Kanelgade (Cinnamon Street). In 1859 Nygade was renamed Gernersgade to commemorate the naval officer and shipbuilder Henrik Gerner. Kanelgade and Meriangade was included in Gernersgade in 1893.

== Notable buildings and residents ==
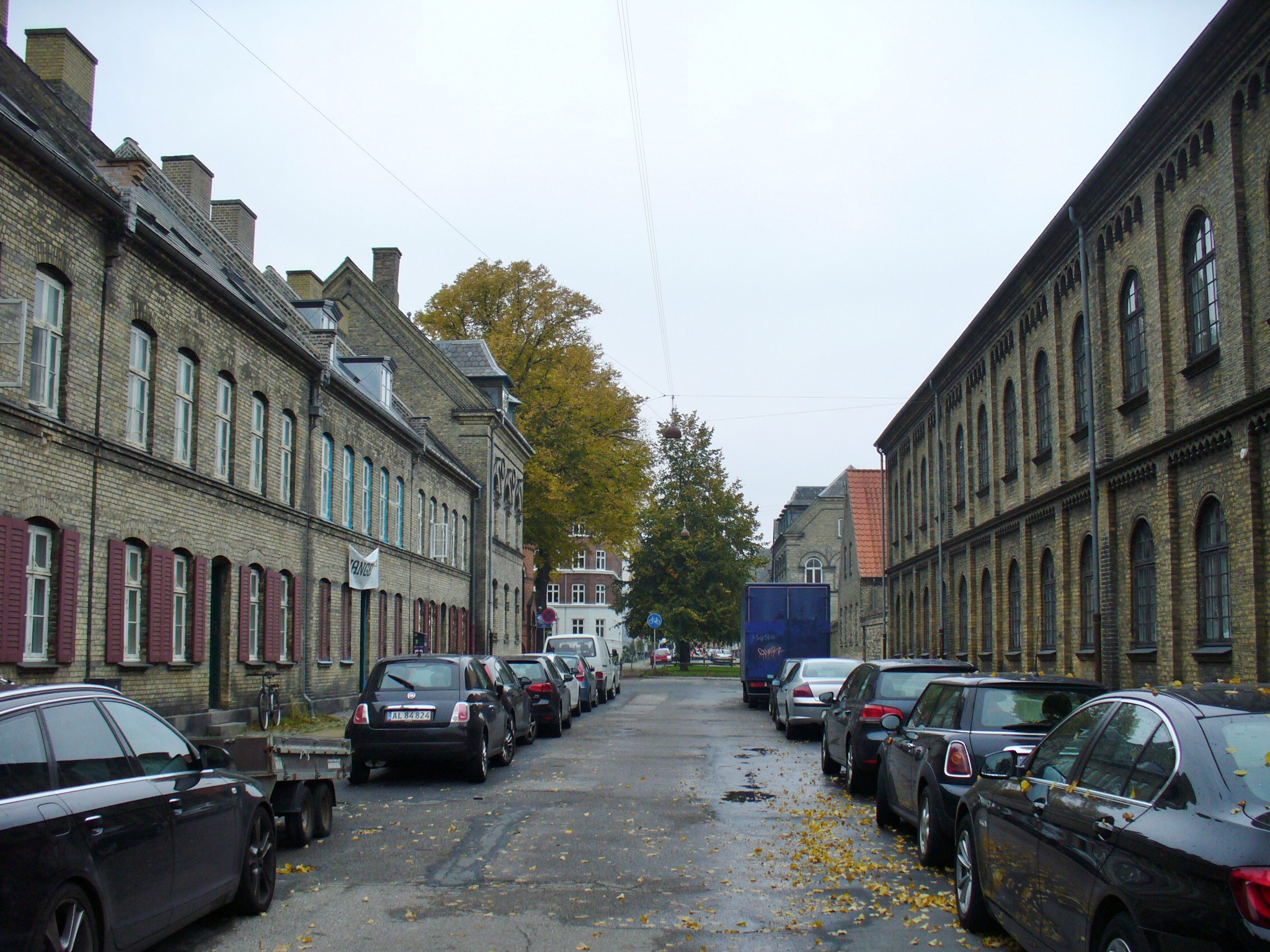
A Grey Row to the left (No. 17-31) and the former Gernersgade Barracks on the right

The Nyboder houses that now line part of the street do not date from Christian IV's time but are later models. The yellow, two-storey terrace at No. 2-18 is an example of the houses that now dominate the quarter. They date from the 1750s and were designed by Philip de Lange. The terraces at No. 17-31 and No. 24-44 are examples of the so-called Grey Rows that were built between 1886 and 1893 to design by Olaf Schmidt with inspiration from Arbejdernes Byggeforening's building society houses.

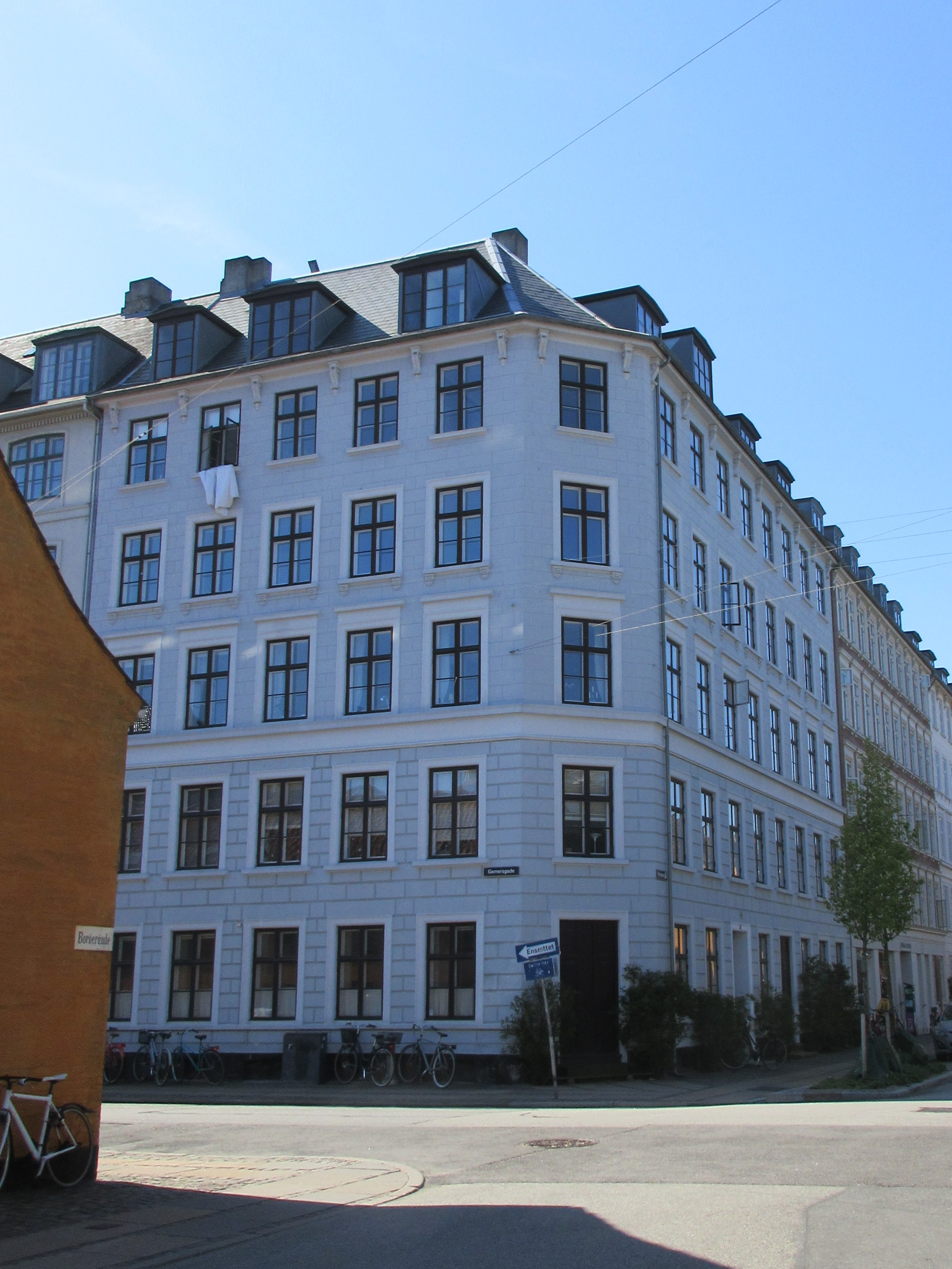
Norgergade 144: Building from 1854

Bygningskulturens Hus, a centre dedicated to historic architecture, is located at the corner with Borgergade. The building was originally constructed as a girls' school for daughters of personnel of the Royal Danish Navy but was later converted into a naval cadet academy and then army barracks. Realea (now Realdania Byg) acquired the building in 2003 and it was subsequently put through a comprehensive refurbishment which adapted it to its current use.

The building at the opposite corner with Borgergade (Borgergade 144) is from 1854 and was possibly designed by Peter Christoph Hagemann. It was listed on the Danish Registry of Protected Buildings and Places in 1978.

The townhouses at No. 49-67 were built in 1870–72 by Frederik Bøttger for Arbejdernes Byggeforening to provide affordable, good-quality homes for workers at the B&W shipyard. More of the same type of houses are located in the neighbouring street Krussemyntegade. St. Paul's Church, whose chancel faces Gernersgade, is from 1877 and was designed by Johannes Emil Gnudtzmann.
