= Sankt Pauls Gade =

Street in Copenhagen, Denmark

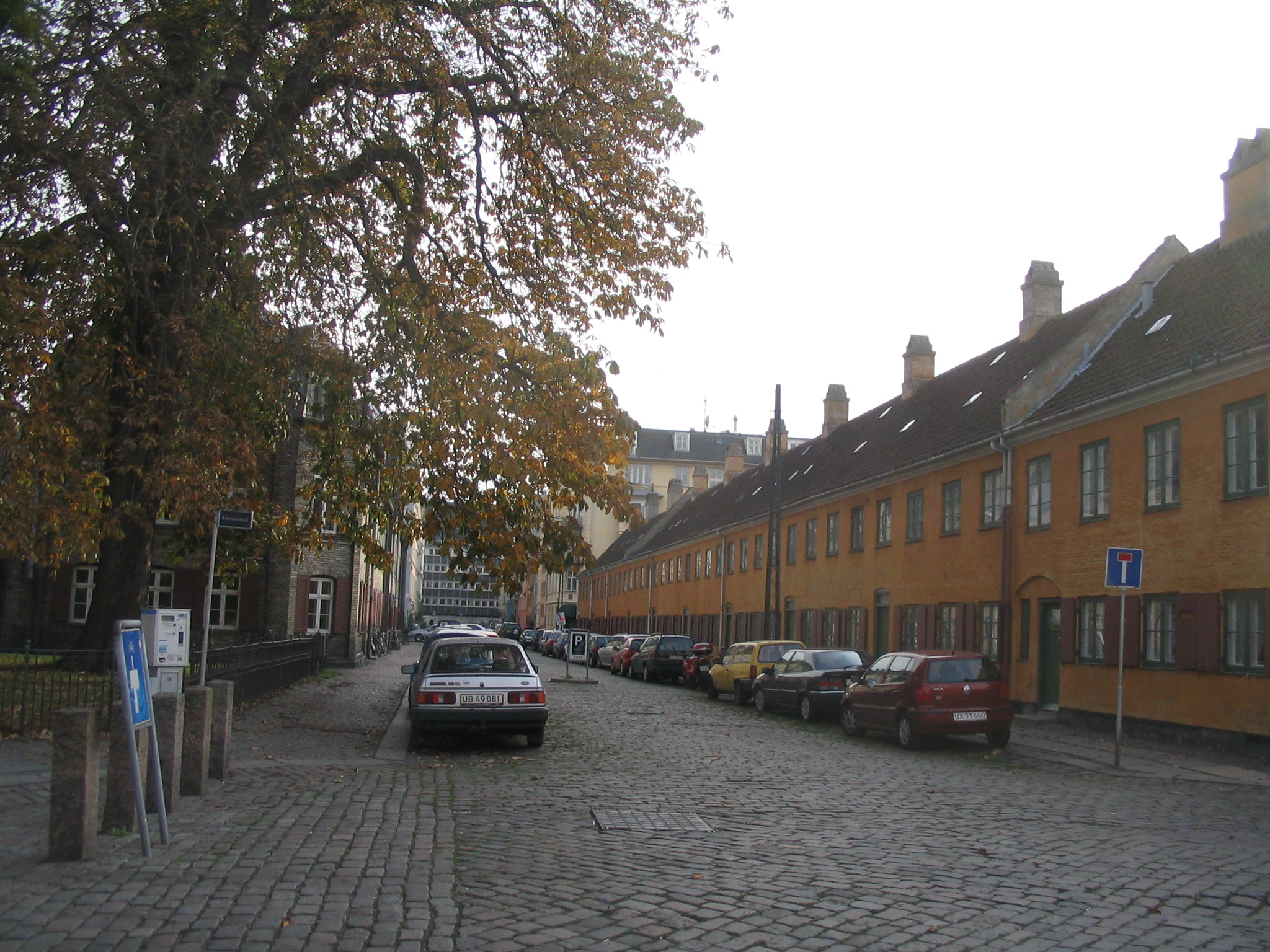
Sankt Pauls Gade with a Nyboder terrace to the right

Sankt Pauls Gade (lit. St. Paul's Street) is a street in the Nyboder Quarters of central Copenhagen, Denmark. The street passes St. Paul's Church from which it takes its name. The space in front of the church is called Sankt Pauls Plads (St. Paul's Square).

== History ==
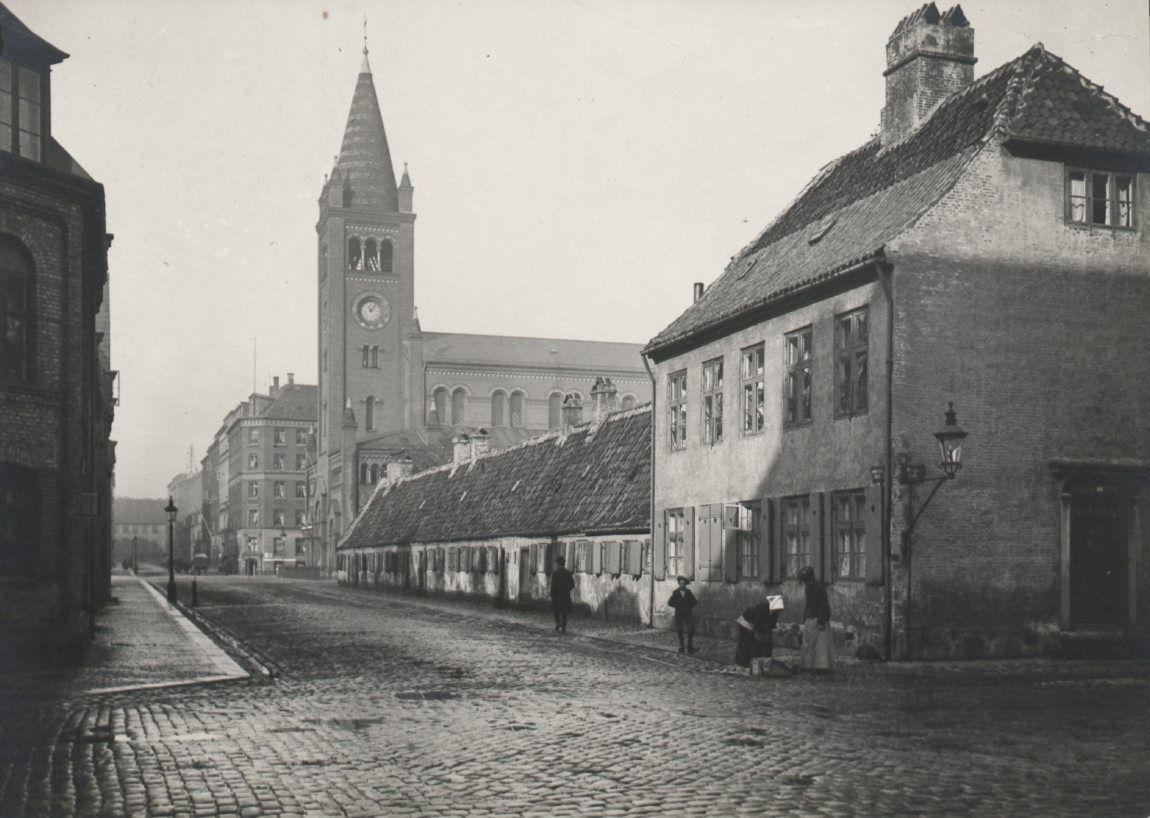
Sankt Pauls Gade in 1897

Olfert Fischers Gade traces its history back to Christian IV's foundation of Nyboder naval barracks in 1931 but different sections of it were then known under individual names. The section from Store Kongensgade to Borgergade was called Pindsvinegade (Hedgehog Street), the section from Borgergade to Kronprinsessegade was called Enhjørningsgade (Unicorn Street) and the section from Kronprinsessegade to Rigensgade was called Salviegade (Sage Street). The street names followed the general naming practive in Nyboder where the streets in the eastern part of the area were named after animal species and the streets in the western part of the area were named after herbs and medical plants.

The Nyboder area was located outside Copenhagen's city until the area known as New Copenhagen was incorporated into the fortified city by moving the East Rampart. This had been the plan from before Nyboder was planned but had been delayed due to lack of funding.

The Nyboder terraces in Pindsvinegade were replaced by taller buildings in the 1850s. Several of the buildings were built by a wealthy merchant named H. P. Lorentzens and the street was renamed Lorentzensgade in 1855. In 1891, Lorentzensgade, Enhjørningsgade and Salviegade were renamed Sankt Pauls Gade after St. Paul's Church.

== Notable buildings ==
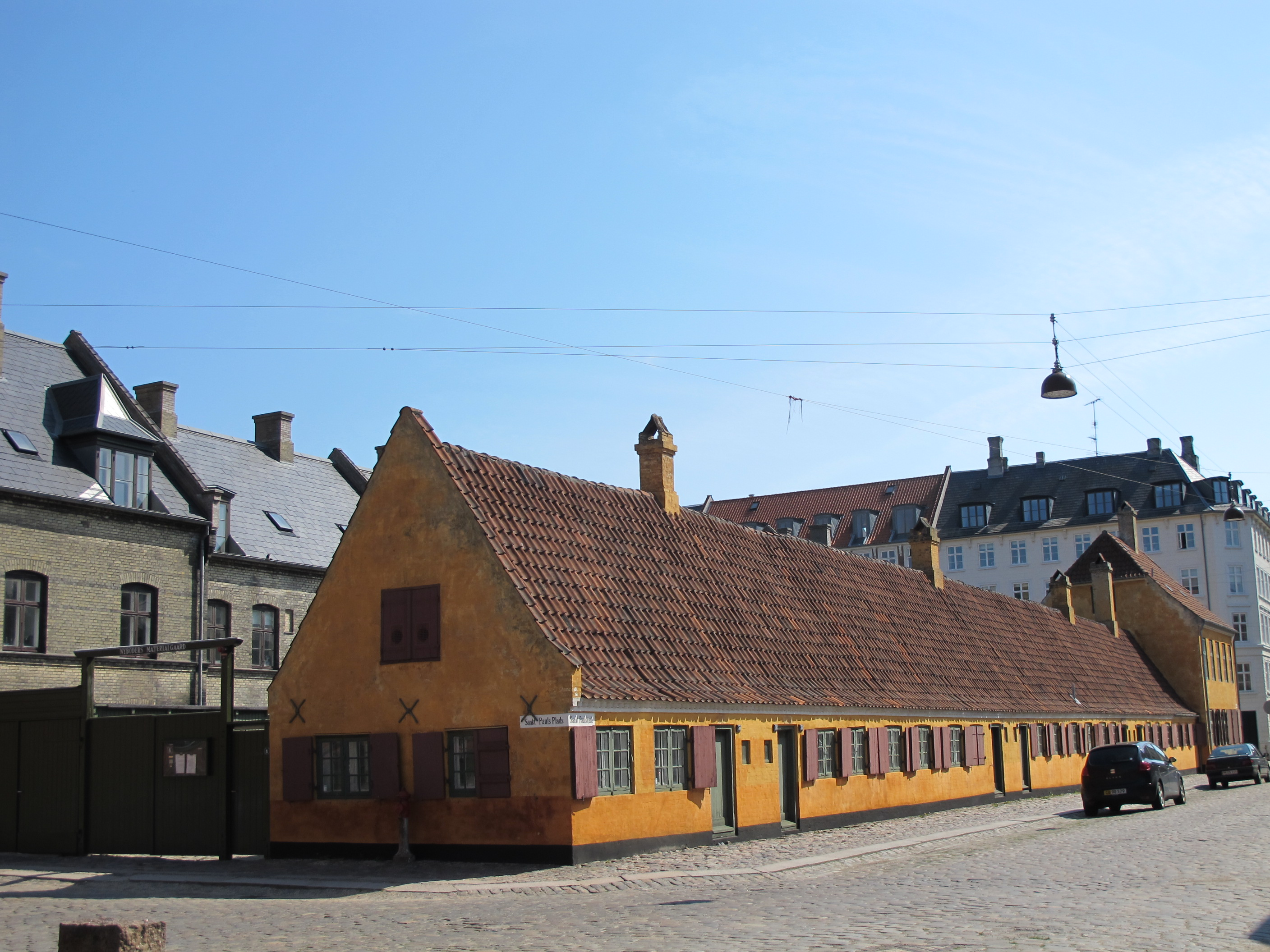
The single-storey Nyboder terrace with the Factory Master's House at the far end

Sankt Pauls Gade is home to the only single-storey terrace that survives from Nyboder's earliest days. It now contains a small museum dedicated to the history of the development. At the eastern end of the terrace (towards Borgergade) is a short two-storey section known as the Factory Master's House (Fabriksmesterens Hus). It is the result of an expansion in 1817. The Factory Master headed the construction of new ships at Nyholm.

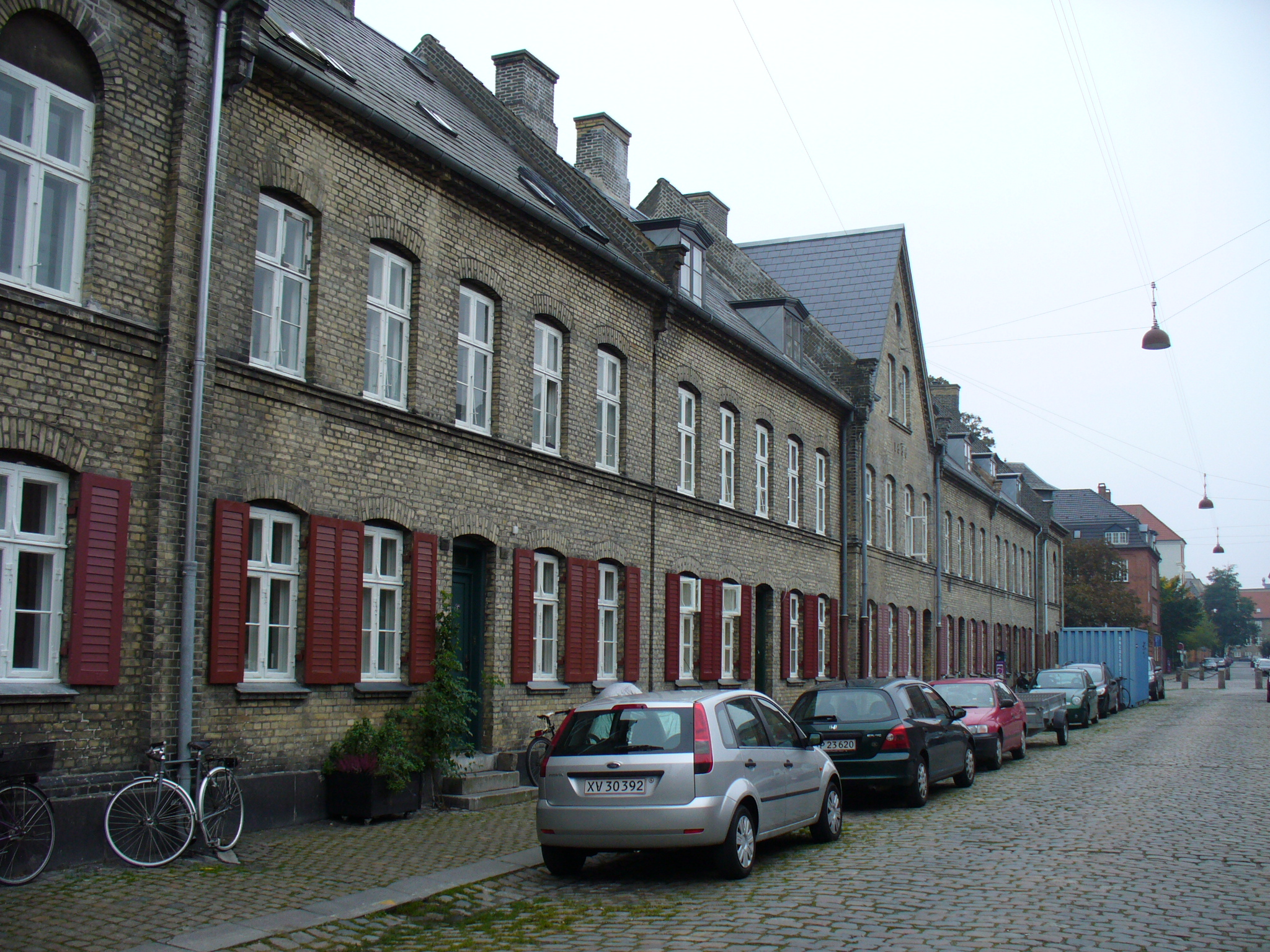
No. 15-31: A Grey Row

Across the street from the single-storey Nyboder terrace at No. 15-31 is one of the so-called Grey Rows which were built in 1886–1893 to designed by Olaf Schmidth. They were designed with inspiration from Arbejdernes Byggeforening's building society houses. The Grey Rows are most spacious at the end which contained apartments for officers.

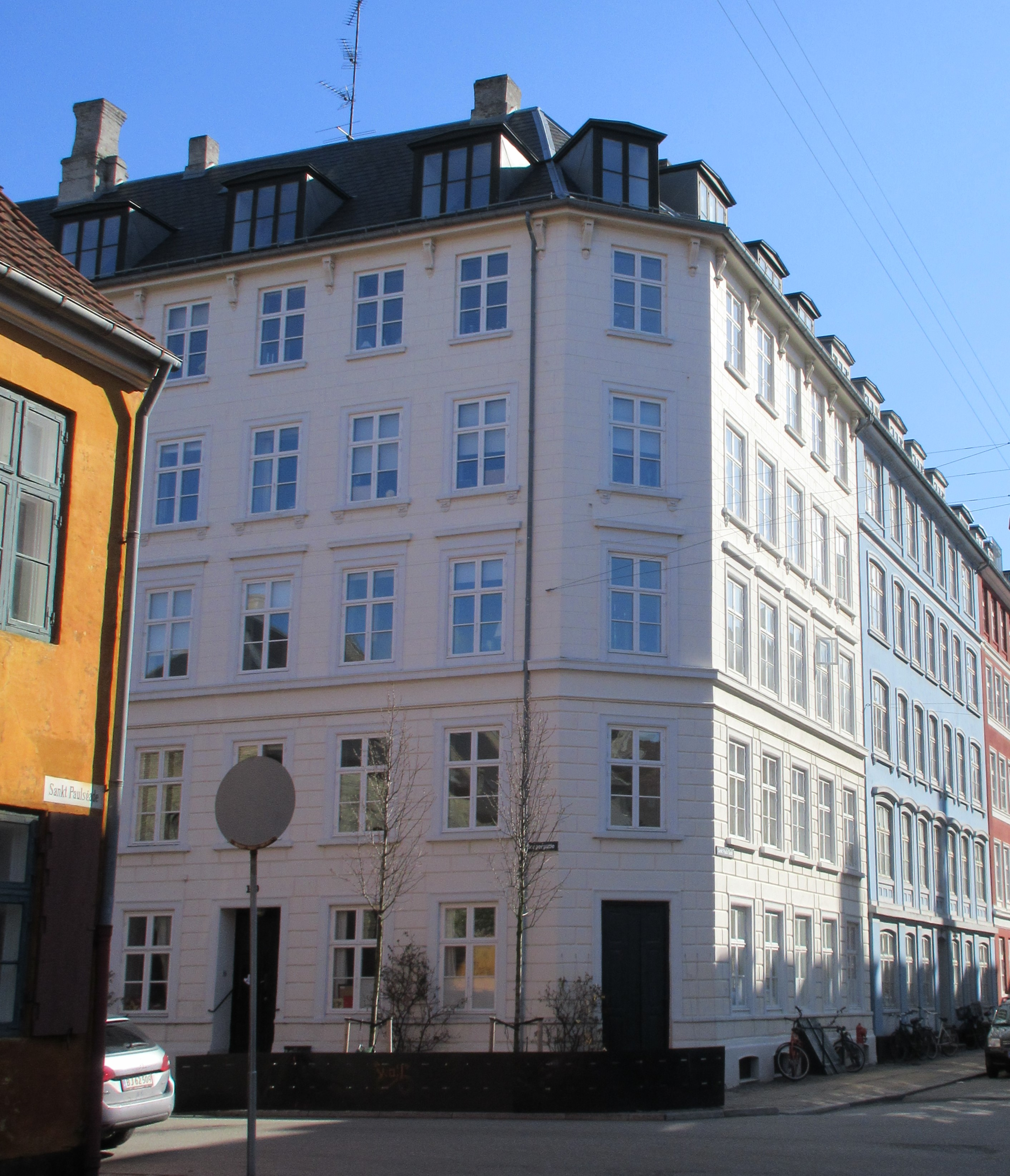
Listed building on the corner with Borgergade

The corner building on the other side of Borgergade (Norgergade 140) is from 1854 and was probably designed by Peter Christoph Hagemann. It was listed on the Danish Registry of Protected Buildings and Places in 1984.

St.Paul's Church is built in red brick and was designed by Johannes Emil Gnudtzmann.
