= Kochsvej =

Street in Copenhagen, Denmark

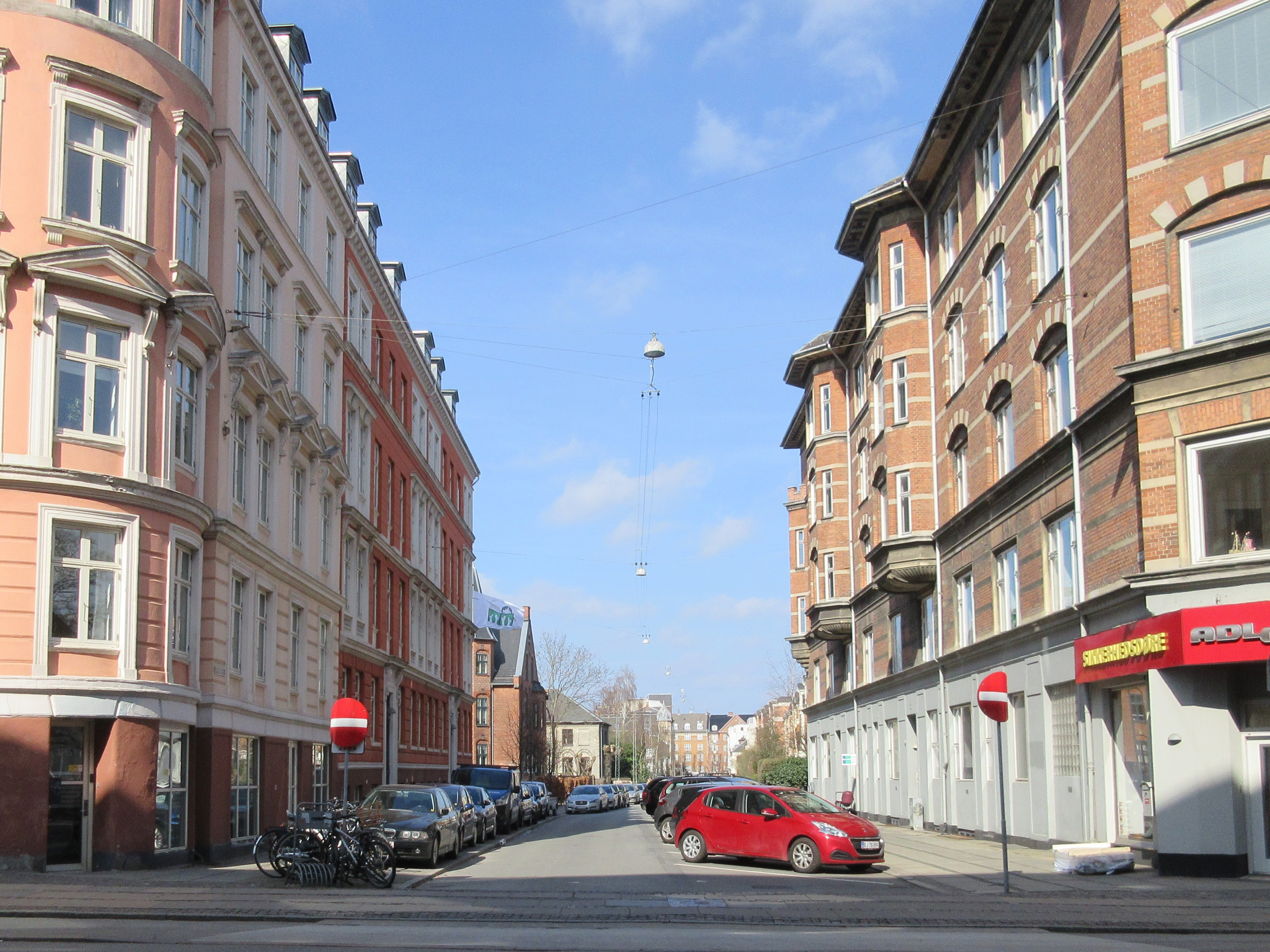
- Interactive map of Kochsvej
- Length: 408 m (1,339 ft)
- Location: Copenhagen, Denmark
- Quarter: Frederiksberg
- Nearest metro station: Frederiksberg Allé
- North end: Frederiksberg Allé
- South end: Vesterbrogade

Kochsvej is a minor, mainly residential street in the Frederiksberg district of Copenhagen, Denmark, between Frederiksberg Alléto the north and Vesterbrogade to the south.

== History ==
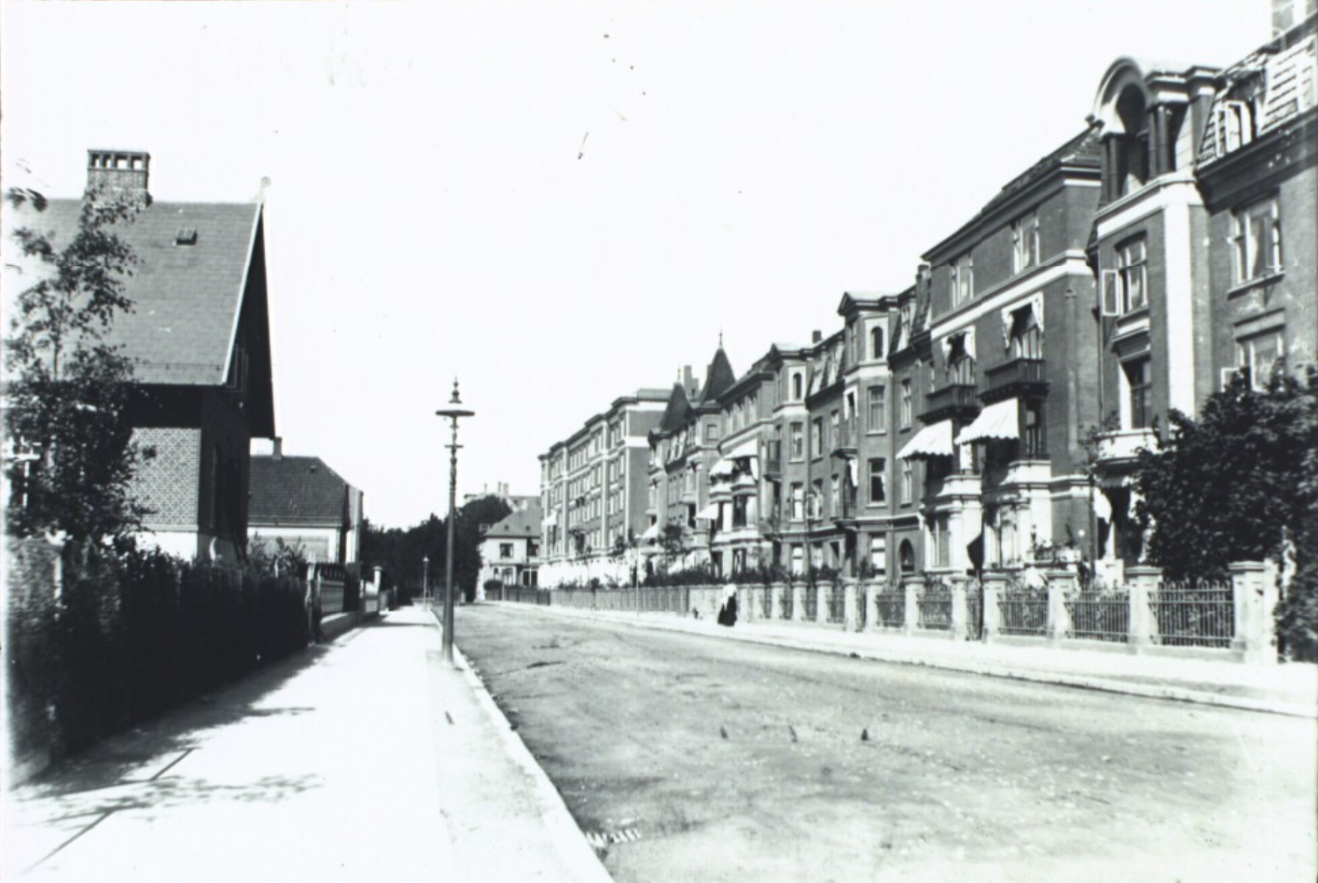
Kochsvej photographed by Emil Stæhr in the 1900s

The land at the site was in the mid-1880s part of F. J. Koch's market gardens. The street was created when he started to sell the land off in lots to members of the higher middle-class for house construction. The name was officially adopted in 1885. The last market gardens, on the east side of the street, disappeared in 1895. The trend in the area had by then shifted from houses to apartment buildings

== Buildings ==
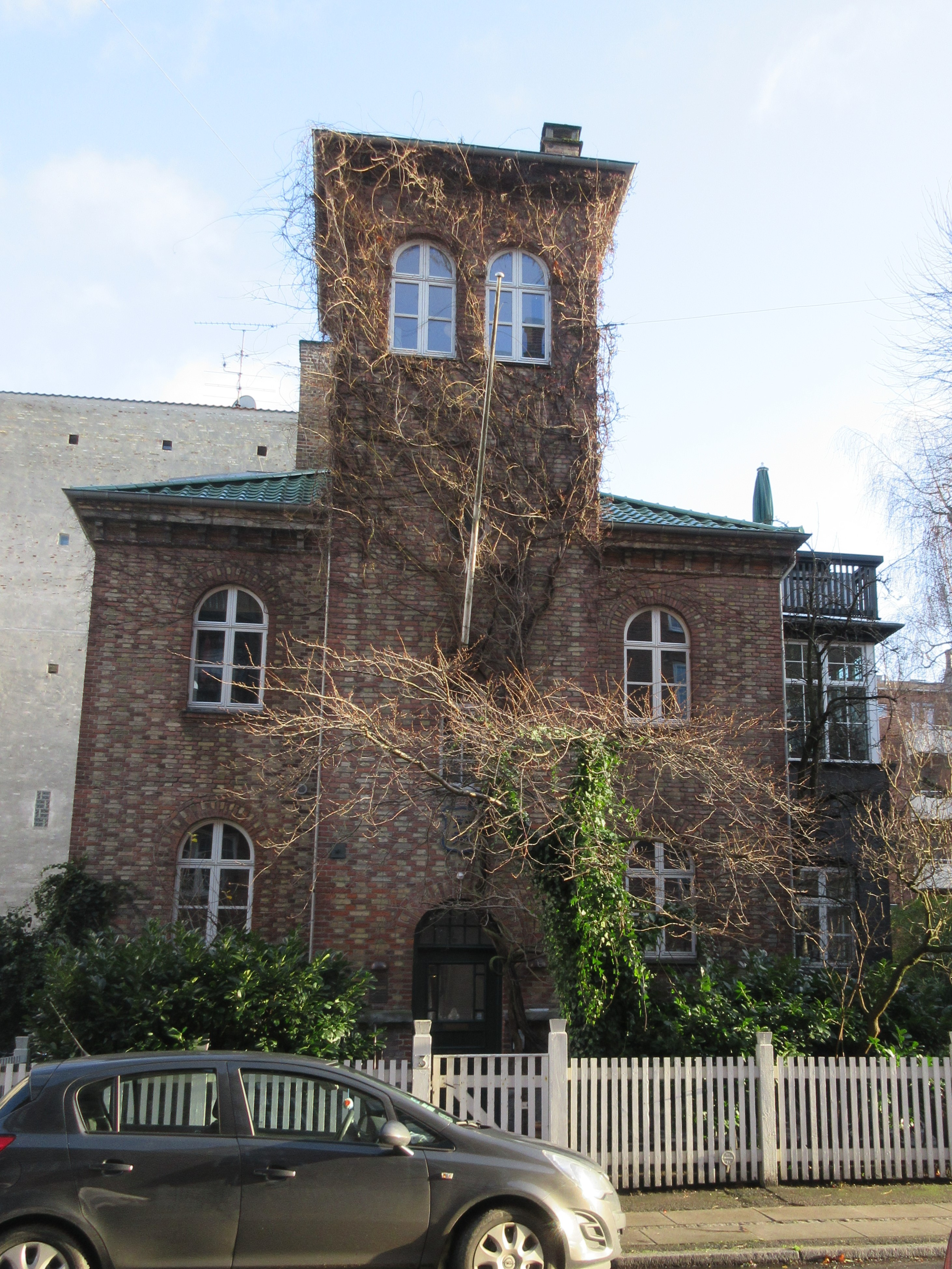
No. 3

The two oldest houses with addresses on Kochsvej are considerably older than the street. The house at No. 3 was built for music teacher Adolph Lund in 1852. The building was designed by Bernhard Seidelin. The neighbor at No. 5A is from 1867.

The house at No. 24 was built for the namesake gardener F. J. Koch's use. It was completed in 1898 to a design by the architect Julius Schmidth.

The villa at No. 18 (11900, SAVE value 3) was designed by Thorvald Jørgensen. It now houses the head office of the London Toast Theatre.

The two large villas at No. 30 and No. 32 were both built in 1901 to designs by H.P.N. Hedemann. Frederik Barfod's School, a private primary school with roots dating back to 1834, is now based in the three villas at No. 32-35.

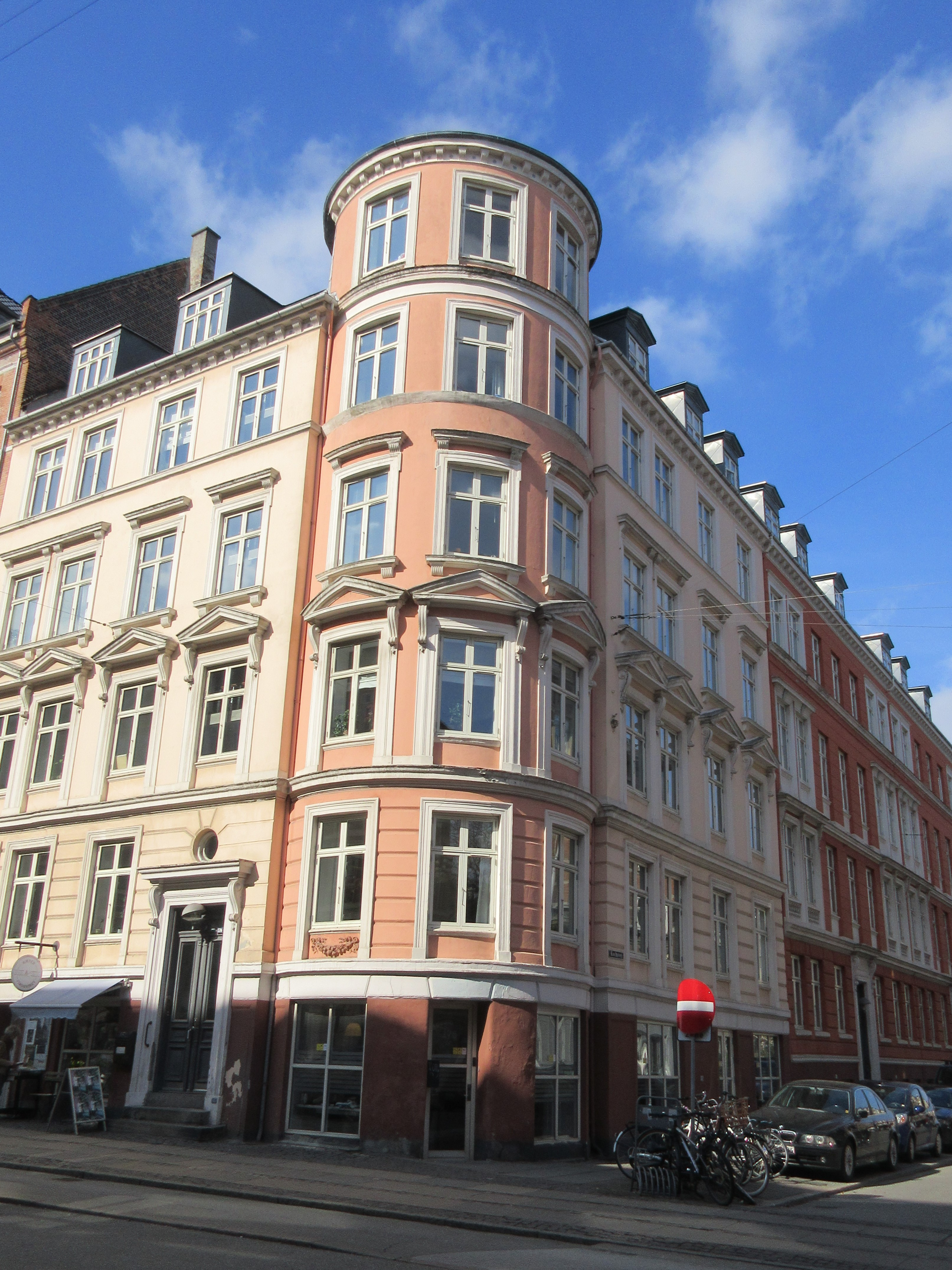
Kochsvej 44-46 / Vesterbrogade 176 (1888)

The corner building at Kochsvej 44-46 / Vesterbrogade 176 is from 1888 and was built by master builder O. Strassen, The corner building on the other side of the street (Kochsvej 35-37 / Vesterbrogade 174) is from 1899 and was constructed by master builder P. Christensen. The corner building at Frederiksberg Allé 53/Kochsvej 2 is from 1904 and was designed by Ole Boye in collaboration with Ludvig Andersen.

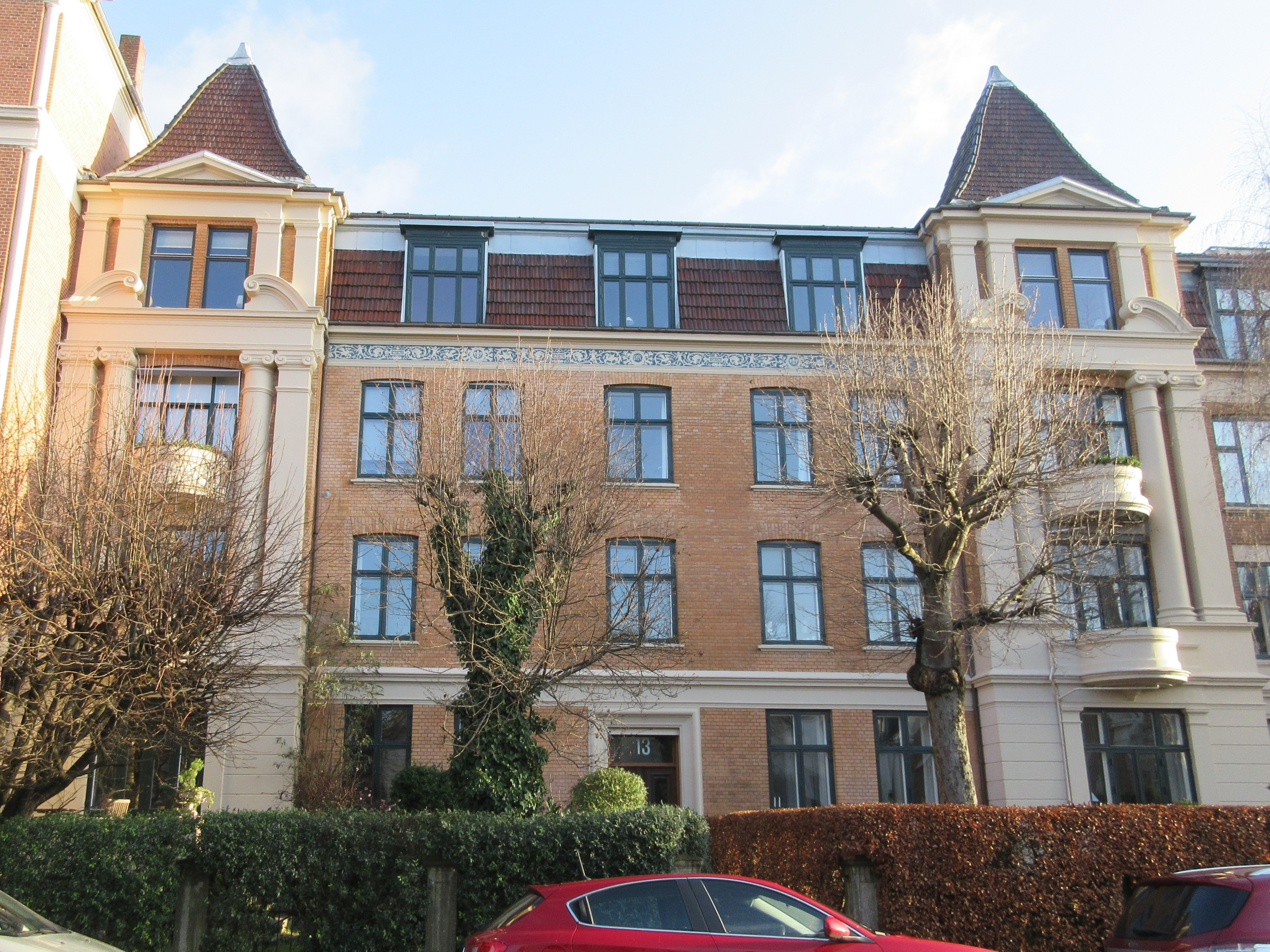
No. 13

The Historicist apartment building at No. 21-33 is from 1897 to 1901 and was designed by Johannes Zehngraff. The Historicist apartment buildings at No. 7-11 and No. 13 are from 1898 and were both designed by Julius Bagger. The Historicist apartment building at No. 15 is from 1897.

The Rococo Revival style apartment building at No. 6-8 is from 1905 and was designed by C. W. Christiansen.

== Transport ==
The Frederiksberg Allé metro station is located just east of the northern end of the street.

== Notable people ==
- Jacob Ellehammer (1871–1946), inventor and aviation pioneer, lived on Kochsvej when he first moved to Copenhagen Nykøbing Falster. He initially lived in the ground floor at No. 11 and from 1905 to 1918 at No. 15.
- Paul Hagen (1920–2003), actor, lived on the 3rd floor at No. 29 in 1955–1958.
- Anna Hude (1858–1934), historian, lived on the ground floor at No. 29 in 1907 – 1909
