= Bernhard Seidelin =

Danish architect

Bernhard Seidelin (1820–1863) was a Danish architect. His most notable works include Helsingør station and Nyboder Girls' School.

== Early life and education ==
Seidelin was born at Sankt Hans Hospital in Roskilde, the son of medical doctor at Sankt Hans Hospital Johannes Henrik Seidelin and Johanne Marie Petersen. He apprenticed as a mason before enrolling at the Royal Danish Academy of Fine Arts in 1840. He initially studied under G. F. Hetsch and later under Michael Gottlieb Bindesbøll who was working on Thorvaldsens Museum. He won the Academy's small silver medal in 1846 and the large silver medal in 1840. He unsuccessfully competed for the gold medal in 1851, 1853 and 1855.

== Career ==
Seidelin's most important works include Helsingør station in Helsingør, Albani Brewery in Odense and Nyboder Girls' School. He also designed a number of large villas for the upper middle class in the new districts that emerged outside Copenhagen's decommissioned fortification ring.

Seidelin was also responsible for the restoration of a number of historic buildings, for instance Amagertorv 6 the interior of Gunderslevholm's main building.

== Personal life ==
Seidelin never married. He fell ill in 1863 and died just 43 years old at the Roydal Frederick's Hospital.

== List of works ==
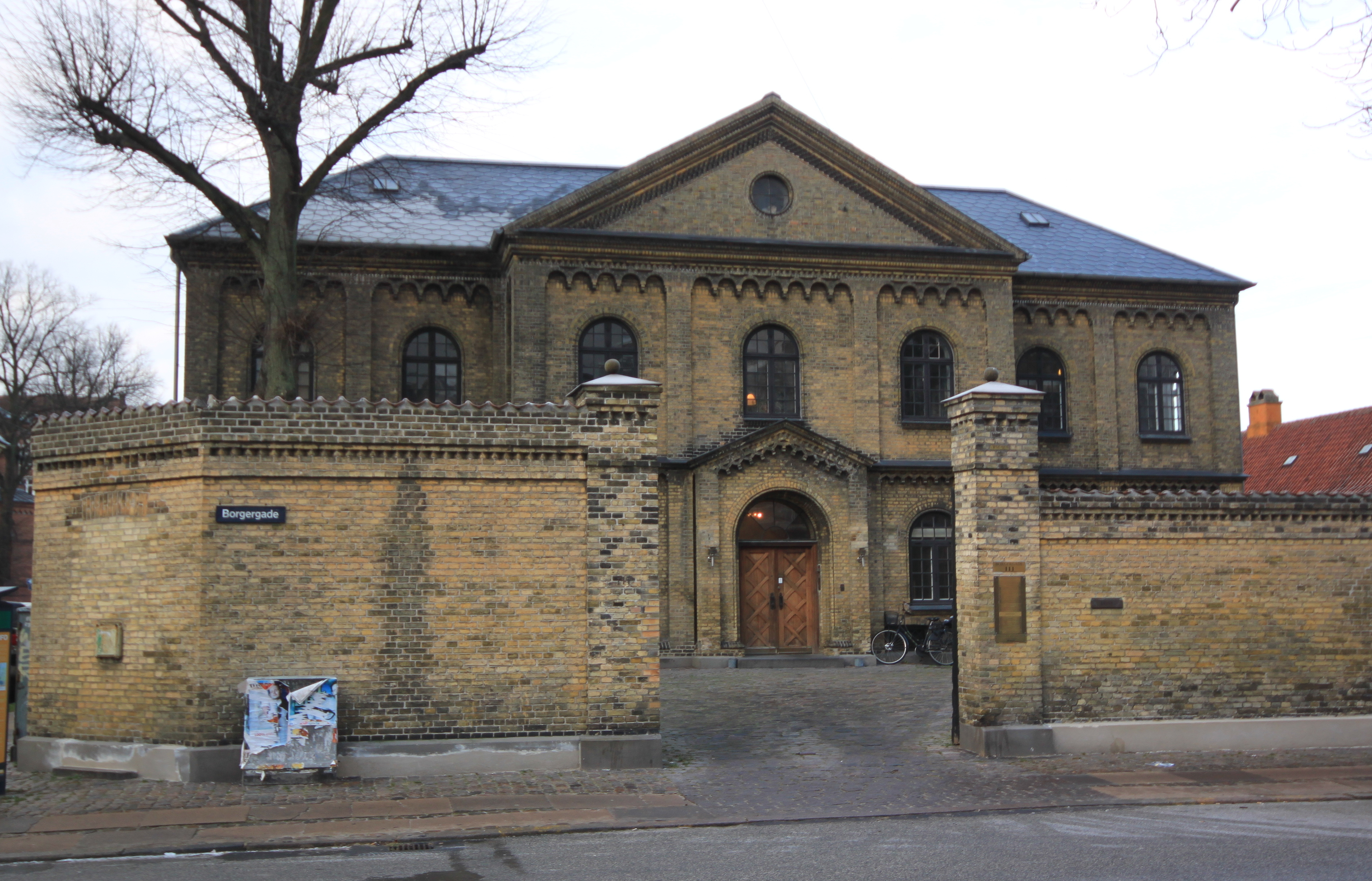
The former Nyboder Girls' School, now Bygningskulturens Hus

- Building for Drewsen, Nørrebrogade 14, Copenhagen (1847)
- Villa for Bugge, Helsingør (1851)
- Villa for Adolph Lund, Kochsvej 3, Frederiksberg (1852)
- New main building, Mørdrupgård, Uggerløse (1852–56)
- Villa for Fiedler, Gammel Kongevej 119, Frederiksberg (1853)
- New south wing, Løvenborg (1853, listed)
- Helsingør Town Hall and Jailhouse, Stengade 59, Helsingør (1853–57)
- Extension of pharmacist Ipsen's property, Holbæk (1853–54)
- Villa for Ferdinand Monrad, Flensburg (1854)
- Villa for merchant Schultz, Blegdamsvej 90, København (1855–56, demolished)
- Main building and stable wing, Egebjerggård, Fyn (1856, listed)
- Ahlgade 34, Holbæk (1856)
- Nyboder Girls' School, Borgergade 11, Copenhagen (1856–59, altered in 1869 and again later, listed)
- Albani Brewery, Tværgade 19, Odense (1859)
- Forpagterbolig, Charlottedal Slagelse (1860)
- Lagerkælder, Albani Brewery, Odense (1862)

=== Restoration ===
- Brostræde 3, Helsingør (1850)
- Matthias Hansen House, Amagertorv 6, Copenhagen (1852)
- Renovation for merchant Seidelin, Ahlgade 90, Holbæk (1853–55)
- Adaption and extension for merchant Kirk, Stengade 70, Helsingør (1856)
- Interior adaption of Gunderslevholm, Skelby (1859)

=== Projects ===
- Royal Naval hospital, Overgaden oven Vandet (undated)
- Rebuilding of Garrison Hospital, Rigensgade, Copenhagen (1850)
- Lighthouse, Christiansø (1854)
- Civic administration building, Saint Thomas, Danish West Indies (1854)
- Custom House, Saint Thomas, Danish West Indies (1855)
- Main building, home farm and gatehouse, Hjuleberg, Sweden (1855)
- Royal Institute for the Blind, Kastelsvej 60, København (1856)

== See also ==
- Seidelin family
