= St. Paul's Church, Copenhagen =

St. Paul's Church
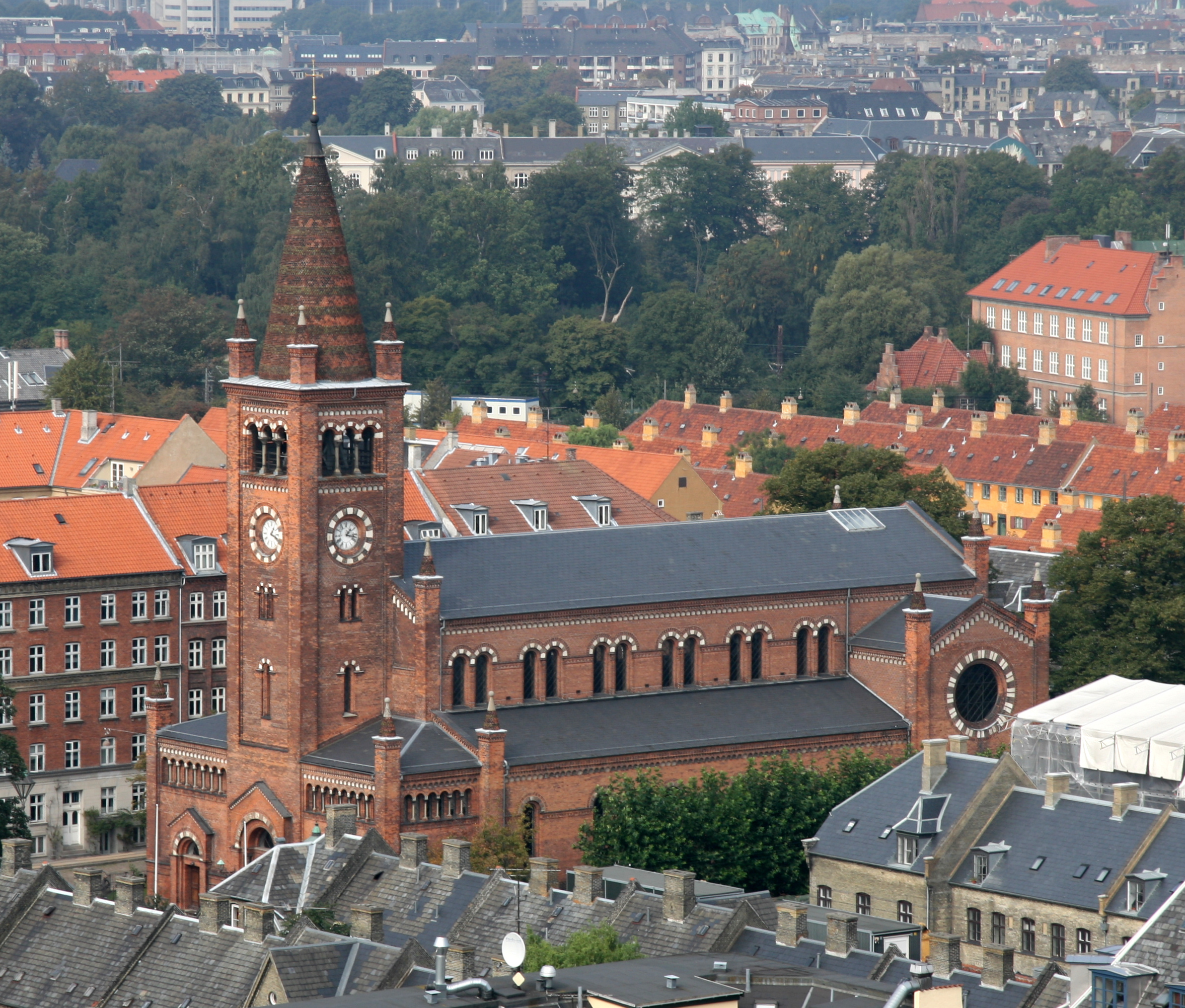
- St. Paul's Church seen from the top of Frederik's Church
- St. Paul's Church
- 55°41′15″N 12°35′15″E
- Location: City centre, Copenhagen
- Country: Denmark
- Denomination: Church of Denmark

History
- Status: Church

Architecture
- Architect: Johannes Emil Gnudtzmann
- Architectural type: Church
- Groundbreaking: 1872
- Completed: 15 February 1877

Specifications
- Materials: Brick

Administration
- Archdiocese: Diocese of Copenhagen

Clergy
- Pastor: Kathrine Lilleør

St. Paul's Church (Danish: Sankt Pauls Kirke) is a Lutheran church in central Copenhagen, Denmark, also colloquially known as Nyboder's Church due to its location in the middle of the Nyboder area. It was designed by Johannes Emil Gnudtzmann and constructed from 1872 to 1877.

== History ==
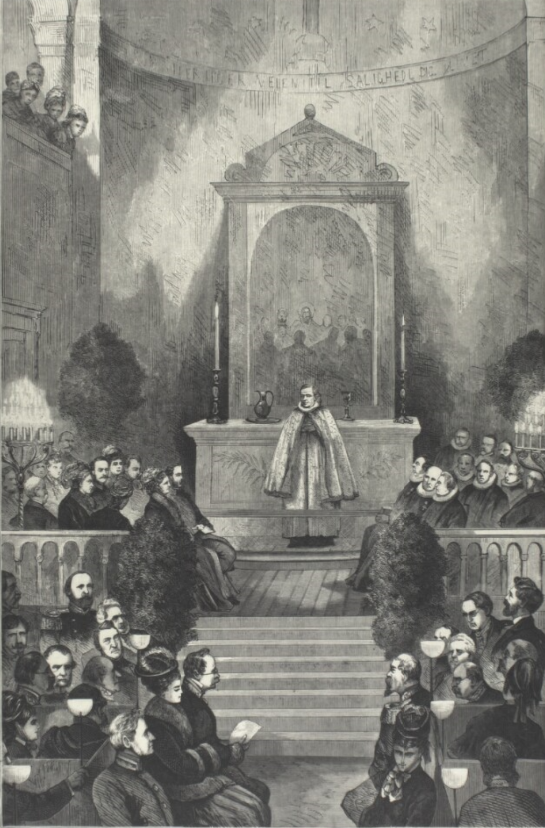
The inauguration of St. Paul's Church on 18 February 1877

The church is part of a wave of church constructions which took place in Copenhagen in the 1870s to provide capacity for the city's growing population. Unlike the other new churches – St. Stephen's and St. James' in Østerbro and St. Mathew's in Vesterbro – St. Paul's was not built in one of the emerging districts outside the city's old fortifications which had just been decommissioned. Johannes Emil Gnudtzmann was charged with the design of the new church. It was his first independent work as an architect. The building was constructed by master mason Vilhelm Køhler (1839-1802). The church was inaugurated on 15 February 1877.

== Architecture ==
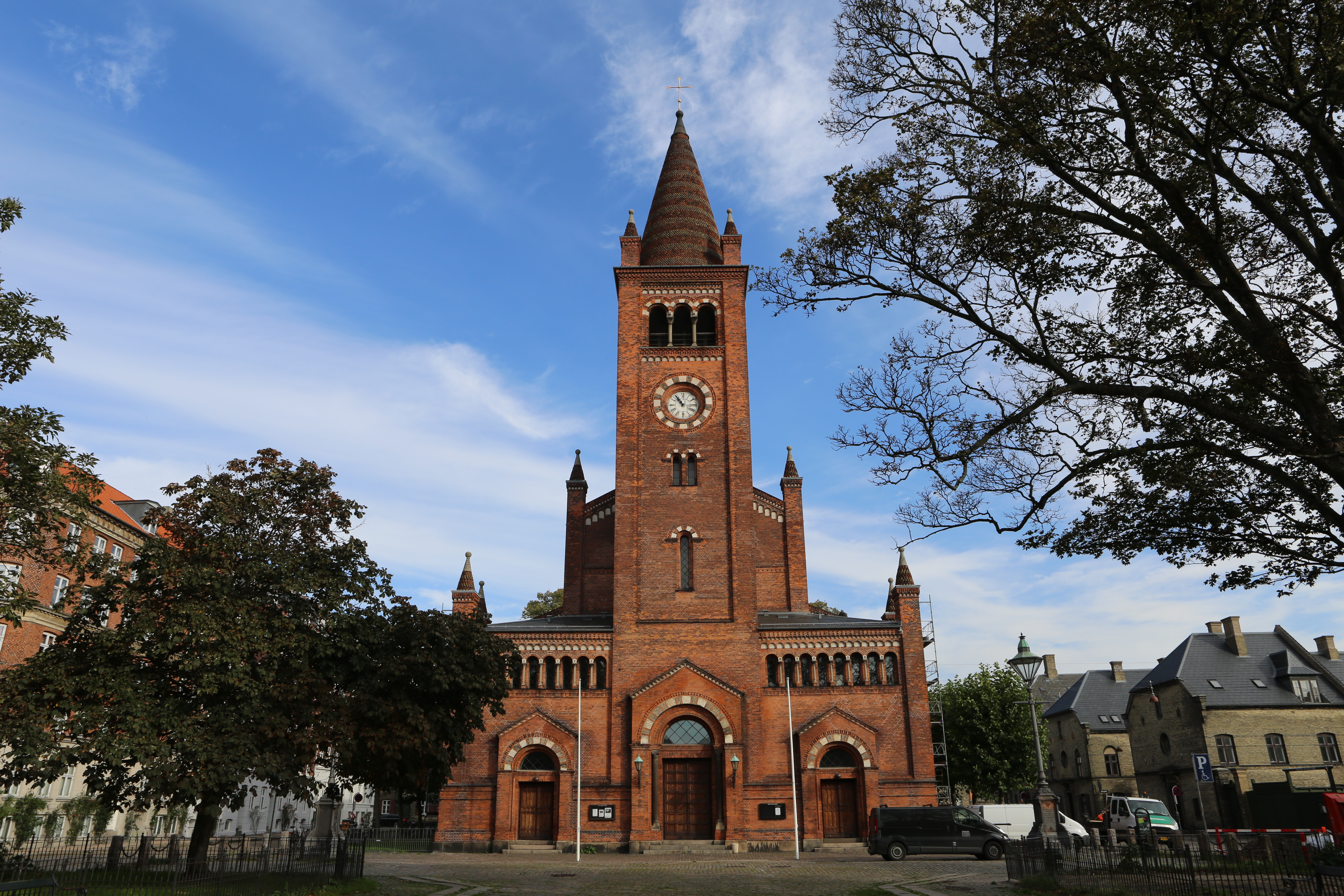
The church viewed from Adelgade

The church is built in red brick and the masonry is decorated with blinds, arches, columns and pinnacles on all corners.

== Interior ==
The church's first altarpiece was a painting by Hendrick Krock entitled The Eucharist (Danish: Nadveren). In 1887 it was replaced by a gilded crucifix created by the sculptor Jens Adolf Jerichau, a donation from pastor Christian Møller.

== Organs ==
The church has two organs. The main organ has 42 voices and 3126 pipes, three manuals and pedal. Originally built by the organ builder Daniel Köhne in 1878 with 20 voices, and rebuilt and enlarged by I. Starup & Søn in 1926 and 1938 respectively. The choir organ is built by the Dutch organ builder Henk Klop in 2000. Frederik Magle is organist since 2017.

== St. Paul's Square ==
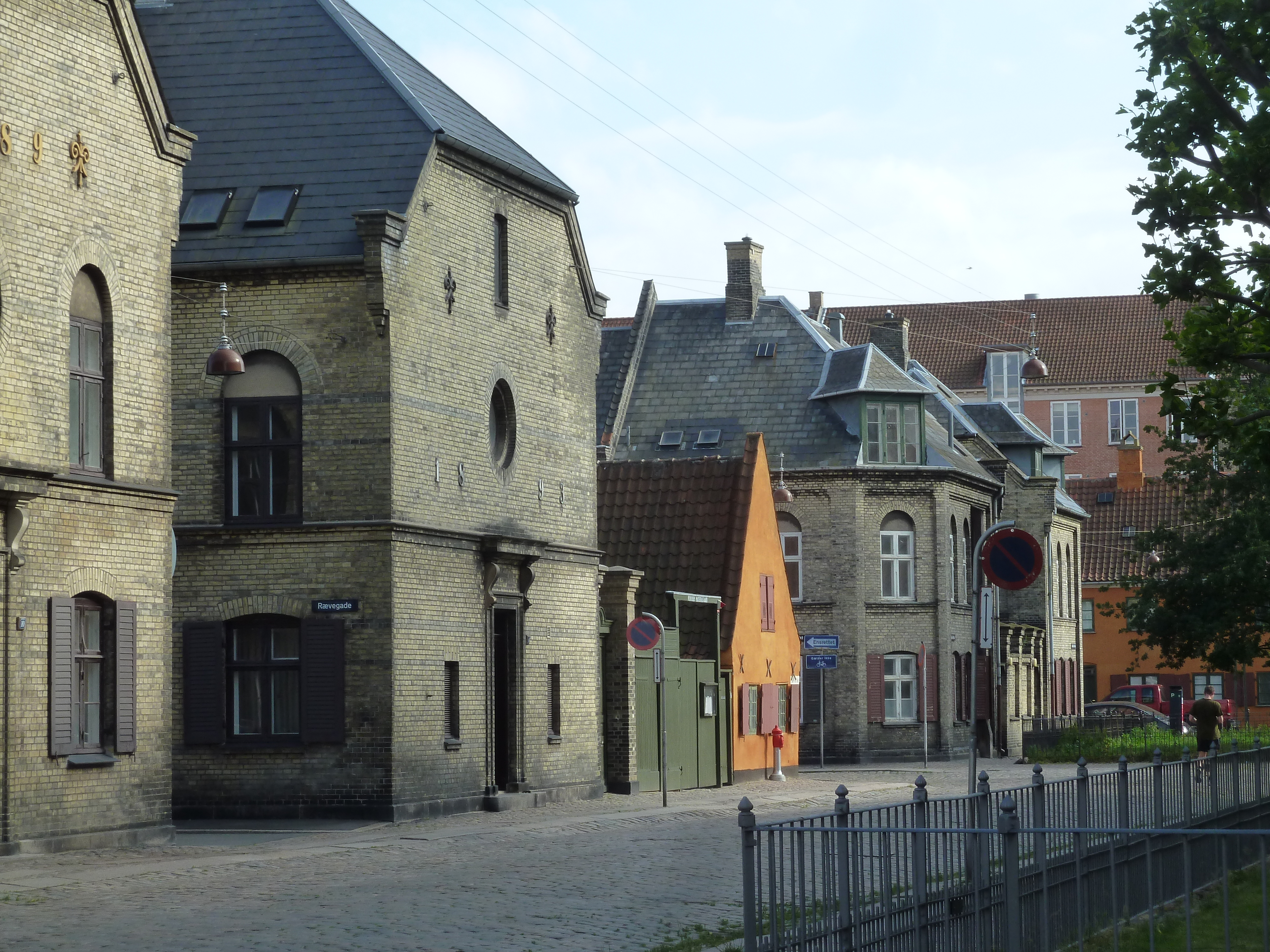
St. Paul's Square, southeast side

The space surrounding the church is called Sankt Pauls Plads (St. Paul's Square). On the southeast side of the church (even numbers) are some of the so'called Grey Tows of the Nyboder development. They were designed by Olaf Schmidth and are younger than the more well-known terraces of the neighbourhood. On the other side of the church street (even numbers) are a row of apartment buildings from the 1870s. To the rear of the church is the former Gernersgade Barracks, now Bygningskulturens Hus. Two of Nyboder's Yellow Rows flank Adelgade in front of the church.

== See also ==
- Architecture of Denmark
