= Bygningskulturens Hus =

Listed Historicist building in Copenhagen, Denmark

Coordinates: 55.6881°N 12.5882°E

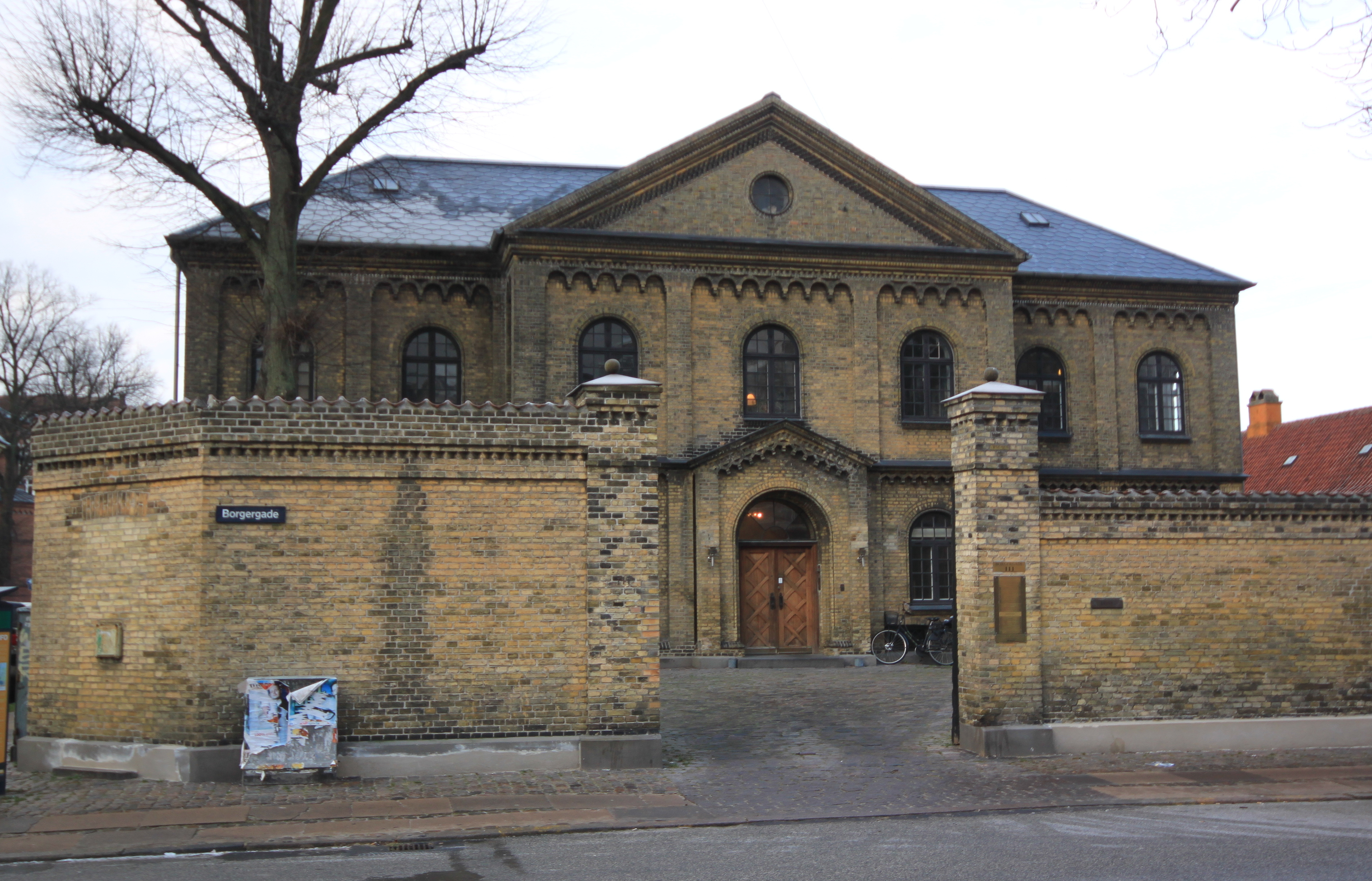
The building seen from Borgergade

Bygningskulturens Hus (English House of Architectural Heritage), the former Søetatens Pigeskole (English: The Naval Girls' School), is a listed Historicist building now serving as a centre for historic architecture and cultural heritage in Copenhagen, Denmark. It is located in Borgergade, next to Nyboder.

== History ==
Originally known as Søetatens Pigeskole (English: The Naval Girls' School), the school was founded by the Naval Ministry (Marineministeriet), to improve the education of the daughters of Navy personnel, such as sailors and craftsmen. The architect Bernhard Seidelin was charged with the design of the building, which was inaugurated in 1859. It was conveniently sited next to Nyboder but also served those from Nyholm. The school was intended for 450 girls aged from six to 14.

The school only existed for just over ten years. It was then converted into a naval cadet academy (Søetatens Kadetskole). The later Frederik IX was a student there for several years. The installation existed until shortly after World War II and was also known as Gernersgade Barracks. During the Occupation, the barracks was a target in Operation Safari, which disarmed and dissolved the Danish Army and Navy. At 4 in the morning, the gate was blown open and German soldiers stormed the building, opening machine gun fire against the doors. Two Danish soldiers were killed and five wounded.

Realea (now Realdania Byg) acquired the building in 2003. It was subsequently put through a comprehensive refurbishment which adapted it to its current use.

== Architecture ==
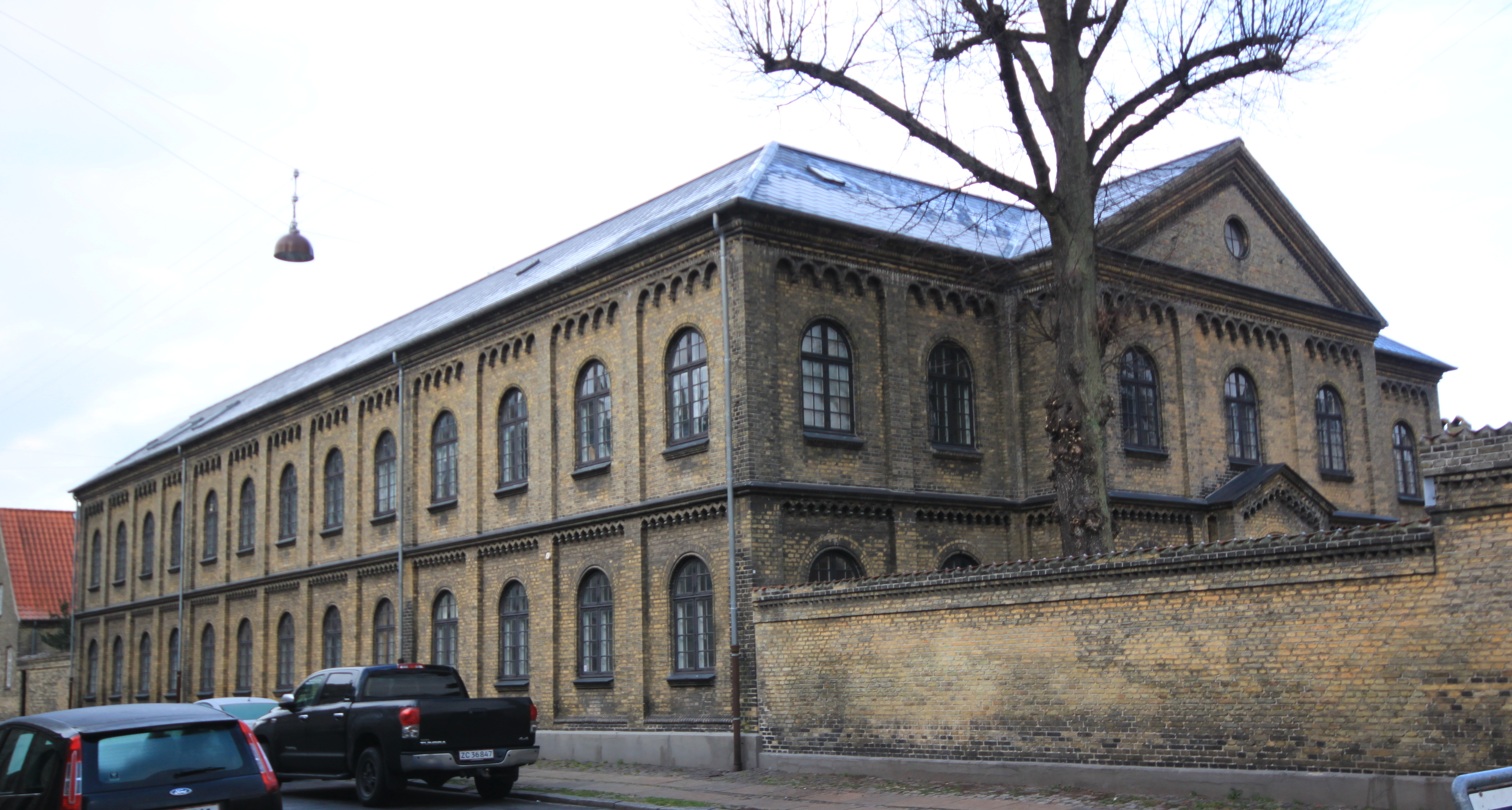
The building from Gernersgade

The Naval Girls' School is a four-wing building constructed in yellow brick to a typical Historicist design. It is decorated with lesenes and Lombard bands on all sides. The front on Borgergade is strictly symmetrical with a central projection topped by a triangular pediment. The building is pulled back from the street and surrounded by a wall in the same yellow brick. Its gate is located to the left of the main entrance, breaking with the overall symmetry of the complex, unlike what is seen in the original renders.

The building is centered on a large gym hall with an open gallery. The interior is richly decorated with wood carvings and reliefs created to designs by the sculptor Bertel Thorvaldsen.

== Activities ==
The activities include minor conferences, meetings, workshops and public lectures. A number of organisations are based in the building:

- Bygningskultur Danmark
- BYFO Bygnings Frednings Foreningen
- By & Land (Landsforeningen for Bygnings- og Landskabskultur)
- Bygherreforeningen
- Dansk Bygningsarv A/S
- Dansk Kunstnerråd

== See also ==
- Garrison Hospital, Copenhagen
- Danish Architecture Centre
