= Peter Christoph Hagemann =

Danish architect

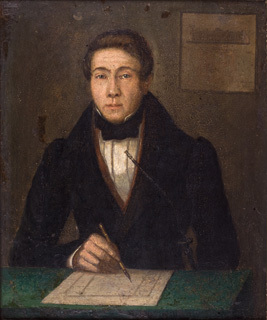
P C. Hagemann

Peter Christoph Hagemann (20 March 1810 – 22 August 1853), often referred to as P. C. Hagemann was a Neoclassical Danish architect who worked in Copenhagen.

== Early life and education ==
Hagemann was born in Itzehoe in 1810, the son of mason Johann Christoph Hagemann and his wife Catharina Lahann. He first trained as a mason before studying at the Royal Danish Academy of Fine Arts whose large silver medal he won in 1842. He won the Neuhausen Prize in 1843 and was represented at the Charlottenborg Spring Exhibition in 1839 and 1843 (with four works).

== Career ==
Hagemann soon attracted many assignments, both from the city and from private clients. He was responsible for the construction of four public primary schools in 1844–1850, including Sølvgade School and Larslejstræde School (1849–50). He was also charged with the design of a complex of market stalls for the butchers at Nikolaj Plads (1845–46), the first large iron structure in Denmark. Many of his private commissions came from the grocer H.P. Lorentzen.

== Personal life ==
Hagemann remained unmarried. He died from cholera during the 1853 Copenhagen cholera outbreak and is interred at Assistens Cemetery.

== List of works ==
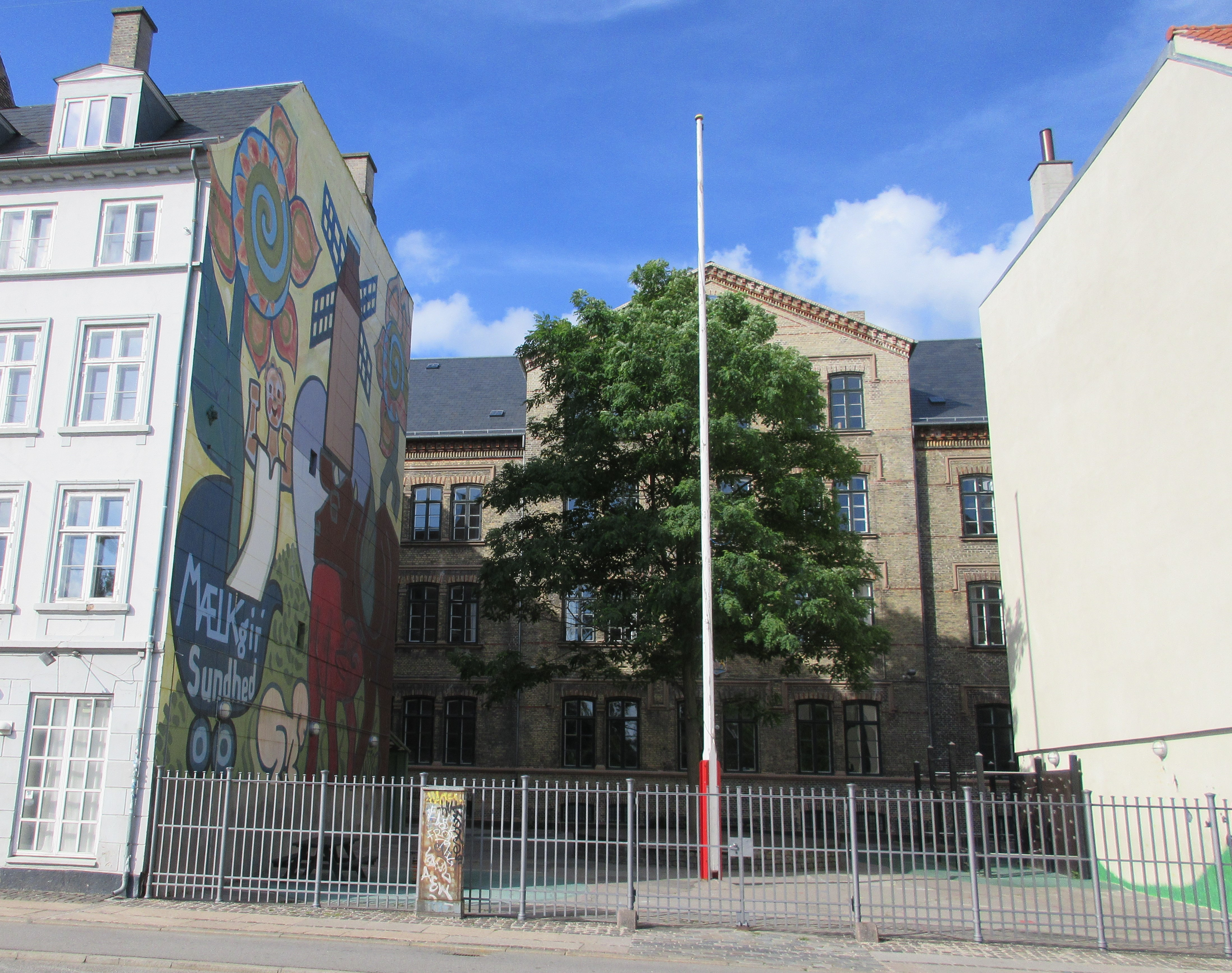
Sølvgade School

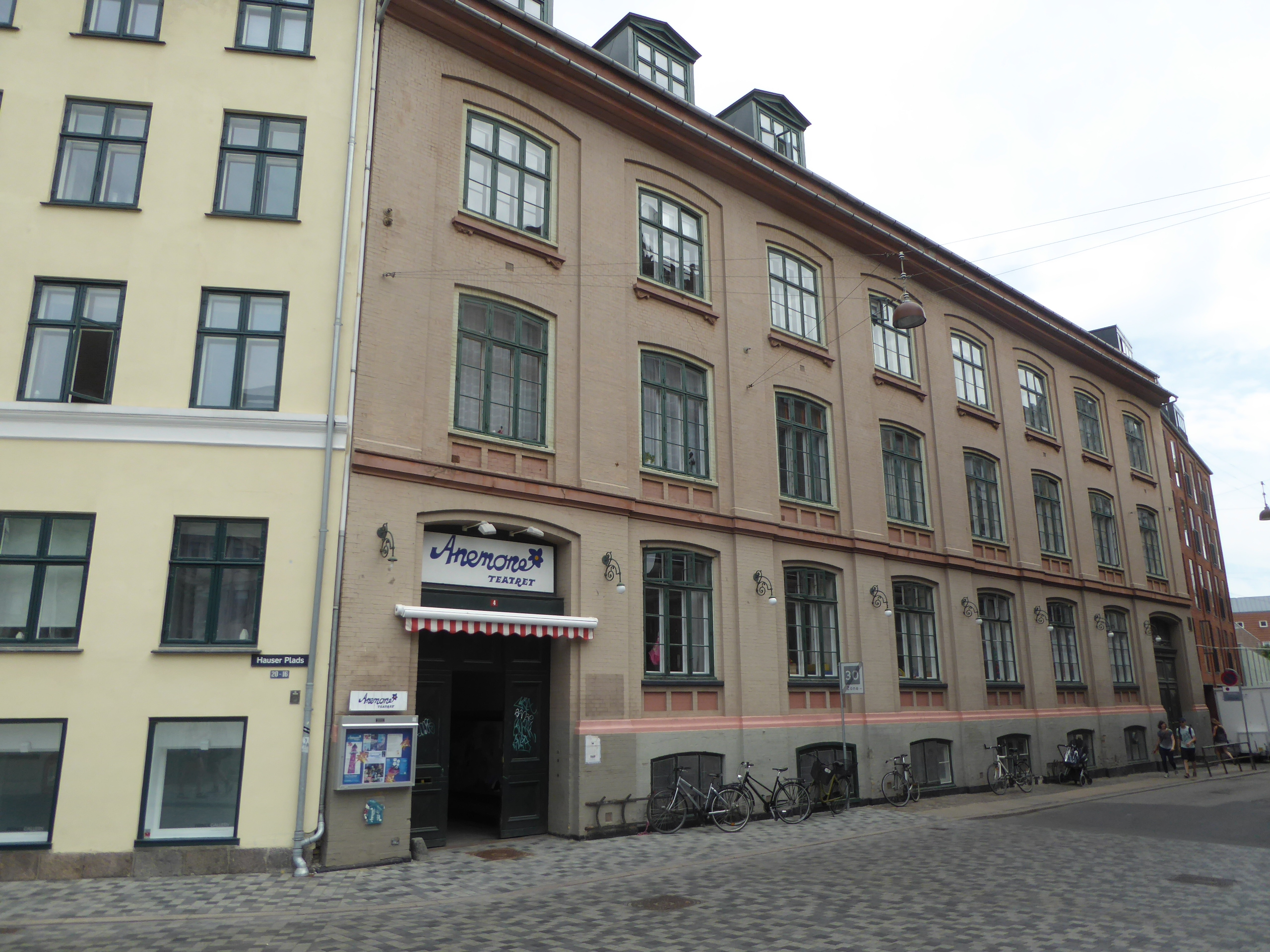
Suhmsgade School

- Market building, Nikolaj Plads (1846, demolished)
- Sølvgade School, Sølvgade (1846–47, listed)
- Nikolaj Plads 7-13 (1848–49, fredet)
- Nørrevold School, Nørre Voldgade 28 (1849–50, formerly Den forenede Friskole and Larslejstrædes Skole)
- Helsingør Skydebanes hovedbygning (1849–50, altered)
- Sankt Annæ Plads 1-3 (1850, taken over from G.F. Hetsch, fredet)
- Sankt Hans Gades School, Sankt Hans Gade 27 (1851, altered by Theodor Sørensen in 1862)
- Vingårdstræde 18-20 (1851, listed)
- Suhmsgade School, Suhmsgade 4 (1851–52, formerly Vestre Betalingsskole)
- Niels Simonsen House, Gammel Kongevej 117 (1852, demolished)
- Nikolaj Plads 5 (1853–54, completed after his death)
- Vesterbro Pharmacy, Vesterbrogade 72 (1853–54, completed by P.C. Bønecke, listed)
- Borgergade 140 and 144 (1854, to Hagemann's designtegninger, listed)
- Sankt Pauls Gade 8-12 (1854–57, Hagemann's design)
