= Nyboder =

Historic row house district of former Naval barracks in Copenhagen, Denmark

Coordinates: 55.6889°N 12.5875°E

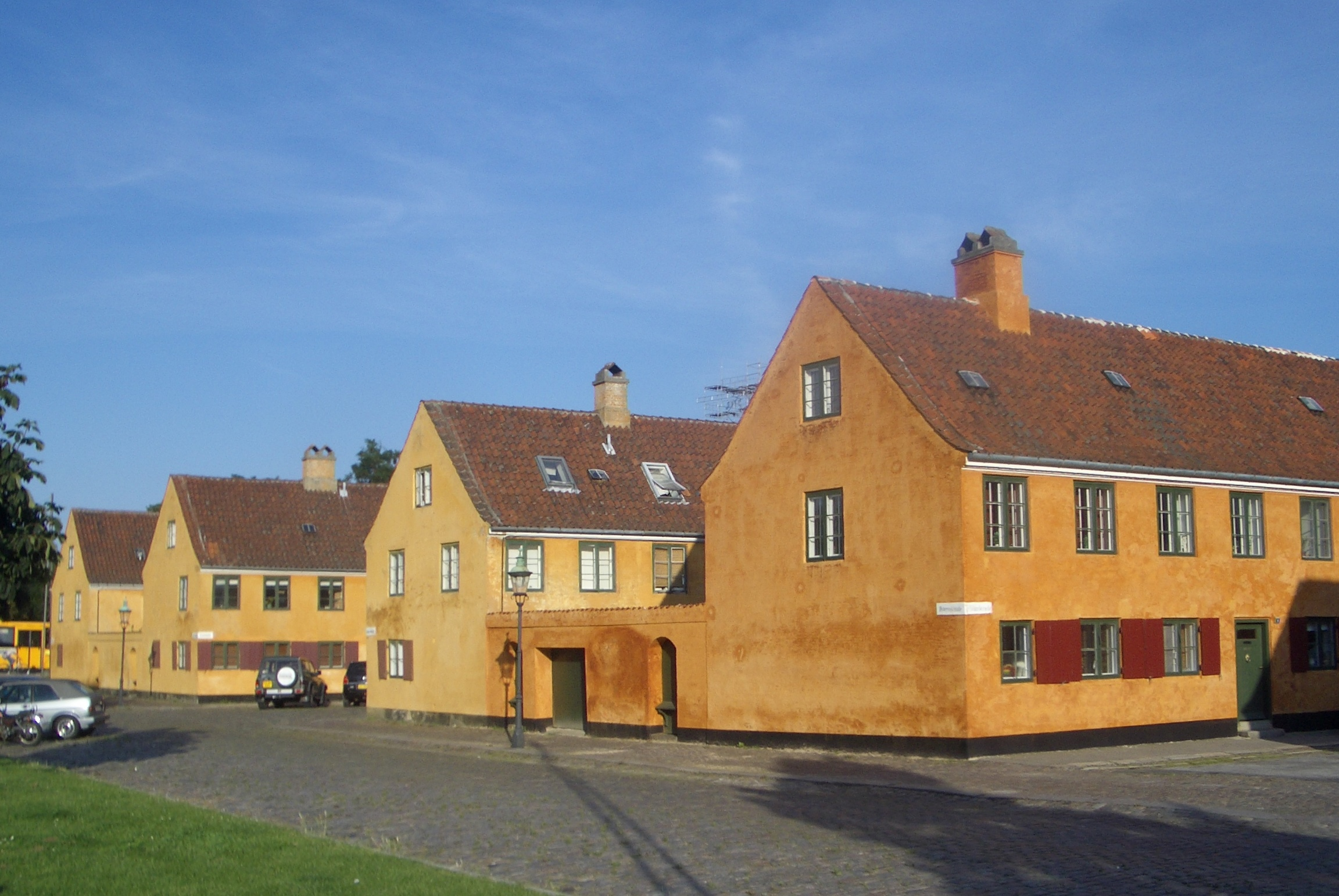
- Interactive map of the Nyboder area

General information
- Location: Copenhagen, Denmark
- Construction started: 1631 (1st stage)
- Completed: 1795 (2nd stage)
- Client: Christian IV

Design and construction
- Architects: Hans van Steenwinckel the Younger; Philip de Lange

Nyboder (English: New [small] Houses) is a historic row house district of former Naval barracks in Copenhagen, Denmark. It was planned and first built by Christian IV to accommodate a need for housing for the personnel of the rapidly growing Royal Danish Navy and their families during that time. While the area is still commonly associated with the name of its founder as one of his numerous building projects around Copenhagen, the Nyboder seen today was in fact, except for a single row of houses in Sankt Pauls Gade, built from 1757.

Nyboder is today very much associated with their yellow colour and "Nyboder yellow" is in Danish often used as a generic term to refer to their exact hue of yellow. However, the original colour of the development was red and white.

== History ==
=== Christian IV's Nyboder ===
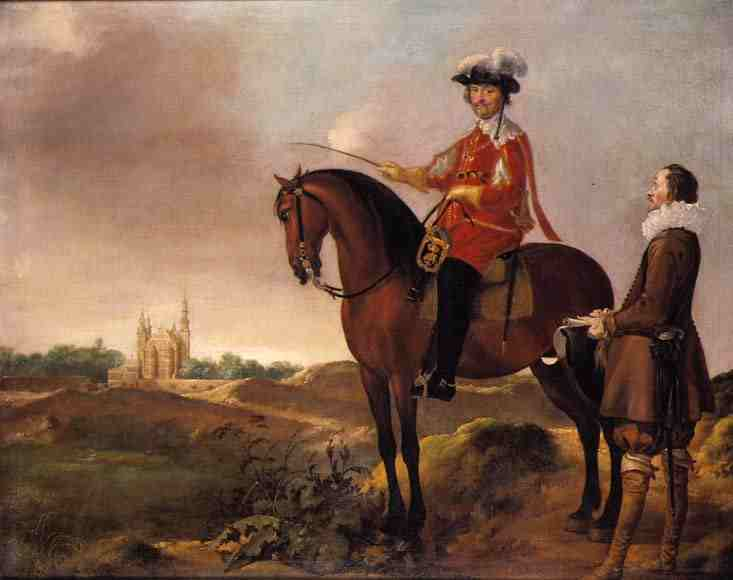
King Christian IV and Hans van Steenwinckel the Younger painted together 1638 with Rosenborg Castle in the background, not far from their Nyboder development

Under Christian IV the Royal Danish Navy grew rapidly and there was an urgent need for suitable accommodation for its personnel and their families. Bremerholm already offered similar housing for naval officers, these were the old houses referred to by implication in Nyboder's name, so now the new barracks were to house common sailors and other private personnel. The new development was planned on land outside Copenhagen previously acquired by the king with the intention to expand the fortified city northwards. This had still not happened but Saint Anne's Post, later to develop into Kastellet, had already been constructed a little further north.

Plan of Nyboder (north is right)

Construction of Nyboder was commenced in 1631. The area was laid out around two main streets radiating from a planned square which was never established. The rows were oriented perpendicularly to these streets. The architects assisting the King were Hans van Steenwinckel the Younger and later Leonhard Blasius. Christian IV's Nyboder was completed around 1641.

=== Absorption by the city ===
In 1647, one year before Christian IV's death, Nyboder was definitively absorbed by the fortified city when the Eastern City Gate was moved, yet much of its surroundings still awaited redevelopment. Just north of Nyboder lay a piece of undeveloped land known as Greenland (Danish: Grønland).

On 16 December 1658 a gunpowder magazine just north of Nyboder exploded, damaging or demolishing many houses and causing numerous casualties.

In 1668 Copenhagen's gallows were moved from its previous location, at the site where Kongens Nytorv would be laid out a few years later, to Greenland. In 1677, Nyboder saw another bleak neighbour when the Stocks House was built a little to the south.

=== Guard and jailhouse ===
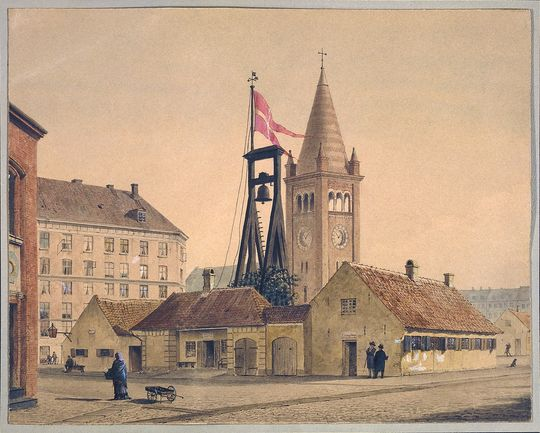
Painting from 1880 showing the guardhouse with the bell and St. Paul's, visible in the background. Today the view of the church is obstructed by buildings

From its early days, the Nyboder area included a guardhouse which was replaced by a new building in the 1780s. It had an external bell which was used to gather people in the event of a military attack or fire. The building also houses the Nyboder barracks' own guard and contained a jail, where trouble-making residents were deposited.

=== Expansion of the Nyboder ===
In 1695 a commission considered a proposal to move some of the naval personnel to the island of Møn, due to lack of space in the crowded city which was still not allowed to develop beyond its fortifications but it never happened. When the Frederiksholm islet was created by a series of land reclamations the intention was to use it for new naval barracks but again the plans were not carried out.

In the end it was decided to build new houses at Nyboder and the expansion would continue for the next 40 years. In 1756 24 two-storey houses designed by Philip de Lange were built and while later extensions would be directed by other architects, it continued to be to his initial design. In 1771 some of Christian IV's original rows were extended with an extra storey by Anthon and Harsdorff. From 1781-96 another app. 150 houses were built. A guard house (1787) and five officer's houses were also added to the area during the same period.

Between 1853 and 1878 half of Nyboder was sold off and demolished.

== Nyboder today ==
Nyboder still houses personnel of the Danish Navy, Army and Air Force, and priority is given to service members stationed in Copenhagen.

It has several times been proposed to sell the houses and use the proceeds for various purposes, including investments in improved infrastructure in Copenhagen, but so far it has been rejected. In 2009 the A. P. Møller Foundation made a donation of DKK 50 million for a refurbishment of some of the houses.

== Nyboder's Church ==
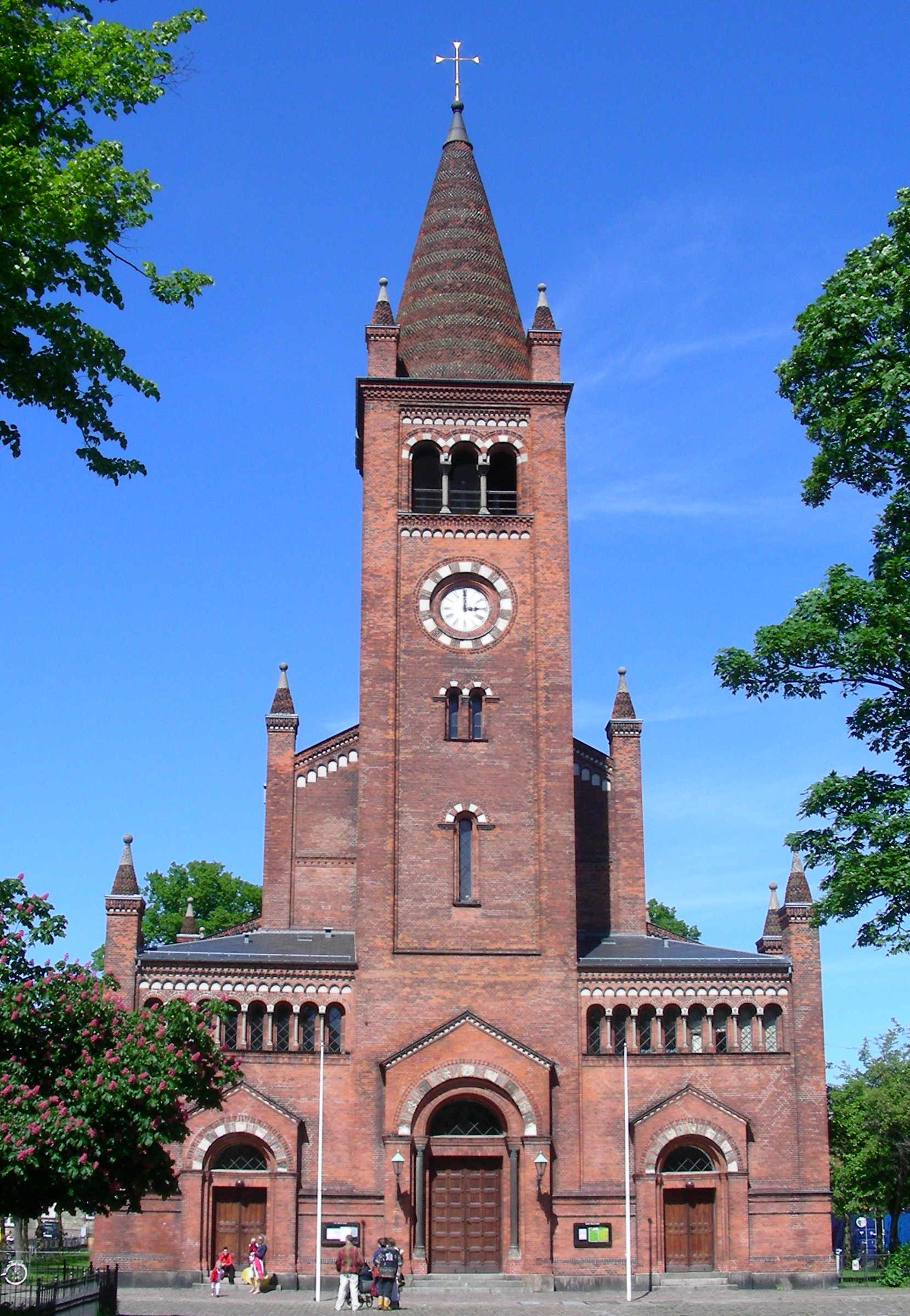
St. Paul's Church

From 1872 to 1877 St. Paul's Church was built to the design of Johannes Emil Gnudtzmann in the middle of the Nyboder area and it is often referred to as Nyboder's Church. It is built in red brick and the masonry is decorated with blinds, arches, columns. and pinnacles on all corners.

== Nyboder's school ==
Nyboder School is located at 15 Øster Voldgade.

== Monuments ==
=== Edouard Suenson Memorial ===
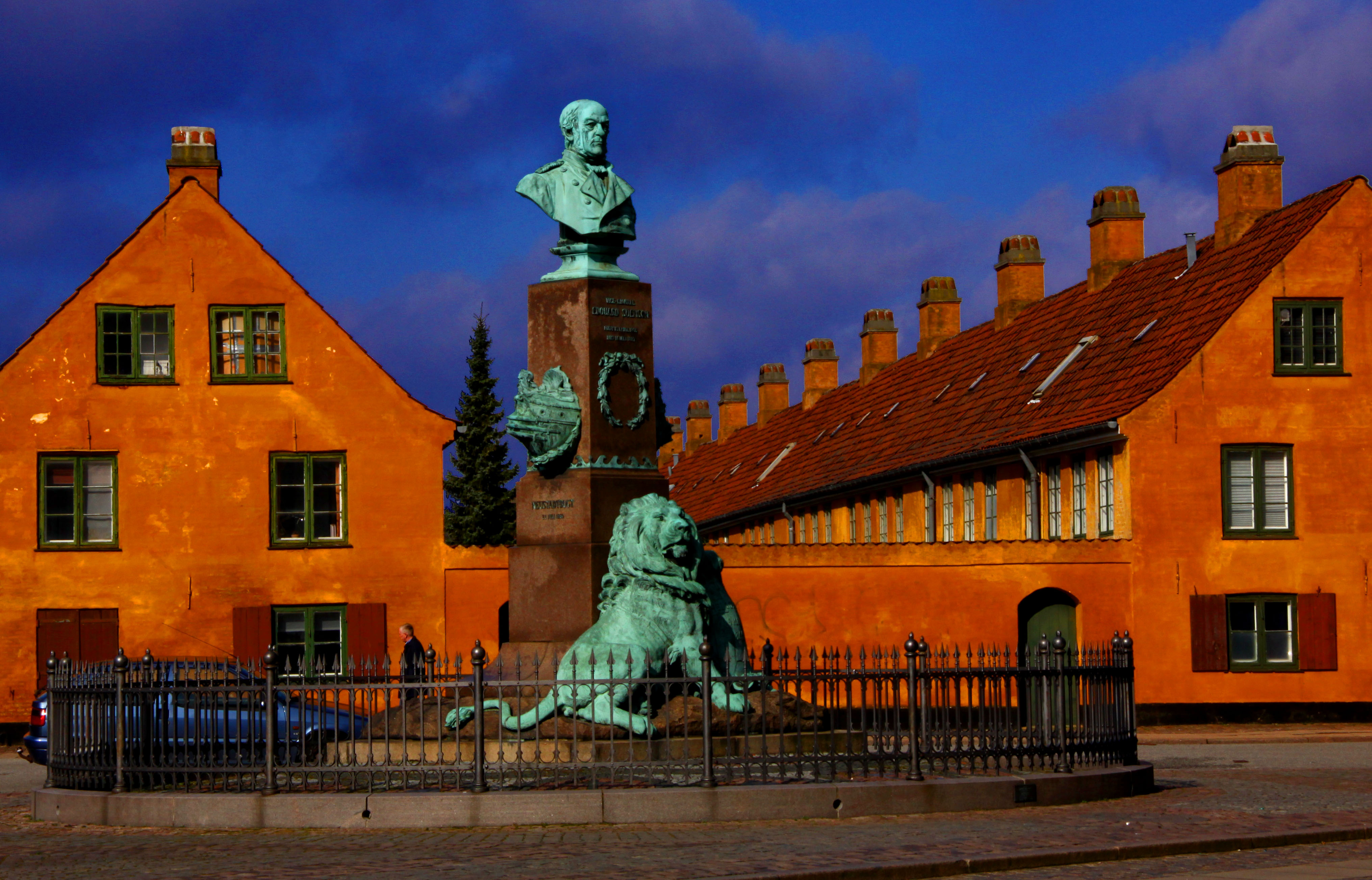
The Edouard Suenson Memorial

At Store Kongensgade, in front of Nyboder, there is a memorial to Vice Admiral Edouard Suenson who commanded the Danish ships in the Battle of Heligoland 9 May 1864. The monument was designed by Theobald Stein and inaugurated on 9 May 1889.

The monument consists of a bust of Suenson mounted on a high plinth decorated with a laurel wreath and prows. On its front side, it has the inscription: "VICE-ADMIRAL/EDOUARD SUENSON/Vorn 13 APRIL 1805/DIED 16 MAY 1887 The foot of the plinth is guarded by bronze lions which hold a coat of arms with the inscription "HELGOLAND/9 MAY/1864".

=== Christian IV statue ===
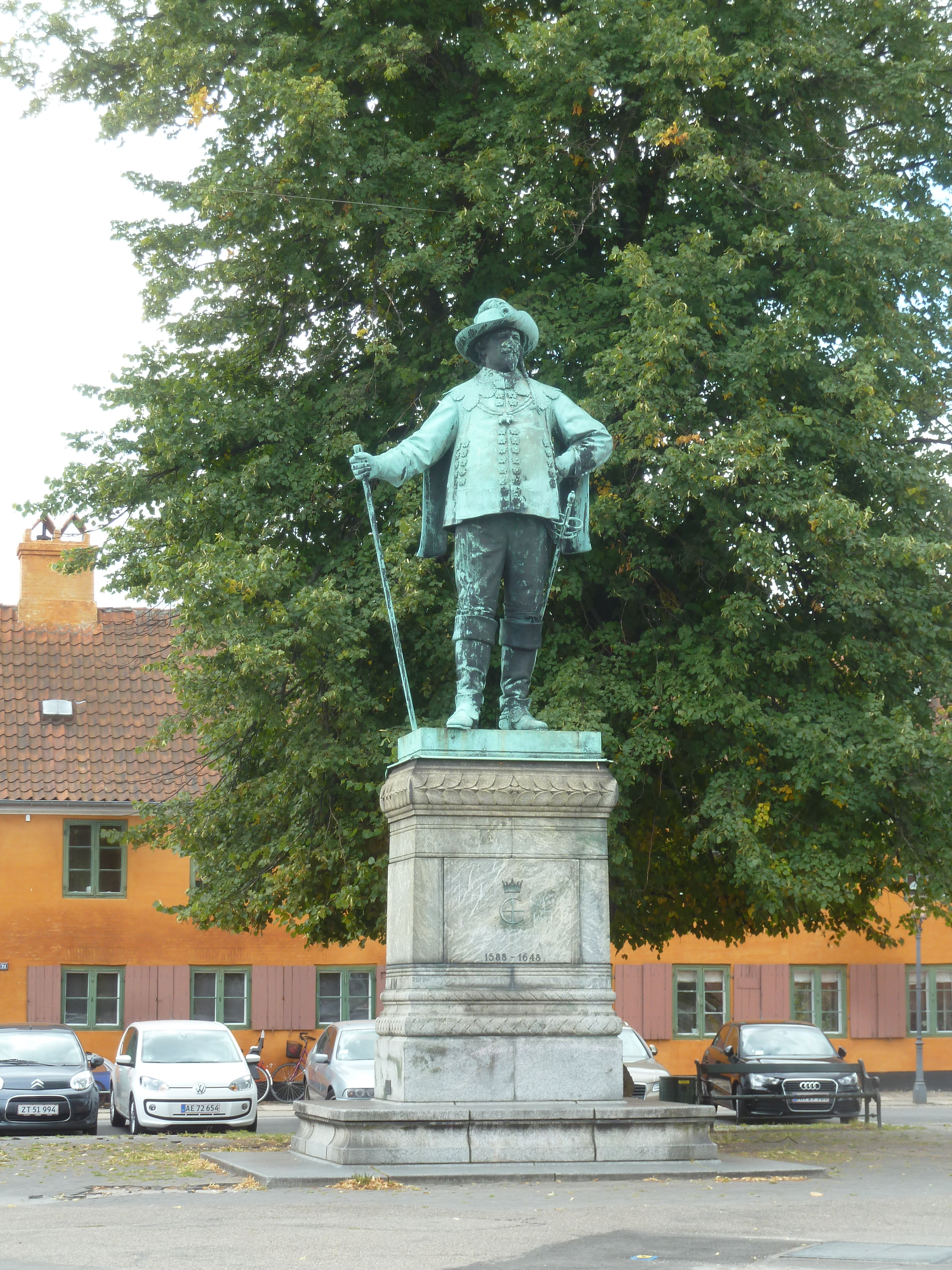
Statue of Christian IV at Nyboder.

On the corner of Kronprinsessegade and Øster Voldgade, there is a bronze statue of Christian IV, the founder of the area, standing on a granite plinth. The statue was designed by Vilhelm Bissen and inaugurated in 1900.

== Cultural references ==
- In Either/Or, existentialist Danish philosopher Søren Kierkegaard asks rhetorically: "Why was I not born in Nyboder, why did I not die as a baby?".
- In Kierkegaard's Diary of a seducer, the protagonist describes the female inhabitants of the area: "And now comes the select troops—the Nyboder girls, less tall, well rounded and filled out, delicate in complexion, merry, happy, quick, talkative, a bit coquettish, and, above all, bareheaded.".
- In Hans Christian Andersen's fairy tale The Elder-Tree Mother, an old man tells a sick boy a story which opens "A great blooming tree just exactly like that stands in Nyboder. It grows in the corner of a poor little yard; and under that tree two old people sat one afternoon in the bright sunshine. It was an old sailor and his very old wife...". Elder trees were abundant in the area around Nyboder which gave rise to some superstition, compare the Elder Mother.
- In his play Den Stundesløse, Ludvig Holberg mocks the tendency to get married young and have many children in Nyboder.
- In the Nobel Prize-winning Danish author Henrik Pontoppidan's partly autobiographical novel Lykke-Per, the protagonist rents a room from a boatsman in the street Hjertensfrydsgade in Nyboder.
- Danish jazz musician Papa Bue and his Viking Jazz Band have both made tracks called Praise of Nyboder (1959) and Nyboder's Pride.
- In the 2015 drama film The Danish Girl, Lili Elbe (Eddie Redmayne) visits a male friend at Suensonsgade 8 in Nyboder.
