= Johannes Emil Gnudtzmann =

Danish architect

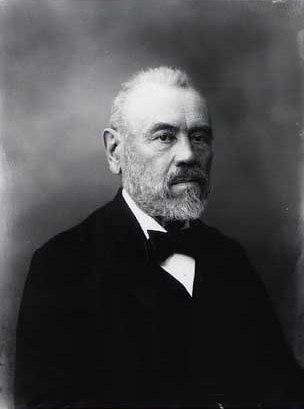
- Born: 17 November 1837; Copenhagen, Denmark
- Died: 14 April 1922 (aged 84); Copenhagen, Denmark
- Occupation: Architect
- Buildings: St. Paul's Church; Royal Veterinary and Agricultural University

Johannes Emil Gnudtzmann (17 November 1837 – 14 April 1922) was a Danish architect working in the Historicist style. His most notable works are St. Paul's Church and the extension of the Royal Veterinary and Agricultural University's main building, both in Copenhagen. He was the father of Kaj Gnudtzmann.

== Biography ==
=== Early life and education ===
Gnudtzmann was born on 17 November 1837 in Copenhagen. He studied architecture at the Royal Danish Academy of Fine Arts from 1859 to 1866 and at the College of Advanced Technology from 1862 to 1865, graduating from both institutions. At the Technical College, where he remained the only student ever to take the exam as an architect, he studied under Johan Daniel Herholdt and after his graduation became his assistant, working mainly on the Danish National Bank at Holmens Kanal. He also worked for Christian Hansen who had returned to Denmark in 1851 after many years in Athens. In 1871 he won a scholarship from the Academy and travelled to Germany, Austria and Italy where he was particularly struck by North Italian brick architecture.

=== Career ===
Gnudtzmann's first independent work was St. Paul's Church at Nyboder in Copenhagen. He only won the second prize in a competition in 1869 but in the end his project was selected and built from 1872 to 1877. His later works mainly included churches, schools and residential buildings.

From 1892 to 1895, he carried out extensions of the Royal Veterinary and Agricultural University's main building, which had originally been designed by Michael Gottlieb Bindesbøll.

In parallel to his practical work, Gnudtzmann worked at the Technical College from 1876 to 1909, first as Herholdt's assistant and later as his successor, and then became a titular professor at the Academy. He also sat on a number of public boards and committees.

== Selected works ==
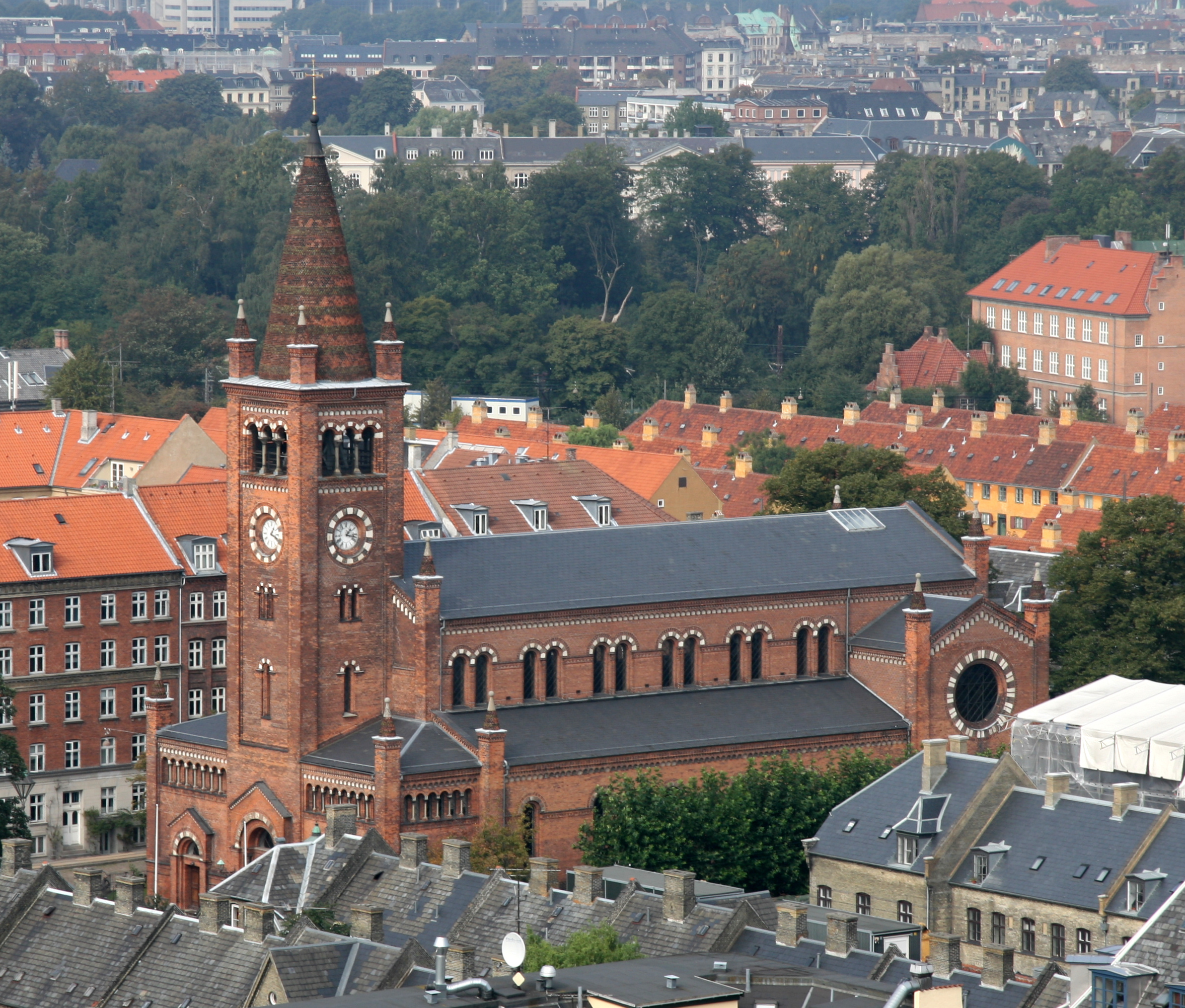
St. Paul's Church, Copenhagen (1877)

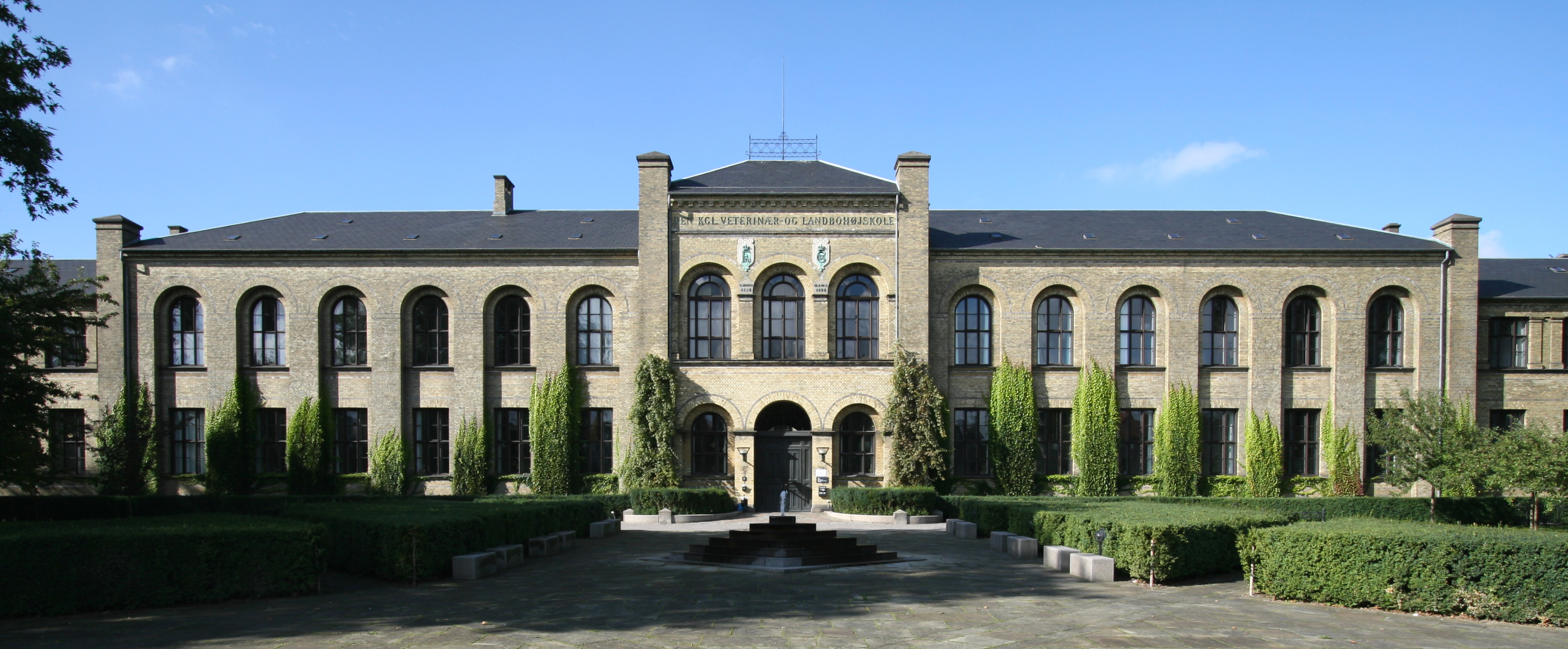
Royal Veterinary and Agricultural College, Copenhagen (1895)

- St. Paul's Church, Copenhagen (1872–77)
- Church of Our Lady, Aalborg (1877–78)
- 3 Colbjørnsensgade (residential building), Copenhagen (1880)
- Øster Hassin Church, Aalborg (1880)
- 3 Absalonsgade (residential building), Copenhagen (1880)
- Various buildings, Helsingør Shipyard, Helsingør (1880s)
- Warehouse, Fredericiagade, Copenhagen (1882)
- 38 Vesterbrogade, Copenhagen (1882)
- Hotel Korsør, Korsør (1882)
- Marie Kruses School, 16 Frederiksberg Allé, Frederiksberg (1886)
- Royal Veterinary and Agricultural University (extension and adaption), Frederiksberg, Copenhagen (1892–95)
- Vejle Latin School, Vejle (1893–94)
- Helsingør Latin School, Helsingør (1897)
- Various buildings, Øresunds Hospital, Helsingør (1900)
- Technical School, Helsingør (1901)
- College of Advanced Technology, Øster Farimagsgade, København (1904–06)
- Eoedemy Building, Øresunds Hospital, Helsingør (1906)
- Helsingør Tinghus, Slagtetorvet (1907)
