= Lauritz Rasmussen =

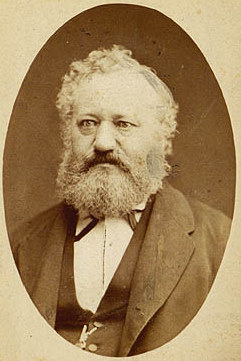
- Photograph of Lauritz Rasmussen by Emil Rye
- Born: 11 June 1824; Copenhagen, Denmark
- Died: 24 April 1893 (aged 68); Copenhagen, Denmark
- Occupation: Foundry owner

Lauritz Godtfred Rasmussen (11 June 1824 – 24 April 1893) was a Danish zinc and bronze caster. He established a zinc and bronze foundry in his own name in Copenhagen in 1865 and was appointed royal court caster in 1883. Many Danish monuments from the second half of the 19th century come from his foundry. It was later taken over by his son Carl Rasmussen and remained in the family for several generations.

== Early life and education ==
Rasmussen was born on 11 June 1824 in Copenhagen, the son of shopkeeper Niels Rasmussen (1787–1854) and Ane Nielsdatter (1784–1863). In 1839 he became a brazier's apprentice under court brazier H. Dalhoff, a brother of J. B. Dalhoff. He completed his apprenticeship in 1844 and then the following year, together with a couple of friends, went abroad to practice his trade. He initially travelled to Berlin by way of Stettin and then continued to Warsaw. From there he continued alone to Meissen, Munich, Milan and Constantinople. In Munich he took part in the casting of Ludwig Michael Schwanthaler's monumental Bavaria statue. Rasmussen was awarded the title of royal court caster in 1883 and his foundry was listed as Purveyor to the Court of Denmark.

== Career ==
After eight years as a journeyman in Europe, Rasmussen finally returned to Copenhagen in 1852 where he established a small business as a font caster in his father's basement.

After his father's death in 1854, Rasmussen established a zinc and bronze foundry at Åbenrå 22. Rasmussen's technical skill was soon noticed by Gustav Friedrich Hetsch. In 1859 the foundry relocated to larger premises at Sankt Annæ Gade 34 in Christianshavn and eight years later to Læssøesgade 14 in Nørrebro.

== Other pursuits ==
From 1875 Rasmussen was a member of Industriforeningen's board of representatives. In 1883 he became the president of the board of representatives of Kreditforeningen af Haandværkere og Industridrivende. He also served as vice chairman of Foreningen til lærlinges uddannelse.

== Personal life ==
Rasmussen married Auguste Emilie Rost (25 January 1829 – 15 May 1885) on 30 April 1855 in Meissen. She was the daughter of vineyard-owner and innkeeper Johann Karl Gottlob Rost (died 1833) and Christiane Friederike Götzin.

== Legacy ==
=== Later history of the company ===
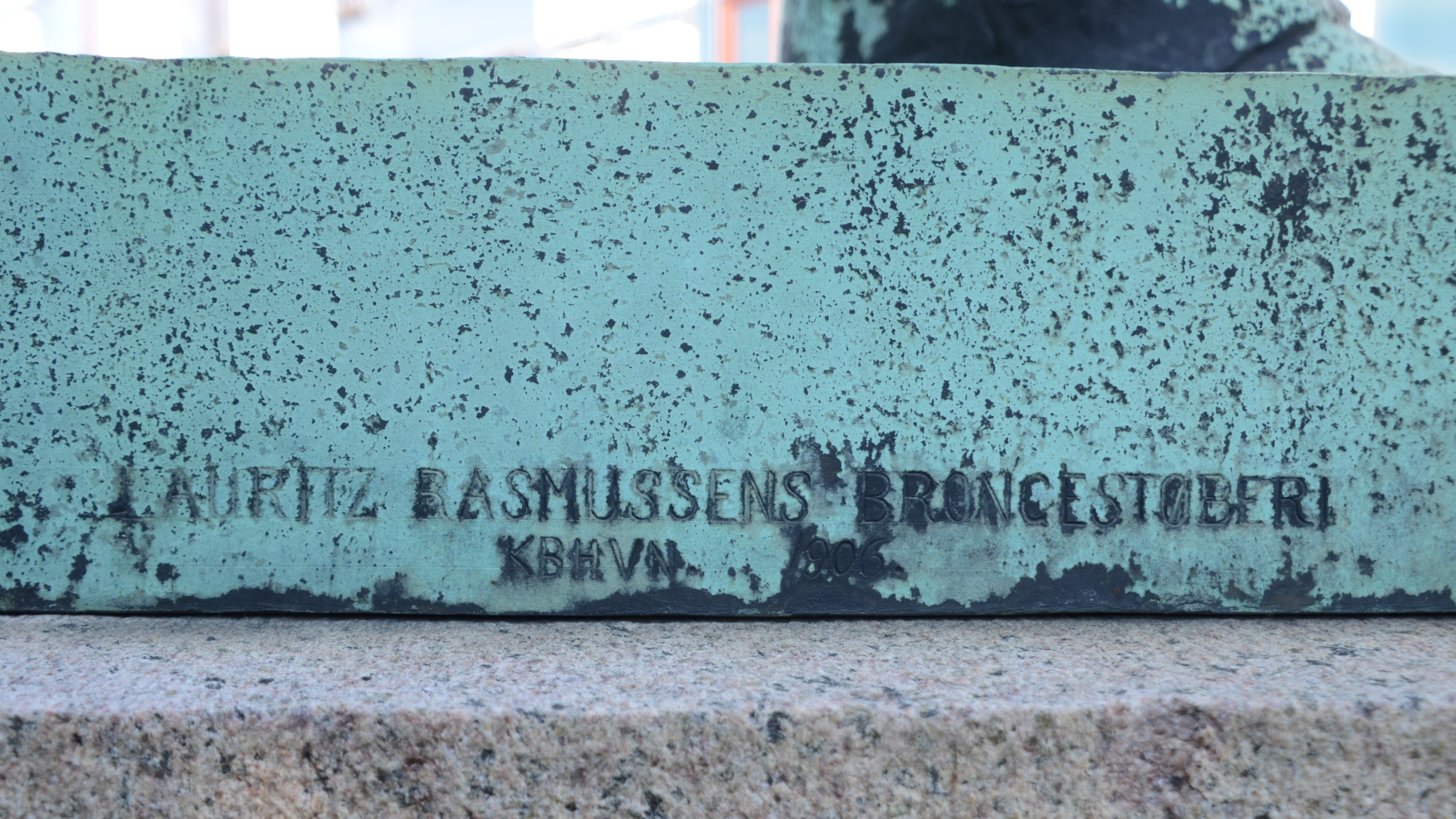
Company name on the statue of C. Berg in Kolding

Rasmussen's foundry was taken over by his son Carl Rasmussen (1863–1936) and Herman Rasmussen. They moved the foundry to larger premises at Rådmandsgade 16 in 1897. Herman Rasmussen left the company in 1900. Carl Rasmussen's son Poul Lauritz Rasmussen (1897–1980) became a partner in the company in 1920 and its sole owner after his father's death in 1936. His son H. Lauritz Rasmussen (born 1921) became a partner in the company in 1945. The company closed in 1967.

=== Works ===
Bronze

- Statue of Frederik VII (Herman Wilhelm Bissen), Odense and Køge
- Tyge Brahe (Herman Wilhelm Bissen), Østervold Observatory, Copenhagen (1876)
- Statue of Peter Jansen Wessel Tordenskiold, Church of Holmen, Copenhagen (1878)
- Bust of Vice Admiral Suenson (Theobald Stein, Nyboder (1889)
- Statue of Carl Christian Hall (Vilhelm Bissen), Søndermarken, Copenhagen (1890)
- Seven of the statues for Frederick's Church

Zinc

- Jerichau's Lions, Lion Gate, Nordre Toldbod, Copenhagen
- Mercury and Neptume, Grønningen Gate, Nordre Toldbod, Copenhagen
- Blind children (P.S.Daniel), Royal Institute for the Blind (1858)
- Moderkærligheden (Theobald Stein), Frederiksberg Åndsvageanstalt (1860)
- Apollo med Melpomene og Thalia – sammen med Pegasus, Hippokrenes Kilde, (Ring), Royal Danish Theatre (1878)
- Minerva, der værger Børnene mod Pestgudens Pile (Vilhelm Bissen, Blegdamsvej Hospital)
- Fountain, Industriudstilling i Industriforeningen, later moved to Horsens (1872)
