= Edouard Suenson =

Danish vice admiral (1805–1887)

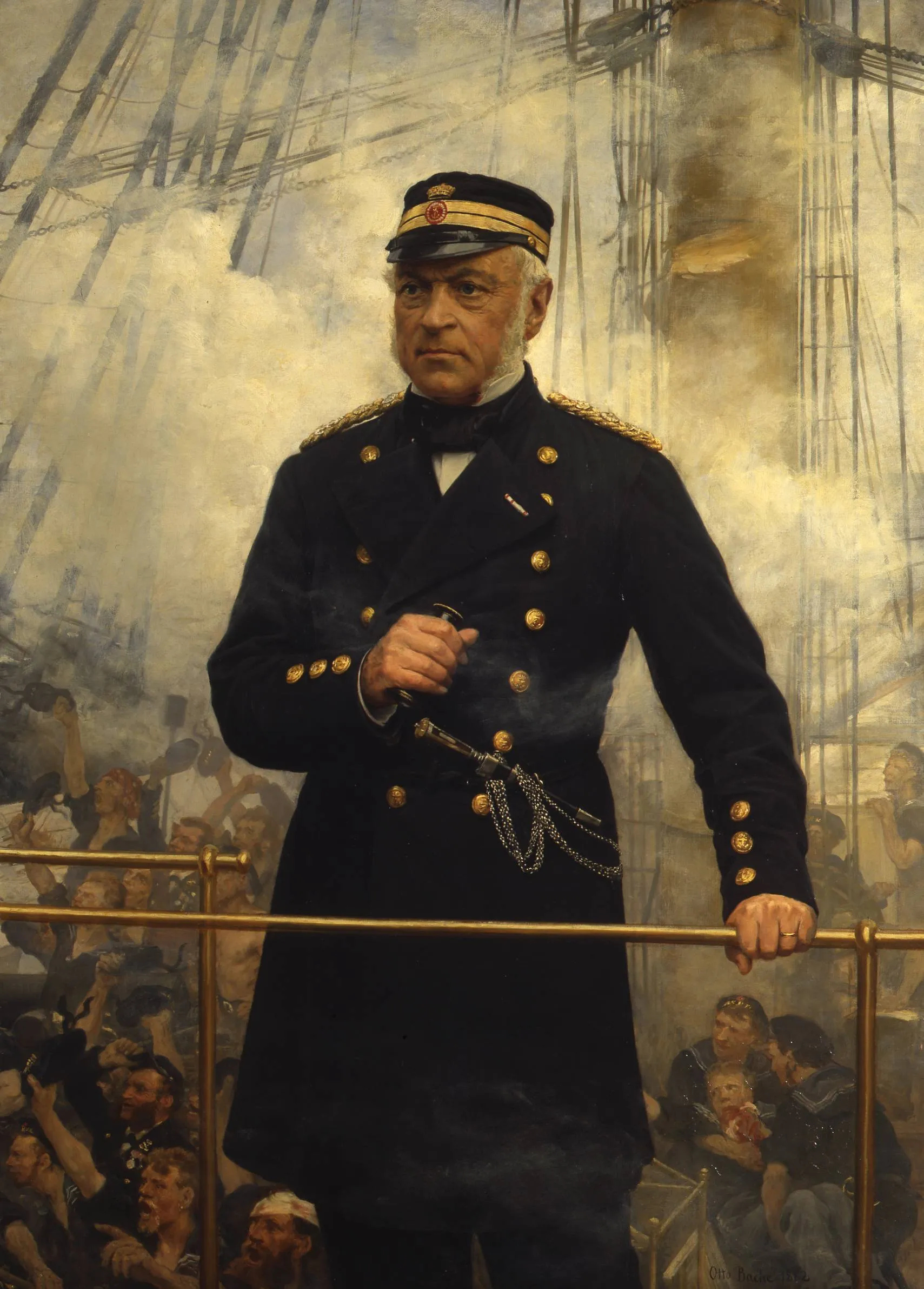
- Born: 13 April 1805; Copenhagen, Denmark-Norway
- Died: 16 May 1887 (aged 82); Copenhagen, Denmark
- Burial place: Holmen Cemetery, Østerbro, Copenhagen, Denmark
- Military career
- Allegiance: Denmark; Kingdom of France; July Monarchy
- Branch: Royal Danish Navy
- Service years: 1817–1880
- Rank: Vice-Admiral
- Conflicts: Greek War of Independence; Battle of Navarino; French Conquest of Algeria; Invasion of Algiers in 1830; First Schleswig War; Second Schleswig War; Battle of Heligoland

Vice-Admiral Edouard Suenson (13 April 1805 – 16 May 1887) was a Danish naval officer known for his participation in the First and Second Schleswig War. He served as the main Danish commander at the Battle of Heligoland in the latter.

== Biography ==
=== Family ===
Edouard Suenson was the son of Captain Jean Isaac Suenson and Anna Susanne née Lütken. He married Ottilia Uldall, daughter of chamberlain Johan Joachim Uldall and Anna Christiane Nellemann, in Copenhagen on 11 September 1837. Their son Edouard Suenson Jr. would also become a naval officer. He also served as managing director of the Great Northern Telegraph Company.

=== Military career ===
He entered military service in 1817 as a cadet and was promoted to lieutenant on 14 September 1823. Around 1825, he sailed for the Danish West Indies on the corvette Diana, and was granted admission to serve in the French Royal Navy. He was aboard the brig Alcyone when the combined British-French-Russian fleet destroyed the Ottoman navy at the Battle of Navarino. He later served on board the frigate Thetis during the Invasion of Algiers in 1830 from 1830 to 1831 under Admiral Guy-Victor Duperré. In autumn of 1831, he returned home from French service and later sailed with the brig St. Jan to the Danish West Indies. He was then promoted to First Lieutenant at Sea. In 1840, he was given command of the steamship Kiel and was promoted to Lieutenant Commander on 13 February 1841. From 1840 to 1841, he sailed with the frigate Bellona to the east and west coast of South America. From 1842 to 1844, he was in command of the steamship ÆgirIn. In 1846, he sailed as commander with the brig St. Croix to Iceland, and in 1847 became commander of the Trekroner Fort.

=== First Schleswig War ===
In 1848, the First Schleswig War broke out when Suenson was commander of the schooner Pilen, a guard ship near Nyborg in the Great Belt. In 1849, he became commander of the corvette Diana, a guard ship near Helsingør. In 1850, he became commander of the steamship Hekla in the Baltic Sea Squadron. In the bay of Neustadt, there was a battle with the steam cannon boat Von der Tann on 20 and 21 July 1850, during which the Von der Tann ran aground and was abandoned by its crew and set on fire. The ship was later repaired and incorporated into the Danish fleet under the name Støren.

On 16 August 1850, Edouard Suenson led a battle between the Danish ships Hekla and Løwe with four Schleswig-Holstein gunboats in the Bay of Kiel.

=== Interwar Period ===
In 1851, he became a member of the Construction and Regulatory Commission after the war. In May 1851, he became commander of the Naval Cadet Corps. He held this position until 1863 and was also in command of the cadet ships and corvettes Flora, Valkyrien, Heimdal, and Jylland.

Throughout his service in this period, he was promoted to corvette captain, frigate captain, and sea captain.

=== Second Schleswig War ===
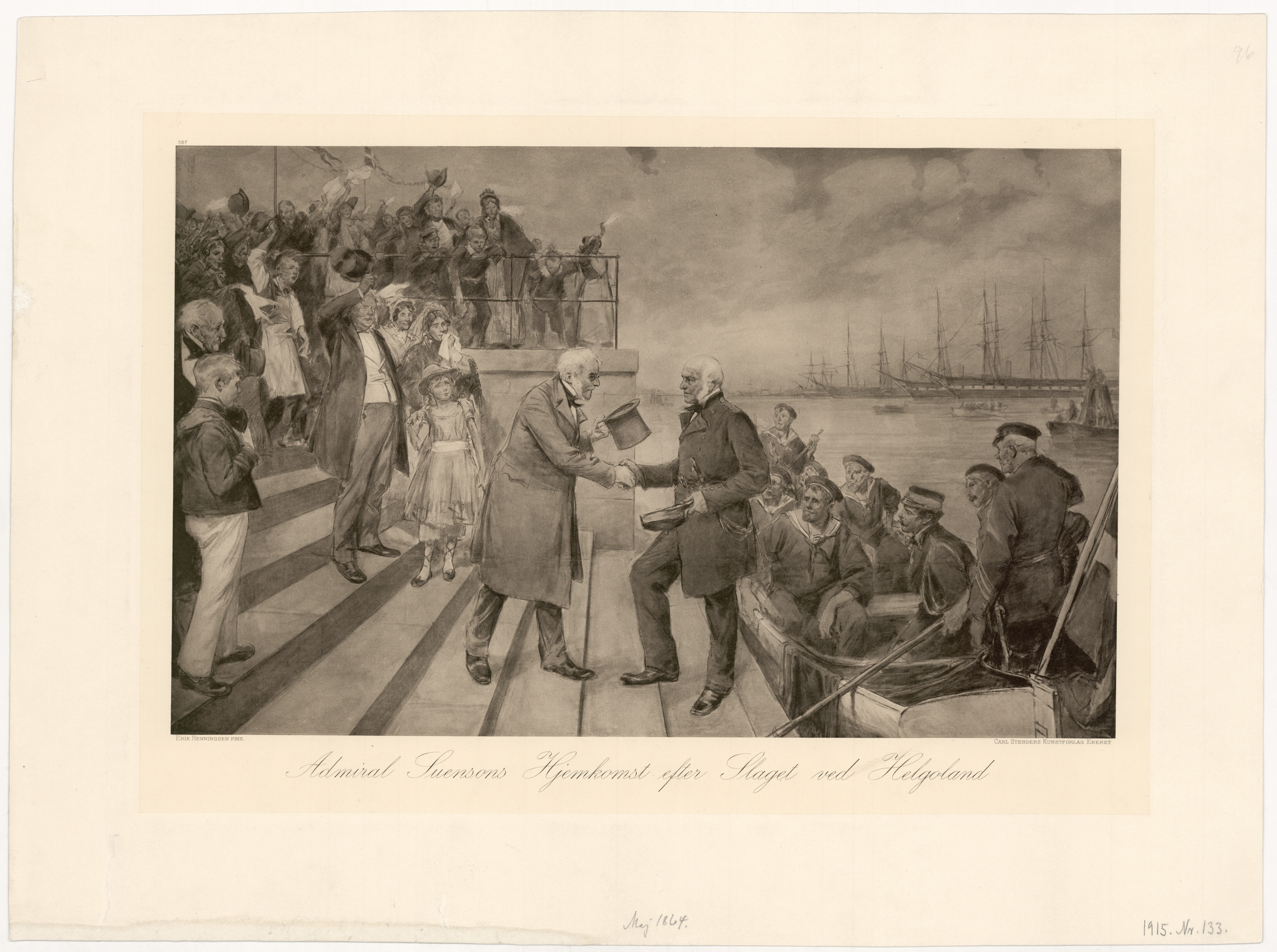
Suenson's return to Copenhagen after the Battle of Helgoland.

Suenson had been in command of the Danish squadron in the North Sea with frigates Niels Juel and Jylland, and corvettes Dagmar and Heimdal since the spring of 1864. Their task was to arrest German merchant ships in the English Channel and the North Sea to ensure a sea blockade in Germany, and to prevent the penetration of the Austrian squadron into Danish waters. On 9 May 1864, the Battle of Heligoland began as the Danish fought the Austrian squadron. The battle ended in a draw, but both sides later claimed victory for themselves.

== Accolade and commemoration ==
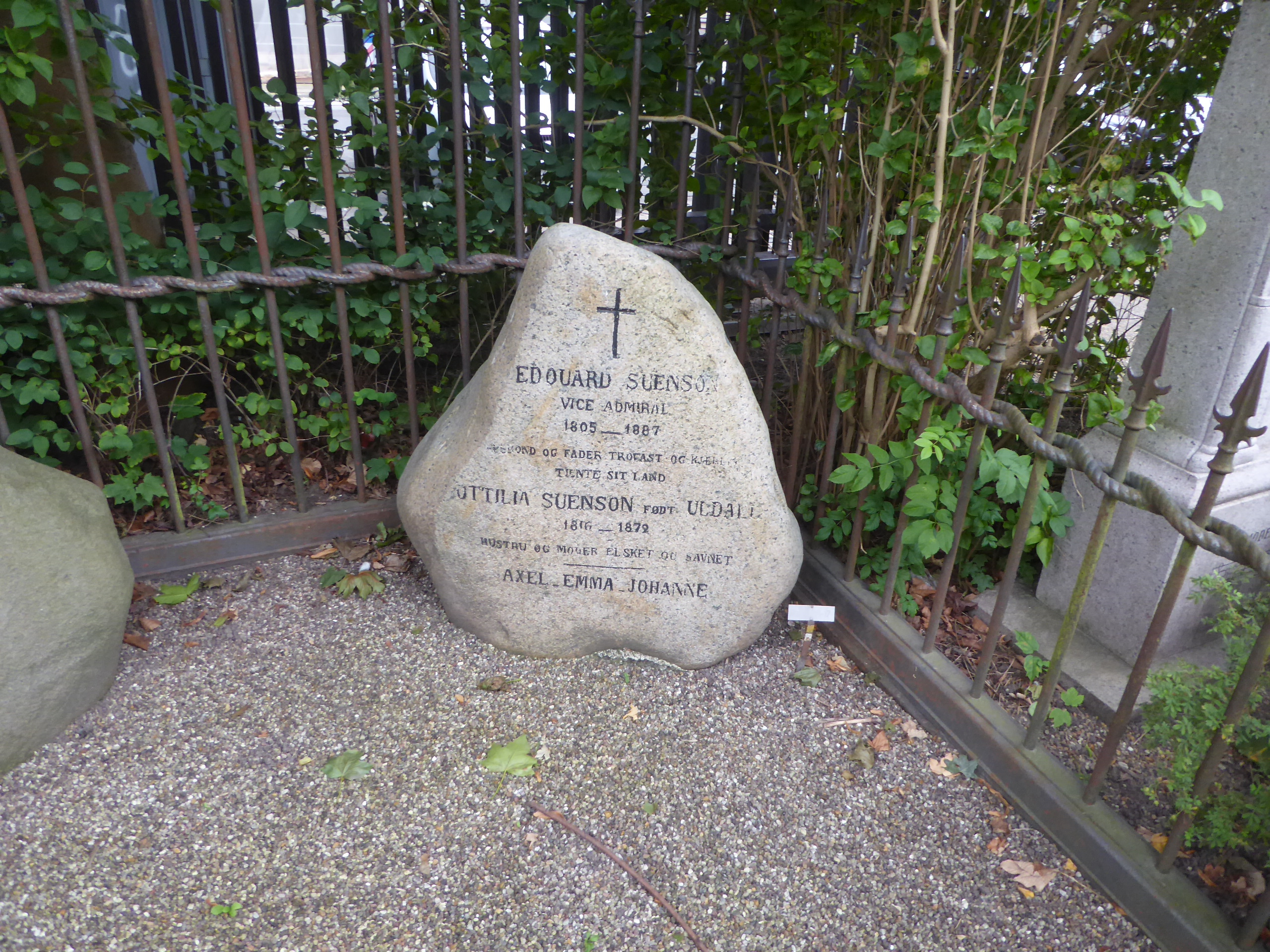
Suenson's grave in Holmens Cemetery

On 15 May 1864, Suenson received the Grand Cross of the Order of the Dannebrog.

Suenson is buried in Holmens Cemetery in Copenhagen.

The Edouard Suenson Memorial at Nyboder in Copenhagen was inaugurated in 1886. It incorporates a bust of him by Theobald Stein. The nearby street Suensonsgade is also named after him.

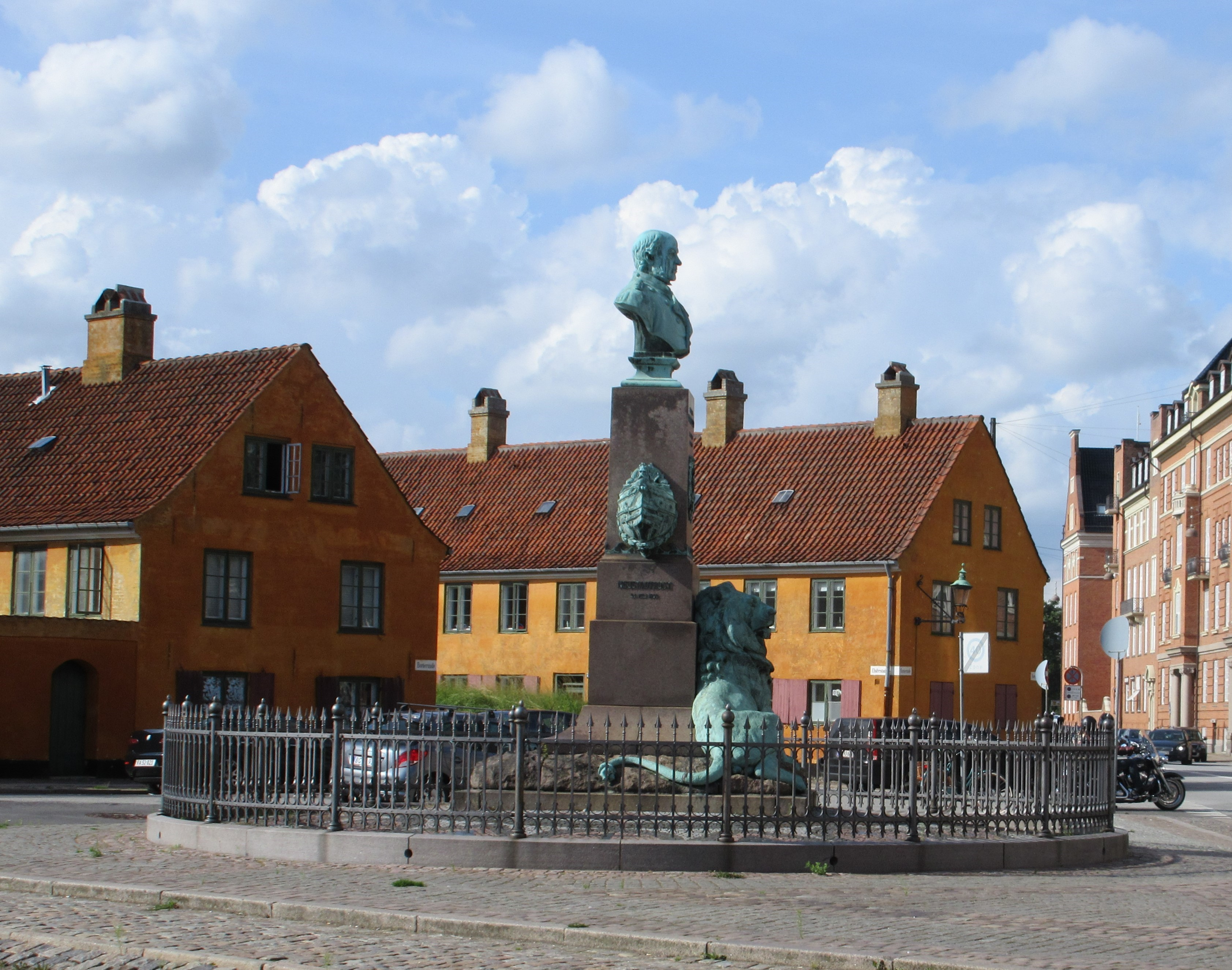
The Edouard Suenson Memorial

A number of ships of the Royal Danish Navy have also been named after Suenson.

An 1881 oil on canvas portrait painting of him by Otto Bache is on display in the Museum of National History at Frederiksborg Castle in Hillerød. He is also seen in paintings by Christian Mølsted, H. Nik. Hansen, Erik Henningsen, and August Jerndorff.

== Taxon named in his honor ==
- The Seagrass eel Chilorhinus suensonii Lütken, 1852
