= Jabra (brand) =

Business and consumer electronics brand

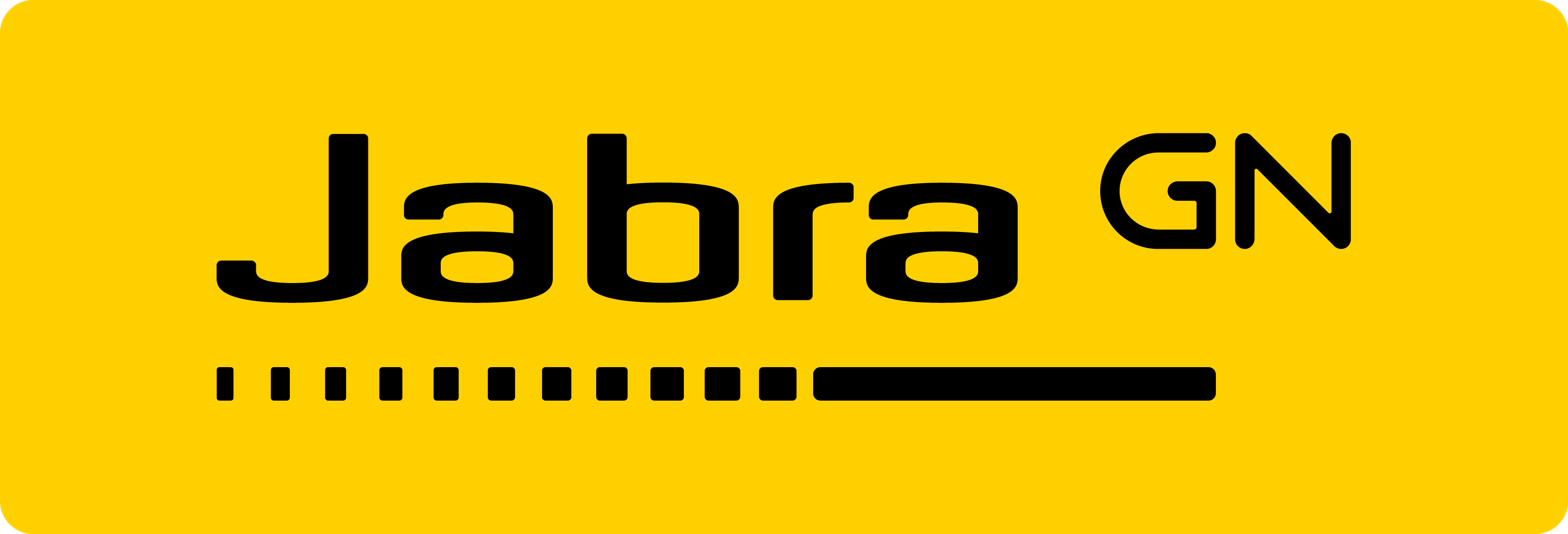
- Company type: Subsidiary
- Industry: Business and consumer electronics
- Founded: 1983; 43 years ago
- Founder: Elwood Norris
- Headquarters: Copenhagen, Denmark
- Area served: Worldwide
- Key people: Peter Karlstromer (CEO)
- Products: Professional and consumer audio
- Number of employees: 2,000
- Parent: GN Store Nord
- Website: www.jabra.com

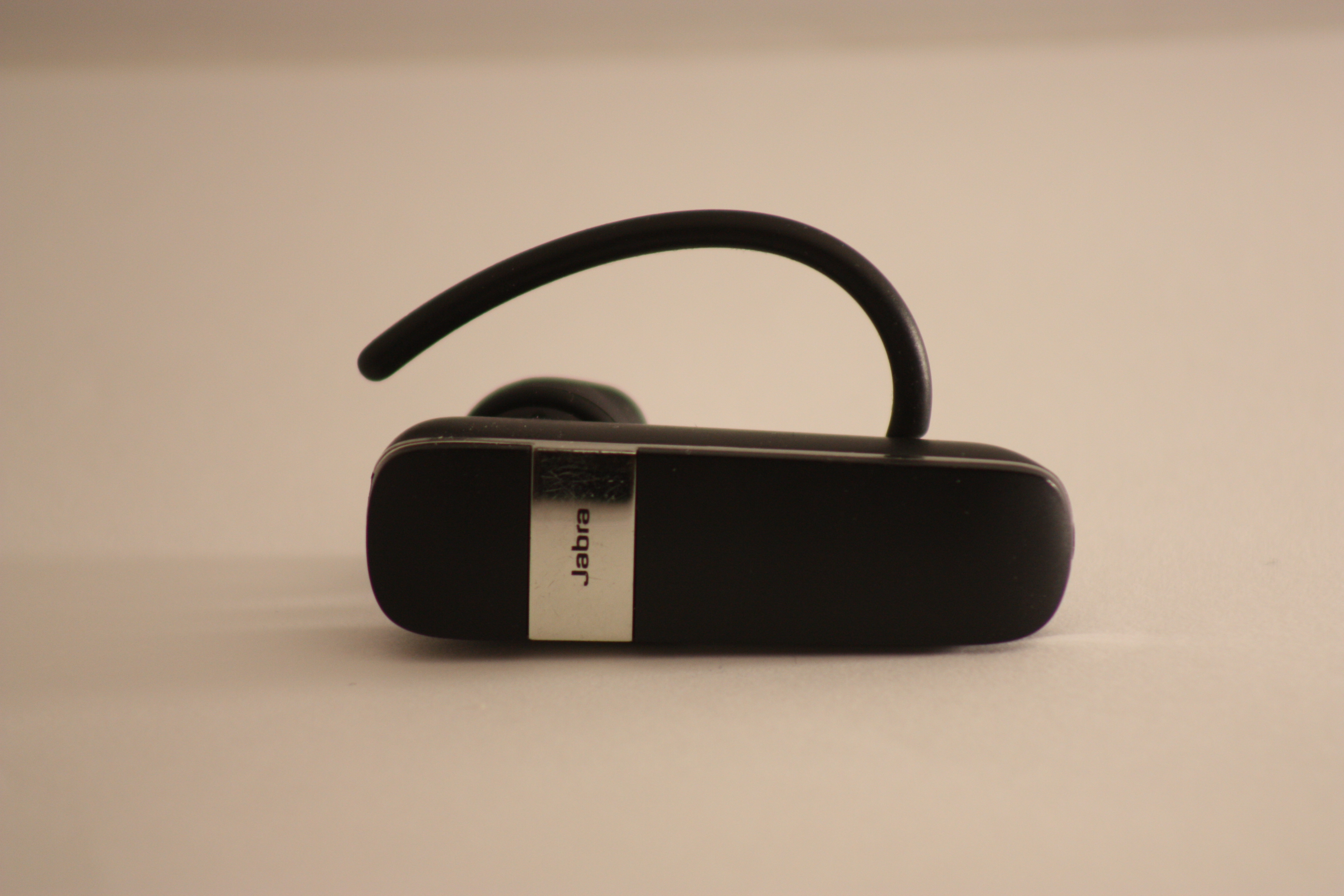
Jabra Bluetooth headset

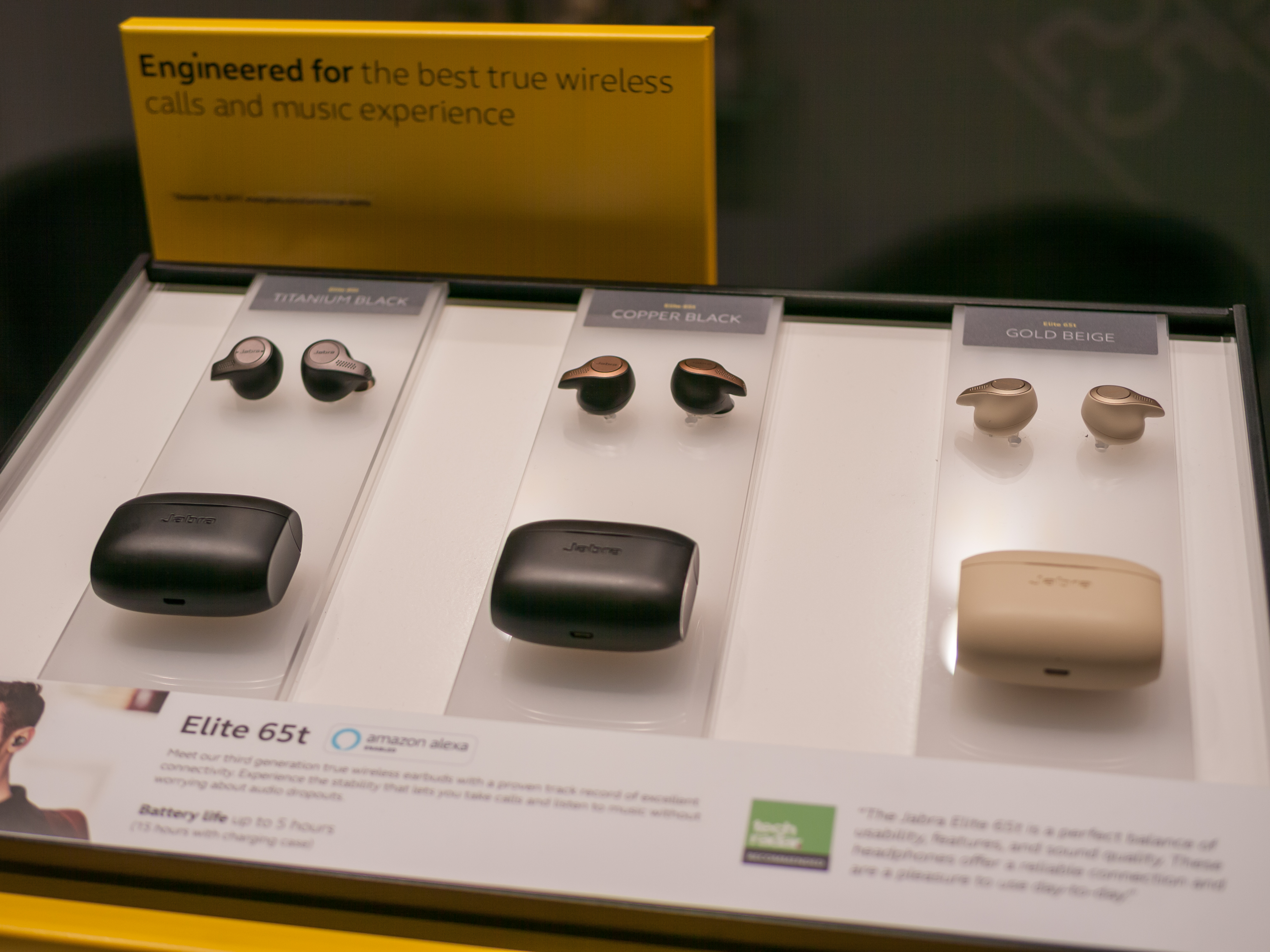
Jabra earbuds

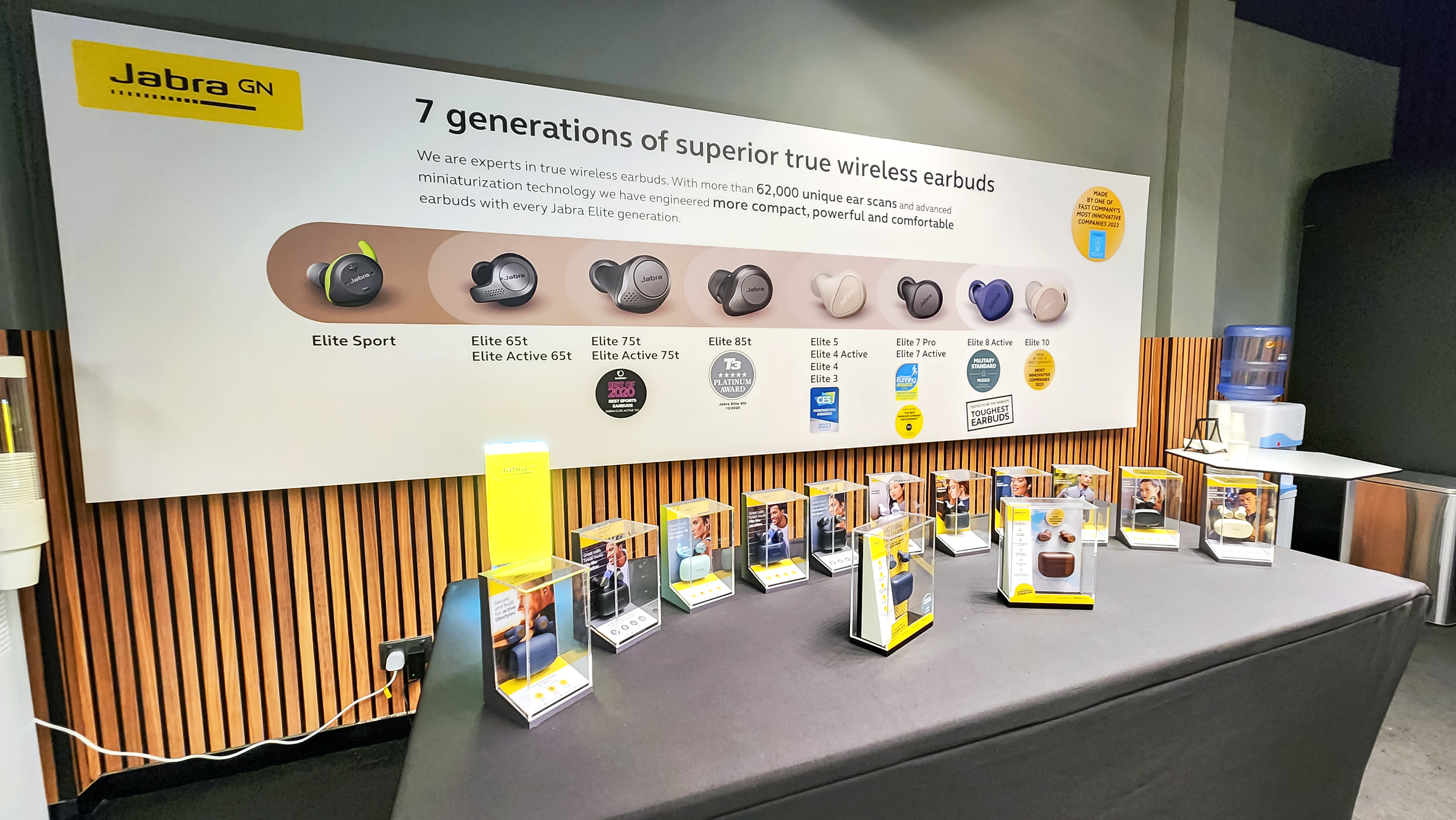
Jabra's wireless earbuds range, September 2023

Jabra is a Danish brand specializing in audio equipment and videoconferencing systems. It is owned by GN Audio, a division of the Danish company GN Group. Jabra engineers, manufactures, and markets wireless, true wireless, and corded headphones for consumers and business customers.

== History ==
Jabra Corporation was founded in the United States in 1983 as Norcom Electronics Corporation of America by the inventor and entrepreneur Woody Norris. The company, holding several patents, was acquired by GN Audio in September 2000, a division of the Danish company GN Group, founded by C. F. Tietgen in 1869 as the Great Northern Telegraph Company. Jabra's manufacturing plant is located in China.

In 2006, GN consolidated its Contact Center and Office headset division under the Jabra brand. A restructuring in 2008 established two divisions within Jabra, later named Enterprise and Consumer. This restructuring facilitated a greater focus on business-to-business and consumer markets respectively. Since 2012, development has also been located in China.

In early 2019, GN Audio acquired Altia Systems for approximately US$125 million, adding videoconferencing products to their lineup. Later in 2019, the first video product from the acquisition was announced, the Jabra PanaCast.

== Jabra and GN Group ==
Jabra's product range includes wireless earbuds, noise-cancelling headphones, headsets, hearing aids, video conferencing cameras, and fitness-tracking sports headphones designed for use during exercise.

GN Group announced in a press-release on 11 June 2024 that Jabra would gradually wind down their Elite and Talk product lines. This announcement was made the same day as they announced the second generation of their most premium earbuds, Elite 8 Active and Elite 10.

In 2024, Jabra unveiled its contact center platform called Engage AI. Engage AI provides immediate feedback to agents during calls, allowing them to adjust their communication style and improve the interaction in the moment. Unlike traditional speech-to-text solutions, Engage AI focuses on analyzing the tone of voice to understand customer sentiment and agent engagement more accurately. The platform also provides supervisors with valuable insights into agent performance and customer interactions, facilitating targeted coaching and development.
