= Statue of Peter Jansen Wessel Tordenskiold, Copenhagen =

Statue of Peter Jansen Wessel Tordenskiold
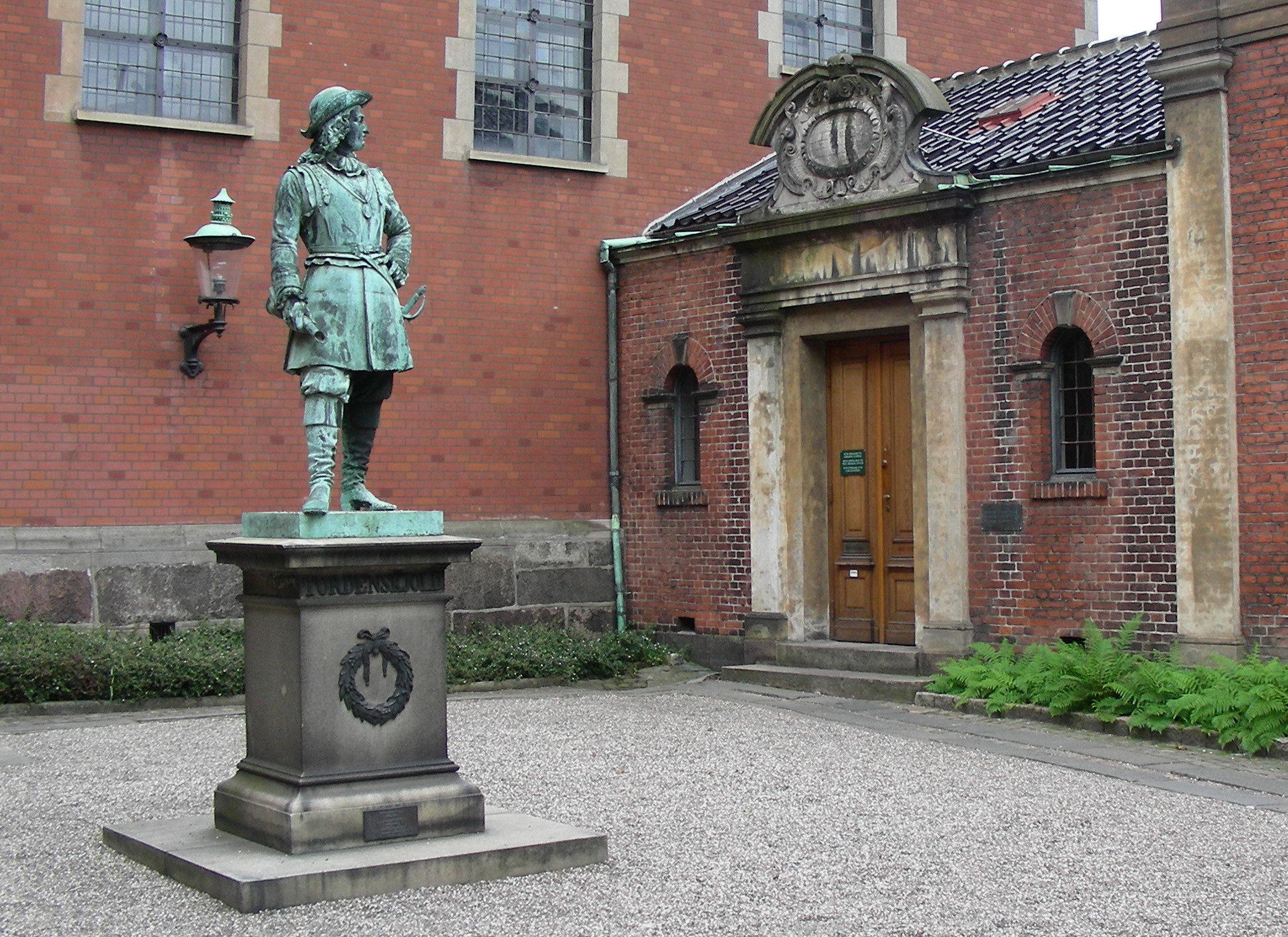
- Artist: Herman Wilhelm Bissen
- Year: 1868
- Medium: Bronze
- Subject: Peter Wessel Tordenskiold
- Location: Copenhagen

The statue of Peter Wessel Tordenskiold, created by Herman Wilhelm Bissen in the 1860s, is a bronze statue of the Norwegian-Danish naval hero Peter Wessel Tordenskiold located in the grounds of the Church of Holmen in Copenhagen, Denmark. Tordenskiold's tomb is located inside the church.

== History ==
The statue was created in 1864–68. and was a gift from merchant Rudolph Puggaard and Justitsråd S.A. Eibeschütz og Hustrus Legat til Stadens Forskiønnelse . It was sculpted by Herman Wilhelm Bissen and cast at Lauritz Rasmussen's bronze foundry. The intention was originally to place it outside the Royal Danish Nautical charts archive which was then located between the Church of Holmen and the site where Bank of Denmark stands today.

== The statue in Trondheim ==
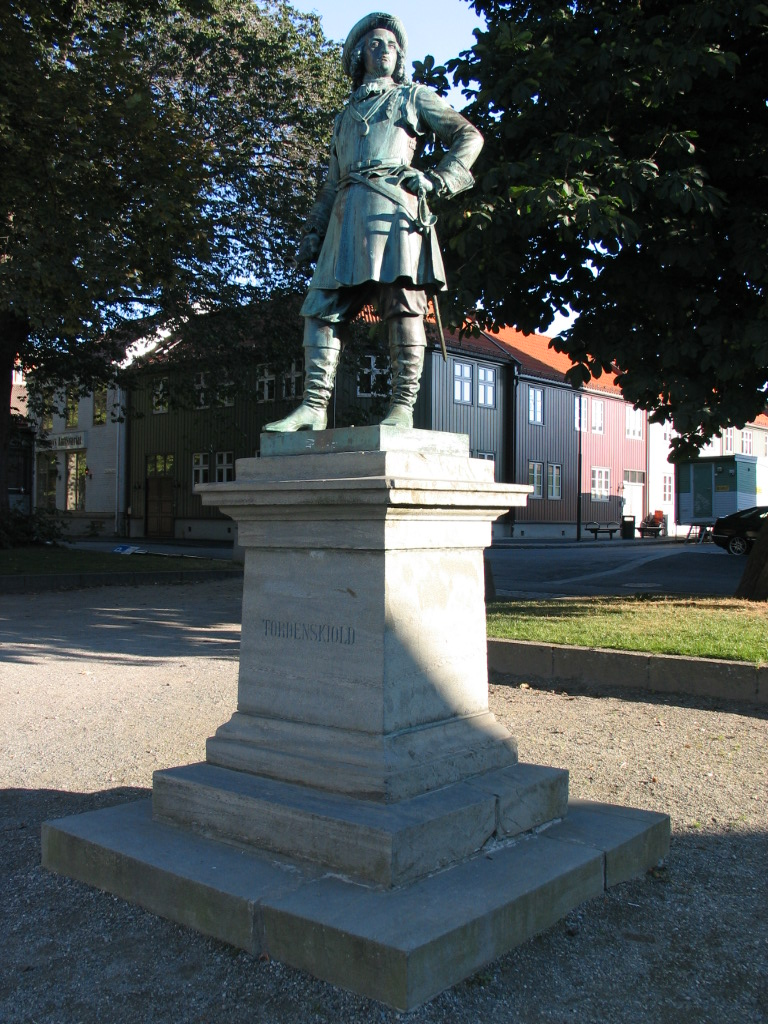
The statue in Trondheim, erected in 1876

Another bronze casting of Bissen's statue was erected in the Norwegian city of Trondheim, Tordenskiold's birthplace, in 1876.
