= Beltone =

American hearing aid company

- Company type: Private
- Industry: Hearing aids
- Founded: 1940; 86 years ago
- Headquarters: Chicago, Illinois, United States; Toronto, Ontario, Canada
- Key people: David Molella (president)
- Parent: GN Store Nord

Beltone is a hearing aid company founded in 1940 and headquartered in Chicago, Illinois. Its products are sold in the United States, Canada, and more than 40 other countries. The Beltone Hearing Care Foundation, a 501(c)(3) charitable organization, was established in 2014 to donate hearing instruments to those in need. In North America, Beltone has over 1,500 independently owned centers that provide hearing screenings, fittings, follow-up care, and aftercare services.

== Types of hearing aids ==
Beltone's smallest hearing aid, the Beltone microInvisa, is about the size of a raspberry. It is also known as an invisible-in-the-canal (IIC) hearing aid. The Beltone microInvisa is custom-manufactured to conform to a patient's ear canal.

In the behind-the-ear (BTE) category, a very small case hides in the shadow behind the ear, and connects to the ear canal via a tiny, clear tube.

== History ==
In 1940, Sam Posen opens Beltone in Chicago, Illinois, and introduces the Model H hearing aid

Beltone launched Mono-Pac in 1944. Later, Beltone introduced its first custom in-the-canal (ITC) hearing aid in 1983, followed by Beltone Digital—its first hearing aid with digital technology—in 1998.

In 2014, Beltone released the first hearing aid made for the iPhone, Beltone First. Beltone announces that its line of advanced hearing aids, including the Beltone First and Beltone Boost, are now compatible with Android via the Beltone HearPlus app. In 2015, Beltone launched the Beltone Legend. Beltone expanded connectivity with the HearPlus App for the Apple Watch and announced the launch of Boost Plus.

In 2020, Beltone Amaze Hearing Aids won the 2020 BIG Innovation Award.

== See also ==
- Hearing loss
- Noise-induced hearing loss
