= SteelSeries =

Danish gaming peripherals and accessory manufacturer

- Type: Subsidiary
- Industry: Video games Computer hardware PC gaming Consumer electronics Application software Esports
- Founded: 2001; 25 years ago
- Founder: Jacob Wolff-Petersen
- Headquarters: Frederiksberg, Denmark
- Key people: Ehtisham Rabbani (CEO); Tino Soelberg (CTO); Christian Andersen (CFO); Rune Berendtsen (CIO)
- Products: Gaming peripherals and accessories: headsets, mice, keyboards, controllers, mousepads
- Parent: GN Store Nord
- Website: steelseries.com

SteelSeries (styled as steelseries), formerly Icemat, is a Danish manufacturer of gaming peripherals and accessories, including headsets, keyboards, mice, controllers, and mousepads. SteelSeries was acquired by GN Store Nord in 2021.

== History ==
SteelSeries was founded as Icemat in 2001 by Jacob Wolff-Petersen. The company's original name was Soft Trading, and it was changed to SteelSeries in 2007. Soft Trading made the Icemat and SteelPad mouse mats, which influenced the company's eventual name change. In 2008, SteelSeries acquired Ideazon, a North America-based developer and manufacturer of gaming peripherals.

Michael von Essen-Mueller, the company's first CEO, helped the company establish its brand and grow to a global footprint. In 2007, SteelSeries hired Bruce Hawver as CEO. The company saw tremendous growth over the next five years as it expanded its portfolio and channels, developed the SteelSeries Engine platform, and added partnerships across the esports and the gaming ecosystem.

In 2012, SteelSeries received investments of undisclosed amounts from U.S.-based private equity firm Catterton Partners and China-based private equity firm ClearVue Partners.

In 2016, SteelSeries introduced its Arctis line of gaming headsets initially consisting of the Arctis 3, Arctis 5, and Arctis 7.

Their popular products include its Rival and Sensei series of mice, Arctis headsets, and Apex keyboards. They also have made 5XL mousepads (QcK line). SteelSeries often creates limited edition collaborations, such as the Valve CS:GO Howl Edition mouse and mousepad, and the CD Projekt Cyberpunk 2077 headset.

In 2019, SteelSeries introduced the Apex Pro gaming keyboard, which used OmniPoint Hall-effect magnetic switches to allow users to adjust the actuation point of individual keys.

In July 2019, SteelSeries was acquired by Axcel, a Nordic private equity firm.

In April 2020, SteelSeries acquired Nahimic audio software developer A-Volute, and in December 2020, SteelSeries acquired gaming accessory manufacturer KontrolFreek.

In October 2021, GN Store Nord announced plans to acquire SteelSeries from Axcel for 8 billion DKK (about US$1.25 billion). The deal closed on 12 January 2022, officially making it a subsidiary.

== Sponsorships ==
SteelSeries supports a number of esports teams and individuals through sponsorships and community support. Sponsored teams include FaZe Clan, Evil Geniuses, Vitality, EDward Gaming, Alliance, among others. Past sponsorships include Manuel "Grubby" Schenkhuizen and Tom "Tsquared" Taylor in 2011. They have also sponsored tournaments, including a preseason Overwatch League tournament named the Steelseries Invitational.

== Partnerships ==
SteelSeries has held partnerships with major companies in the gaming industry, including Blizzard Entertainment, Electronic Arts, Hewlett-Packard (HP), Gunnar Optiks, Valve (Steam), MSI, and Discord.
