= Jørgen Lindegaard =

Danish businessman (born 1948)

Jørgen Lindegaard (born 7 October 1948) is a Danish businessman who has held several major posts in large Danish and Scandinavian companies. Most famously, he was CEO of the SAS Group from May 2001 – late 2006.

== Education and career ==
He graduated with a master's degree in engineering from the Technical University of Denmark in 1975 and started working for Philips Telekommunikation, a subsidiary of the Dutch Philips conglomerate, where he stayed until 1977. At that time he joined Fyns Telefon, a now defunct regional unit of the Danish national telecoms company TDC A/S. In 1991, after 14 years at Fyns Telefon, he joined KTAS the regional equivalent telecoms unit for Copenhagen where he stayed for 4 years until joining GN Store Nord.

After more than 25 years in the telecoms industry he was headhunted to become the CEO of SAS, where he oversaw a turbulent time in the international aviation industry including 9/11 and the deadly crash at Milan Linate of Scandinavian Airlines flight SK686 on 8 October 2001. At the same time, rising oil prices and several staff disputes over pay, staff cuts and working conditions hampered his ability to institute the necessary turn-around at SAS. At the time of his departure, the company was still in severe financial difficulties. He left the company in 2006 to become the CEO of the world's largest facilities management company, and Denmark's largest global employer, ISS A/S.

At the press conference in Stockholm announcing his resignation from SAS on 16 May 2006 he publicly admitted that he was burnt out and said: "It is possible to lose sight of the commercial side of the business when you're so highly focused on the costs, and now, somebody else has to take on the job. However, it is clear that further cost cuts are still needed, as well as commercial initiatives, at SAS".

He is a fellow of the Norwegian Academy of Technological Sciences.
