= Edouard Suenson Memorial =

Monument in Copenhagen

Coordinates: 55°41′18″N 12°35′22″E

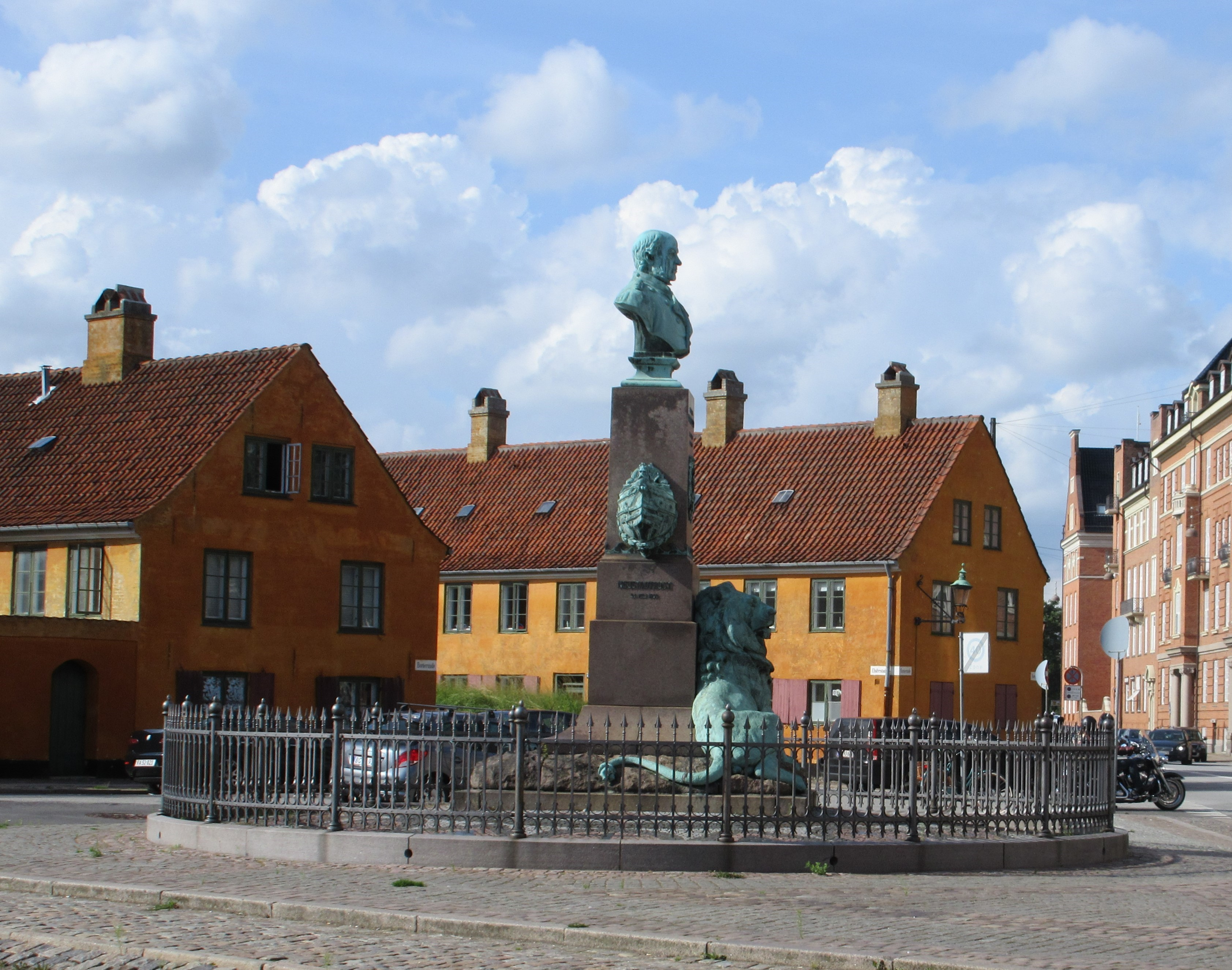
The Edouard Suenson Memorial

The Edouard Suenson Memorial is located in front of Nyboder on Store Kongensgade in Copenhagen, Denmark. It commemorates Vice Admiral Edouard Suenson who commanded the Danish ships in the Battle of Heligoland 9 May 1864. The monument was designed by Theobald Stein and inaugurated on 9 May 1889. The bust was cast in Lauritz Rasmussen's bronze foundry.

== Description ==
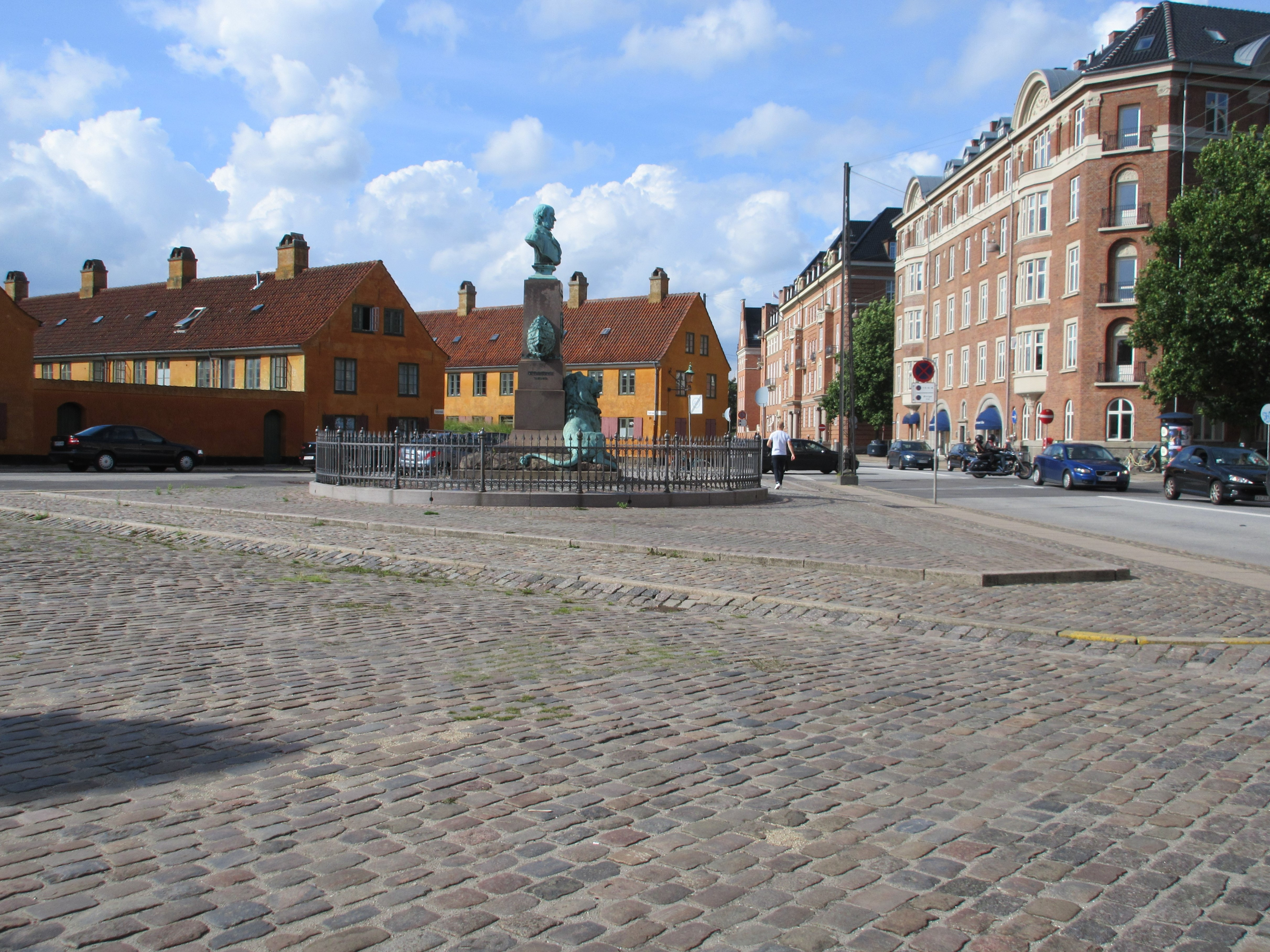
The memorial

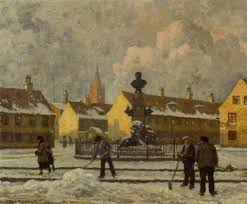
The monument seen in a painting by Paul Gustav Fischer

The monument consists of a bust of Suenson mounted on a high plinth decorated with a laurel wreath and prows and Suenson's coat of arms. A pair of lions rest at the base of the plinth. On its front side, it has the inscription: "VICE-ADMIRAL/EDOUARD SUENSON/Vorn 13 APRIL 1805/DIED 16 MAY 1887 The foot of the plinth is guarded by bronze lions which hold a coat of arms with the inscription "HELGOLAND/9 MAY/1864".
