= Edouard Suenson (businessman) =

Danish naval officer and businessman (1842 – 1921)

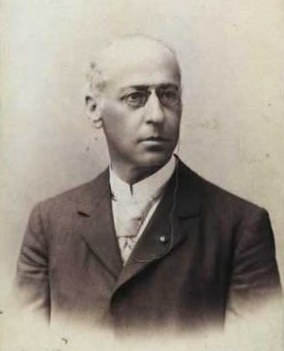
Photographic portrait of Suenson

Commodore Edouard Suenson (26 July 1842 – 21 September 1921) was a Danish naval officer and businessman who served as managing director of the Great Northern Telegraph Company from 1877 and later as chairman of the board.

== Early life and naval career ==
Suenson was born on 26 July 1842 in Copenhagen, the son of the naval officer Edouard Suenson (1805–87) and Ottilia Uldall (1816–72). He enrolled at the Danish Naval Cadet Academy in 1855 while his father headed the institution. In 1861, he became a junior lieutenant with Gerner's Medal and the King's honorary sword. In 1862–63, he was in the Danish West Indies and the Mediterranean Sea with the corvette Dagmarf. During the Second Schleswig War, he served on board the ship of the line Sjiold.

In 1865–68, he was in French military service, first in the training squadron in the Mediterranean and later in East Asian. Ge was seriously wounded during the French expedition to Korea. After completing a circumnavigation of the globe, he returned to Denmark. In 1868, he was promoted to senior lieutenant. In 1870 he was adjutant to the Minister of the Navy, General H. Raasløff. In 1875. he resigned from the navy with rank of captain. In 1891, he was awarded the rank of commodore.

== Civilian career ==
Back in Denmark, Suenson was introduced to C. F. Tietgen by Raasløff. Tietgen persuaded him to apply for leave from the navy and go into the service of the Great Nordic China and Japan Extension Telegraph Company. Suenson was both responsible ifer laying (Vladivostok–Japan, Japan–China and along the coast of China) any organizing the company's operations in general.

After successfully completing his assignments in the Far East, Suenson returned to Denmark. Back in Copenhagen, he worked for the Danish parent company. In 1877, he became managing director of the Great Northern Telegraph Company ( into which the aforementioned company had merged in 1872). He held this position until 1908. In 1890 he also became a member of the board- In 1898–1916, he succeeded Tietgen as chairman. Suenson was instrumental in more than doubling the company's network of underwater cables. At the same time, he completed a financial consolidation which could give the company the necessary strength against its powerful competitors.

in 1876–98, Suenson was a board member of Em. Z. Svitzers Bjergnings Entreprise. In 1876–1916, he was a board member (from 1890 as chairman) of the marine insurance company De private Assurandeurer. In 1897–1900, he was a board member of Kjøbenhavns Telefonselskab. In 1897–1921, he was a board member of Nordisk Brandforsikringsselskab. In 1902–21, he was a member of Privatbankens bank council. – Chamberlain 1901.

== Personal life ==
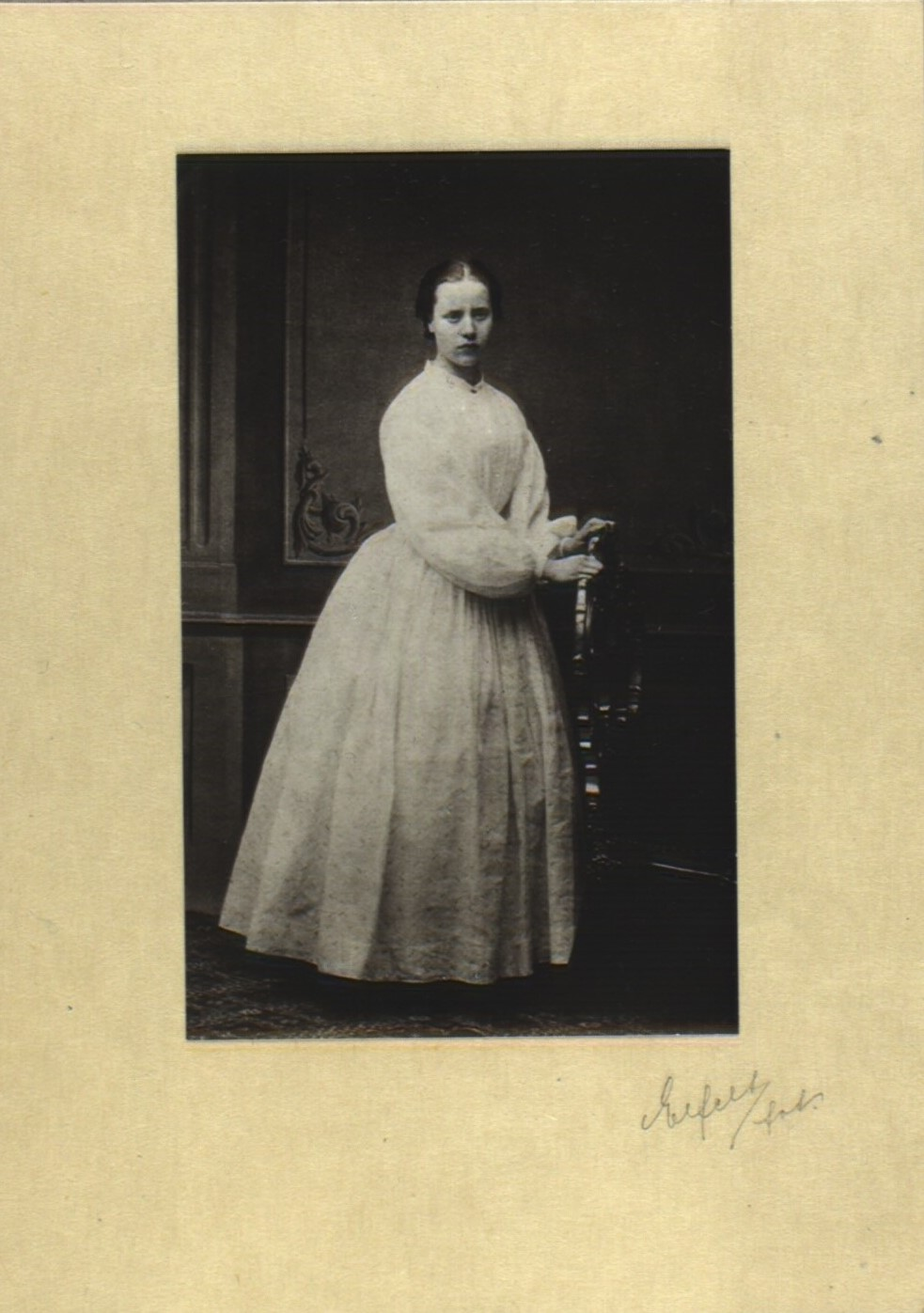
Magna Suenson

On 28 July 1871, Suenson married Magna Cecilie Camilla Lütken (1846–1923). She was a daughter of naval officer and later Minister of the Navy O. H. Lïtken (1813–83) and Annine Buntzen (1819–91). The couple had two sons and two daughters. The elder son Kay Suenson (1762–1954) worked for the Great Northern Telegraph Company. The younger son Edouard Suenson (1877–1958) was a civil engineer and professor at the Technical University of Denmark. The daughter Ottilia Suenson (1763–1960) was married to the lawyer Christian Frederik Brorson. The daughter Anine Suenson (1881–1948) was married to president of the Maritime and Commercial Court of Denmark Jørgen Hansen Koch.

Suenson died on 21 September 1921 in Copenhagen. He is buried at Vrønshøj Cemetery. He has published an account of his circumnavigation of the globe in Tidsskrift for Søfart.

Suenson is one of the men seen in Peder Severin Krøyer's monumental 1904 oil-in-canvas group portrait painting Men of Industry.

== Awards ==
In 1867, Suenson was created a Knight of the Order of the Dannebrog. In 1881, he was created a Commander of the Order of the Dannebrog of the 2nd Class. In 1890, he was awarded the Cross of Honour. In 1894, he was created a 1st-class Commander of the Order of the Dannebrog. In 1900, he was awarded the Medal of Merit. In 1906, he was awarded the Grand Cross (i diamanter, 1915).
