= Holmen Church =

Coordinates: 55°40′36″N 12°35′01″E

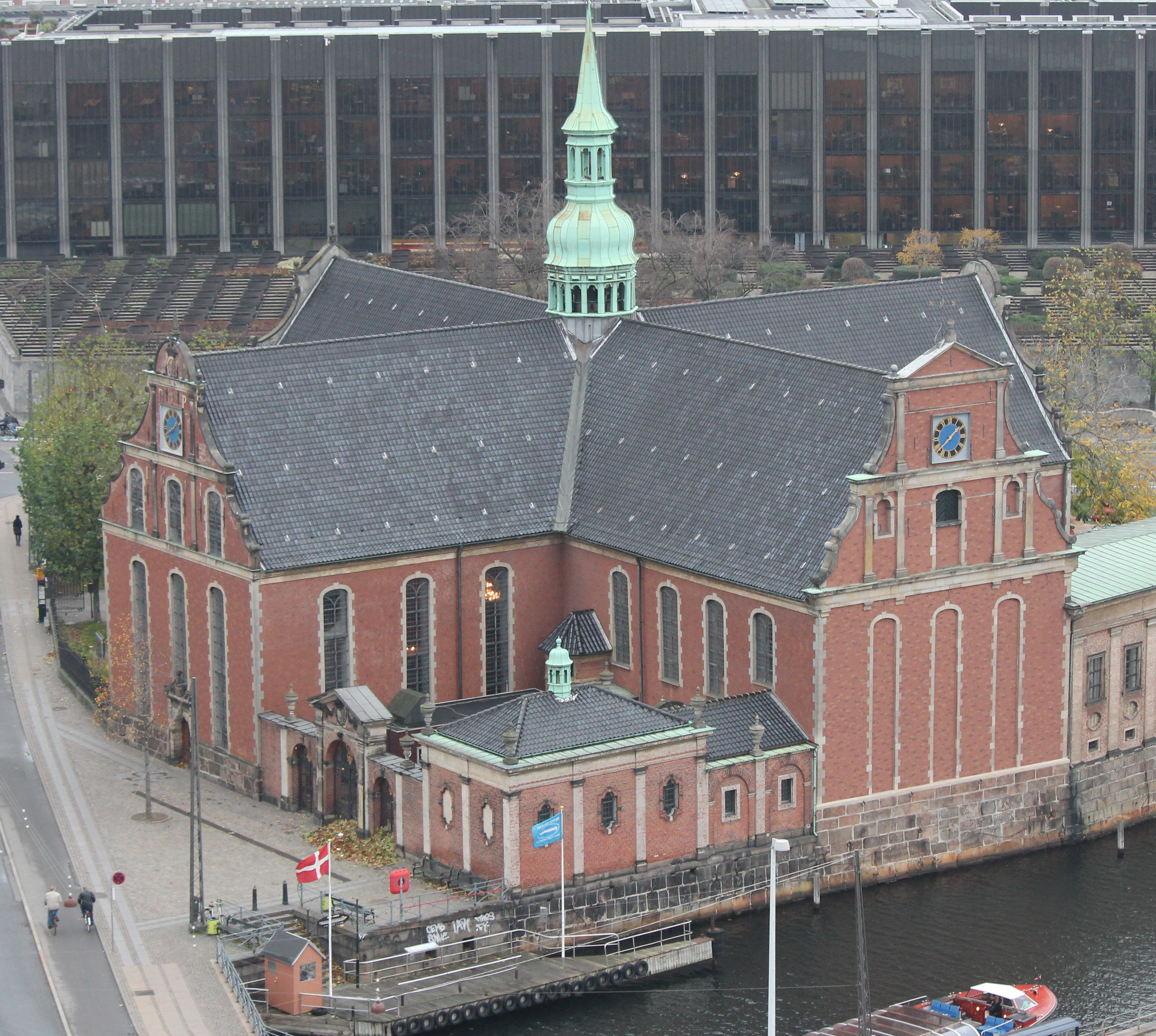
- Holmen Church
- Location: Copenhagen, Denmark
- Denomination: Church of Denmark
- Website: www.holmenskirke.dk

History
- Status: Church

Architecture
- Architect(s): Leonhard Blasius; Christian IV (the spire)
- Style: Renaissance
- Completed: 1563 (forge); 1619 (church)

Administration
- District: City centre

The Holmen Church (Danish: Holmens Kirke) is a Parish church in central Copenhagen in Denmark, on the street called Holmens Kanal. First built as an anchor forge in 1563, it was converted into a naval church by Christian IV. It is famous for having hosted the wedding in 1967 between Margrethe II of Denmark, queen of Denmark between 1972 and 2024, and Prince Henrik. It is the burial site of such notabilities as naval heroes Niels Juel and Peter Tordenskjold, and composer Niels Wilhelm Gade, and contains artwork by, among others, Bertel Thorvaldsen and Karel van Mander.

== The church building ==
The appearance of the Holmen Church today closely resembles that of the renovation in 1872, except for the colour. The windows are in clear glass and predominantly set in iron. The spire is dressed in copper just like small spire on the confessional's roof. The church is of Lutheran denomination.

== Interior ==
The church's pipe organ was originally made by Lambert Daniel Kastens and installed in 1738, and the façade remains in place today. The actual organ, however, is from 1956.

The current pulpit was installed in 1662 and was carved by Abel Schrøder and stands in the natural colour of its oak, except for the king and queen's monograms and crowns which are gilded. It is the oldest preserved pulpit in Copenhagen, and the most richly decorated. It stands from floor to ceiling, and depicts Christian history from Moses holding the basket up to Jesus Christ.

The oldest baptismal font in the church is in wrought iron and stands 117 centimetres (46 in) tall. A white marble font was installed in 1756, created by Carl Frederik Stanley in classicist style, but is no longer in the church. The new baptismal font from 1872 was made by the sculptor Evens by Ludvig Fenger's design, in black marble and sandstone.

A model of Niels Juel's ship Christianus Quintus hangs from the ceiling in the church.

== Gallery ==
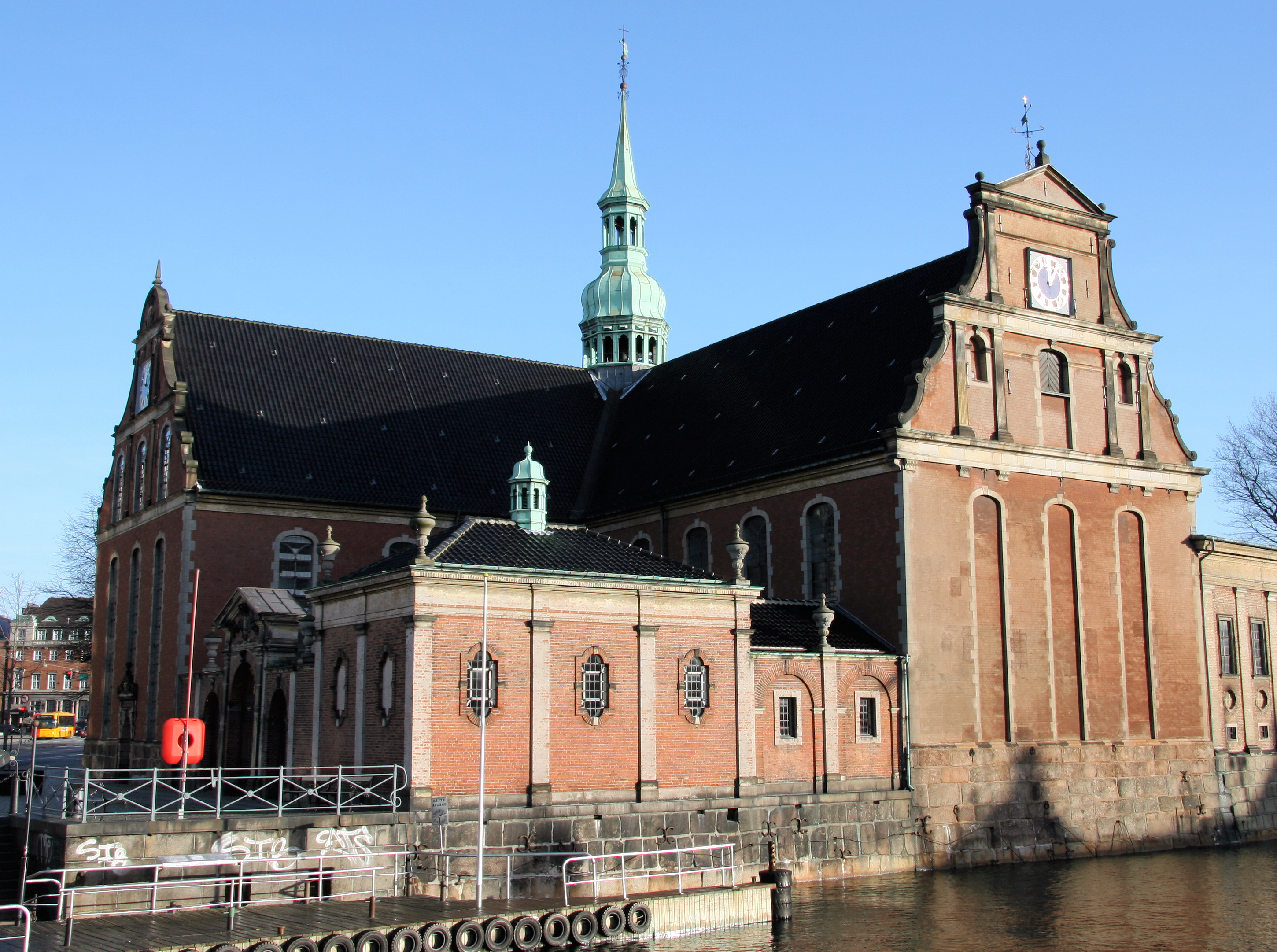
Exterior

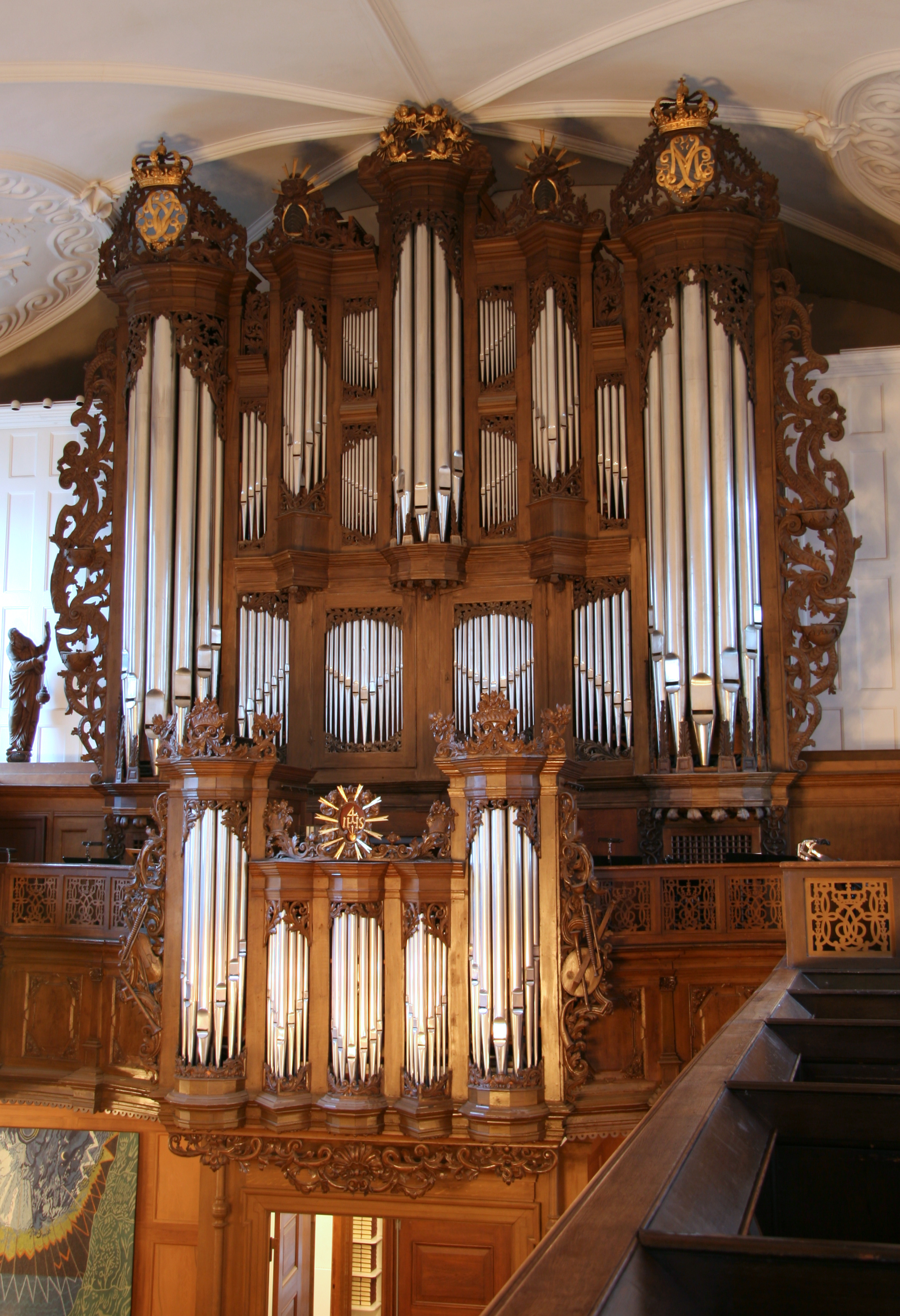
Organ

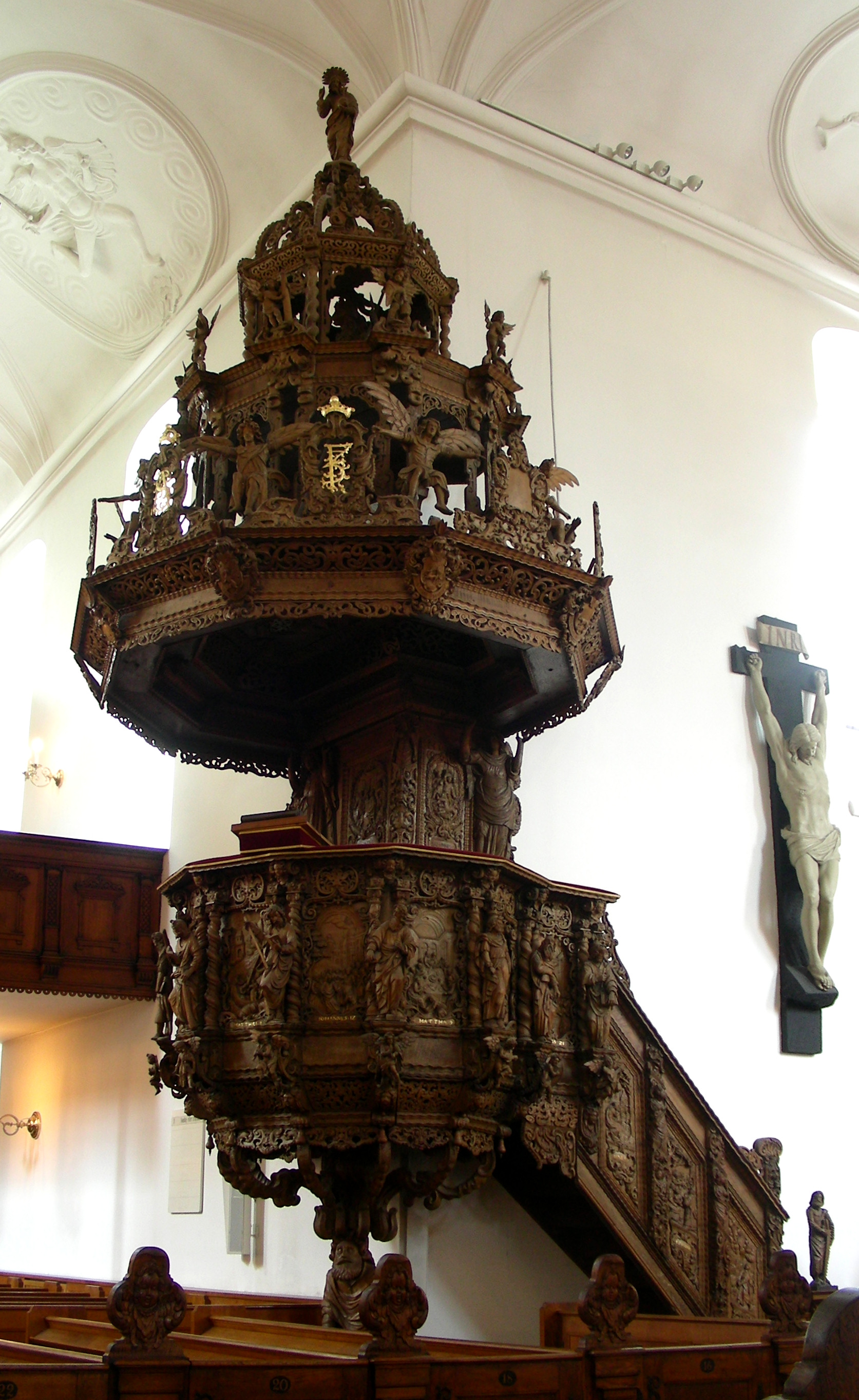
Pulpit

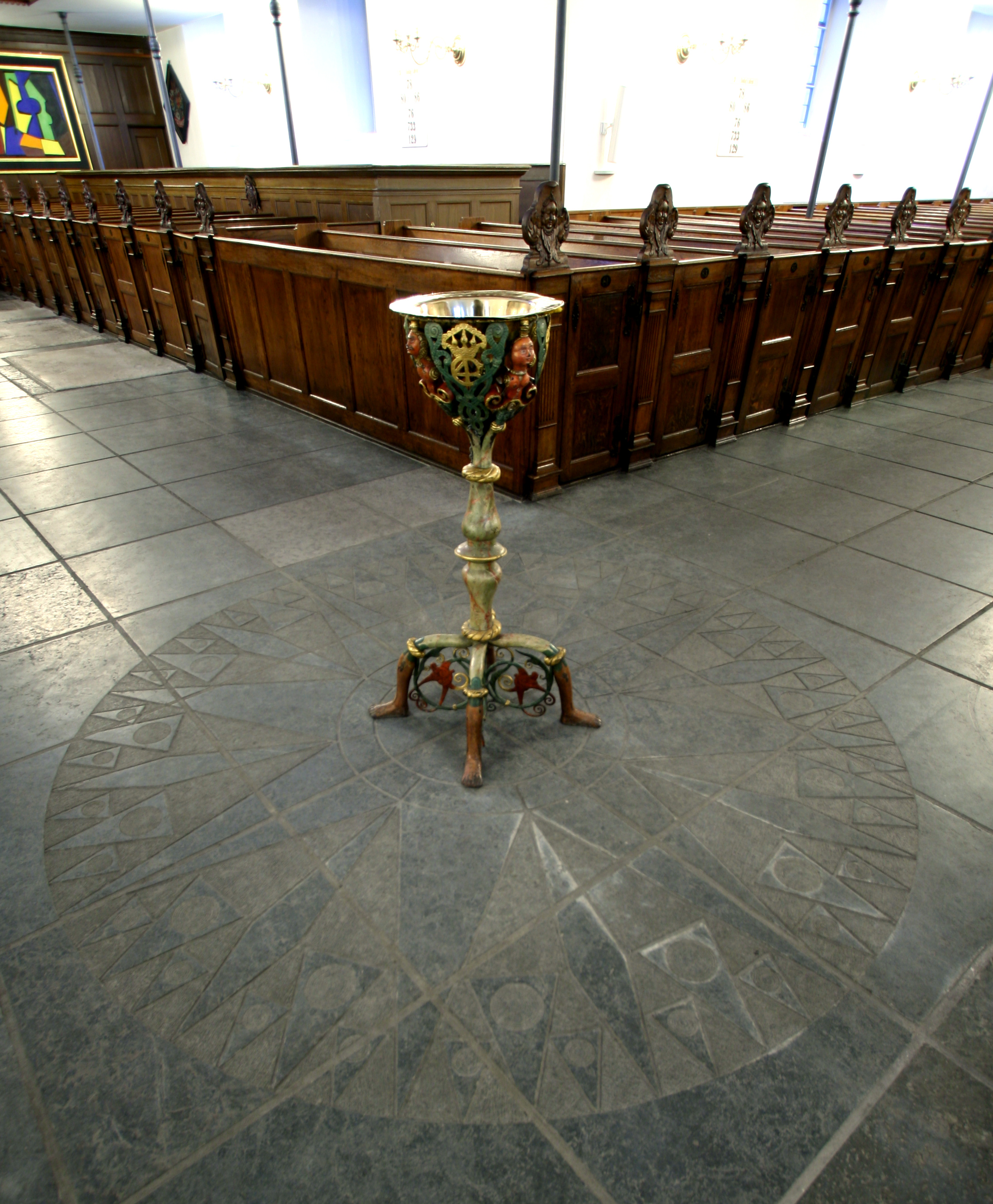
Compass rose and baptismal font

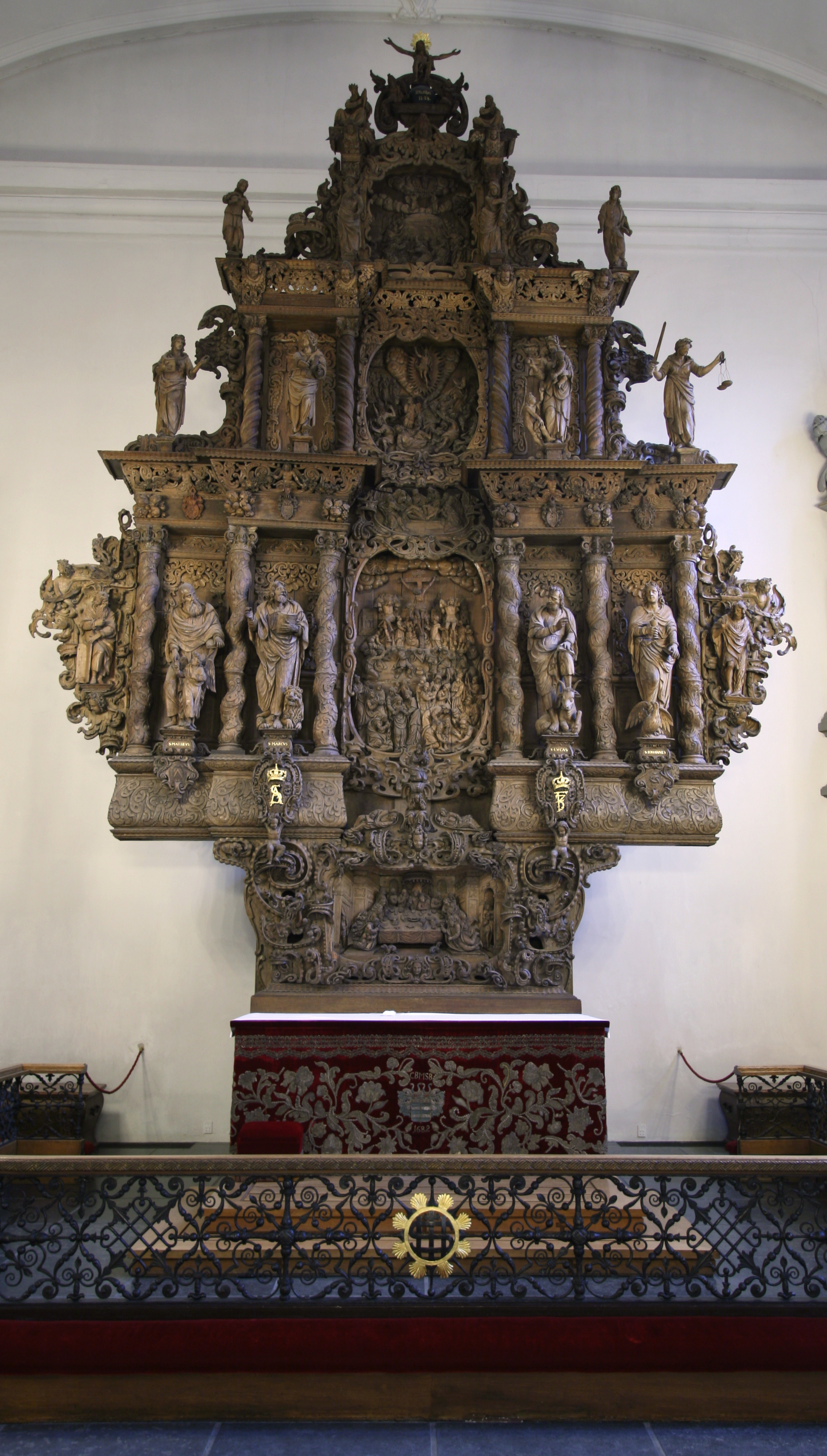
Over the altar

== History ==
In medieval Copenhagen, Holmen (or Bremerholm) was an actual island. However, in the 16th century, city restructuring made it less of an island and more of a peninsula surrounded by Holmens Canal. On this peninsula, Christian III of Denmark founded a shipyard which became synonymous with the name Holmen.

When the shipyard moved to Nyholm on Christianshavn, the name Holmen followed, and Bremerholm then became Gammelholm (old island), a name which is rarely used today. Holmens Canal was filled in the 1860s, but the name lives on as a street.

=== The anchor forge ===
In 1562–63, Frederick II of Denmark built an anchor forge for Holmen, which was placed on the other side of the canal. The building was atypically shaped, as special consideration was given not to spoil the view from the king's castle, Christiansborg. The actual forge was hidden behind a taller building, called the tower, which was given a handsome front in Italian style facing the castle, and which was erected by Peter de Dunckers.

=== The first church ===
In 1617, Christian IV of Denmark built houses for the navy's personnel between the Church of Saint Nikolaj and Holmen. This created an influx in population which made it necessary to build a larger church, which the king had set up in the former anchor forge.

At first, the reconstruction into a church caused no redesign of the building's blueprints. The church was consecrated on 5 September 1619, but craftsmen were still working on the church during 1620.

The building had certain similarities to a village church, with the higher tower as a bell tower in one end, but the tower was not an actual part of the church, and the bells were situated in the opposite end of the building.

Not much is known about the decoration of the first church.

=== The cruciform church ===
The church quickly became too small, and already in 1641, it was decided to expand it into a cruciform church. The tower was incorporated into the church, and the remainder of the church was brought to the same height. The two new arms are slightly shorter than the two old ones. Leonhard Blasius was the builder of the church, but indications are that the king decided on the layout of the church, modeled after the Glücksburg Castle church.

The walls are tile on a high foundation of granite blocks. The new arms were built in yellow bricks which are smaller than the stone used in the tower. In order for the building to have a uniform look, the walls were painted in yellow and red vertical stripes on which white lines were painted in order to resemble a brick wall.

The spire was built in two stories with the bells in the bottom half. This spire has caused significant problems over the years, as the wooden construction of the roof was not strong enough to carry the weight. The construction was reinforced in 1698 and in 1793, but not until 1930 was the collapse halted by the introduction of an iron construction. It is estimated that the spire sits 60 cm (two feet) lower than when it was first built.

=== Later changes ===
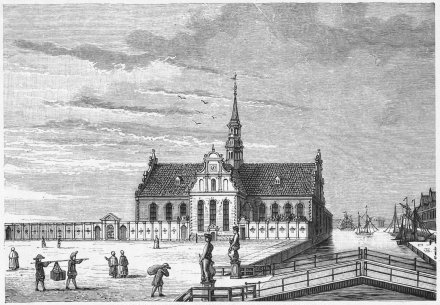
The church in the 18th century

The major Copenhagen fires of 1728 and 1795 did not affect the Holmen Church, and the bombardments in 1659 and 1807 only caused minor damage to the church, and thus the fundamental shape of the church today is the same as when it was first constructed. However, a cannonball is visible in the plinth on the northern side of the choir, supposedly from the Swedish assault in 1658.

In 1697 a chapel was built for Niels Juel in the church, designed by Ernst Brandenburger. This building was later removed after the construction of Niels Juel's mausoleum.

When Roskilde Cathedral was renovated, Christian IV of Denmark's portal from 1635 was transferred to the eastern gable of the Holmen Church.

The sculpting and stucco were repaired early in the 20th century, as had become necessary due to the sinking of spire construction. In preparation for the wedding between Hereditary Princess Margrethe and Prince Henrik in 1967, which took place in the church, the church underwent major restoration. This included changing the wooden floor to stone.

== See also ==
- Cemetery of Holmen
- Statue of Peter Jansen Wessel Tordenskiold, Copenhagen
