= GN Store Nord =

Danish company

Coordinates: 55°44′19″N 12°23′12″E

GN Store Nord A/S
- Type: Public
- Traded as: Nasdaq Copenhagen: GN; OMX Copenhagen 25 component
- Industry: Electronics
- Founded: 1869; 157 years ago
- Founder: Carl Frederik Tietgen
- Headquarters: Ballerup, Denmark
- Key people: Peter Karlstromer (CEO (GN Store Nord)); Søren Jelert (CFO); Calum MacDougall (President Enterprise (Jabra) Division); Peter Justesen (President Hearing Division); Ehtisham Rabbani (President Gaming (SteelSeries) Division)
- Products: Intelligent hearing solutions; Audio devices; Video communication technology; Gaming peripherals
- Revenue: DKK 4,164 million (Q3 2024); USD 585.87 million (Q3 2024)
- Operating income: DKK 553 million (Q3 2024); USD 77.81 million (Q3 2024)
- Net income: DKK 289 million (Q3 2024); USD 40.66 million (Q3 2024)
- Total assets: DKK 23,552 million (2021)
- Total equity: DKK 10,187 million (Q3 2024); USD 1,426.18 million (Q3 2024)
- Number of employees: 7,228 (2021)
- Subsidiaries: Jabra; ReSound; SteelSeries; Beltone; Interton; BlueParrott; Danavox; FalCom
- Website: gn.com

GN Store Nord A/S is a Danish manufacturer of hearing aids (GN ReSound/GN Hearing), speakerphones, videobars and headsets (Jabra (GN Audio) and SteelSeries). GN Store Nord A/S is listed on NASDAQ OMX Copenhagen (ISIN code DK0010272632).

== History ==
=== The Great Northern Telegraph Company ===
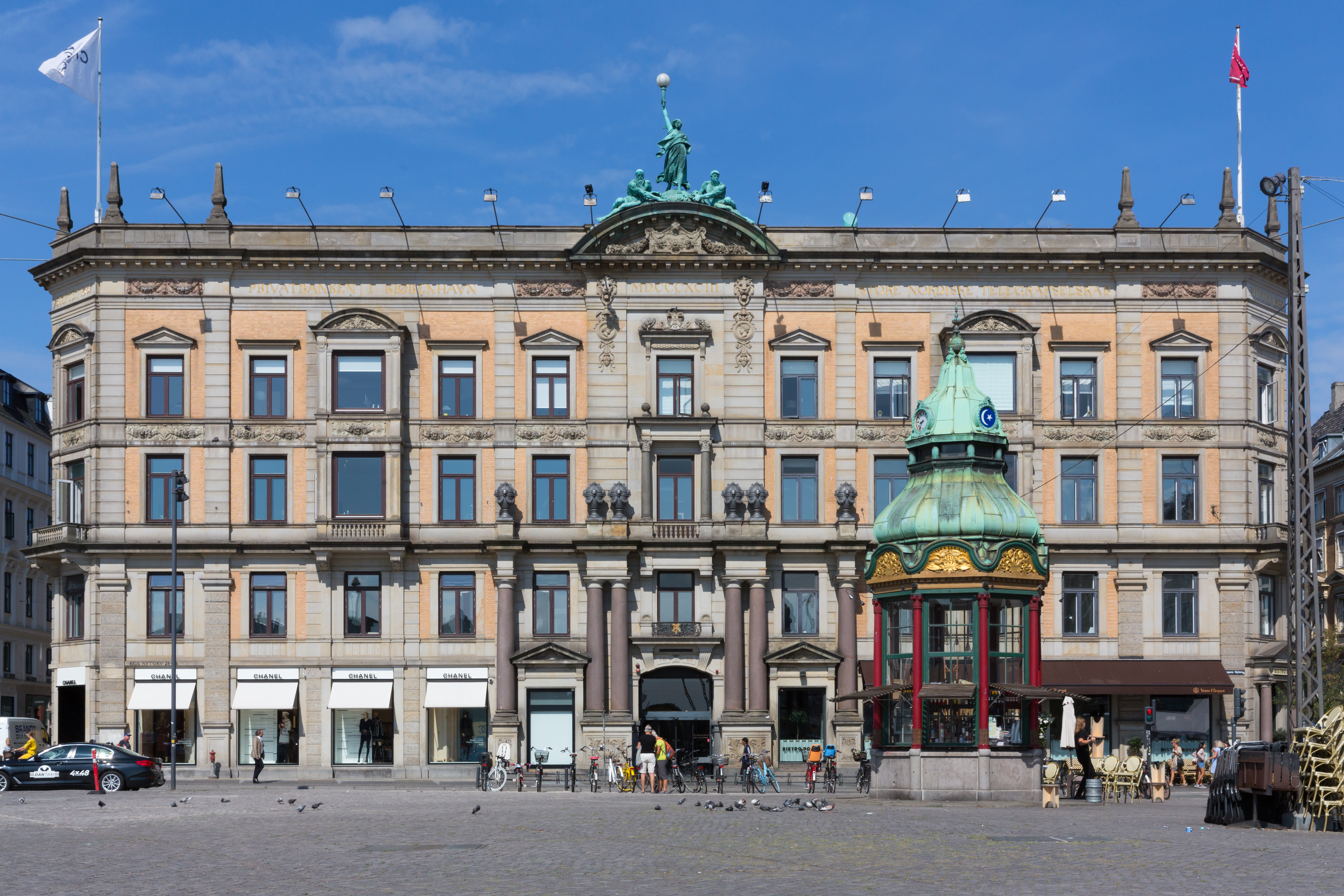
Great Northern Telegraph Company building, former headquarters in Kongens Nytorv, Copenhagen, built 1893

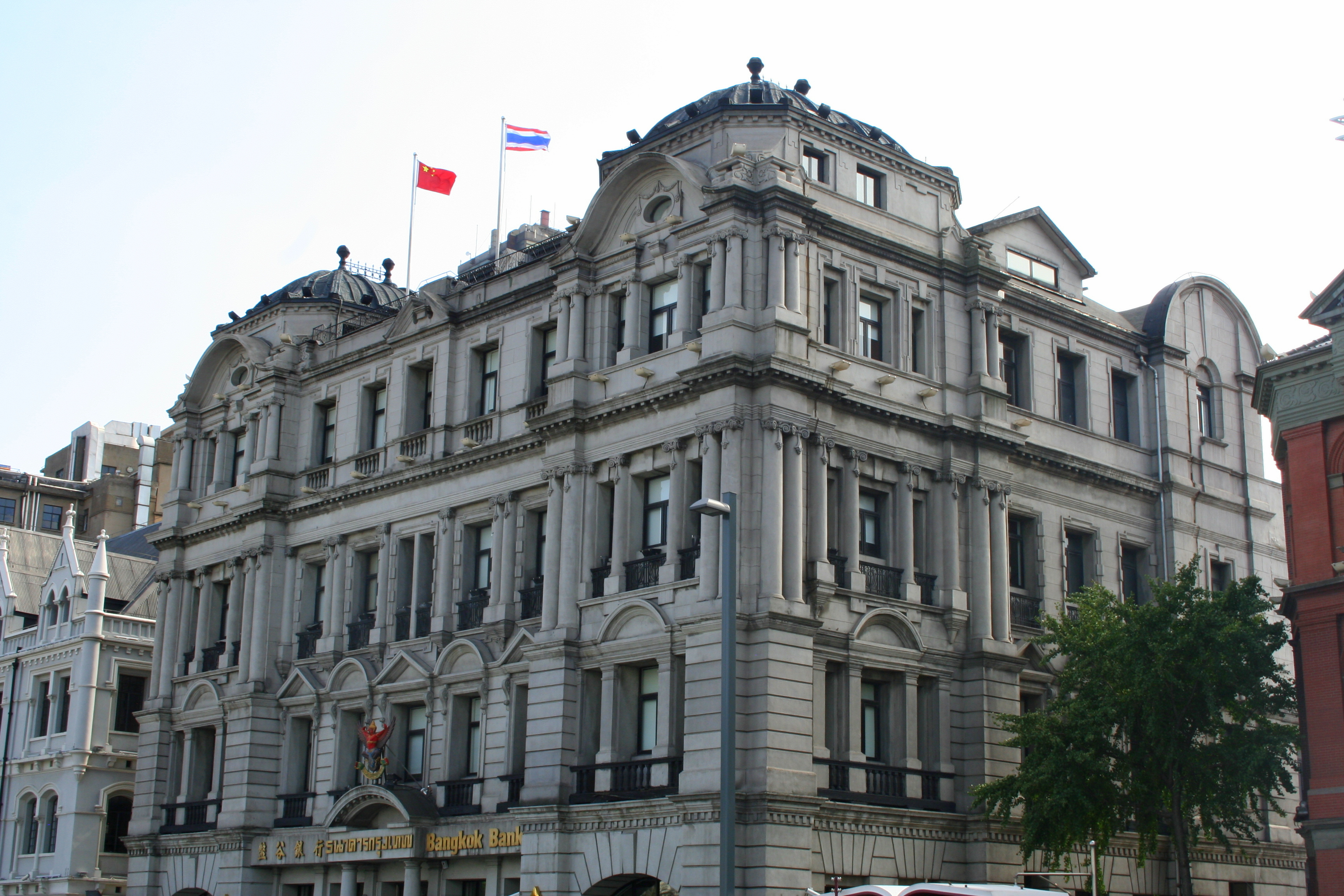
The former headquarters of the GNTC on The Bund, Shanghai

The company was founded as The Great Northern Telegraph Company (Det Store Nordiske Telegrafselskab A/S) in Denmark in June 1869. It was set up as a merger of three recently established telegraph companies initiated by Danish industrial mogul Carl Frederik Tietgen. The aim of the firm was to create a worldwide telegraph company.

The starting point of The Great Northern Telegraph Company (now GN Store Nord) was a concession agreement, which C.F. Tietgen made with the Russian Tzar in 1869. The agreement gave The Great Northern Telegraph Company exclusive rights – and obligations – to establish and run a telegraph line in Russia. This represented a great pioneer task for the company in establishing connections from Europe to the Far East. The Russian authorities ran the actual construction work in Russia. They had already set up a telegraph line in parts of Siberia but were looking for a business partner to cover China and Japan before continuing the Russian line all the way east to Vladivostok. Thus, The Great Northern Telegraph Company was given the responsibility to establish and run its own telegraph line in Asia and additionally assist the Russians with operations, maintenance, technical assistance, and education. The naval officer Edouard Suenson was put in charge of the company's operations in the Far East. On his return to Denmark, in 1877, he was appointed CEO of the parent company in Copenhagen.

In the following years, the telegraph line expanded massively – both in Europe and in Asia. First, Oslo, London and Paris were covered. Later, operations took place along the coast of China ranging from Hong Kong to Shanghai and further into Japan, where the first telegraph station opened in Nagasaki in 1897. In addition to the telegraph line, telegraph stations and offices opened at several locations.

In 1897, negotiations began about a potential connection going from Scotland to the United States through the Faroe Islands, Iceland, and Greenland. In 1906, the cable was established, although without the final connection to the United States, which had to wait for almost 60 years to become a reality. When the transatlantic connection was finally established, however, it represented a remarkable expansion, which significantly facilitated communication between people around the world.

The beginning of the 20th century was characterized by several wars and disputes, which affected the company's operations. World War I and largely the Russian Revolution changed the map of Europe, but this only meant an increase in demand for telegraphy. Thus, the company succeeded in prolonging its concession agreement in 1921, signed by Lenin.

The 1920s and the early 1930s represented great decades for The Great Northern Telegraph Company as it had managed to acquire a reputation as being one of the leading international telecommunication companies in the world. The late 1930s, however, presented great challenges as competition from wireless telegraphy was becoming increasingly severe. In addition, World War II caused great damage to the telegraph lines around the world, which meant that in 1945 the company had only two lines left; the England-Faroes-Iceland line and the Sweden-Finland line. Although broken lines were repaired and re-established after the war, the company had to acknowledge that an era was over.

Thus, the new strategy was to focus on a broader segment by investing in various companies across sectors. This strategy was initiated in 1939 with the investment in the battery factory Hellesens. Over the following decades, The Great Northern Telegraph Company balanced between investing in the telecommunications industry and other industries. On the industry side, it invested in companies such as Lauritz Knudsen, which produced electrical goods, and in 1947, the radiotelephone production company Storno (a contraction of Store Nordiske (Great Northern)) was founded. Other acquisitions were Telematic, which produced telephones, Elmi, which produced measuring equipment, and Danavox, which produced hearing aids.

=== GN Store Nord since 1985 ===
In 1985, The Great Northern Telegraph Company changed its name to GN Store Nord (GN = Great Nordic) with the aim of creating a new group identity and organizing its businesses. In this process, all subsidiaries were renamed to include GN: GN Danavox, GN NetTest, GN Automatic, etc. A major change happened in 1991 when GN was assigned the attractive GMS concession from the national Danish telecommunication authorities. In March 1992, GN's new subsidiary Sonofon opened the first private mobile telephone network in Denmark. Although GN was not the only investor in Sonofon, it owned the majority of the shares. With the blossoming of the data communications and telephony industry, and under CEO Jørgen Lindegaard, GN was back on track and enjoyed big success in the late 1990s. In 2000, the company sold Sonofon to Norwegian telecom operator Telenor for a price of DKK 14,7 billion. A large amount was invested in the GN subsidiary NetTest, which had evolved from the former Elmi and considered GN's prospective core business. It was decided to let NetTest acquire the French company Photonetics for a price of DKK 9,1 billion. The optimistic view of the future was also reflected in the share price, which had increased fivefold in only one year, from September 1, 1999, to September 1, 2000. Same year the American Jabra Corporation was acquired. The focus and investment in NetTest, however, resulted in a serious downturn since GN had misjudged the market development of NetTest's products. In 2001, net profit ended at DKK -9,2 billion, followed by a share price decline equivalent to previous years' gains. Thereby major parts of the yield from Sonofon was lost within one year, and shareholders were raging in the media and at the annual general meeting.

The following years' turbulence led to the company selling most of its subsidiaries and leaving Tietgen's old headquarters in 1893 at Kongens Nytorv in Copenhagen. GN Store Nord's headquarter currently resides in Ballerup North of Copenhagen, Denmark. GN continued focusing on its two core businesses; hearing aids and headsets, produced by GN Hearing and GN Audio, respectively. On October 2, 2006, GN announced its decision to divest GN Hearing (formerly GN ReSound) and GN Otometrics (a company producing audio measuring equipment) to Swiss competitor Sonova (formerly known as Phonak). The deal, however, was annulled after being blocked by the German Cartel Office. After this, GN announced that it intended to keep the two companies but filed an appeal against the court ruling. The case is still pending.

The blocked deal, however, left GN challenged to the extreme with two underperforming businesses, a thin product pipeline, a heavy debt position, and facing a highly adverse macroeconomic environment. Nonetheless, with comprehensive restructuring and management efforts, the company managed to survive. Since then, GN has gradually fought its way back. In 2009, GN Audio (then GN Netcom) made a decision to globally market all its products under the same brand, Jabra (a company that GN had acquired in 2000). The purpose of consolidating all products under the same brand was to strengthen the company's position as the world's leading supplier of headsets. Today, GN Audio is a world leader in Unified Communications headsets, and within the last couple of years, the company has managed to be the first at introducing a number of innovative products on the market. In 2014, the company launched the world's first sports headset with a built-in heart rate monitor. In addition, a series of noise cancellation headsets with a concentration zone has been launched, which are specially designed to improve employees' ability to concentrate in noisy open offices. GN Hearing also got back on track. In 2010, the company launched the world's first hearing aid with 2.4 GHz technology – the new wireless technology was groundbreaking compared to the previous inductive technology. In 2014, GN Hearing changed the industry once more with the introduction of the world's first Made for iPhone hearing aid, which, based on the 2.4 GHz technology enables the streaming of sound directly from an iPhone without any body-worn devices.

In October 2016, GN Audio acquired VXi Corporation, the manufacturer of both the VXi and BlueParrott headset brands.

== Business ==
Today, the GN Group consists of GN Store Nord A/S, GN Hearing A/S, and GN Audio A/S. GN develops and manufactures intelligent hearing, audio, video, and gaming solutions. GN's offerings are marketed by the brands ReSound, Jabra, SteelSeries, Beltone, Interton, Danavox, and FalCom in more than 100 markets globally.

== Directors ==
(Incomplete)

- (1873–1908) Edouard Suenson
- (1908–1938) Kay Suenson
- (1938–1966) Bent Suenson
- (1985–2000) Christian Tillisch (GN Netcom)
- (1987–1993) Thomas Duer
- (2000–2003) Niels B. Christiansen (GN Netcom)
- (1995–2001) Jørgen Lindegaard
- (2001–2006) Jørn Kildegaard
- (1997–2008) Jesper Mailind (GN ReSound)
- (2006–2009) Toon Bouten (GN Netcom)
- (2008–2010) Mike Van der Wallen (GN ReSound)
- (2009–2013) Mogens Elsberg (GN Netcom)
- (2014–2015) Niels Svenningsen (GN Netcom)
- (2010–2014) Lars Viksmoen (GN ReSound)
- (2014–2018) Anders Hedegaard(GN ReSound/GN Hearing)
- (2018–2019) Jakob Gudbrand(GN ReSound / GN Hearing)
- (2019–2023) Gitte Pugholm Aabo (GN ReSound / GN Hearing)
- (2015–2023) René Svendsen-Tune (GN Netcom/GN Audio)
- (2023–present) Peter Karlstromer (Group CEO GN Audio / GN Hearing)
