= Ved Vesterport =

Historic townhouse in Copenhagen, Denmark

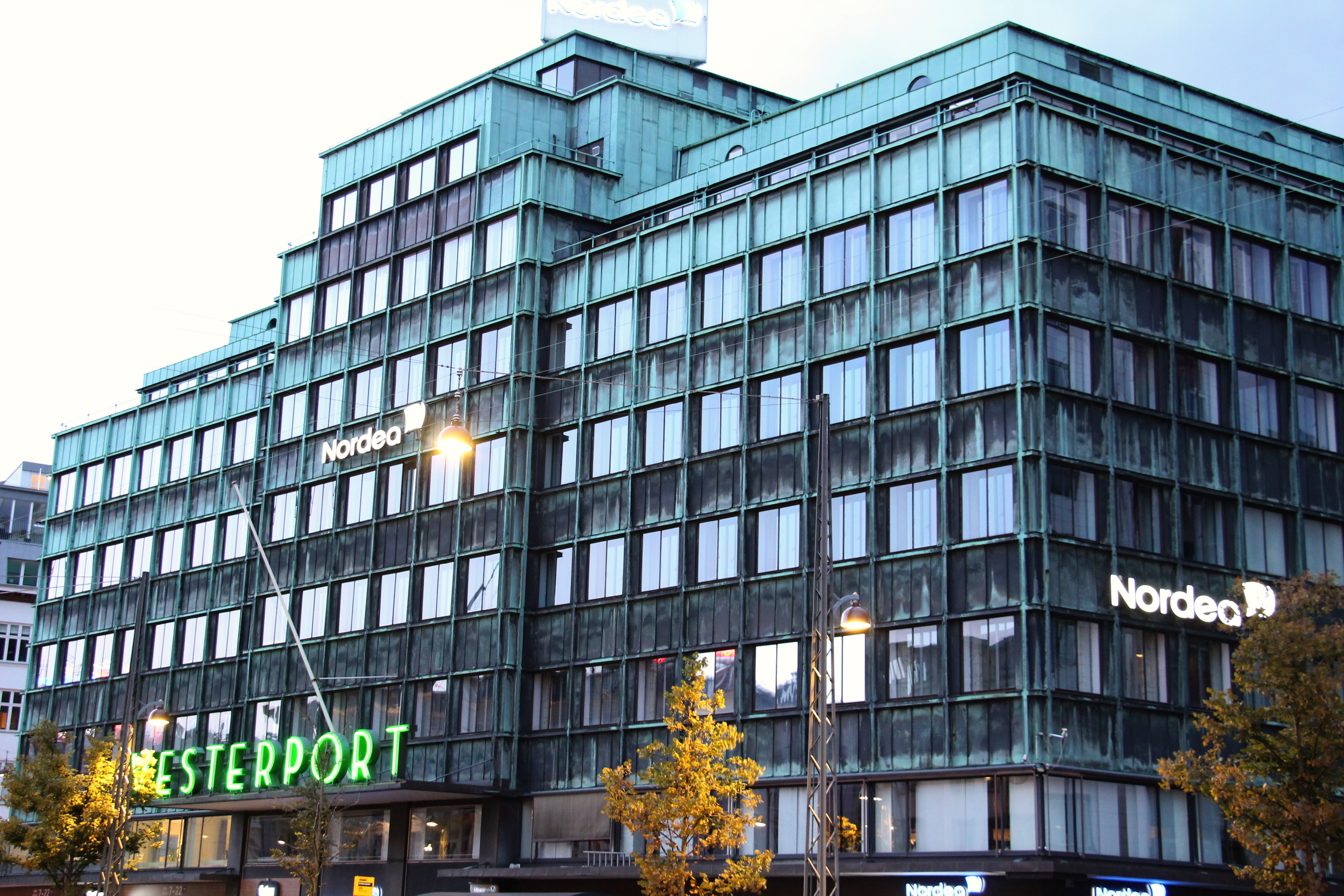
- Interactive map of the Ved Vesterport area

General information
- Location: Copenhagen, Denmark
- Coordinates: 55°40′27.12″N 12°33′40.32″E
- Construction started: 1930
- Completed: 1932

Design and construction
- Architects: Ole Falkentorp, Povl Baumann

Ved Vesterport, (lit.: "Near Vesterport"), or simply Vesterport, is a copper-clad, early-functionalist commercial building in central Copenhagen, Denmark. The building is situated on Vesterbrogade and is named for the Vesterport S-train station which is located at the back of the building. Designed by Ole Falkentorp in collaboration with Povl Baumann in 1930, Vesterport is regarded as the first truly modern commercial building in the city. Later, Falkentorp also designed the Hotel Astoria on the other side of the street.

Due to its unusual copper-clad facade, the building became colloquially known as the five øre, referring to the only Danish copper coin. Later, after the copper oxidized and acquired a blue patina, it became known simply as "The Copper Building" (Danish: Kobberhuset). The building includes an underground parking facility, retail shops at street level, the Restaurant Ritz on the top floor, and office spaces on the remaining floors. Its open-floor construction meant that it could be subdivided with non-bearing partition walls depending on the requirements of individual tenants.

== History ==
=== Background and construction ===
Copenhagen Central Station was moved to its current location in 1911. While construction of the new station was ongoing, the Liberty Memorial had to be dismantled. The plans for the area on the other side of Vesterbrogade was subject to prolonged debate. An architectural competition for the surroundings of the Liberty Column was held in 1910. Ole Falkentorp, who would later design the Vesterport building, submitted a proposal in collaboration with Carl Petersen. Their proposal comprised three buildings in a restrained, Neoclassical style: a low central building, with an inwardly curved facade, flanked by two taller ones. The competition was won by another proposal, created by the architects Holger Rasmussen and Egil Fischer in collaboration with the engineer Ove Kruse Nobel. Although the competition was won by Rasmussen, Fisher, and Nobel, none of the submitted proposals were ultimately realized.

Falkentorp and Petersen had both worked at DSB head architect Heinrich Wenck's design office. Povl Baumann, with whom Falkentorp would later design the Vesterport building, also previously worked at Wenck's office. The three architects were involved in the establishment of the Independent Association of Architects (Den Frie Arkitektforening), which had been created in opposition to the Danish Association of Architects.

Ole Falkentorp and Povl Baumann were ultimately charged with designing the site near central station that would become the Ved Vesterport building. It was planned as a mixed-use development with retail on the ground and mezzanine floors, a restaurant on the top floor, and multi-tenant office space on the central floors. Construction began in 1930 by a British consortium headed by Prudential plc.

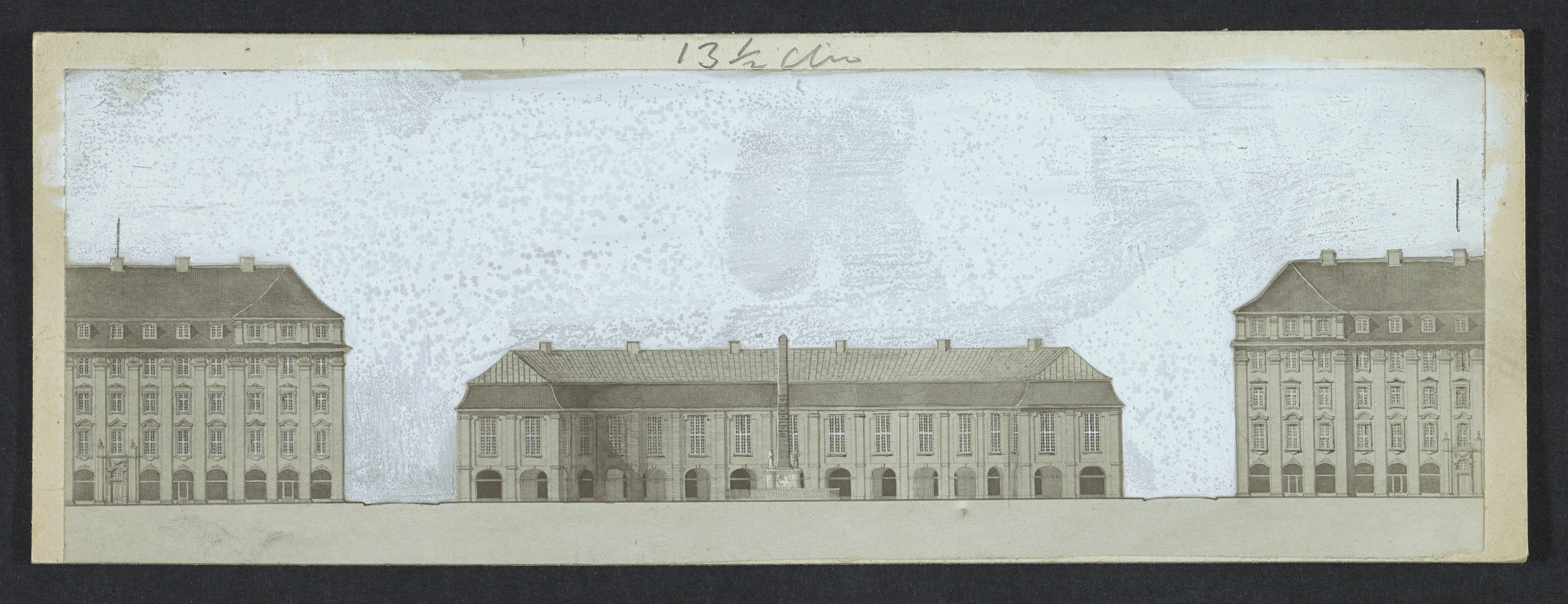
Carl Petersen's and Ole Falkentorp's 1910 proposal.

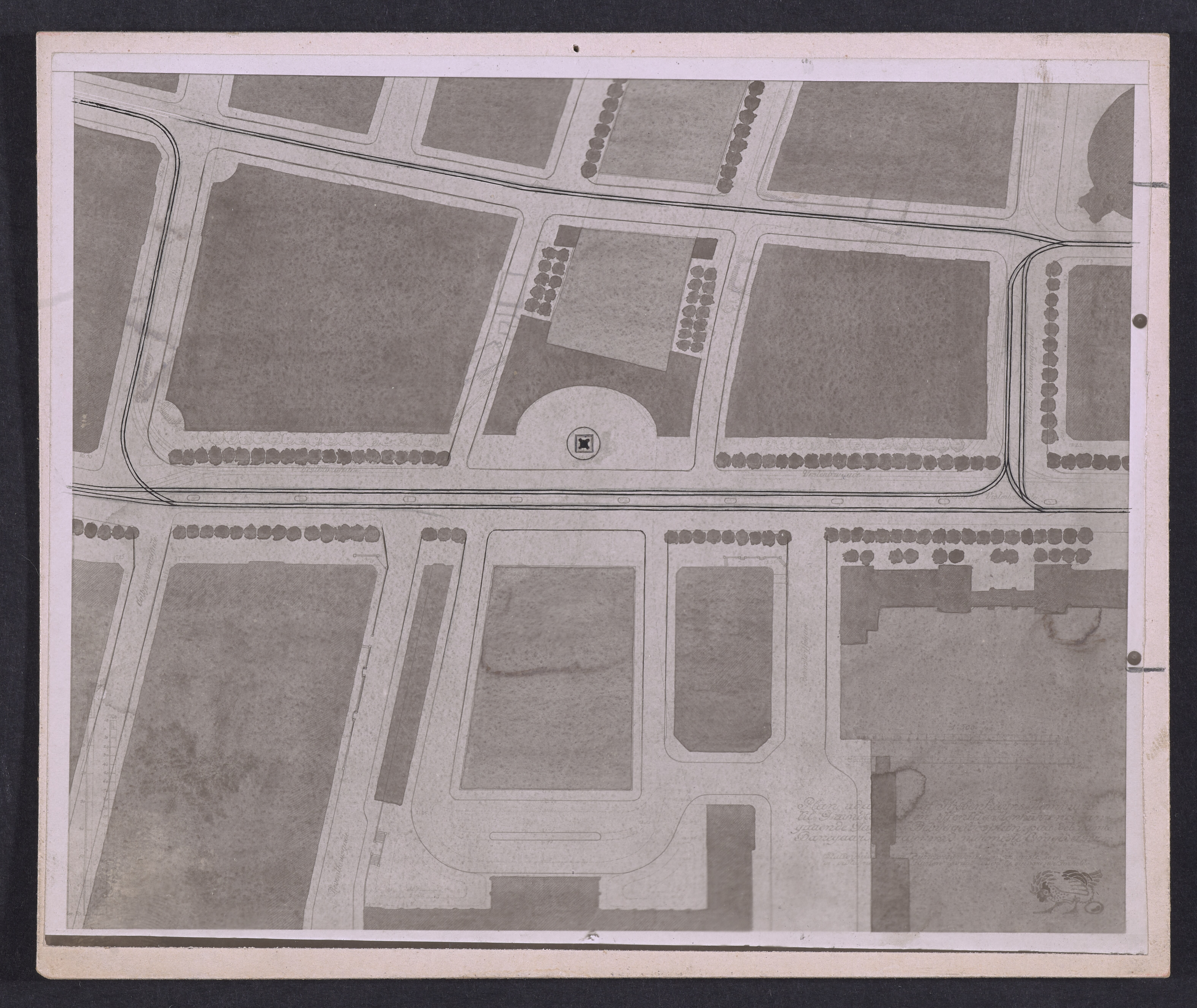
Petersen's and Falkentorp's 1910 proposal.

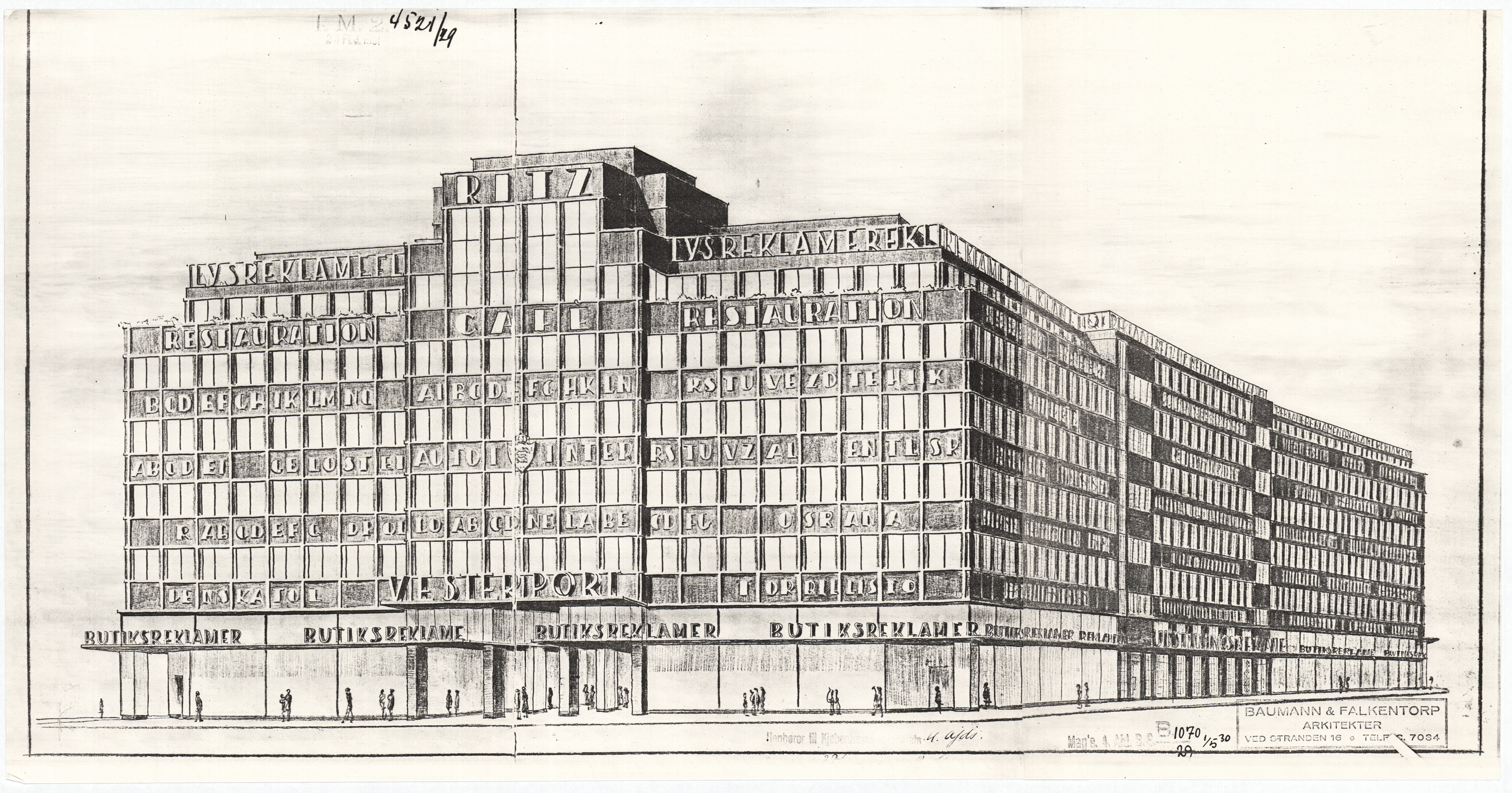
Drawing by Falkentorp of Ved Vesterport, 1930.

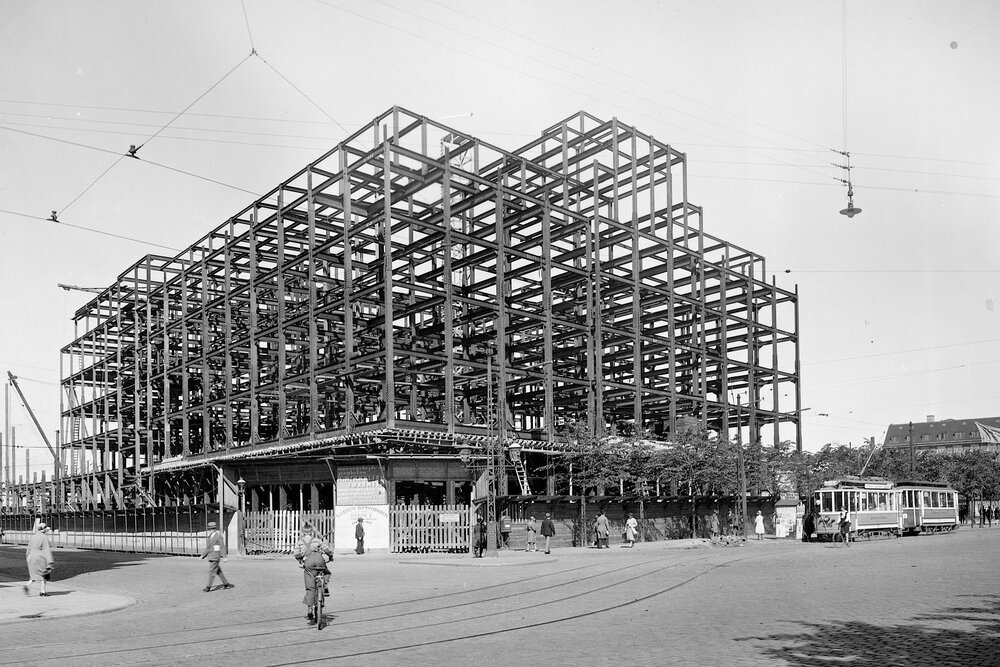
Ved Vesterport under construction, 1930.

=== Early tenants ===
Den Permanente, a two-storey design gallery opened on the ground floor, at the corner of Vesterbrogade and Trommesalen, on 5 December 1931. The opening of the design gallery was attended by prime minister Thorvald Stauning and trade minister Christopher Hauge. The influential design gallery was located in the building until 1871.

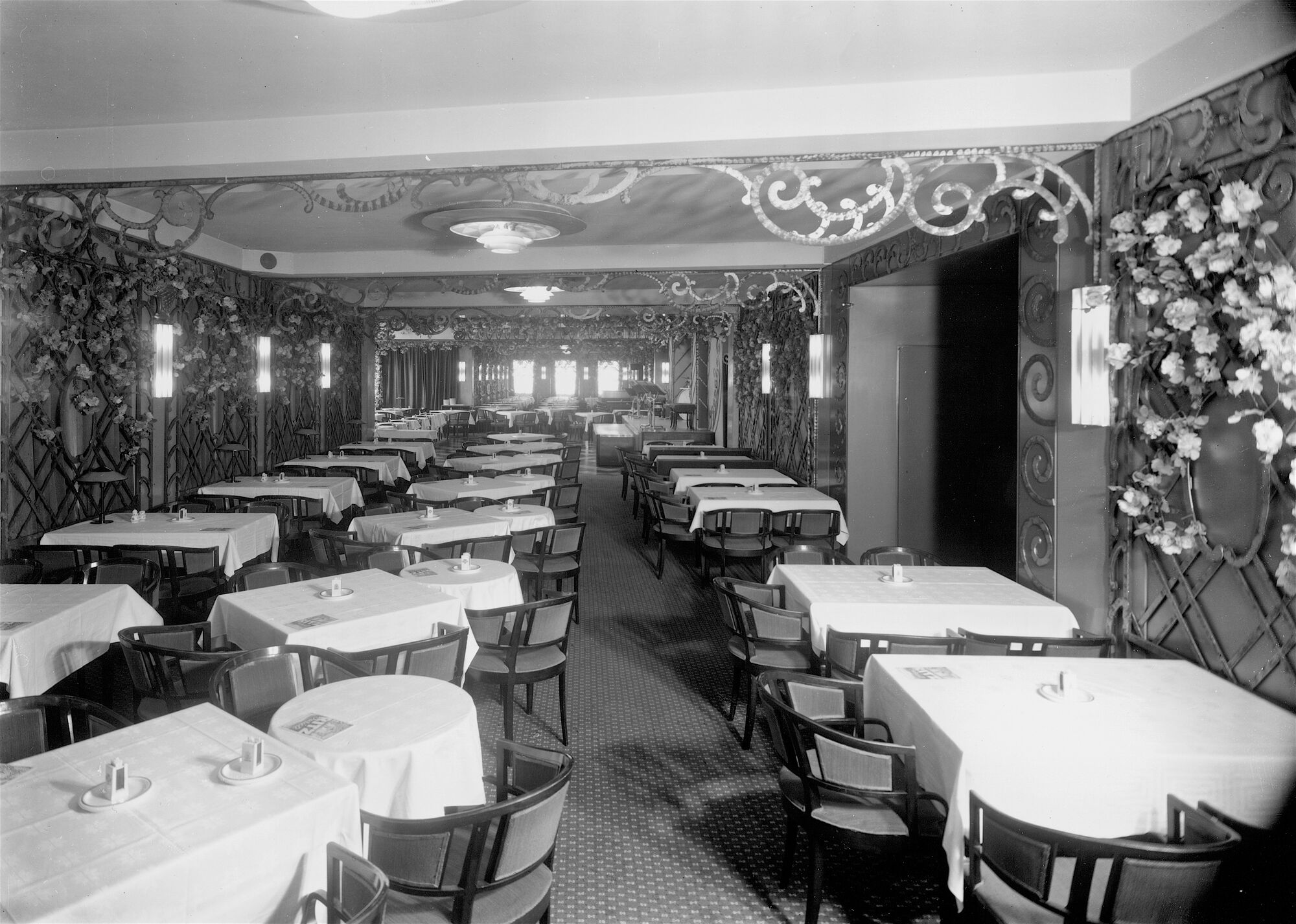
Restaurant Ritz, 1937.

The building had not yet been completed when Restaurant Ritz opened on the top floor in 1931. The largest room, with gilded walls and ceiling, had room for 200 dining guests. Its facilities included a billiard hall with 17 billiard tables. The building was formally inaugurated on 22 March 1932 with a galla dinner in Restaurant Ritz on the top floor. The dinner was attended by the British ambassador Thomas Hohler, Prudential's CEO and chairman from London, Falkentorp and some of the first tenants. In 1933, the Restaurant Ritz was taken over by Emil Hansen. In 1935, Hansen established Ritz-Varieté, which combined dining with live entertainment.

One of the tenants who attended the inaugural 1932 dinner was Peder Møller, a retailer of women's clothing, whose shop had been founded at Vesterbrogade 36 in 1914. Møller signed a lease for much of the ground floor premises. His shop opened later in the same year with more than six large display windows on street-level. It was taken over by Kaj Skou in 1936.

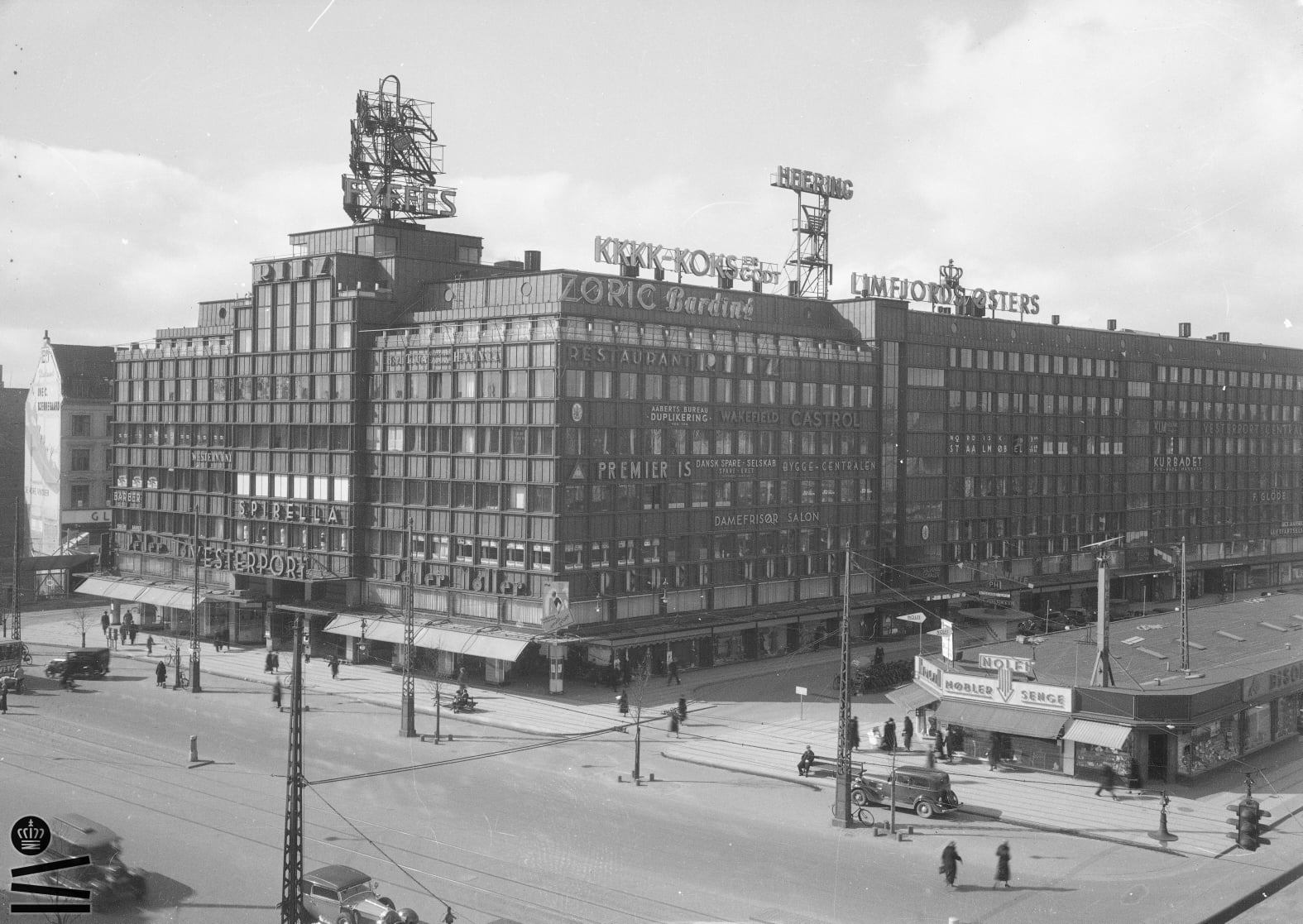
Ved Vesterport, c. 1932.

Dorvé Dancing Studio, which had been founded on Amagerbrogade in 1930, opened at Ved Vesterport in 1932. The studio was owned and operated by dancing instructor Cai Dorvé with the assistance of his sister, Ella Dorvé. They offered courses which included modern dance, step, ballet, fencing, and gymnastics.

The engineering company J. Stiirup & V. Prosch-Jensen was also based in the building at Vesterport No. 256. The company had been founded in 1917 and was involved in the construction of railways, port facilities, water locks, and other large-scale engineering projects across Denmark.

Among the other companies based at the building in 1932 was a chiropractic clinic, the sales office of the German Radio company G. Schaub Apparatebaum, and the company Odin Clorius. Odin Clorius had been founded as Brødrene Vlorius in 1802 by brothers Odin and Axel Clorius. Their factory was located on Vester Fælledvej.

=== World War II ===
During the German occupation of Denmark in World War II, part of the building was used by the occupying German forces. On 6 May 1945, when the Danish Brigade's 5th Battalion (aka Heacy Battalion) moved into Copenhagen, bound for nearby Halmtorvet, German forced opened fire from the floor below Restaurant Ritz as well as a number of other buildings in the area. The fire was returned with 37 mm guns. The building was subsequently secured by members of the resistance movement. The shooting lasted for approximately 30 minutes and resulted in 10 wounded members of the Danish battalion.

=== Later history ===
The savings bank Sparekassen SDS, which has since merged into Nordea, was later based in the building. In 2018, Ved Vesterport was refurbished for Nordea ownership by PLH Architects. Part of the building was subsequently once again operated as serviced offices.

== Architecture ==
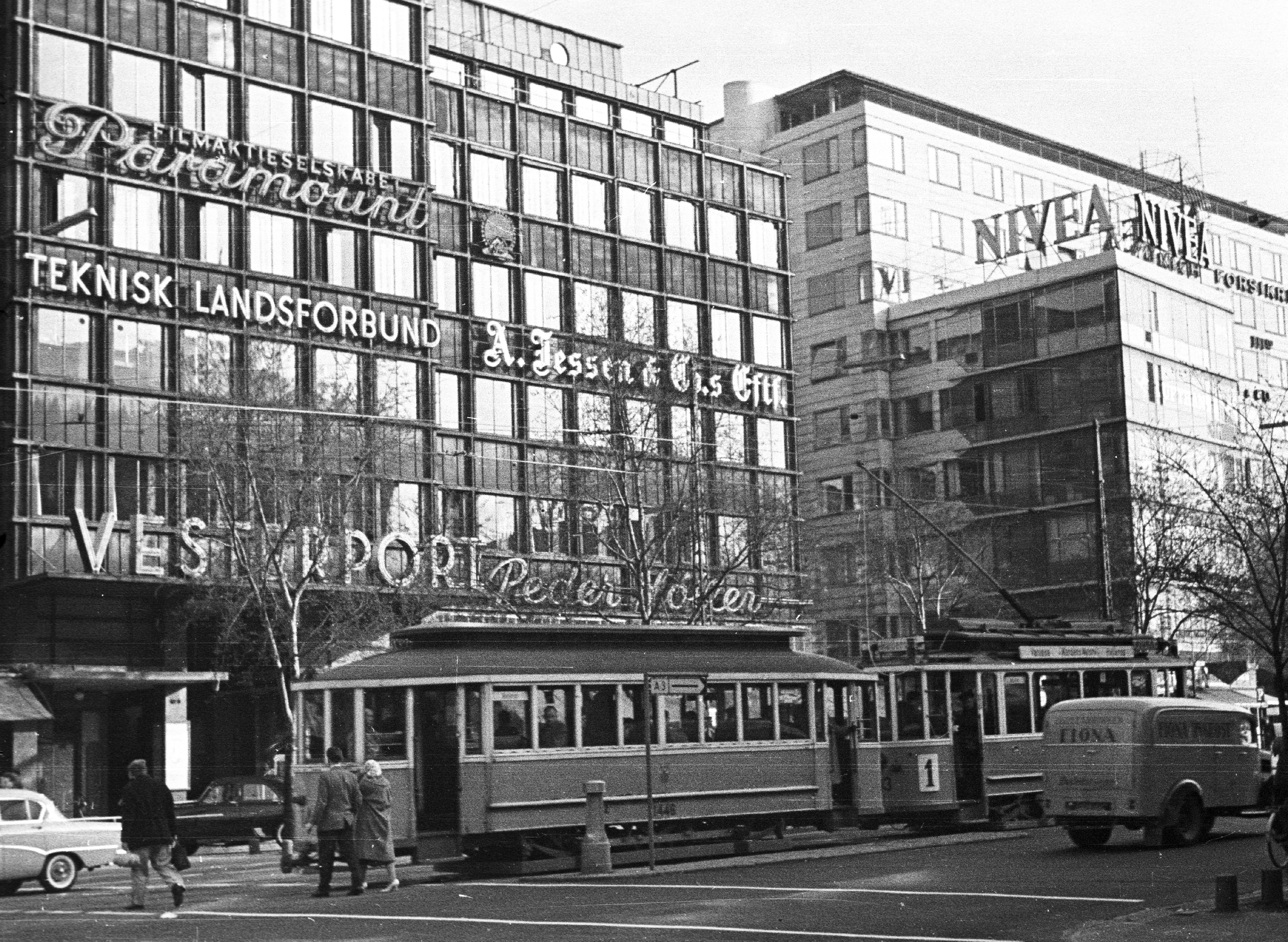
Ved Vesterport, 1961.

Ved Vesterport fills an entire city block from Vesterbrogade running back to Gammel Kongevej. The shape of the building is angled to occupy the entirety of the irregularly sized site. The building, which surrounds three service courtyards, has a total floor area of approximately 40,000 square meters. It has 10 floors, two of which are basement floors and one is a technical floor.

The building was the first steel-framed building in Copenhagen built with reinforced concrete floors. The majority of the facade is clad in copper panels, while the ground floor is finished with white columns and large glass shop windows. The strict symmetry of the principal facade and the tall central projection echo the Neoclassical style which had dominated Danish architecture in the previous decade.

The building was served by five lifts. One of them was an external lift which moved up and down the facade of the building in 20 seconds. Another strikingly modern feature of the building was the many neon signs mounted on the roof and facade of the building. They were all designed by Carl Grün, a Danish engineer who had worked for the General Electric Company in Schenectady. Another modern feature of the building was the underground parking facility, "Autoparken Vesterport", which had space for 125 cars. Valet parking, a service station, and a BP filling station were initially available on the site.
