= Reventlowsgade =

Street in Copenhagen

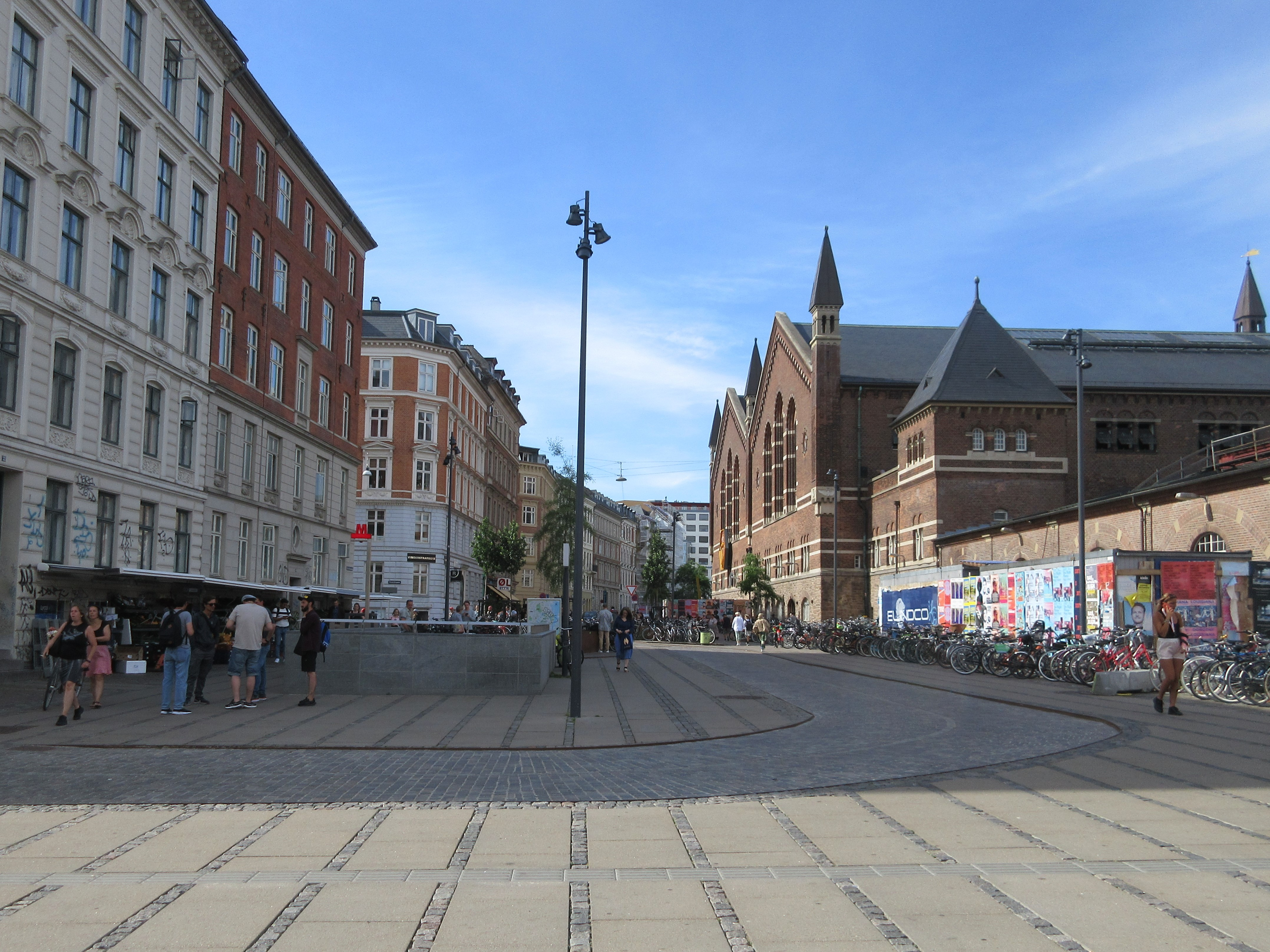
- Length: 225 m (738 ft)
- Location: Copenhagen, Denmark
- Quarter: Vesterbro
- Nearest metro station: Copenhagen Central Station
- Northwest end: Vesterbrogade
- Major junctions: Istedgade
- South end: Tietgensgade

Reventlowsgade is a street in the Vesterbro district of Copenhagen, Denmark, which follows the "Vesterbro side" of Copenhagen Central Station, between Vesterbrogade to the northwest and Tietgensgade to the southeast. One of the entrances to the Copenhagen Central Station City Circle Line metro station is located in the street. The street was refurbished in conjunction with the opening of the metro station, with new trees, seating and facilities for bicycle parking.

== History ==
=== Tømmergravsvej ===
Reventlowsgade was originally called Tømmerpladsvej (Lumberyard Road). The name was a reference to the extensive storage yards for timber and firewood that were locate at Kalvebod Beach and along the street. The 16 individual timber yards were owned by the city but leased by some of Copenhagen's largest timber merchants., including Andreas Collstrop, Jørgen Thomsen Bech, Lars Larsen and Carl Hieronimus Gustmeyer. Tømmergraved, a canal situated approximately where the city's Western Hospital was later built, provided access to the area by ship.

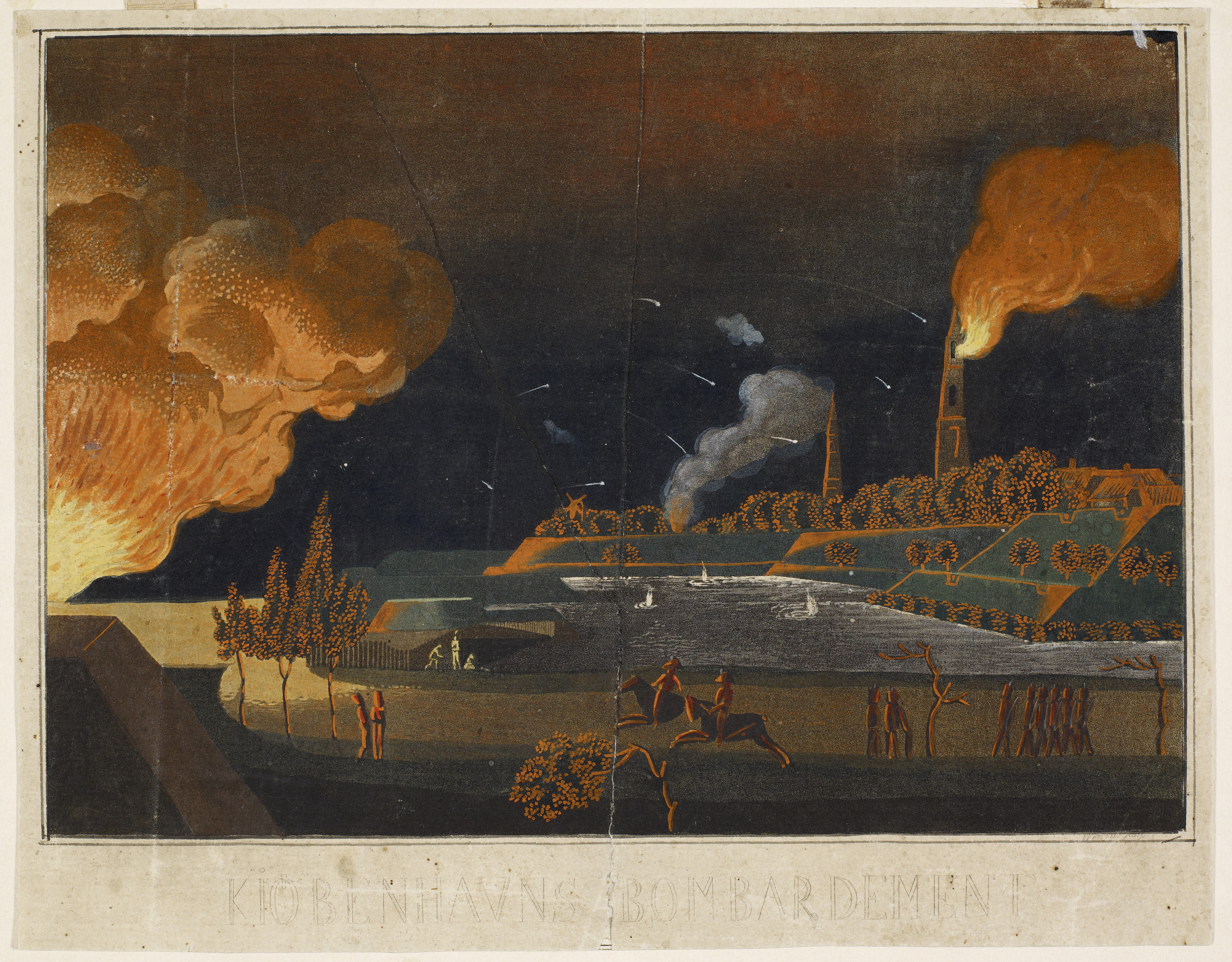
The British bombardment in 1807 depicted by Heinrich Wensler, a royal livjæger and copperprint engraver who was posted at Tømmerpladsvej during the assault.

The timber yards burned to the ground during the British bombardment of Copenhagen in 1807. Jørgen Bech alone suffered a loss of 30,000 Danish rigsdaler which was not covered by Kjøbenhavns Brandforsikring as the fire insurance did not cover force majeure such as war damage. As of 16 June 1809, the number of wholesale merchants in Copenhagen had increased to 173 (cf. list below).

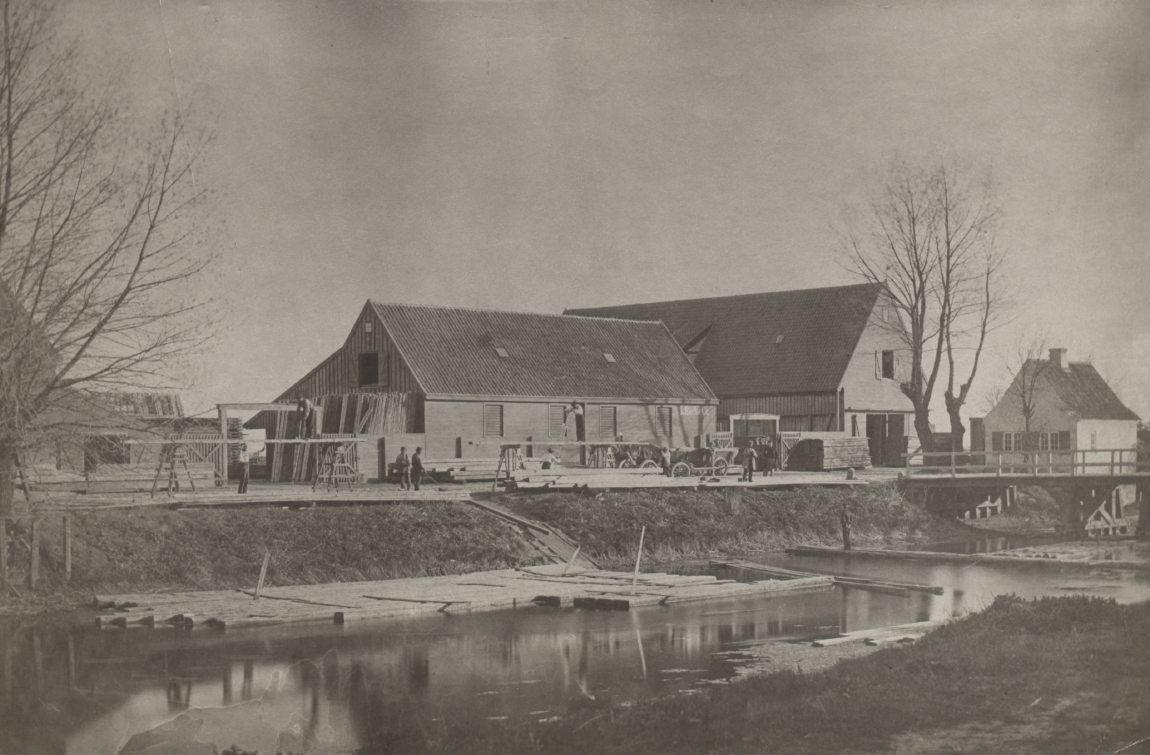
A building at the lumberyards, approximately where the corner of Reventlowsgade and Tietgensgade is today, c. 1865

The area continued to be used as timber yards throughout the 19th century. At the corner with Vesterbrogade stood a large, four-winged property (Vesterbrogade 9) owned by Andreas Collstrop and involved with the management of the lumberyards. The neighbouring building at No. 11 was owned by C. F. Hintze, a gardener, whose market gardens occupied most of the land between the lumberyards and Viktoriagade.

=== The new street ===
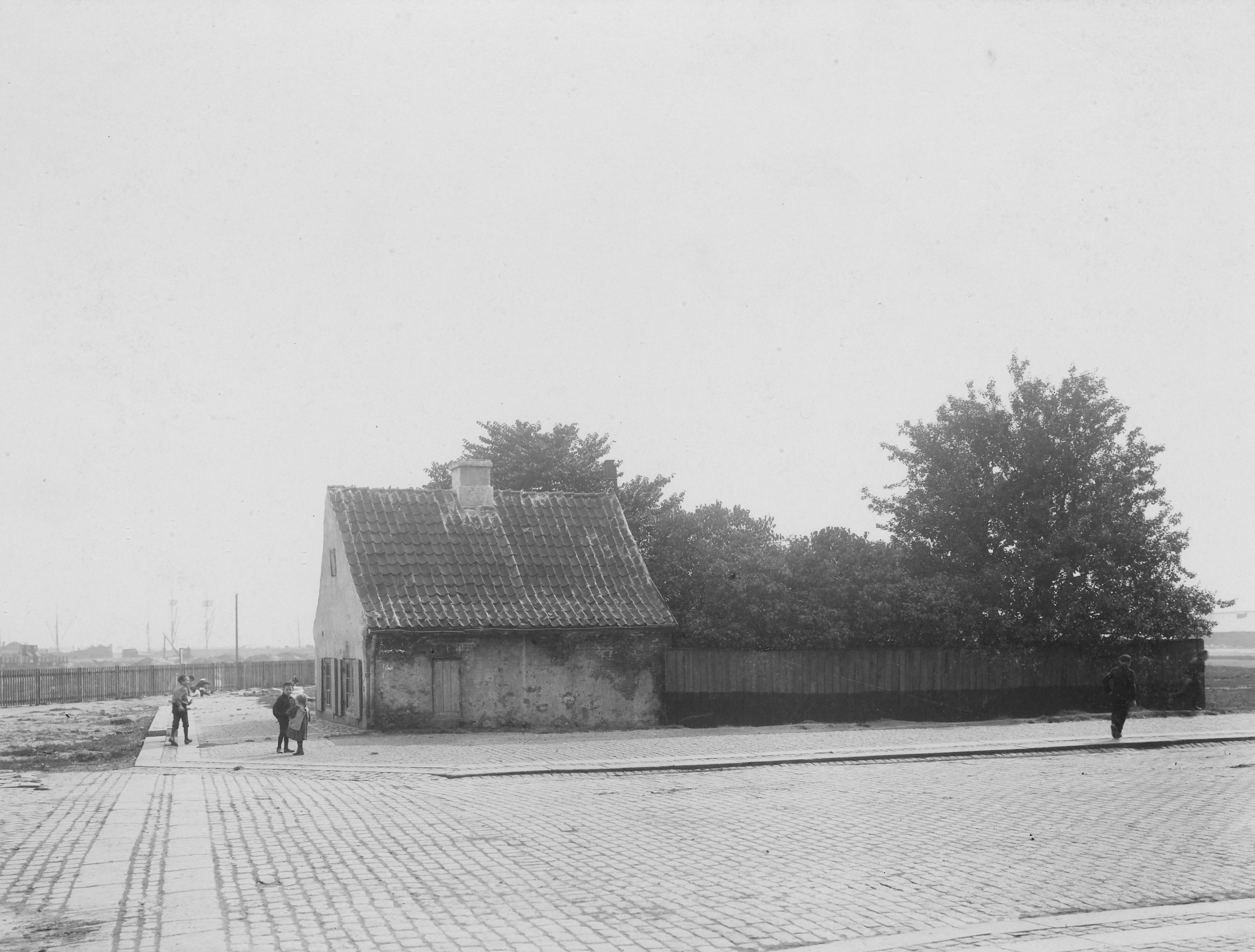
The guardhouse at the corner of Reventlowsgade and Rietgensgade photographed by Frederik Riise in around 1899.

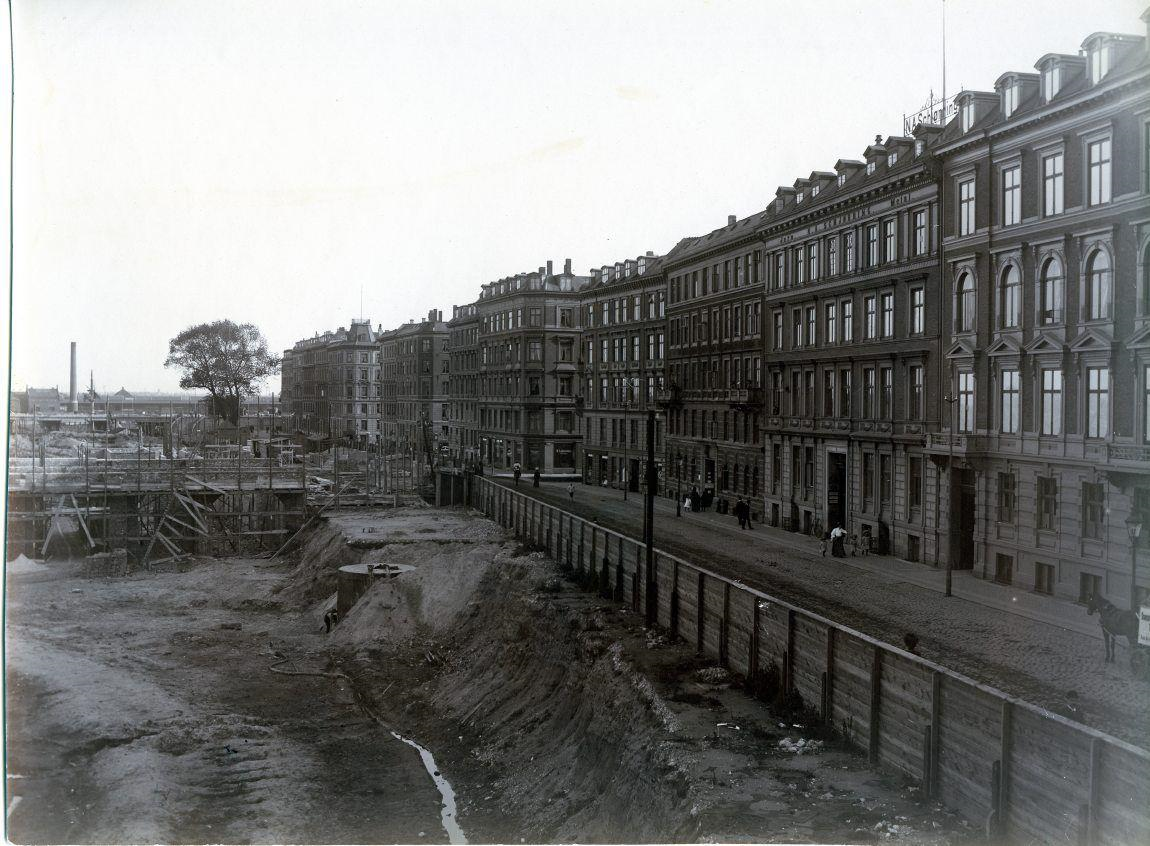
29 August 1907: Reventlowsgade with the new Central Station under construction.

In around 1880, it was finally decided to redevelop C. F. Hintze's market gardens. In 1881, Tømmerpladsvej and two other streets, one on each side, werereenamed Reventlowsgade, Bernstorffsgade and Colbjørnsensgade. The three streets were named after Andreas Peter Bernstorff, Christian Ditlev Frederik Reventlow and Christian Colbjørnsen, three of the driving forces behind the peasant reforms of the 1780s. The last timber yards were decommissioned in 1899. The last building associated with the timber yards to be demolished was a small guardhouse situated at the corner of Eeventlowsgade and Tietgensgade (then still known as Vestergade's extension).

The northwest side of the street was over the next years built up with typical five-storey buildings. A new Copenhagen Central Station opened on the other side of the street in 1911.

In 1915, Reventlovsgade 10 belonged to wholesale merchant K ai Quaade chjørring. Teventlovsgade 18 belonged to ship-owner Christian Valdemar Schou, and Reventlovsgade 22–24 belonged to master carpenter Hans Ferdinand æarsen.

The first section of Reventlowsgade was originally separated from Banegårdspladsen (th soace in front of the Central Station) by a wall. The extremely narrow site was later used for the construction of Hotel Terminus. (now Hotel Astoria).

=== 21st century ===
The street was refurbished in conjunction with the opening of the new City Circle Line metro station in 2019. In 2022, a plan was presented for partly opening up Copenhagen Central Station's facade towards the street with new cafés and shops. The project is expected to be completed by 2027.

== Notable buildings ==
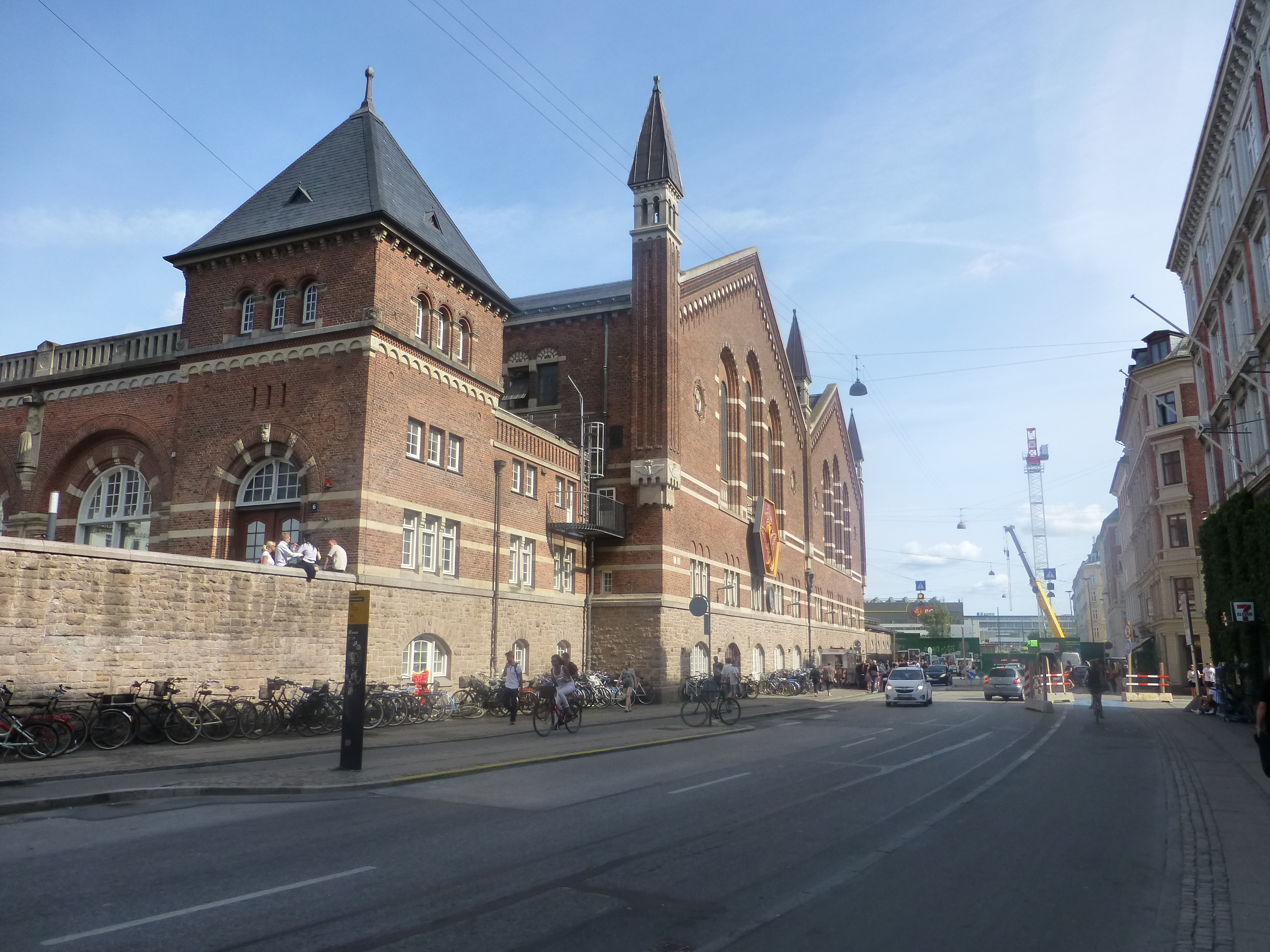
Copenhagen Central Station viewed from the other side of the street.

The National Romantic Copenhagen Central Station was designed by DSB head architect Heinrich Wenck. The building is constructed in red brick with granite rustication on the ground floor. The twin gables of the perpendicular main wing, with pinnacles at the corners, are flanked by two lower, square towers with pyramidical roofs. One of the gables features a DSC logo which acts as a point-de-vue as seen from Istedgade.

Grand Hotel (No. 2 (Vesterbrogade 9) opened at the corner with Vesterbrogade in 1890. The bar on the ground floor was originally called Regina Bar. It was formerly owned by Arp-Hansen Hotel Group but was sold to Maystar in 2017. Hotel Regina (No. 6) opened in the 1880s but was in the 1980s merged into Grand Hotel.

Hotel Astoria is built to a Functionalist design by Ole Falkentorp. It was a challenge to build on the just 10 metres wide site and the two upper floors are therefore wider than the ground floor.

Between the Central Station and the hotel building is a wall with a double stairway that affords access to the Stationspladsen public space in front of the Central Station's main entrance.

== Transport ==
An entrance to Copenhagen Central Station affords direct access to its Grand Hall. A separate entrance to the Copenhagen Metro station is also located in the street. It is served by the City Circle Line. An underground corridor provides a direct link between the concourse of the metro station and the platforms of the railway station.

== Cultural references ==
Hotel Regina (No. 6) was used as a location in the 1969 feature film Sjov i gaden.

In one of the opening scenes of the Academy Award and Cannes nominated 1961 comedy Harry and the Butler, Henning Moritzen as "Fyrst Igor" Jensen is seen trying to buy the shop at the corner of Teventlowsgade (No. 22) and Tietgensgade. In Pigen og pressefotografen (1963), Dirch Passer is evacuated via a fire ladder through a window in the same building. The same building is also used as a location in Alt på et bræt (1977).

== Notable people ==
- Christian August Broberg (1811–1886), merchant and politician, lived on the first floor at No. 8 in 1882 but moved to Nørre Farimagsgade 27 the following year.
- Rasmus Christiansen (painter) (1863–1940), painter and illustrator, lived on the 4th floor of No. 22 in 1892 – 1897,
- Knud Larsen (1867–1961), painter, lived at No. 4 in 1884–1890,
