= Westend, Copenhagen =

Street in Copenhagen, Denmark

Coordinates: 55.67167°N 12.55184°E

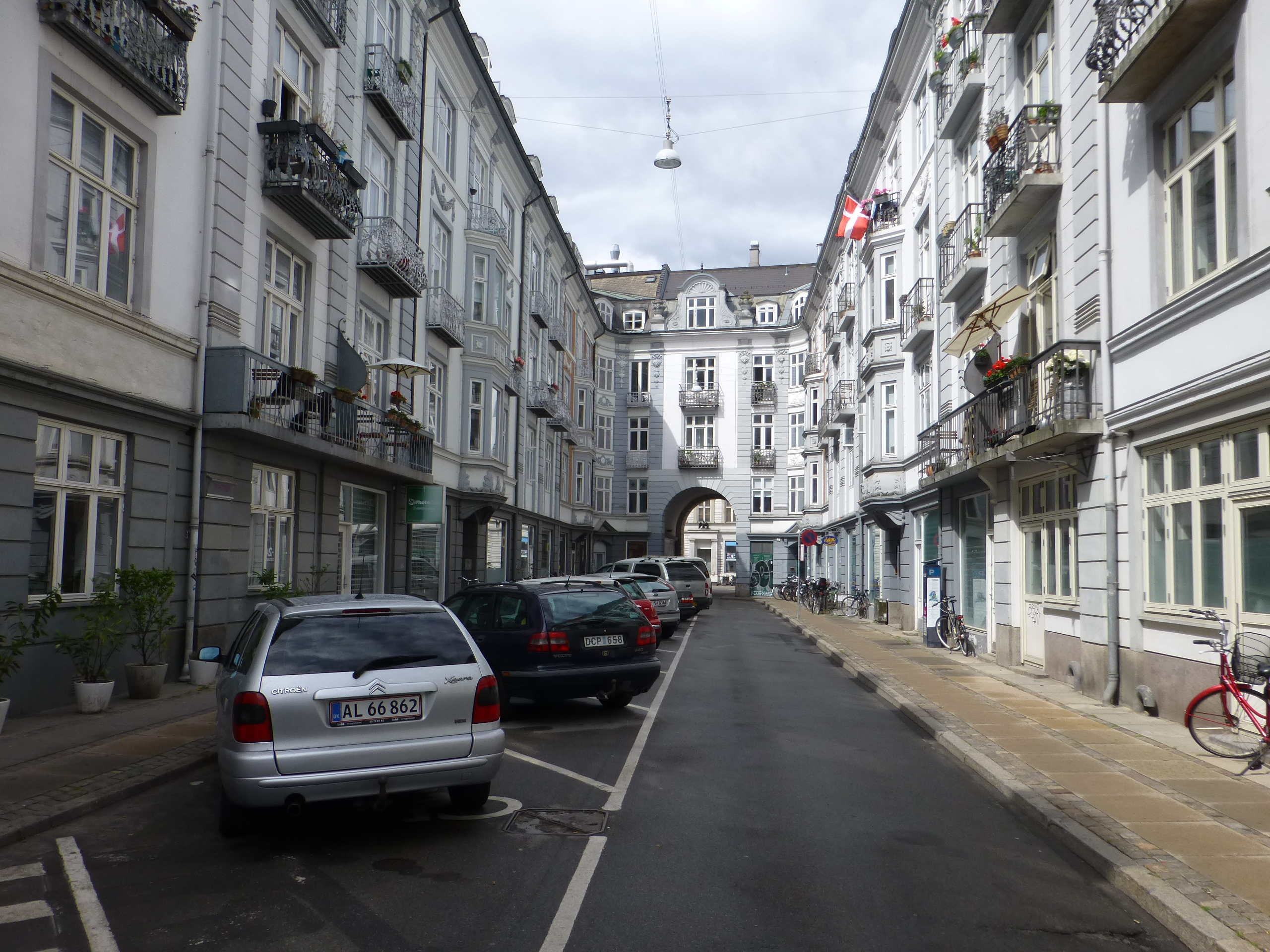
The northern part of the street with the gateway to Vesterbrogade

Westend is a street and Art Nouveau-style housing complex in the Vesterbro district of Copenhagen, Denmark. It links Vesterbrogade in the north with Mathæusgade and Otto Krabbes Plads in the south. It is accessed through a gateway in the building at Vesterbrogade 65–78 and is closed to car traffic in the other end.

== History ==
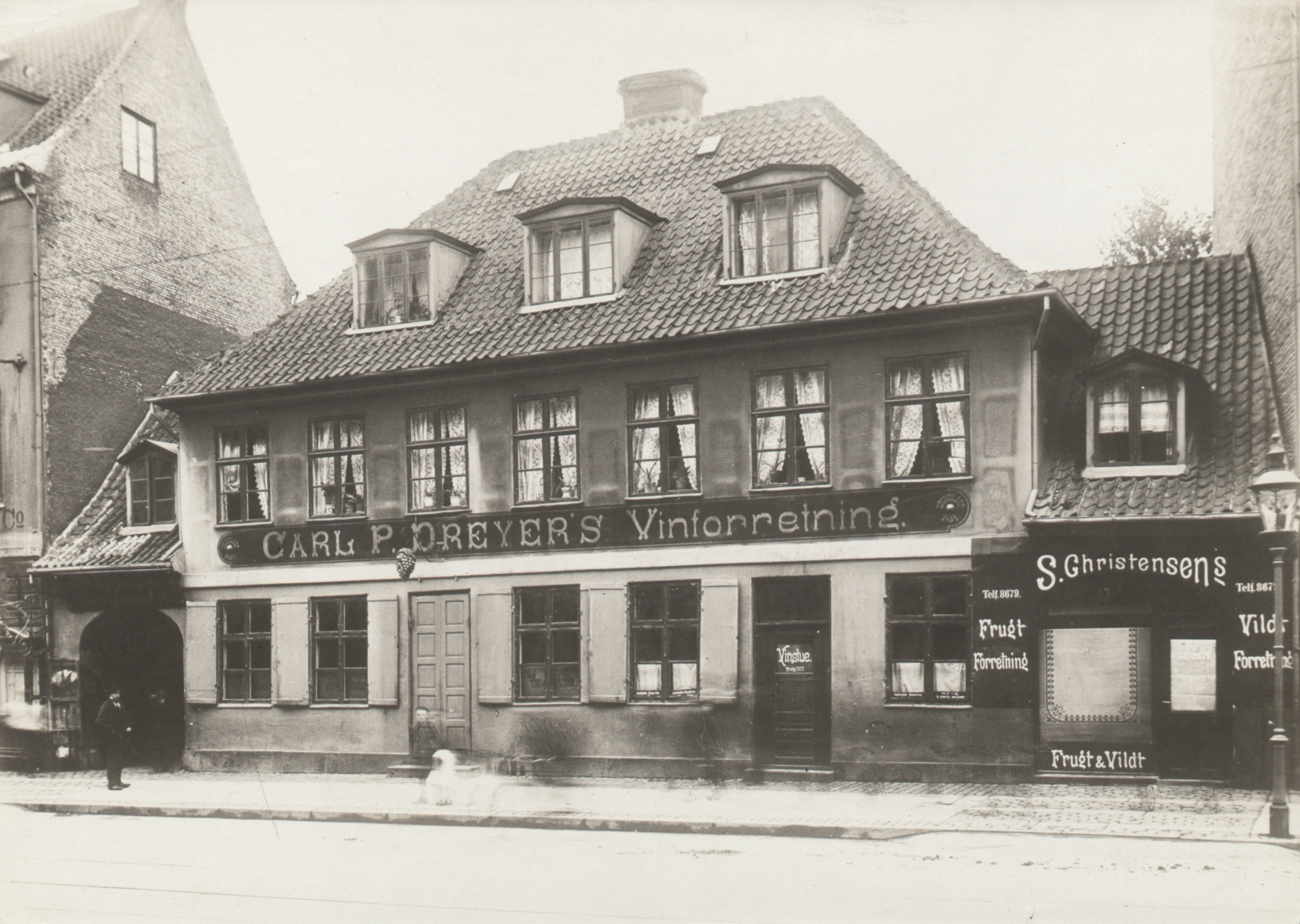
Carl P. Dreyers Vinhandel in 1902

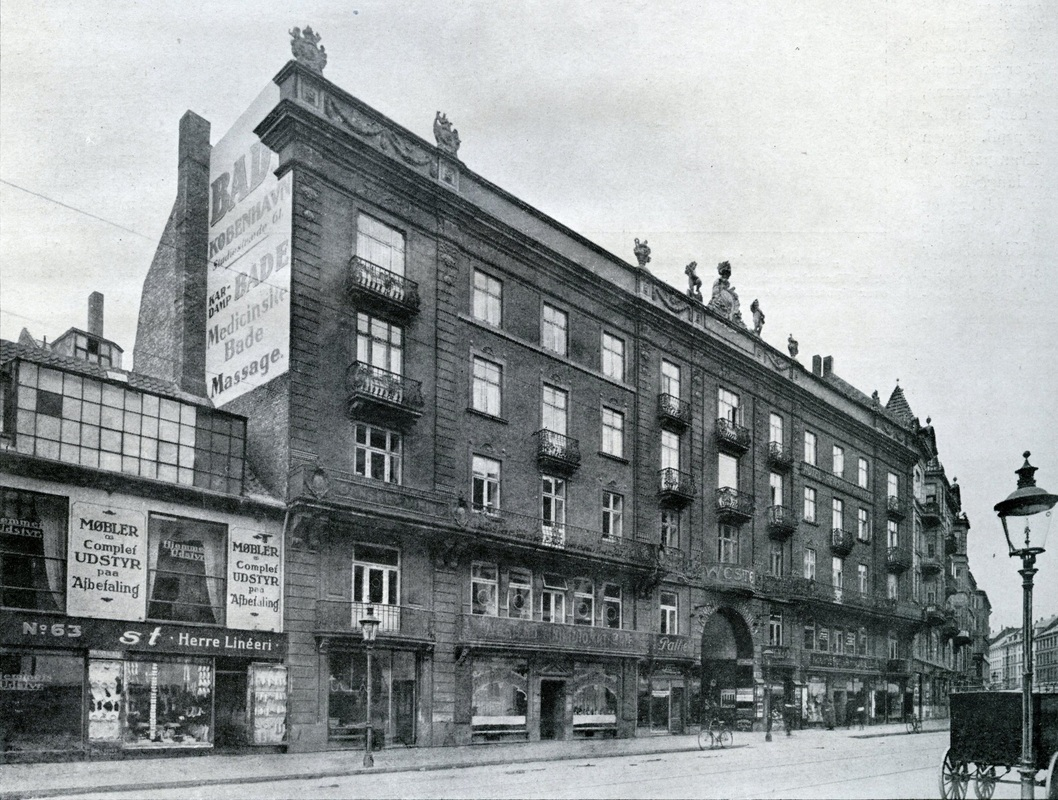
The Westend complex seen from Vesterbrogade in 1919

In the 19th century, Vesterbro was Copenhagen's principal entertainment district. Prostitution was legalized in 1866. On March 9, 1877, the Ministry of Justice issued a "Resolution About Police Control With Public Women" in Copenhagen, introducing a system where matrons were licensed to operate "public houses". The police was authorized to refer the public houses to specific streets, and Badevej became the principal brothel street in Vesterbro. The street was in 1886 renamed Knudsgade. In 1877, Copenhagen was home to a total of fifty licensed brothels with approximately 300 "public women". "Foreningen imod Lovbeskyttelse for Usædelighed", a branch of "La féderation britnniqve, Continentale et générale", was founded in 1894. Prostitutes were required to have individual addresses when brothels became illegal in 1901. A group of developers purchased a property further out on Vesterbrogade, with the intention of creating a private street where prostitutes could operate from individual apartments. Carl P. Dreyers Vinhandel, a wine shop, was then located on the site. Construction began in 1903 but the plans were stopped by the so-called October Act, which made prostitution illegal. The Westend complex became instead popular with actors and theatre people.

== Architecture ==
The Westend complex was designed by the architect Albert Jensen, who had previously worked for Ferdinand Meldahl and designed buildings such as the Magasin du Nord department store on Kongens Nytorv.

The building is designed in the Art Nouveau style with inspiration from Parisian architecture. Its most characteristic feature is the elaborate wrought iron balconies.

== Street art ==
The interior of the gateway at Vesterbrogade 76–67 has since 2010 featured changing works of street art as a result of a street art project entitled "Wild at Westend". A book documented the result of the project in 2012.

== Cultural references ==
Flamingo Bar (Westend 2) was used as a location in the 1961 drama film En blandt mange. Westend is the title of a 2007 novel by Jesper Bernt and Jeff Matthews.
