= Andreas Collstrop (1847–1933) =

Danish businessman (1847–1933)

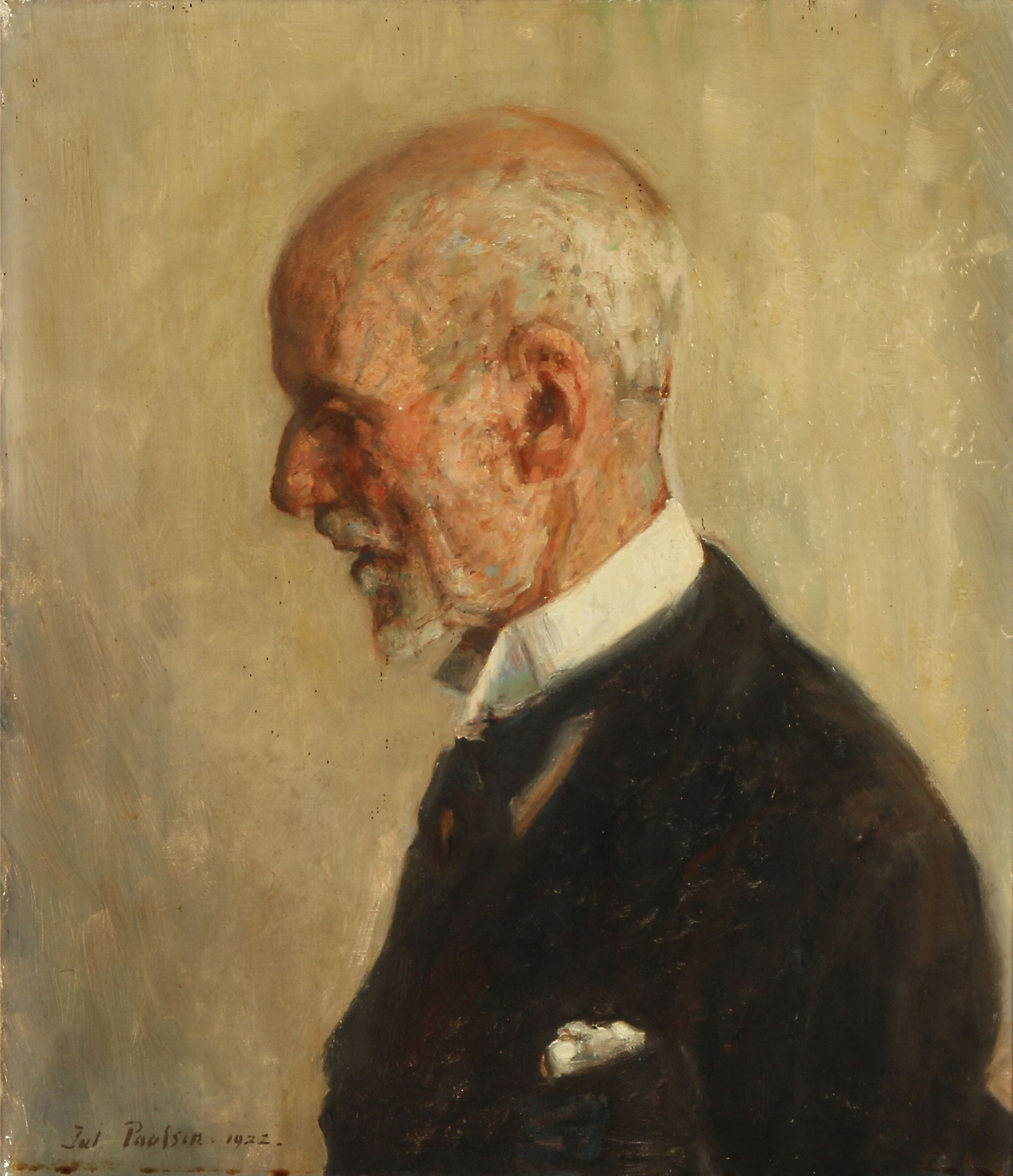
- Andreas Collstrop, painted by Julius Paulsen in 1922
- Born: 19 April 1847; Copenhagen, Denmark
- Died: 21 July 1933 (aged 86); Copenhagen, Denmark
- Occupation: BusinessmanIndustrialist
- Awards: 2nd-class Commander of the Dannebrog

Andreas Collstrop (19 April 1847 - 21 July 1933) was a Danish businessman. He inherited the timber company R. Collstrop (now Collstrop) in 1888 and opened Denmark's first wood preservation facility at Køge in 1889.

== Early life and education ==
Collstrop was born on 19 April 1847 in Copenhagen, the son of timber merchant Rudolph Collstrop (1812–77) and Henriette Claudine Martine Oppermann (1810–58). His father was the owner of R. Collstrop, a timber business with a history dating back to 1838. Collstrop received a commercial education first in J. P. Suhr & Søn and later in England.

== Career ==
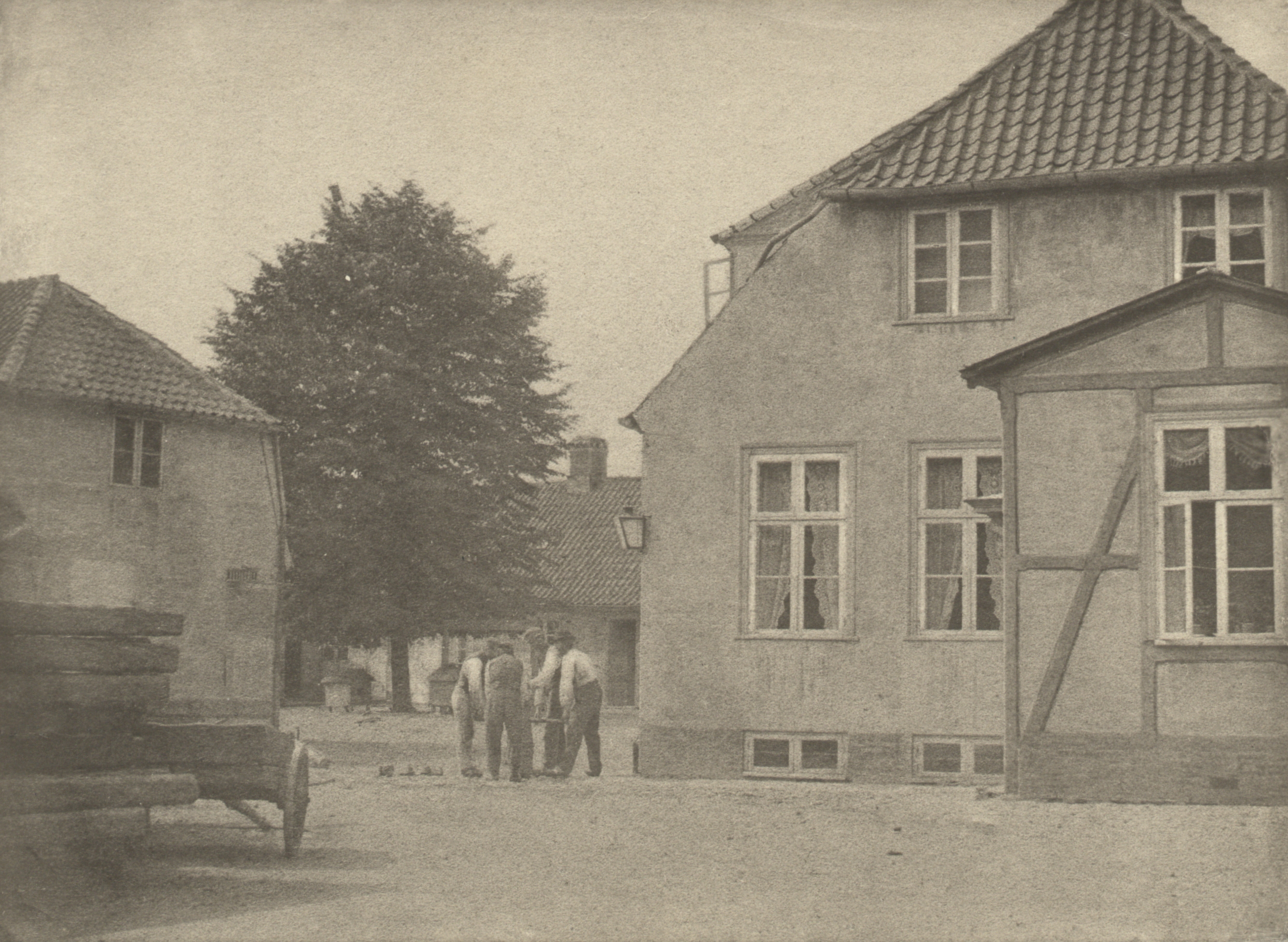
Collstrop's property at the corner of Vesterbrogade and Tømmerpladsvej in Copenhagen

Collstrop was licensed as a merchant in 1871. His father's death in 1877 left him as the sole over of the family business. After a few years he transformed the company from a timber retailer to a commodity broker and wholesale business on a scale that made it one of the largest and most reputable in the industry. He opened a tie mill at Køge in 1888 which was followed by Denmark's first wood preservation facility, Imprægneringsanstalten, the following year. The tie mill was later moved to Danzig. A second wood preservation facility opened at Horsens 1900.

His activities in Danzig made him move into forestry in Germany and Russia. In the 1890s, together with Julius Rutgers he established a timber preservation business in Russia which operated a total of eight factories in the southeastern part of the country. This part of his timber empire was lost at the outbreak of the Russian Revolution.

Part of the company was in around 1910 sold to Schmidt & Bloch and the remainder was 1914 converted into a limited company (aktieselskab) with Edvard Bülow as managing director. Collstrop remained chairman of the board until his death.

Collstrop was also a co-founder of Kjøbenhavns Flydedok & Skibsværft. He served on the board for many years. He was from 1914 also a board member of Den Danske Landmandsbank. He was therefore drawn into the Alberti Scandal in 1922 and ended up having to pay approximately DKK 1 million in compensation to the bank,

== Personal life and philanthropy ==
Collstrop married Fanny Emilie Christensen (20 August 1853 - 26 March 1883), a daughter of clockmaker Johan Peter C. (1803–84) and Ida Sophie Emilie Møller (1831–98), on 8 October 1878.

He is one of the businessmen depicted in Peder Severin Krøyer's monumental 1895 group portrait painting From Copenhagen Stock Exchange in Børsen. He was created a 2-class Commander of the Order of the Dannebrog in 1929. He owned the country house Villa Lundehave on Nordre Strandvej at Helsingør. The house was by testament of 1925 converted into "Comstrop's Gome for a Danish Scientist" together with a capital of DKK 300,000. The first scientist to reside in the house was the linguist Otto Jespersen from 1934. A donation from Collstrop made it possible to renovate the park at Marienlyst Castle in 1919-20.
