= Albert Jensen =

Danish architect

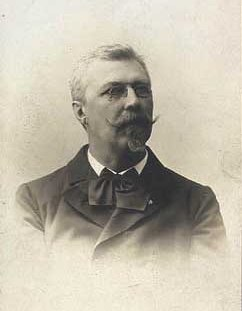
- Albert Jensen
- Born: 25 December 1847; Frederikssund, Copenhagen
- Died: 26 June 1913 (aged 65); Frederiksberg, Copenhagen
- Education: Royal Danish Academy of Fine Arts
- Occupation: Architect
- Children: Ole Falkentorp
- Buildings: Magasin du Nord

Signature
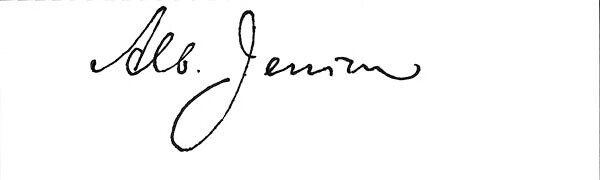

Albert Jensen (25 December 1847 – 26 June 1913) was a Danish architect. He collaborated with Ferdinand Meldahl on several projects, including the completion of Marble Church in Copenhagen and Charlottenborg Exhibition Hall. He also designed the Magasin du Nord department store on Kongens Nytorv.

== Early life and education ==
Albert Jensen was born in 1847, the son of merchant Anders Jensen and Anne née Jørgensen. After his confirmation, he was sent to Copenhagen where he graduated from the Technical Institute in 1863. He was accepted into the Architecture School of the Royal Danish Academy of Fine Arts in October 1864 from where he graduated in 1879. He won the Academy's small gold medal in 1874 and its large gold medal in 1876. The latter was accompanied by a travel scholarship which sent him abroad for two and a half years.

== Career ==
After his graduation from the Academy, Jensen worked for Johan Henrik Nebelong and later Ferdinand Meldahl and Ludvig Fenger. His first important works were the completion of the Frederik's Church (The Marble Church) and Charlottenborg's new Exhibition Hall in collaboration with Meldahl. Under Meldahl's supervision, he also served as executing architect on the Russian Alexander Nevsky Church according to a design by the Russian architect David Grimm. Jensen and Meldahl also collaborated on the rebuilding of Trolleholm and Trollenäs manors in Scania. Later works include the Magasin du Nord department store on Kongens Nytorv.

Jensen was an assistant at the Academy's school of architecture from 1879 until 1899. He became a member of the Academy in 1883 and of its governing body from 1890 until 1911. He was Royal Building Inspector from 1902 until 1912.

He was chairman of the Architects' Association of Denmark and instrumental in the foundation of its magazine Arkitekten.

== Private life ==
Albert Jensen married Caroline Sophie Nebelong, daughter of Niels Sigfred Nebelong, on 28 November 1874 in Copenhagen. Their son, Ole Falkentorp, was also an architect.

== List of works ==
- Frederik's Church (The Marble Church), Copenhagen (1875–94, with Ferdinand Meldahl)
- Charlottenborg Exhibition Hall, Copenhagen (1880–83, partly with Ferdinand Meldahl, listed)
- Trolleholm Castle, Scania, Sweden (1887–89, with Meldahl)
- Trollenäs Castle, Scania, Sweden (1891–93, with Meldahl)
- Niels Brock School, 18 Sankt Annæ Plads/1-3 Ny Toldbodgade (1890)
- DFDS Head Office, 26-28 Sankt Annæ Plads/7 Kvæsthusgade (1891)
- Frilagerbygningen, Nordre Toldbod (1891–94, demolished in 1973)
- Magasin du Nord, Kongens Nytorv, Copenhagen (1893–94, with Henri Glæsel)
- 9B Vesterbrogade, Copenhagen (1901)
- Westend, Vesterbrogade 65-67, Copenhagen (1903)
- Posthus i Charlottenlund (1905)
- New school building, Nykøbing Cathedral School i Nykøbing Falster (1906)
- Grøndalshuset, Charlottenlund Skov (1907)
- G. A. Hagemanns Kollegium, 10 Kristianiagade, København (1908)
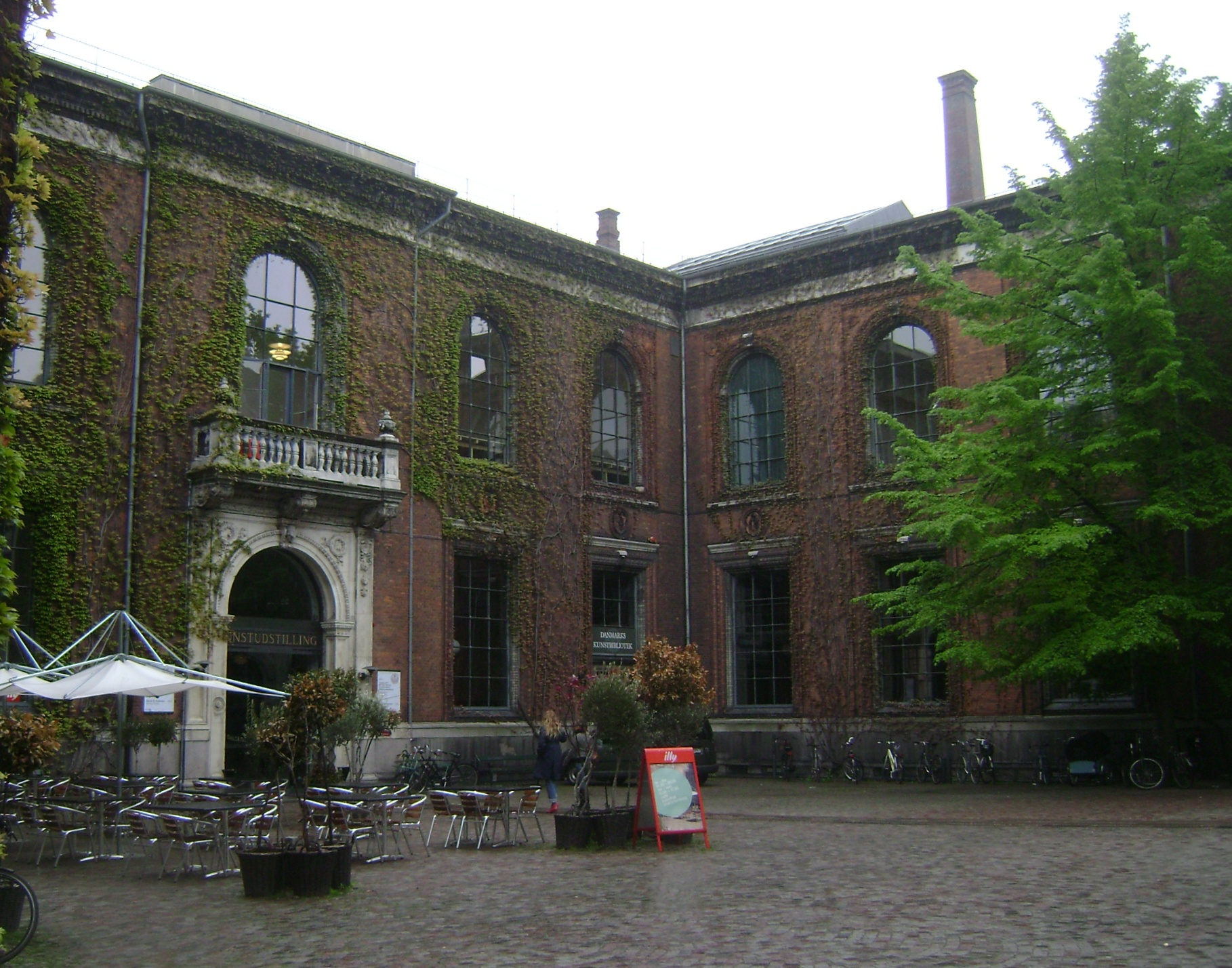
Charlottenborg Exhibition Hall

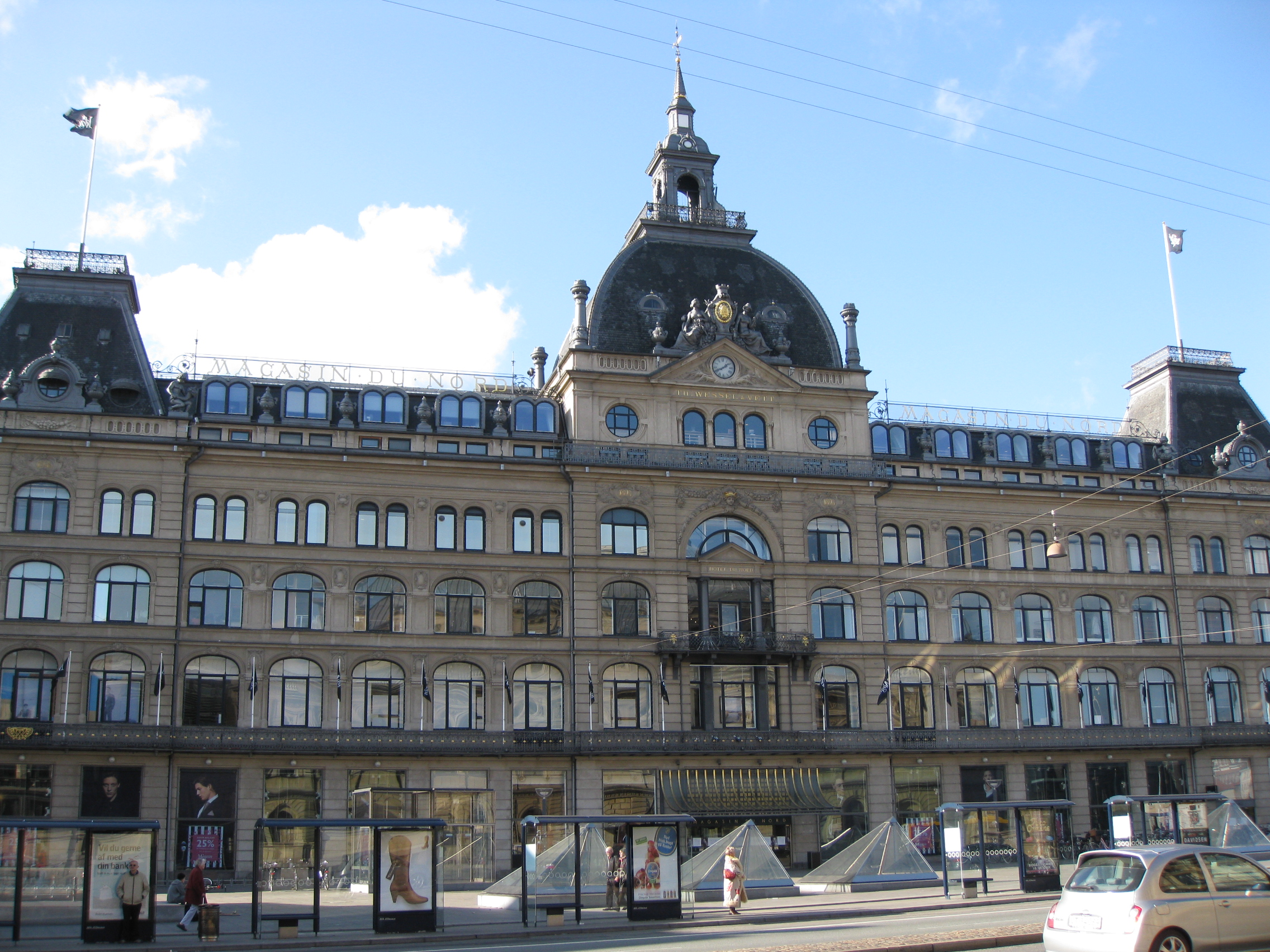
Magasin du Nord

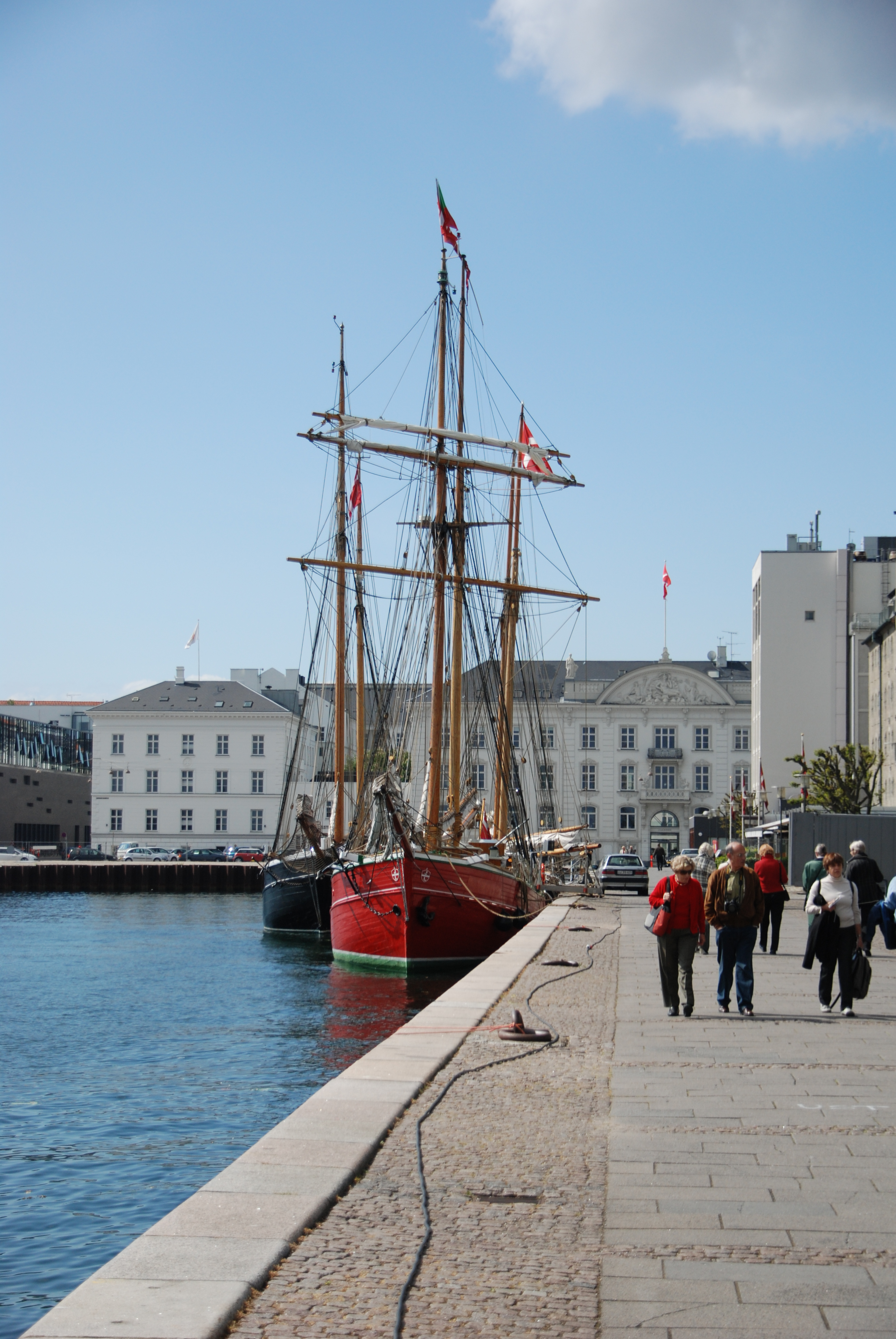
DFDS's former head office
