= Hotel Astoria (Copenhagen) =

Hotel in Denmark

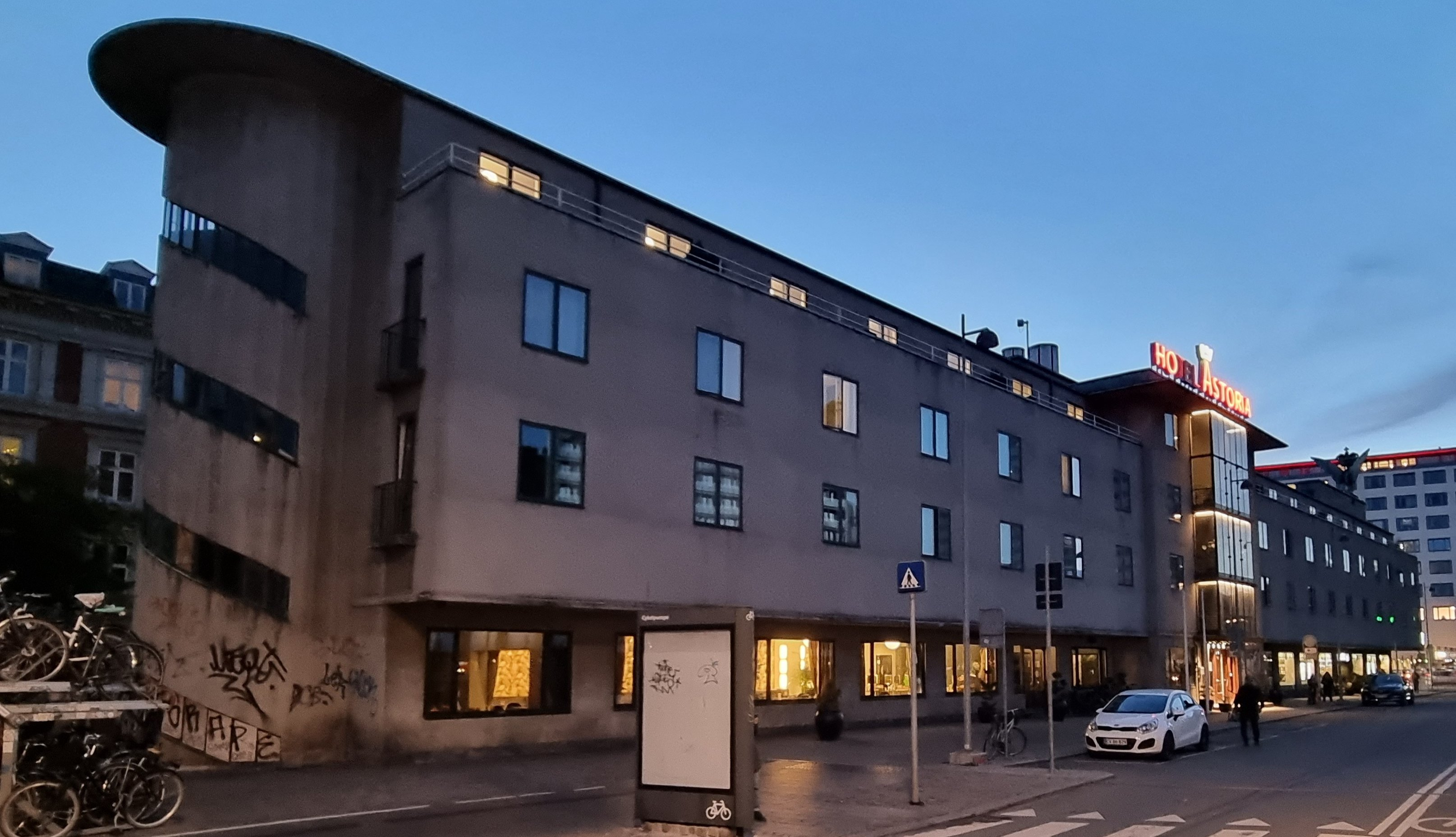
- Interactive map of the Hotel Astoria area

General information
- Location: Copenhagen, Denmark
- Coordinates: 55°40′24″N 12°33′47″E
- Opening: 1935; 91 years ago
- Owner: CIC Hospitality

Technical details
- Floor count: 3

Design and construction
- Architect: Ole Falkentorp

Other information
- Number of rooms: 94

Website
- [www.hotelastoria.dk / Hotel web site]

Hotel Astoria is a design hotel located next to the Central Station in Copenhagen, Denmark. Constructed in 1935 to designs by Ole Falkentorp, it is an early example of Functionalist architecture in Denmark. The hotel consists of a long slender wing forming a barrier between the urban space in front of the main entrance to the Central Station, which partly opens to the underground rail lines, and Reventlowsgade, the street on the Vesterbro side of the station. An example of architecture parlante, the building is intended to resemble a steam locomotive, It was listed in the Danish registry of protected buildings and places in 2019.

== History ==
=== 20th century ===
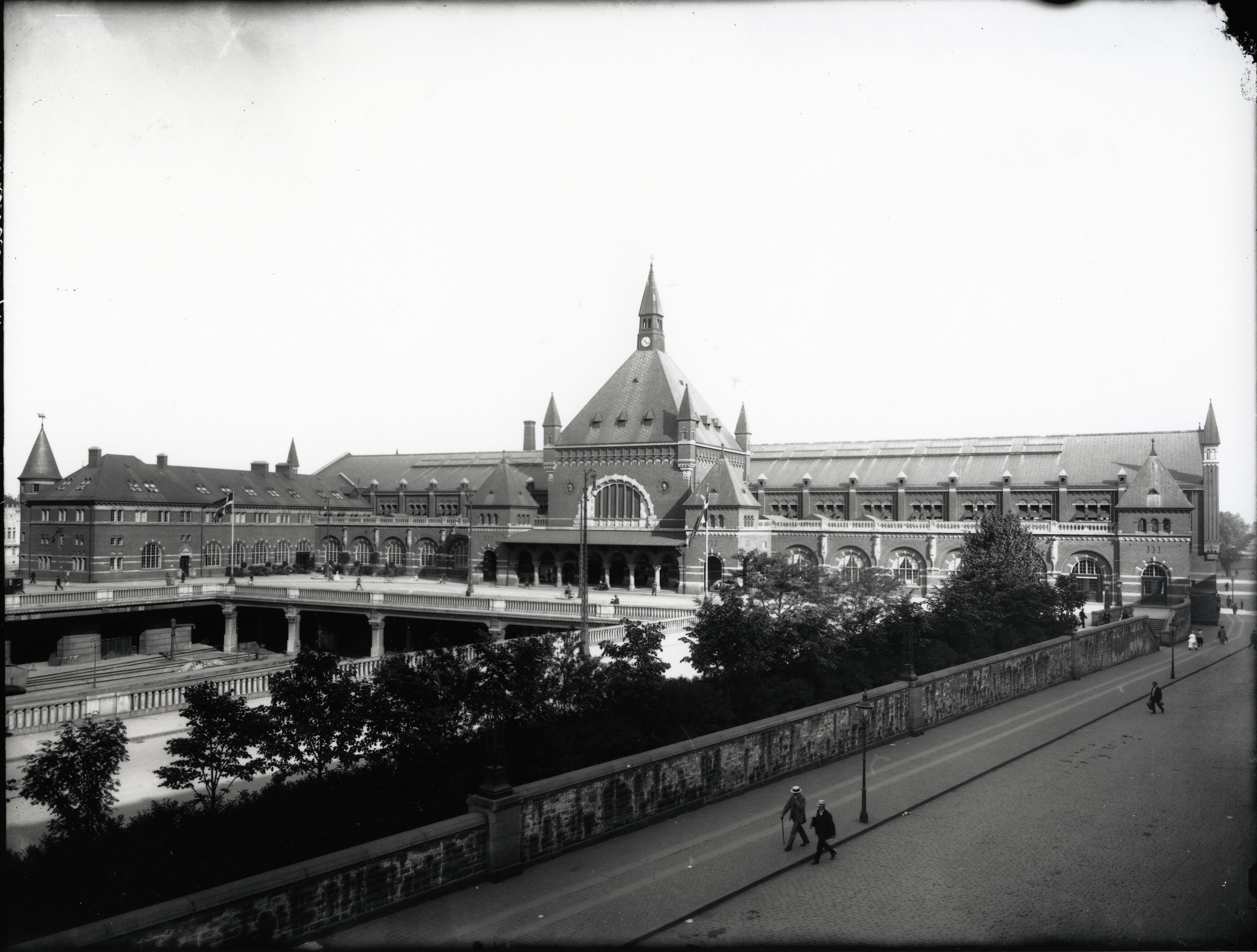
The site photographed by Peter Elfelt in 1920.

In 1881, Tømmerpladsvej was renamed Reventlowsgade. The new Copenhagen Central Station was inaugurated on the northeast side of the street in 1908. The first section of Reventlowsgade was initially separated from Bangegårdspladsen (the space in front of the new central station) by a wall. It was later decided to use the extremely narrow site for the construction of a new railway hotel.

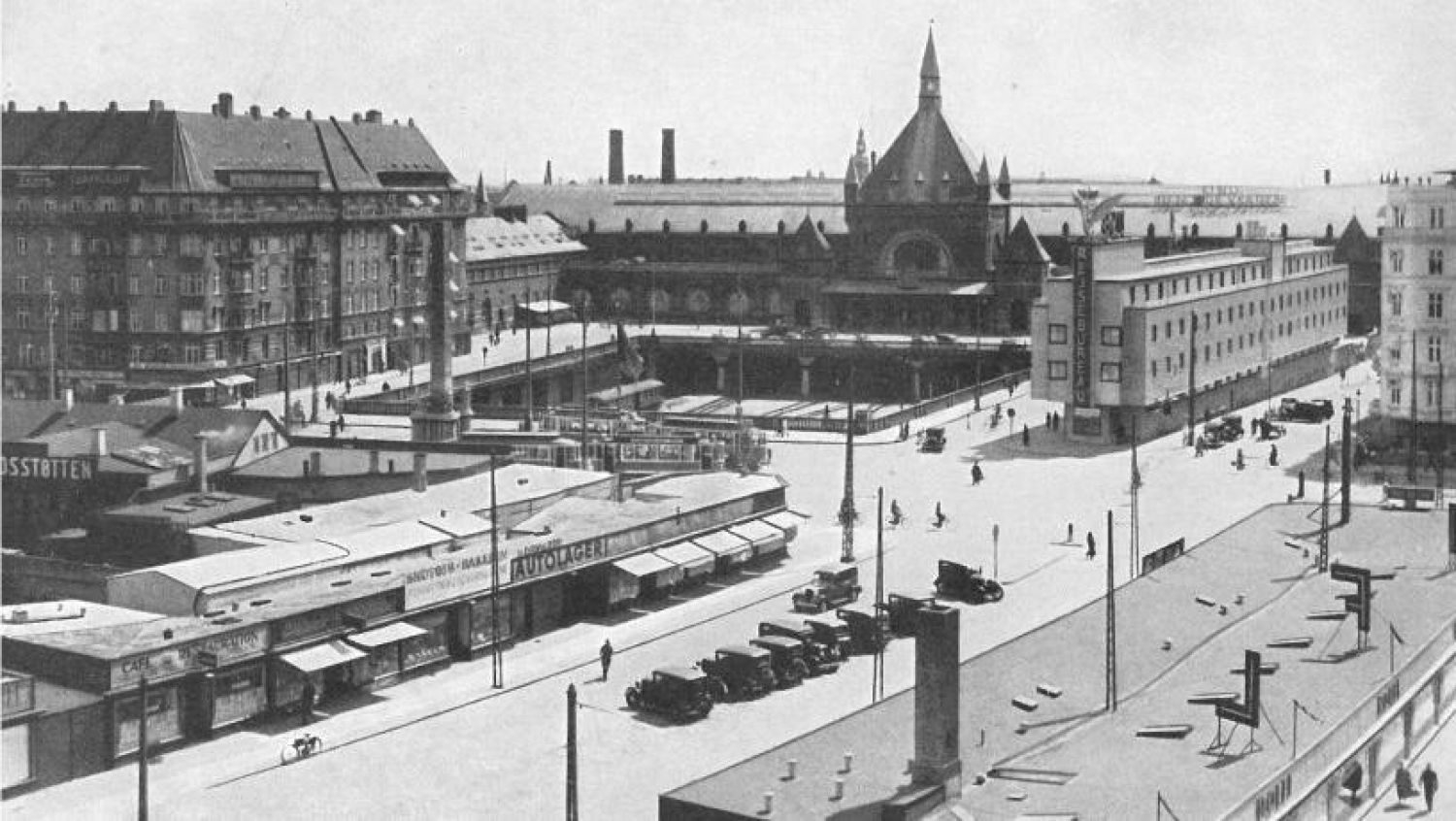
Hotel Astoria in 1935

The building was designed as a station hotel for the Danish State Railways by Ole Falkentorp, who had started his career in the State Railways' design office before forming his own practice. The hotel was built from 1934 to 1935 as the first modern luxury hotel in Copenhagen.

The hotel was inaugurated on 6 April 1935. It contained 91 single and double rooms. DSB's travel agency was located on the ground floor.

=== 21st century ===
In 2007, Hotel Astoria was taken over by DGI-byen. The new owner commissioned GUBI to redesign the interior while preserving many of the original features. Relying on black and white set off by tones of deep purple and greyish blue, a new colour scheme was selected and the building was fitted out with artistically designed, custom-made furniture.

On 1 July 2011 the hotel was taken over by Zleep Hotels. On 1 January 2014, Brøchner Hotels took over management of the hotel. On 1 October 2021, CIC Hospitality took over management of Hotel Astoria.

== Architecture ==
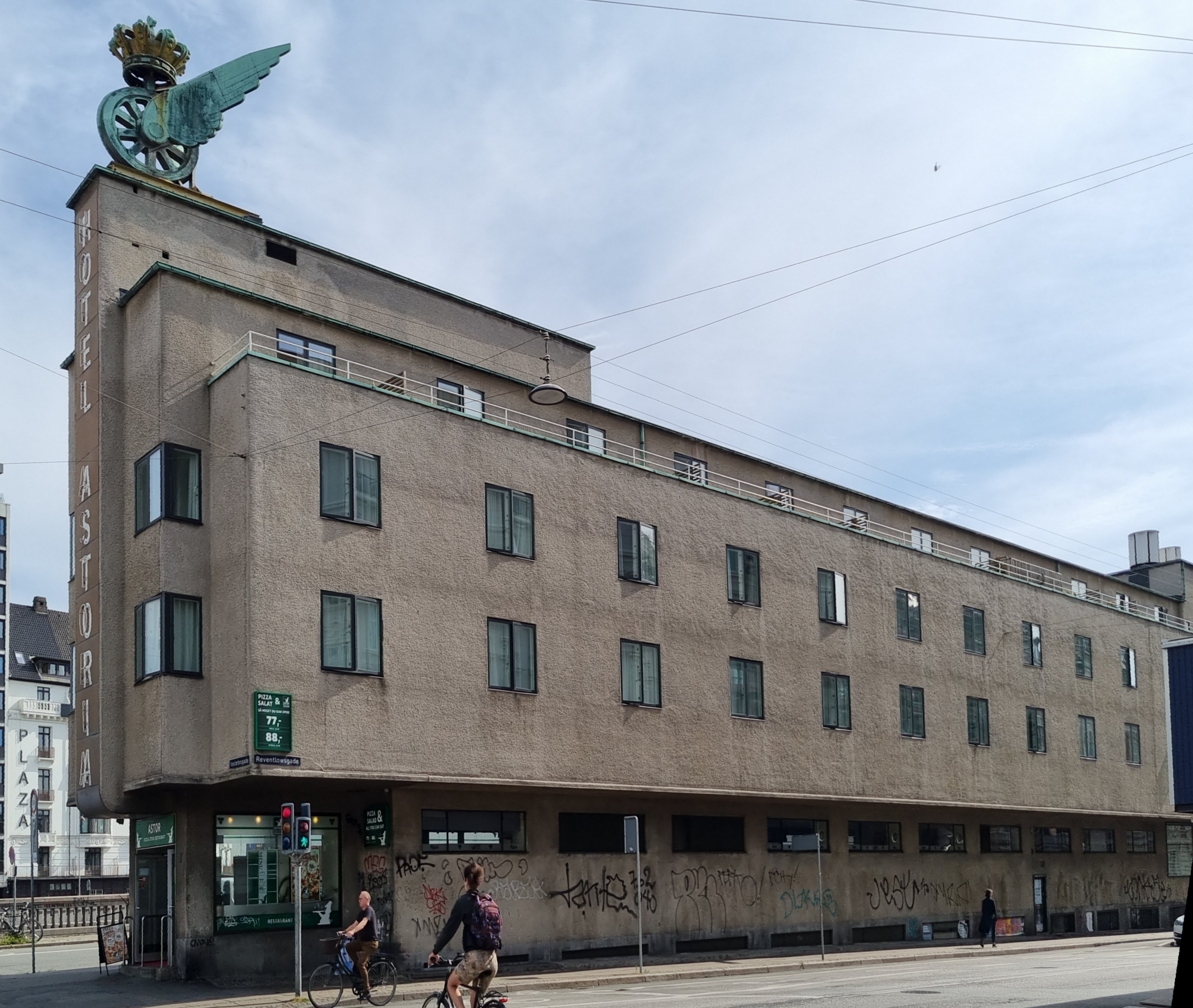
Hotel Astoria

The hotel consists of a long slender wing forming a barrier between the urban space in front of the main entrance to the Central Station, which partly opens to the underground rail lines, and Reventlowsgade, the street on the Vesterbro side of the station.

An example of architecture parlante, the building is intended to resemble a steam locomotive, with its connotations of travel and movement encapsulating the essence of the site, and as an expression of the fascination with progress and technology which was typical of the time. It consists of an expressive constellation of cubist volumes, culminating in the narrow facade looking out over Vesterbrogade which is topped by a "hood ornament" in the shape of a winged wheel bearing a crown, a sculptural representation of the old logo of the Danish State Railways. The vertical, exterior hotel sign is in the full height of the building. At the other end of the building, there is a cylindrical staircase tower with a helical window.

The revolving doors, the first in Denmark, are still present at the main entrance. Next to the main entrance is a relief of the hotel's logo, a winged suitcase, created by the sculptor Svend Rathsack.

Great care was taken by E. Schmidt, the technical designer, in drawing up the detailed specifications for a building which was to be constructed using Asger Skovgaard Ostenfeld's recently developed deformation technique for reinforced concrete structures. The finish on the four-inch-thick walls with metal-framed windows was achieved by manual bush hammering.

The building was listed in the Danish registry of protected buildings and places in 2019.

The hotel has been an inspiration for Peter Clash's design of the RIBA Award-winning Sleeperz Hotel in Cardiff, Wales. A drawing of Hotel Astoria is engraved on Ole Falkentorp's tombstone.

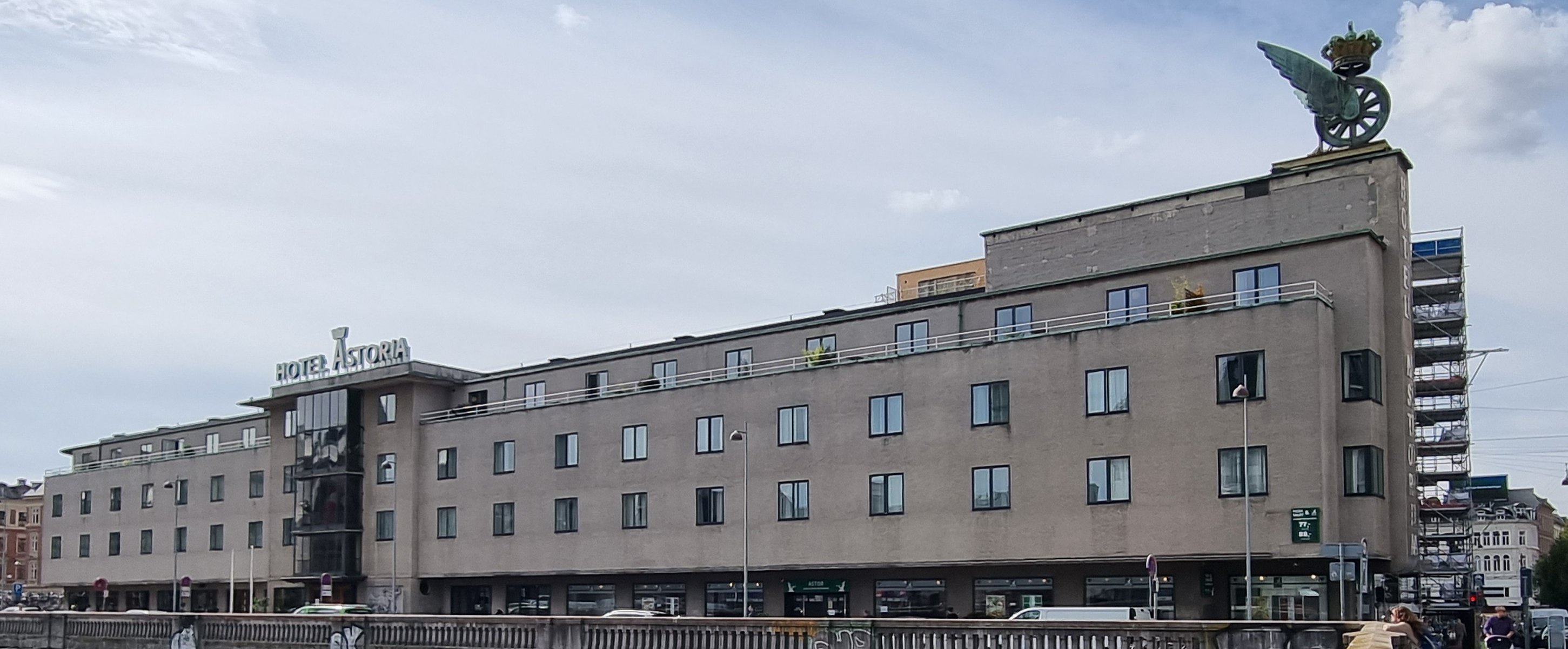
The hotel viewed from Banegårdspladsen.

== Today ==
One of the luxury rooms has been maintained exactly as it was in 1935. The former ground-floor premises of DSB's travel agency is now occupied by a pizzaria.

== Gallery ==
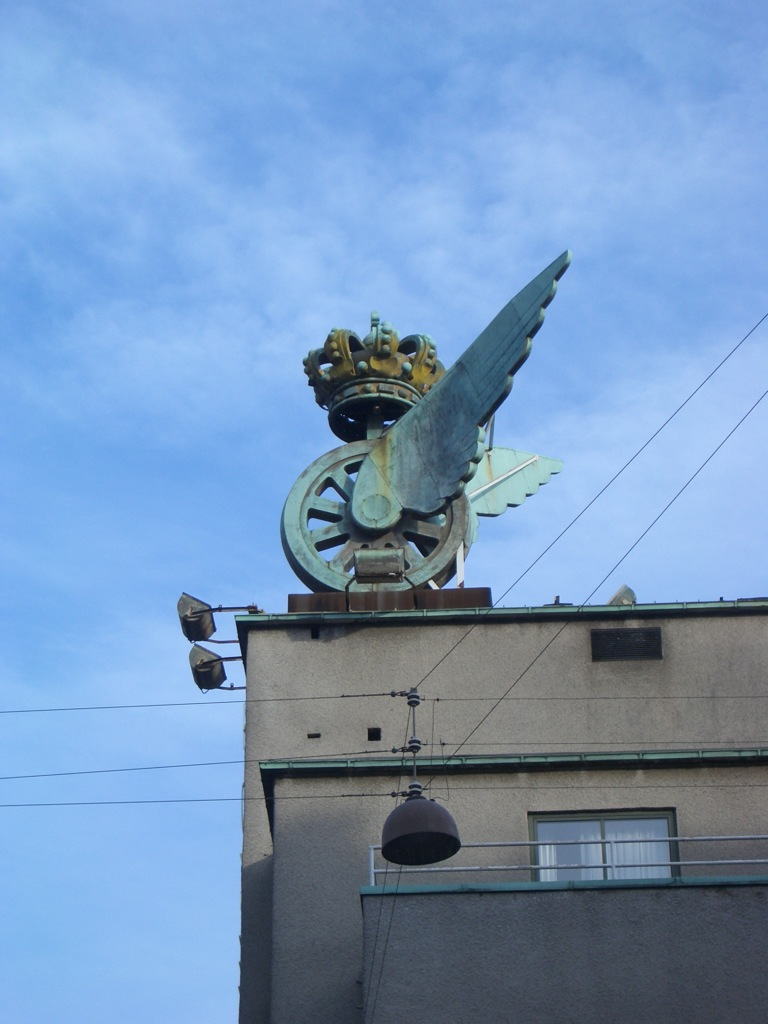
The DSB logo

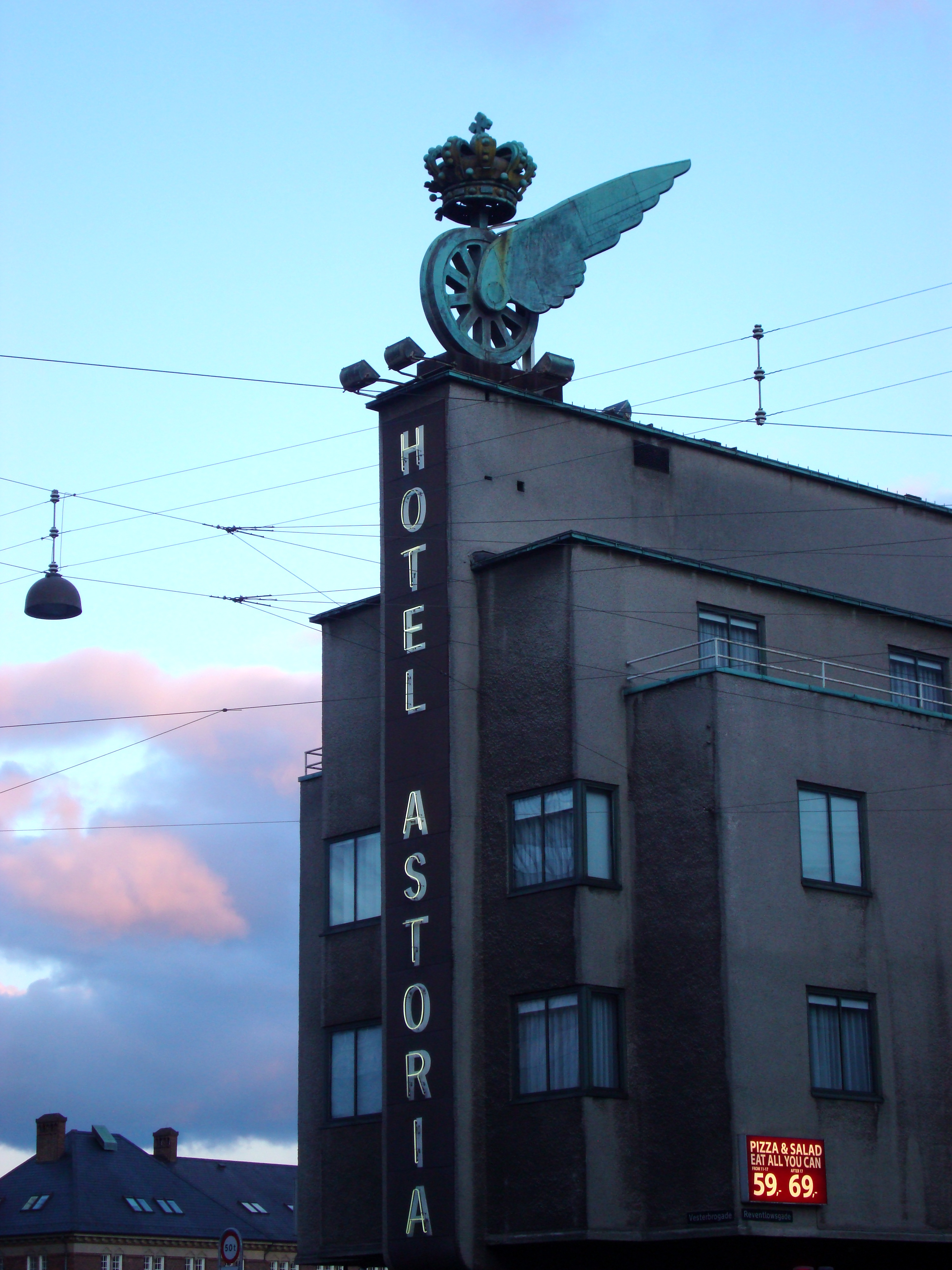

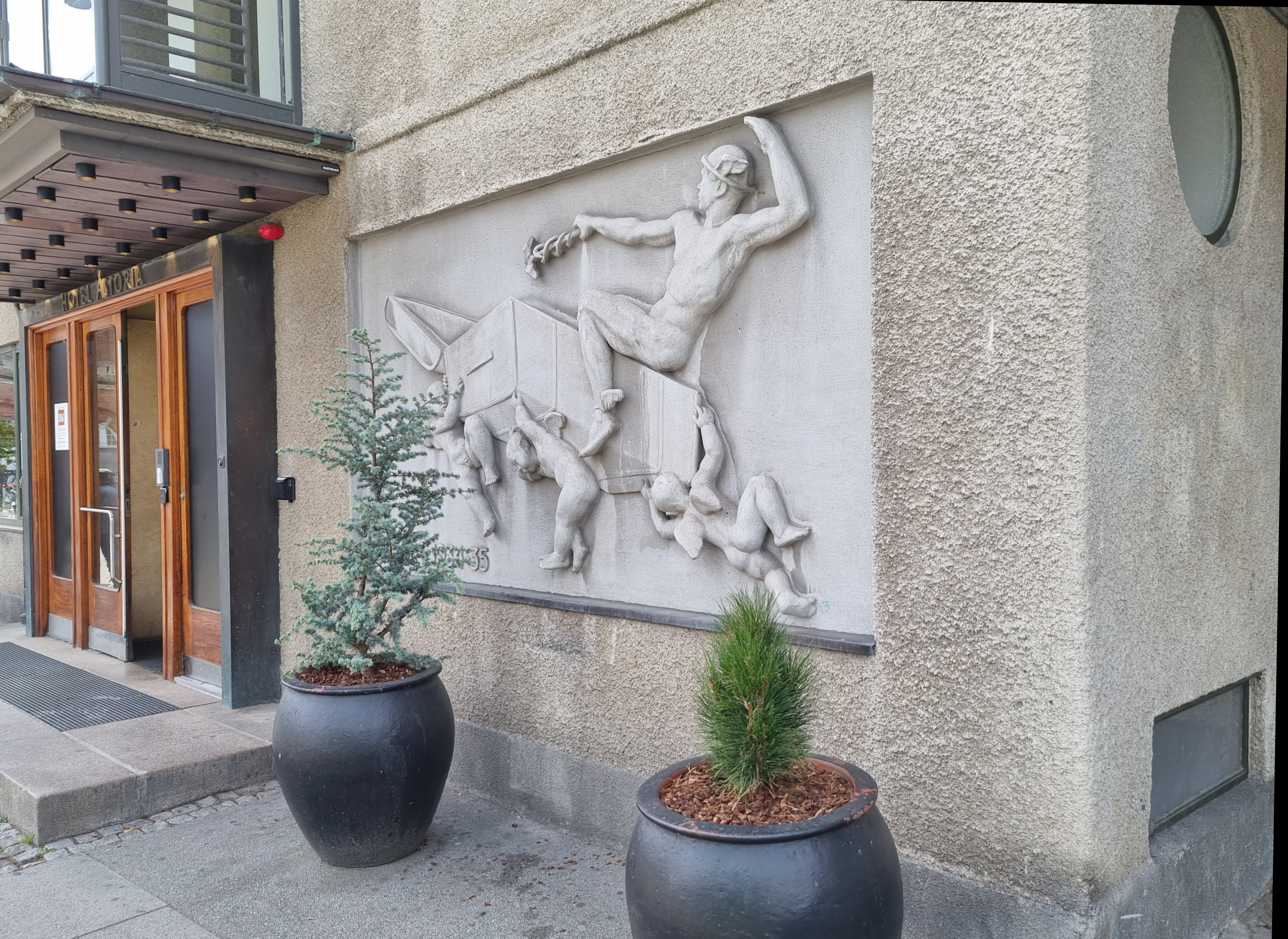
The relief next to the main entrance.

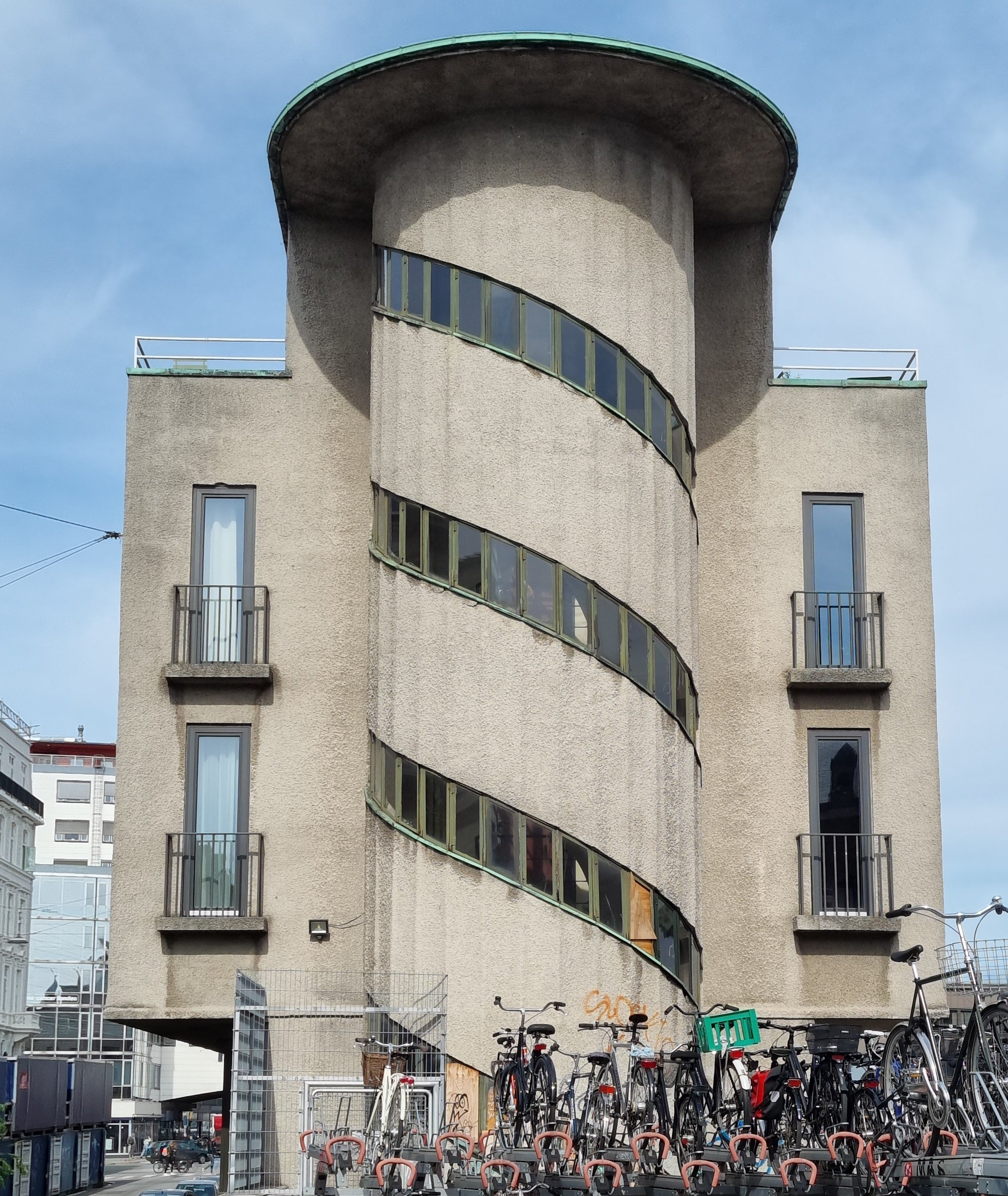
The spiral staircase.

== See also ==
- Arbejdernes Landsbank
- Skovshoved Petrol Station
