= Ole Falkentorp =

Danish architect (1886–1948)

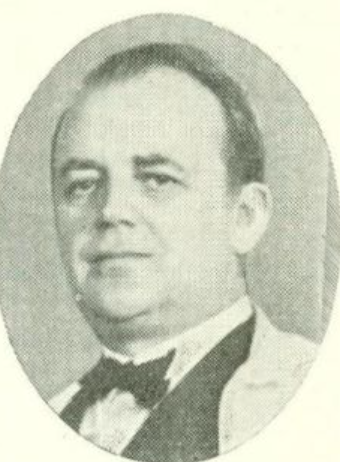
- Portrait of Ole Falkentorp
- Born: 17 February 1886; Copenhagen, Denmark
- Died: 21 August 1948; Samsø, Denmark
- Occupation: architect

Signature
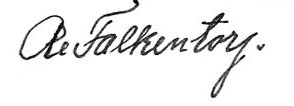

Ole Falkentorp (18 February 1886 – 21 August 1948) was a Danish architect. His architectural expression moved from Neoclassicism through Modernism to Functionalism.

== Early life and education ==
Johannes Oluf Ole Falkentorp was born into a family of architects in Copenhagen. His father was Albert Jensen, architect, professor and Royal Building Inspector, and his mother Sophie Jensen née Nebelong, daughter of the architect Niels Sigfred Nebelong. He adopted the surname to Falkentorp in 1899.

He was enrolled at the Royal Danish Academy of Fine Arts, where Historicism still dominated and his father was a central figure, but left shortly after. Instead he took classes at a technical school and apprenticed as a mason. He was then articled to Heinrich Wenck, head of the architectural office of the Danish State Railways. There he met Carl Petersen and Povl Baumann with whom he would later collaborate on several projects.

== Career ==
Important works, all in Copenhagen, include the housing development Classen Have (1924, with Carl Petersen and Povl Baumann), the copper-clad office building Ved Vesterport (1930–32, with Povl Baumann) and the Hornbæk Badehotel (1935) and Hotel Astoria (1935) next to Copenhagen Central Station.

In 1911, Falkentorp was a co-founder and dedicated debating member of the alternative architecture association Den Frie Arkitektforening (now Danske Arkitekters Landsforbundan) .

== Personal life ==
Falkentorp was married twice. His first wife was clerk Hella Cecilia Mørch (1898-1952, a daughter of machinist Aksel Mørch (1858-1920) and Hedvig Winther, (1876-1953). The couple was later divorced. His second wife was architect Inger Johanne Elisabeth Gregersen (1904-1952), daughter of engineer Gunnar Gregersen (1875-1950) and mag.art. Johanne Salomon (1877-1960). Their wedding took place on 10 February at Frederiksborg Town Hall. His father-in-law served as director of the Danish Institute of Technology.

== Selected works ==
- Ved Classens Have (1924, with Carl Petersen and Povl Baumann)
- Ved Vesterport, Vesterbrogade, Copenhagen (1930–32, with Povl Baumann
- Hotel Astoria, Banegårdspladsen, Copenhagen (1934–35)
- Hornbæk Badehotel, Hornbæk (1934–35)
- Hotel Codan, Sankt Annæ Plads, Copenhagen (1948–50, with Ole Buhl and Harald Petersen)

== Gallery ==
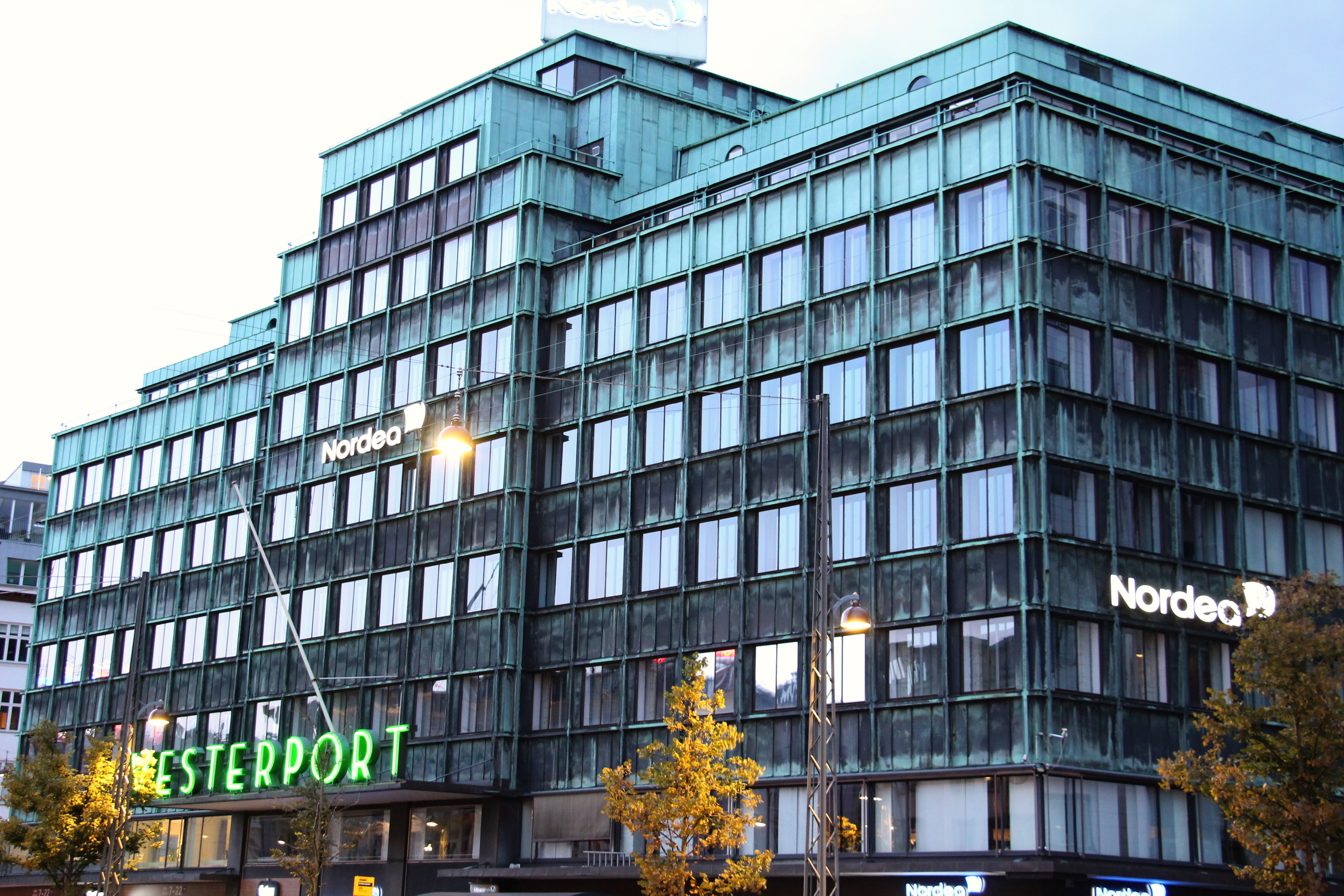
Ved Vesterport, Copenhagen
(1930-32)

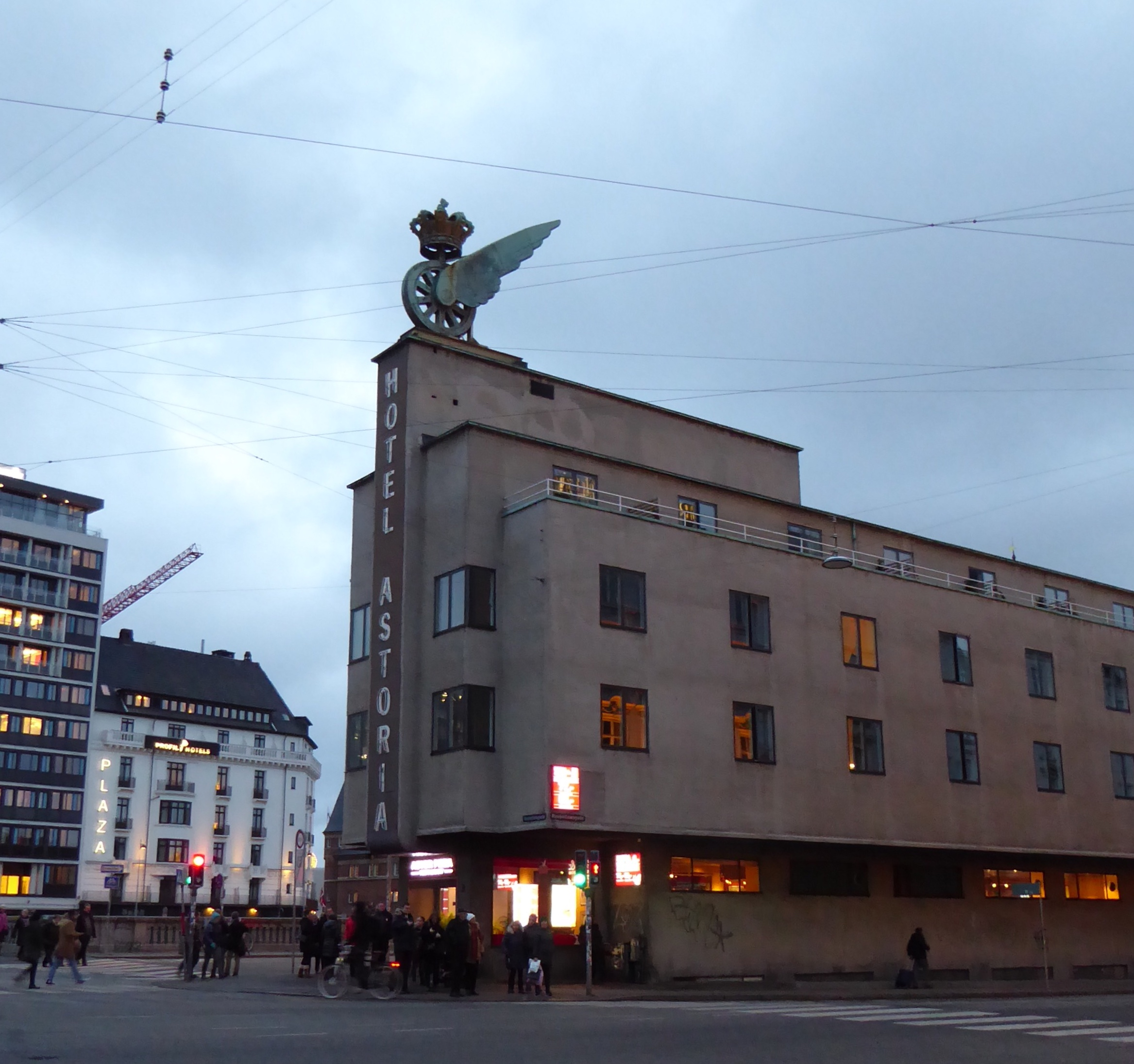
Hotel Astoria
(1935)

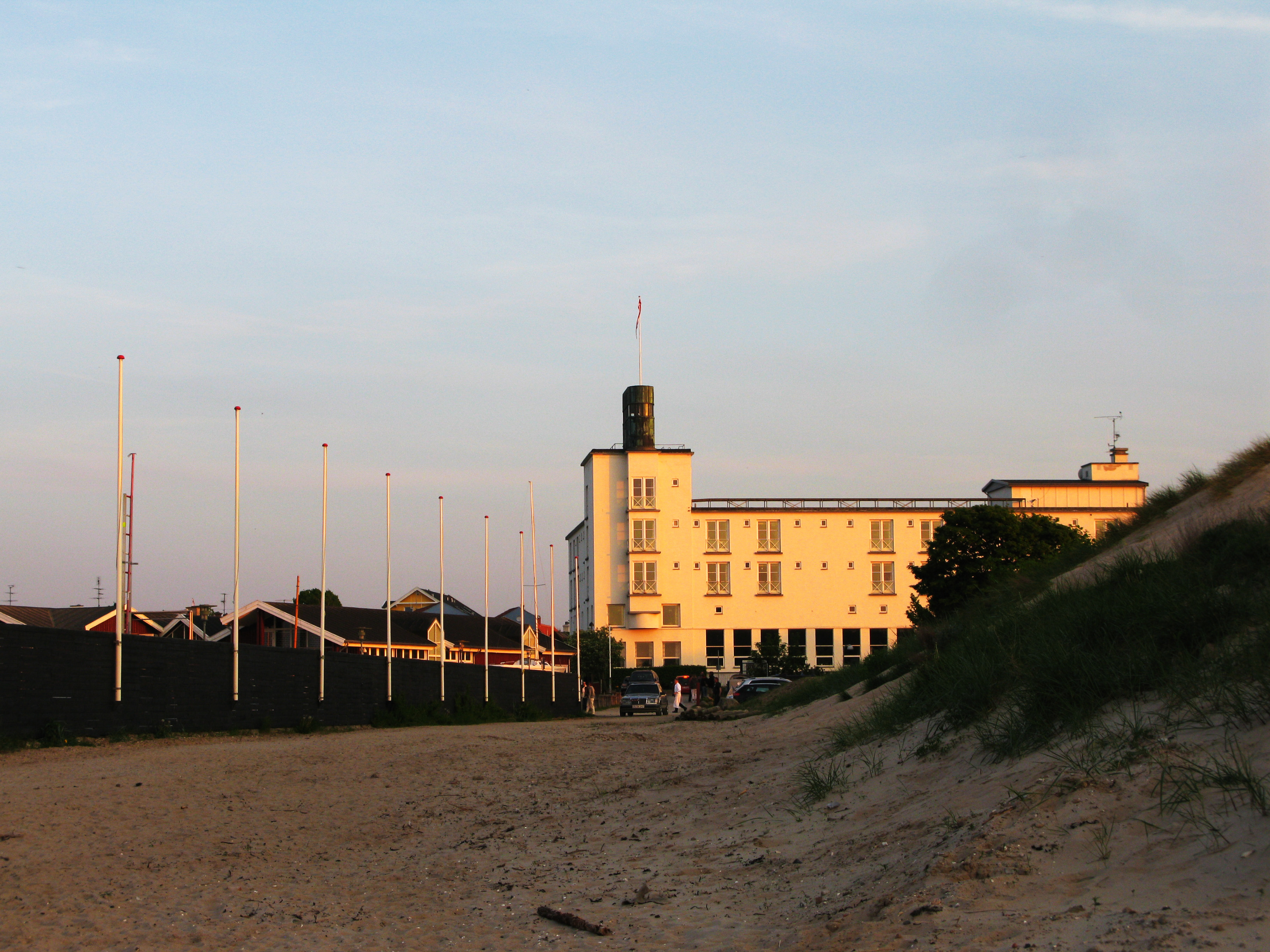
Hornbæk Badehotel (1935)

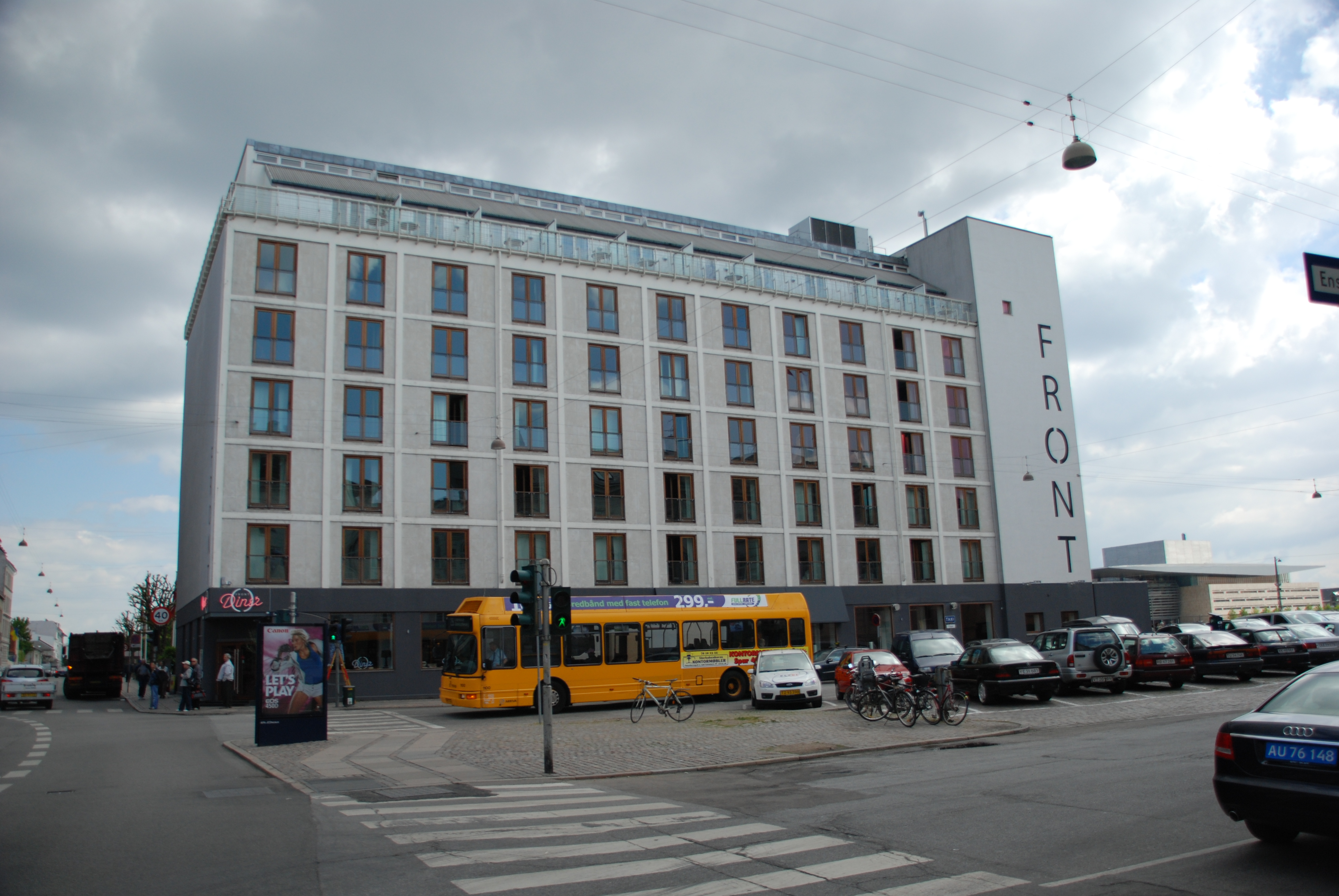
Hotel Codan
(1950)
