= Copenhagen Central Station =

Main railway station in Copenhagen, Denmark

København H
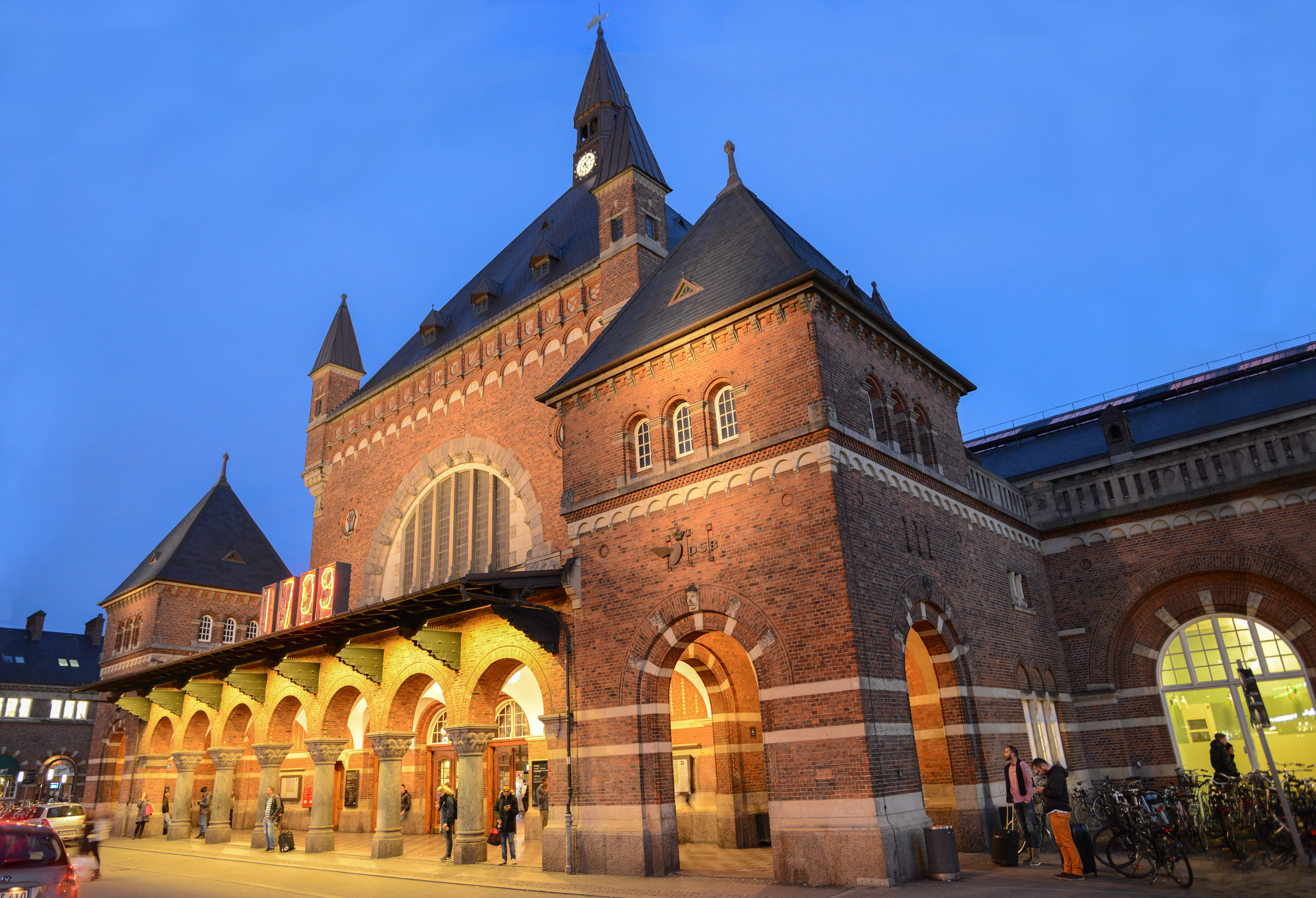
- Main entrance

General information
- Location: Banegårdspladsen 7; 1570 Copenhagen V Copenhagen Municipality; Denmark
- Coordinates: 55°40′22″N 12°33′52″E
- Elevation: 3 m (9.8 ft) above sea level
- System: S-train, Metro and national railway station
- Owner: DSB (station infrastructure); Banedanmark (rail infrastructure)
- Operator: DSB
- Platforms: 7 (island platforms including Metro, 1 long-distance)
- Tracks: 15 (9 InterCity/Regional/International, 802, RE, 6 S-train, 2 Metro)
- Train operators: DSB; Copenhagen Metro; Metroselskabet; SJ; České dráhy Skånetrafiken; Snälltåget; Øresundståg
- Bus routes: 11, 17, 23, 26, 31, 33, 37, 68, 71, 72, 74, 2A, 7A, 7E, 5C, 250S, 93N, 97N, 888, 666, CopenhellBus, Kombardo Expresses, FlixBus, Flextraffic, FlexBus, Telebus, Plustur, Flextur, GoByBus, Swebus Express, Euroline, Shuttle bus, DFDS Shuttlebus, Hop On-Hop Off Bus Sightseeing, RED Sightseeing Copenhagen, TrainBus

Construction
- Platform levels: 2
- Architect: Heinrich Wenck

Other information
- Station code: Kh
- Fare zone: 1

History
- Opened: 1 December 1911; 114 years ago
- Rebuilt: 15 May 1934 (S-train)
- Electrified: 1934 (S-train), 1986 (Mainline)
Location
- Location within Copenhagen Location within Greater Copenhagen Location within Denmark

Copenhagen Central Station (Danish: Københavns Hovedbanegård [kʰøpm̩ˈhɑwns ˈhoːð̩pɛnəˌkɒˀ]; abbreviated København H, colloquially usually referred to as Hovedbanegården or simply Hovedbanen) is the main railway station in Copenhagen, Denmark, and the largest railway station in Denmark. With more than 100,000 travellers every day, it is the second busiest station in Denmark after Nørreport station. (Note: Nørreport Station has a larger passenger throughput if urban S-train and Metro services are included.) It is located in central Copenhagen, situated between the districts of Indre By and Vesterbro with entrances from Bernstorffsgade (opposite Tivoli Gardens), Banegårdspladsen, Reventlowsgade and access to platforms from Tietgensgade.

Copenhagen Central Station is the hub of the DSB railway network serving Denmark and international destinations. It offers international train services to Sweden, Germany, and the Czech Republic, InterCity and express train services across Denmark, regular and frequent regional train services to and from Zealand and southern Sweden (also referred to as Øresund trains), commuter rail services of the Copenhagen S-train network across the Greater Copenhagen area, as well as lines M3 (City Circle Line) & M4 of the Copenhagen Metro network.

The first station in Copenhagen opened in 1847. The current station building opened in 1911 and is the work of architect Heinrich Wenck. The station has 7 platforms and 13 tracks. On the station concourse, there are many small shops, restaurants, cafés, and fast food outlets.

== Location ==
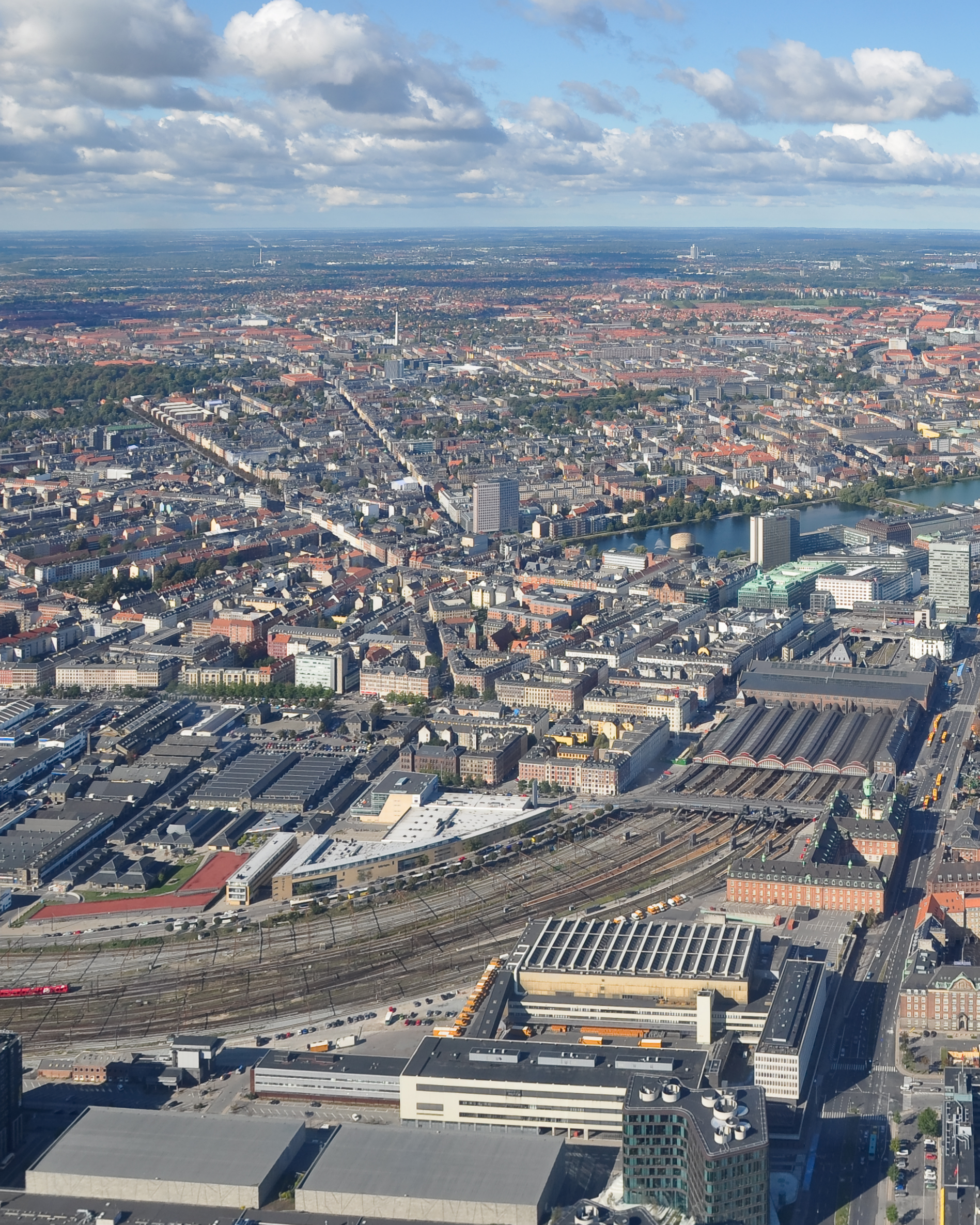
Aerial view of the station with the city district of Vesterbro to the left.

The central station is located in the centre of Copenhagen, on the south-eastern perimeter of the historic old town, between the city districts of Indre By and Vesterbro. The station complex is bounded by the streets Bernstorffsgade, Banegårdspladsen, Reventlowsgade and Tietgensgade, the latter of which crosses the station throat on Tietgensbroen (the Tietgen's Bridge). One of the main arteries of Copenhagen, Vesterbrogade, crosses the railway tracks a short distance to the north of the station.

The station is situated in a dense urban environment; To the east, it is immediately adjacent to the inner-city amusement park Tivoli Gardens. To the north, opposite the main portal on Banegårdspladsen, stands the Liberty Memorial in Vesterbrogade, erected in 1797 to commemorate the abolition of serfdom in Denmark. Banegårdspladsen is surrounded by the historic hotels Hotel Plaza, Hotel Astoria from 1935, and Hotel Royal from 1960, designed by Danish architect and designer Arne Jacobsen. To the west of the station starts Istedgade, which developed into an entertainment and red light district after the station had opened, but has undergone a partial gentrification process in later years.

The station building has entrances from Bernstorffsgade, Banegårdspladsen and Reventlowsgade, and the platforms have direct access via stairs from Tietgensbroen. The underground metro station can be accessed 24/7 directly from the platforms by an underpass under the tracks but also has its own, separate entrance in Stampesgade outside the station complex. On weekdays the Central Station hall is open only from 4:30am to 2:00am and when it is closed, it is possible to access to the platforms via the Tietgen's bridge.

== History ==
=== First station ===
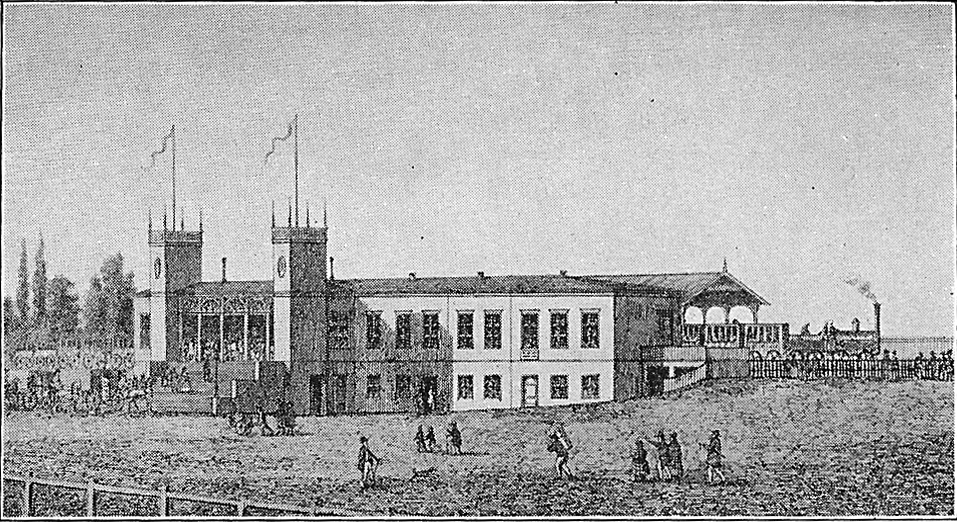
Copenhagen's first railway station

The first railway station in Copenhagen was constructed on behalf of Det Sjællandske Jernbaneselskab (the Zealand Railway Company) to serve as the eastern terminal station of the new Copenhagen–Roskilde railway line from Copenhagen to Roskilde, the first railway line in the Kingdom of Denmark. (Note: The first railway line in the then Danish Monarchy was the Kiel-Altona railway line in the Duchy of Holstein which had been completed three years earlier. However, the Duchy of Holstein was later lost to the Kingdom of Prussia after the Second Schleswig War in 1864, and that railway line is today part of the German rail network.) The station was ceremonially opened by King Christian VIII amid great festivities on 26 June 1847 along with the railway line, which was prolonged from Roskilde to the port city of Korsør by the Great Belt in 1856. For the opening the Danish composer Hans Christian Lumbye composed the still popular Copenhagen Steam Railway Galop, a musical composition which faithfully recreates the sounds of a train chugging out of a station and grinding to a halt at the next stop. (Note: The Copenhagen Steam Railway Galop was included in the 2006 Danish Culture Canon as a masterpiece of Danish classical music.) The Danish author Hans Christian Andersen was also very enthusiastic about the first railway and wrote that driving a train was like flying.

The station was located at the site of Dronningens Enghave (the Queen's Meadow Garden), a former royal pleasure garden located just outside the Vesterport (Western Gate) city gate of Copenhagen. The first station was located approximately at the site of the current station, but the tracks were perpendicular to their current direction, as the railway line then left the city along the current streets Halmtorvet and Sønder Boulevard. The station building was constructed of wood as it was built outside the city's fortifications within the demarcation line, a no-build zone outside the ramparts where brick buildings were not allowed for military reasons. In case of war, the army should be able to burn buildings in the firing range outside the ramparts.

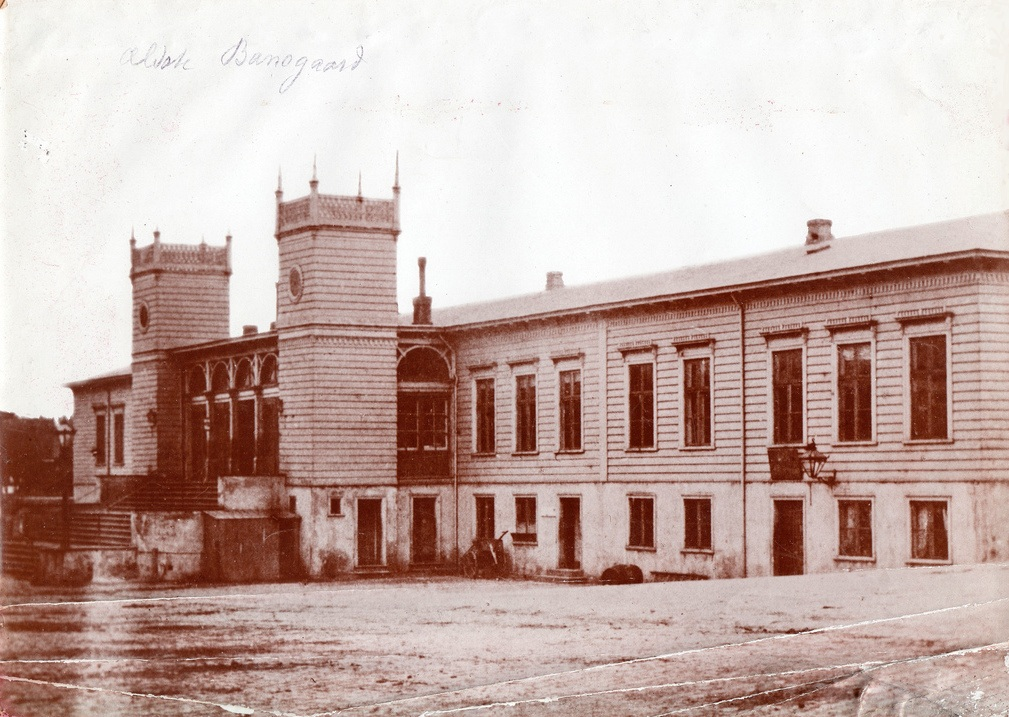
The first station, photographed in 1864, just before its demolition

This railway station and the still existing Roskilde station (which is built in brick) are both linked to a largely unknown architect named L.F. Meyer (or Meier). But it has also been suggested that the railway station in Copenhagen should be attributed to the architect Harald Conrad Stilling, as there are strong similarities between the railway station and Stilling's roller coaster in the amusement park Tivoli Gardens. Both buildings are characterized by Italian rural architecture, and Stilling was one of the most well-versed architects of this Italian style, just as he had insight into wood construction from his assignments at Tivoli. For both station buildings, a motif with two towers without spires is a central part of the composition (the towers at Roskilde station were crowned by a balustrade until 1873, when they were covered by pyramid roofs).

The first station building was demolished in 1865.

=== Second station ===
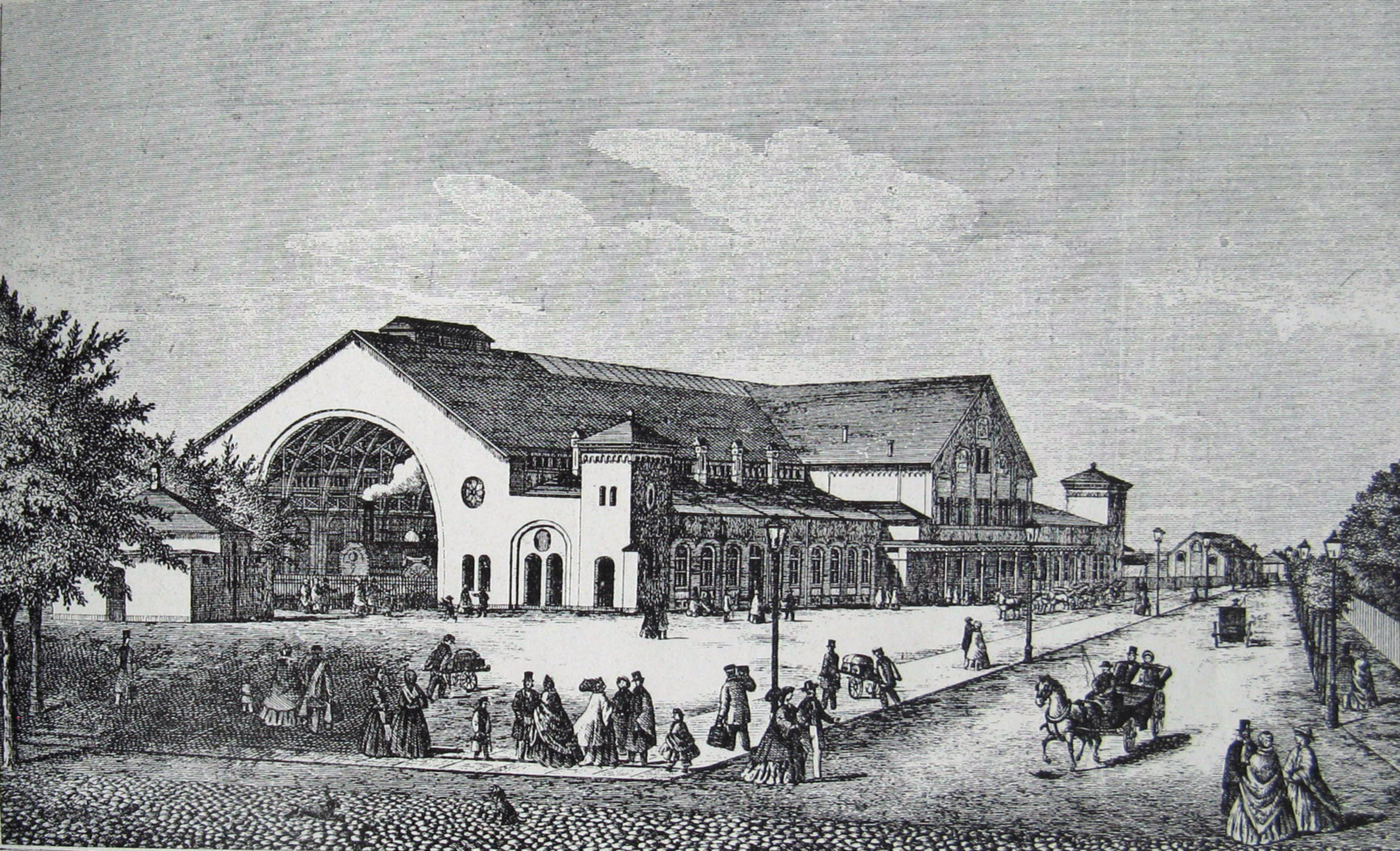
Copenhagen's second railway station

In the 1860s, there were several plans to expand the railway network in Denmark, and in particular to connect a northbound line to North Zealand with the existing westbound line to Roskilde and the rest of Zealand. As a consequence, an expansion of the old station became necessary. A proposal to build a new station close to the old Nørreport (Northern Gate) city gate was abandoned due to opposition from the Rigsdag, Denmark's parliament. In the end, it was decided to replace the old station and build a new larger station near the location of the old one. The construction started in 1863 and the station opened on 14 October 1864. As planned, the new railway station was also to service the new northbound railway lines that opened the year before, the North Line to Hillerød and Elsinore and its branch line, the Klampenborg Line to Klampenborg.

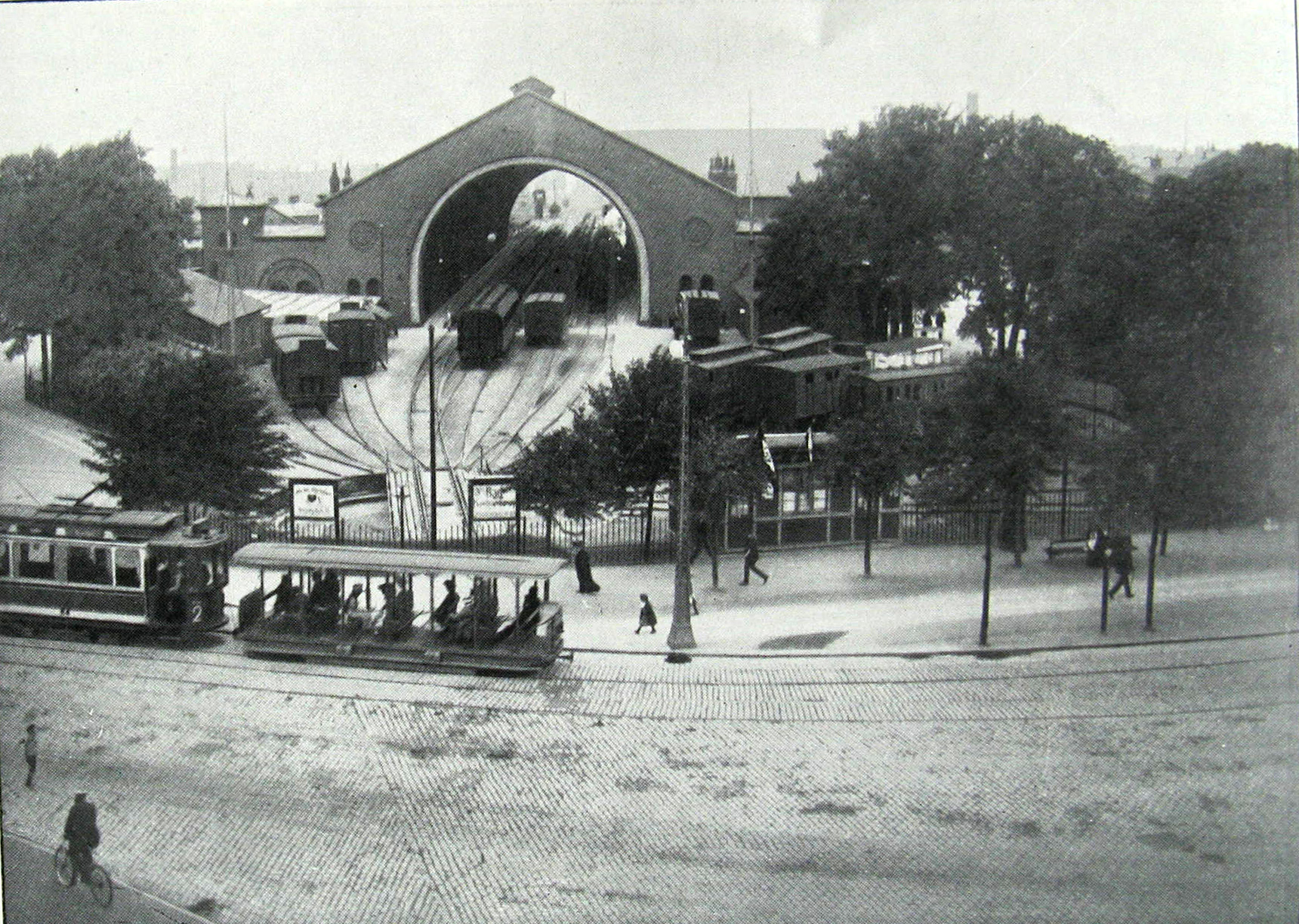
The second station, seen from Vesterbrogade

The new railway station was located a little north of the location of the old one, on the other side of Vesterbrogade. The station building was located approximately where the Palads Cinema and Axelborg lie today, but it was part of a larger facility, as there was a freight station in the same area. Together with track areas, depots, and turntables, the station area filled virtually the entire area, which today lies between Axeltorv, Gyldenløvesgade and Vester Søgade. As traffic increased, several additional smaller station buildings gradually opened in the station area. A separate station called the Klampenborg station for the Klampenborg Line had opened already in 1863. In 1887, a significant expansion of the area took place as a new separate station called the Klampenborg station opened for the Klampenborg Line, and the name of the old Klampenborg station was changed to the North station. And in 1896 a separate station for trains to Holte on the North Line, the Holte station, was opened just to the north of the North station.

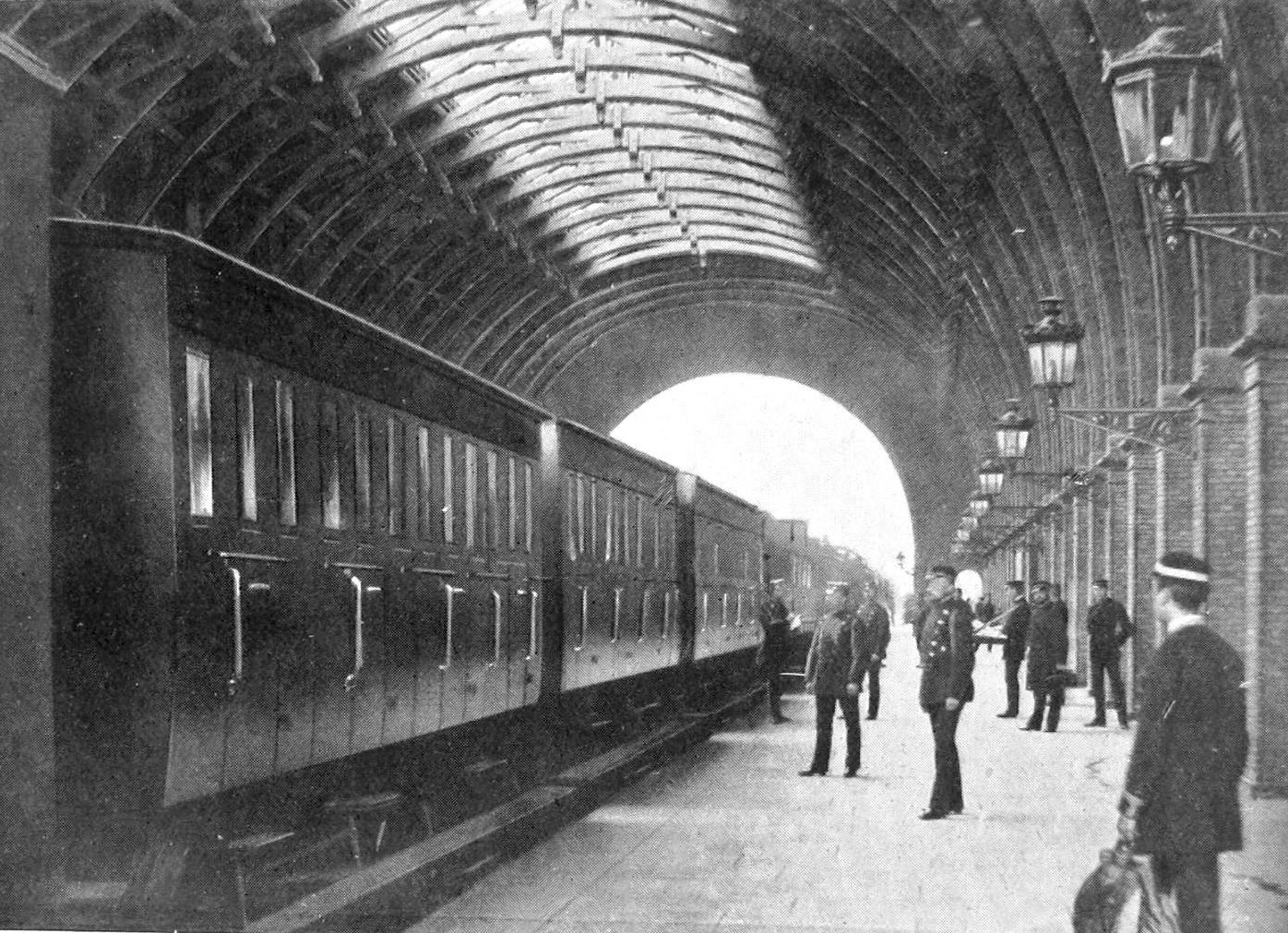
The hall of the second station

The station building was designed by the architect Johan Daniel Herholdt in the Rundbogenstil that now became popular in the architecture of the Germanic world. After the dismantling of fortifications of Copenhagen and the abandonment of the demarcation line in 1856, the building could be constructed in red brick. It consisted of two 25-span buildings connected by a wooden arch crowned by a large slate roof. Four tracks passed through the hall. The departure side was by the current Axeltorv, and on this side there were offices, luggage expedition and waiting rooms. The waiting rooms were divided into 1st, 2nd and 3rd class. Further on there was a royal waiting room and then toilets. As the volume of traffic increased, a special freight forwarding building was added.

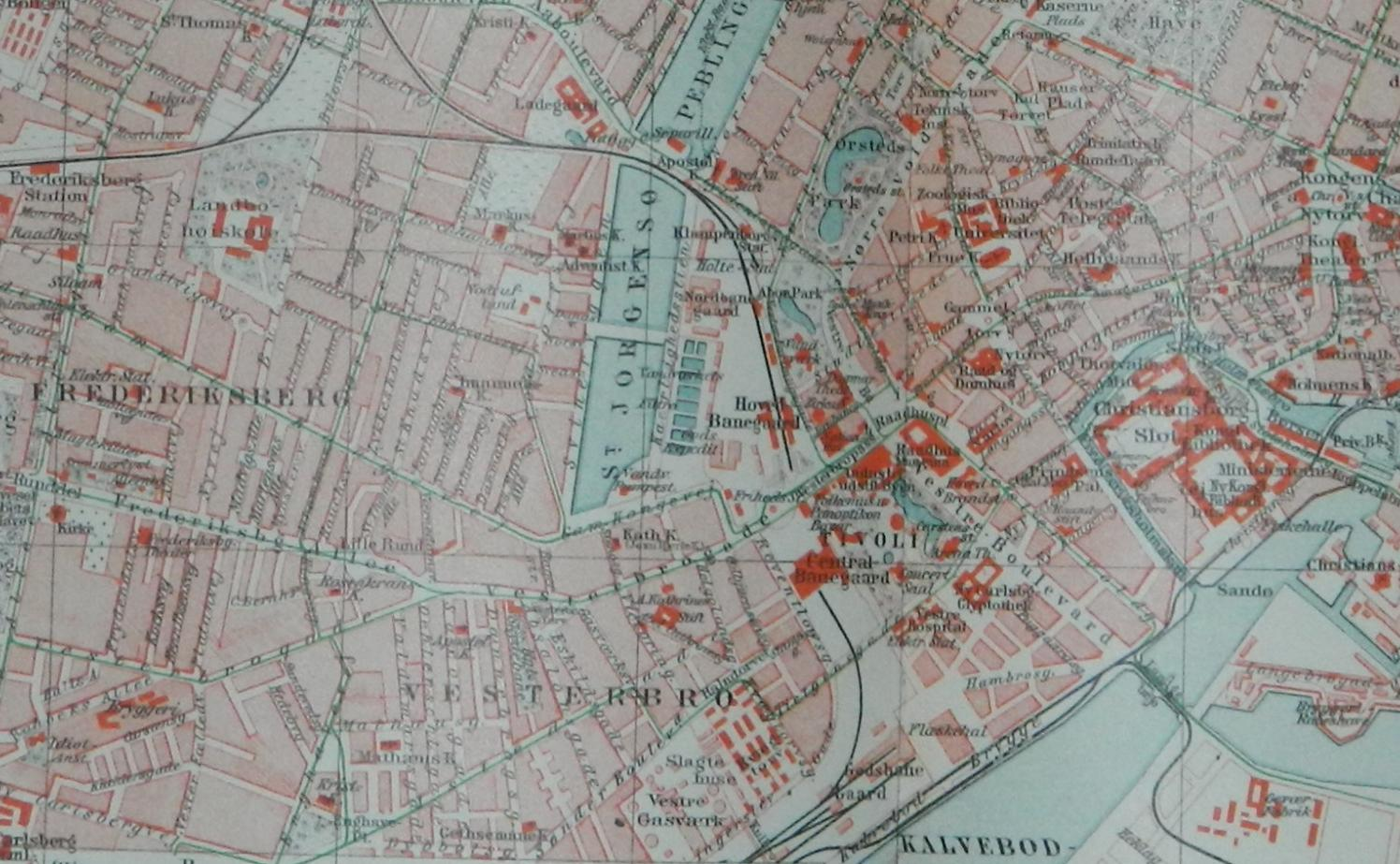
Central Copenhagen around 1905. The map shows the second station (Hoved Banegaard), as well as the beginning of today's station (Central Banegaard ), on opposite sides of Vesterbrogade and without connection to each other. Trains to and from the second station crossed the Lakes on a dam. Frederiksberg Station is seen at the top left.

In the long run, however, this second station also became too cramped, especially because it was a terminal station with only one track leading out of the city which had to cross the lakes of Copenhagen on a narrow dam along Gyldenløvesgade. On the other side of the lakes, the track split in two: to the west via Frederiksberg station to Roskilde and Frederikssund and to the north via Nørrebro station and Hellerup station to Hillerød, Helsingør and Klampenborg. (Note: Trains on the Coast Line between Copenhagen and Elsinore, which opened in 1897, terminated at Copenhagen East station (now: Østerport station) until 1917.) The tracks are long gone, but large sections can still easily be seen in the street network. The large Nørrebro Park and the Superkilen public park in Nørrebro are located on the grounds of the former Nørrebro Station. Matters were made worse from the fact that the tracks had several level crossings on the way out of the city, which with the steadily increasing train traffic led to frequent blockages for the equally steadily increasing road traffic when the barriers were down.

=== The third and current railway station ===
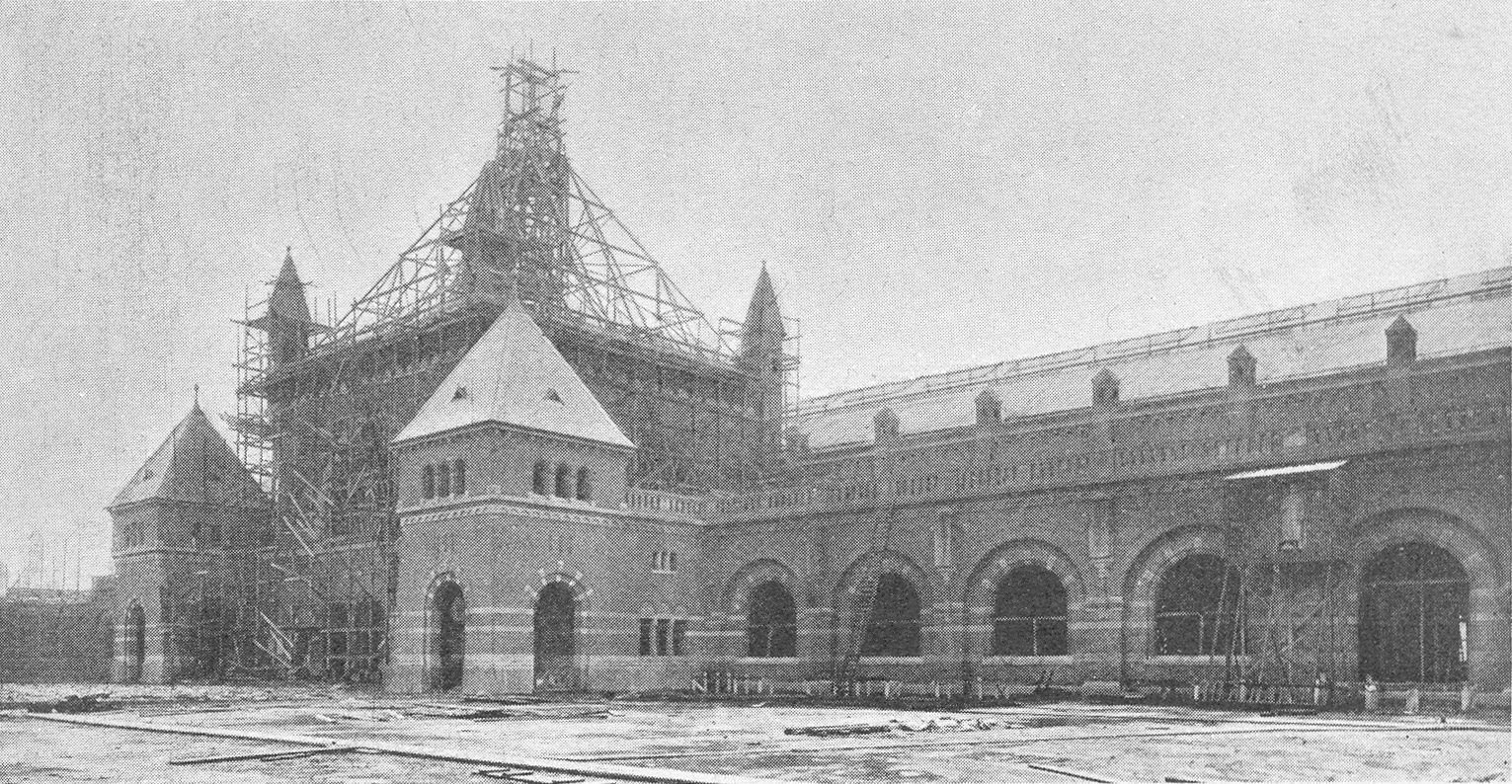
The third station, under construction in 1910

By the end of the 19th century, it had become increasingly clear that the conditions at the second railway station had become too narrow and outdated. Already from the end of the 1870s, it was discussed how to solve these problems with Copenhagen's railway connections. After many years of discussions, the Rigsdag, Denmark's parliament finally decided in 1904 to build a brand new railway station, approximately at the location of the first station. The new station was to be a through station with the tracks of the westbound lines leading south from the new station out of the city along Ingerslevsgade via Valby station towards Roskilde and Frederikssund, and the tracks of the northbound lines leading north from the new station through a railway tunnel to Østerport station and continuing north from there via Hellerup station to Hillerød and Elsinore.

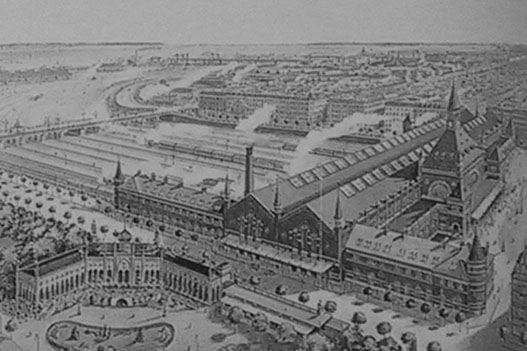
The third station in 1911, with a part of Tivoli Gardens

The new station was opened on 30 November 1911 by Crown Prince Christian, who stated:

It will probably stand as a monumental reminder of Danish architecture in the beginning of the 20th century. As I express the wish that our new station may make establish a more firm connection between the capital and the country and between Denmark and abroad, I declare Copenhagen Station open!.

The following day, 1 December, the first train departed from the station.

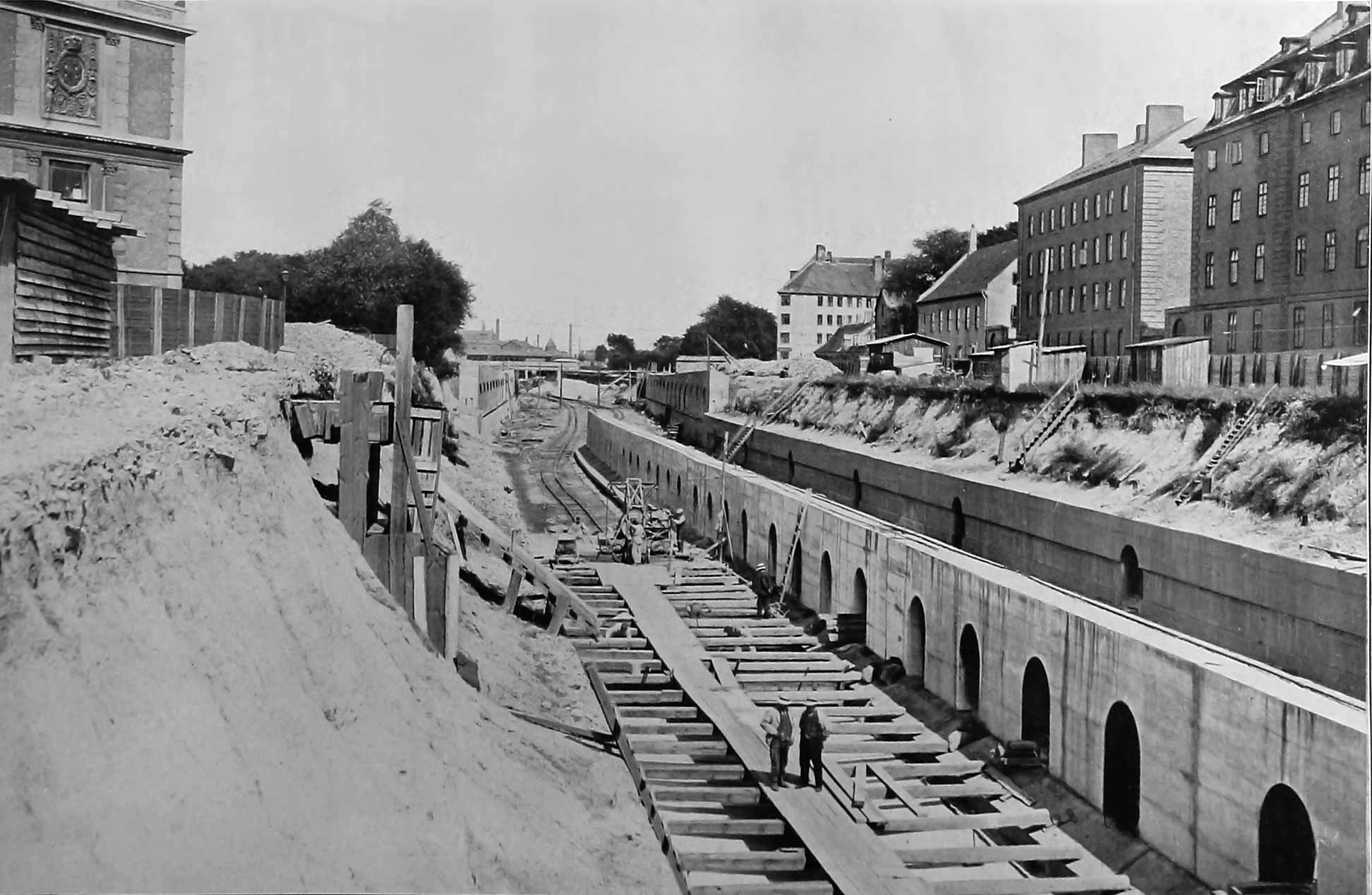
The Boulevard Line under construction in 1914

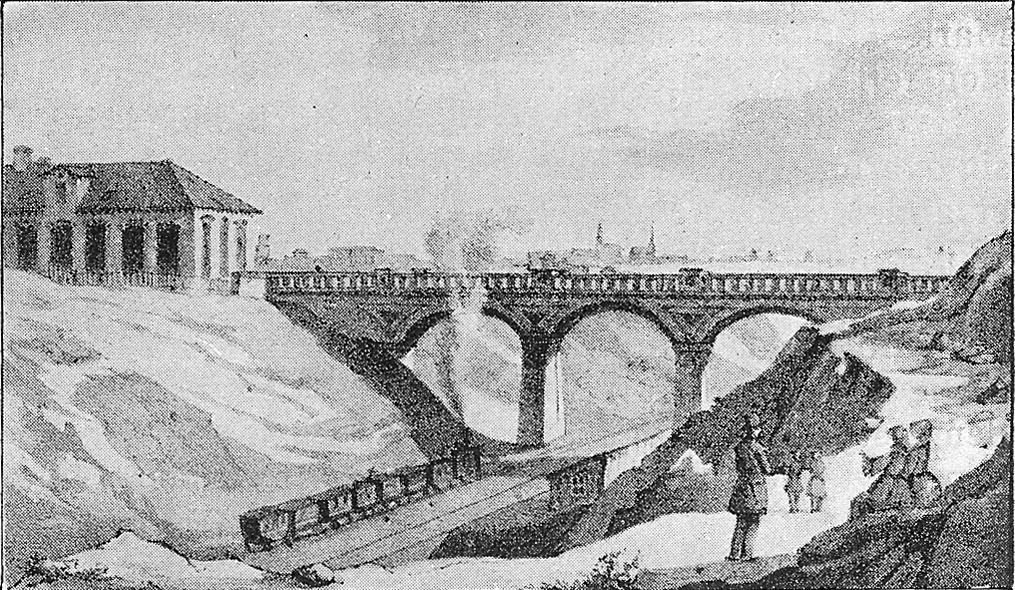

Since the northbound tunnel (the Boulevard Line) was not opened until 1917, the new station was initially only served by trains on the westbound lines, and the old station continued to serve the trains on the northbound lines for a period. With the opening of the first double track of the Boulevard line on 1 December 1917, the direct connection with Østerport station was established. Now trains along the line from Copenhagen to Elsinore could continue directly to the new central station, just as trains along the Klampenborg Line were diverted via Østerport from the previous route from Hellerup via Nørrebro to the second station. However, it was not until the opening of the second double track of the Boulevard line on 1 October 1921, that trains on the Copenhagen to Hillerød line from Hillerød were diverted through the tunnel. The old station could thus finally be permanently closed.

The station was overhauled in 1980. Escalators and lifts were established to the platforms, and the station concourse, which was originally split into arrival, departure, and freight sections, was redone completely. The station was overhauled again from 2004 to 2008. This overhaul replaced the roof, lowered platforms 3 to 6 to international standards and lengthened them. The towers and the bridge over the platforms, upon which the main station building is placed, were reconditioned.

== Architecture ==
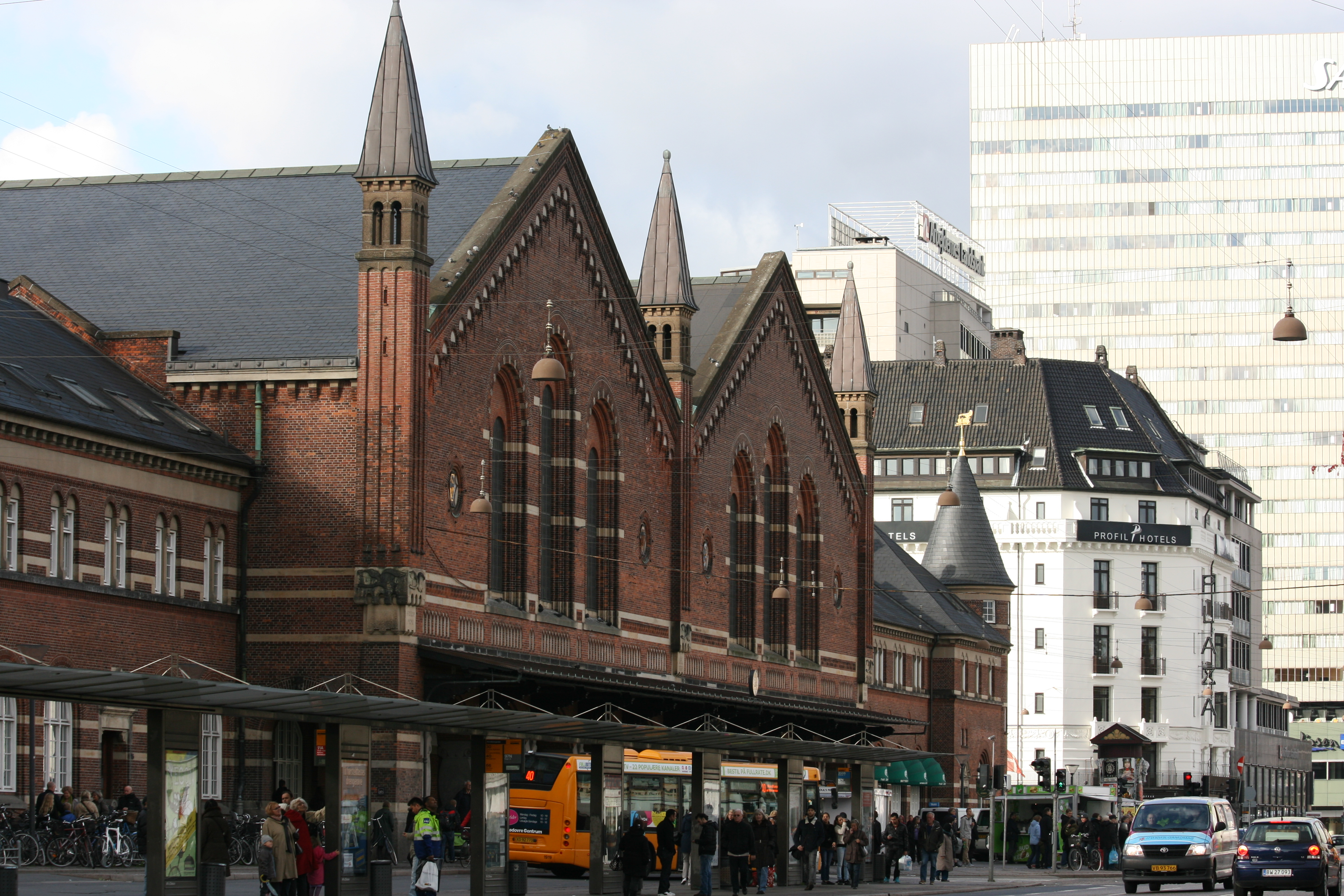
Building seen from Bernstorffsgade

The station was designed by Danish architect Heinrich Wenck, who was head architect of the Danish State Railways from 1894 to 1921. The creation of the station project proved to be difficult. In the years 1898–1902, Wenck prepared several proposals for a new multi-storey station building, which, however, were rejected by the Rigsdag for being unnecessarily lavish. In most of these proposals, Wenck proposed a combined station and administration building for the Danish State Railways, which was rejected.

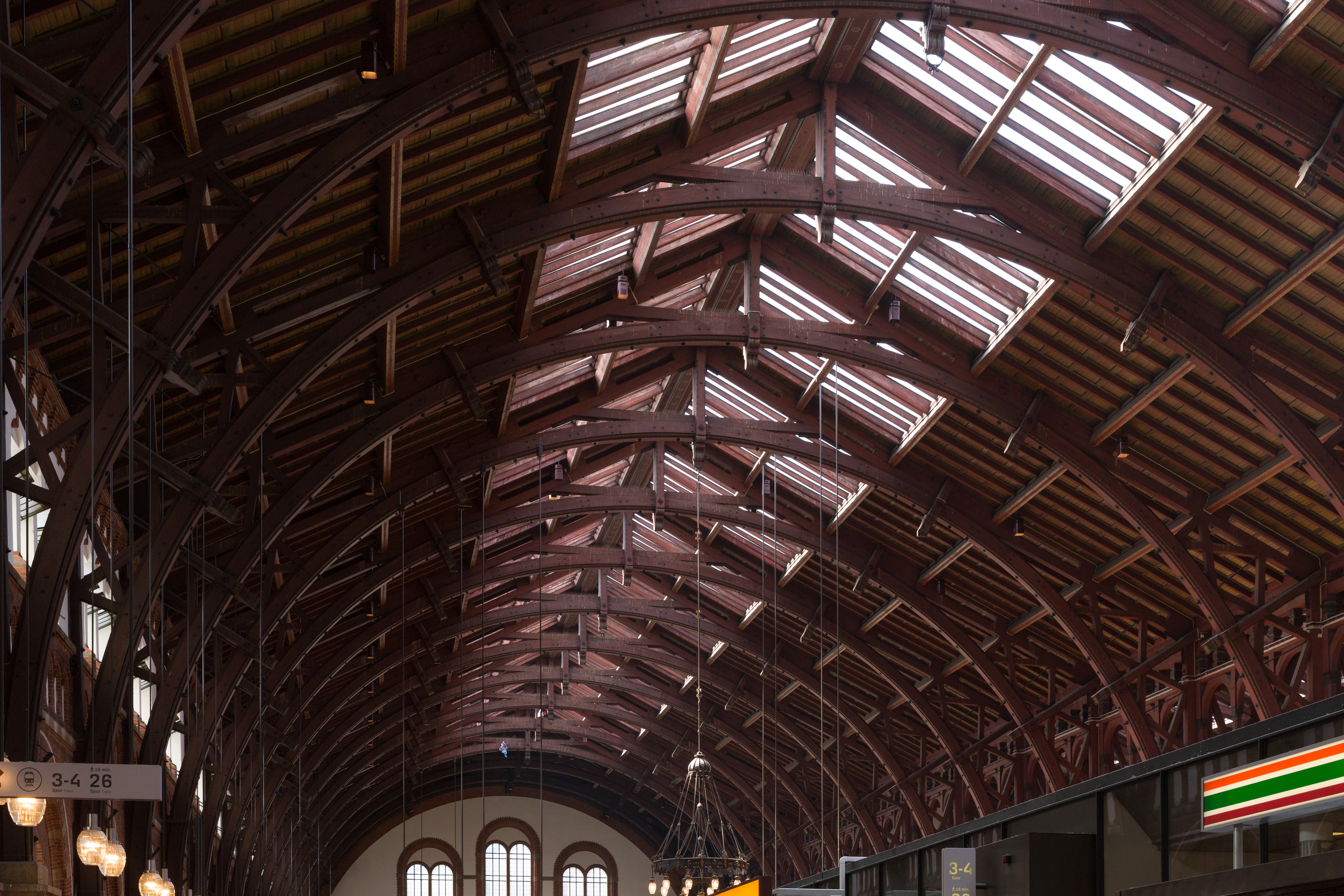
The wooden arch construction of the station halls

The station is designed in National Romantic style, a Nordic architectural style that was part of the National Romantic movement during the late 19th and early 20th centuries, and which is often considered to be a form of Art Nouveau. The prominent materials are brick, slate and granite, and a host of decorative details have been added. Inspired by Herholdt's railway station, Wenck also used a wooden arch construction both in the two departure and arrival halls and in the 6 arches over the platforms. It was probably just as much a stylistic choice, since Wenck rarely used cast iron. However, the entire railway station's foundation, basement and the platform that support the railway station site are made of reinforced concrete.

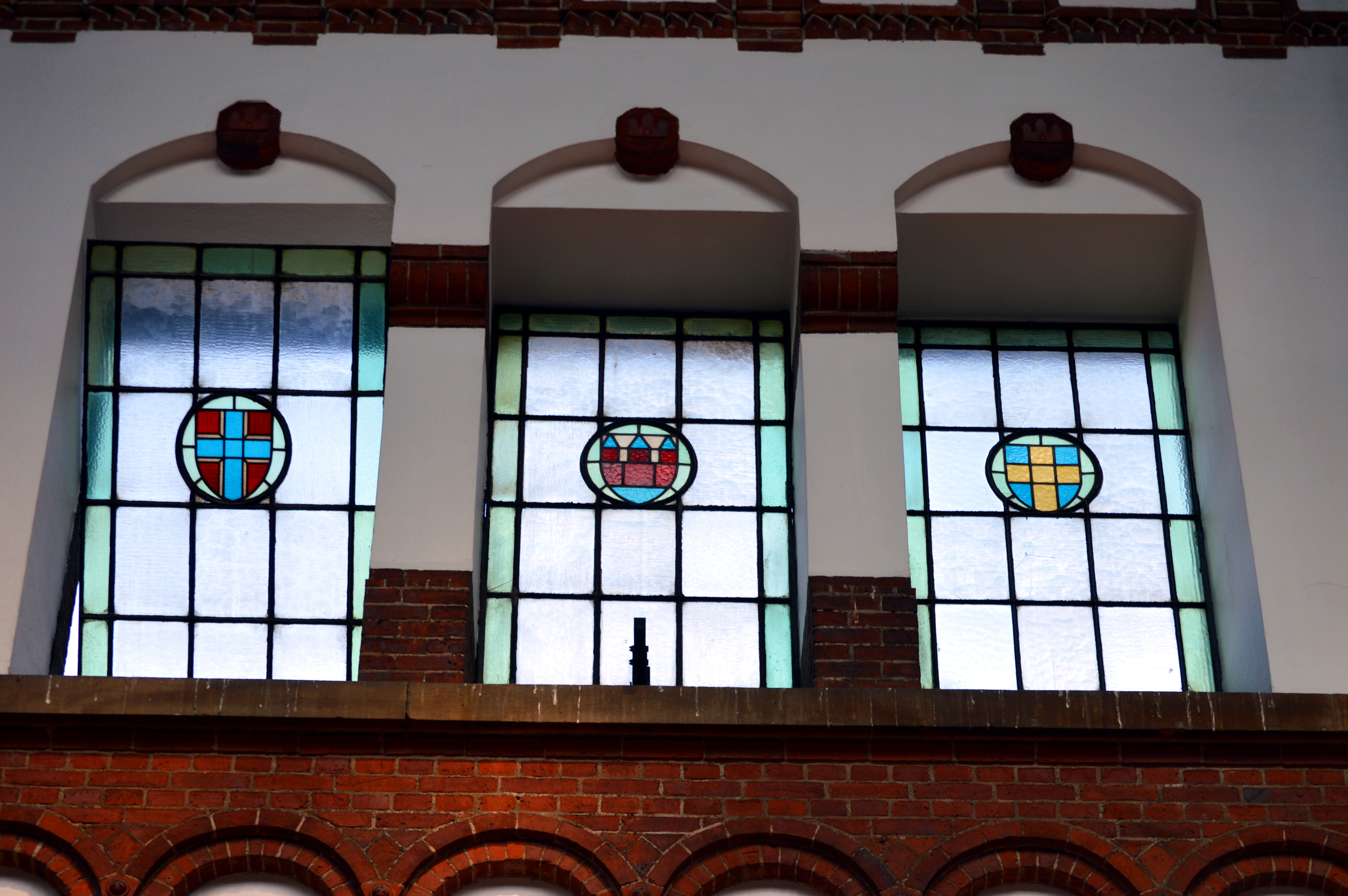
The stained glass windows with the coats of arms of Danish cities

Wenck's building is a gesamtkunstwerk, where the architect has drawn all the details; right from the Bornholm tiles, benches, the large chandeliers, of which 12 pieces originally hung (2 are set up in the hall, 2 others are found at Østerport Station), the kiosks, wrought iron signs with neat writing, door handles and brass signs with DSB logo and stained glass windows with city coats of arms from Danish cities.

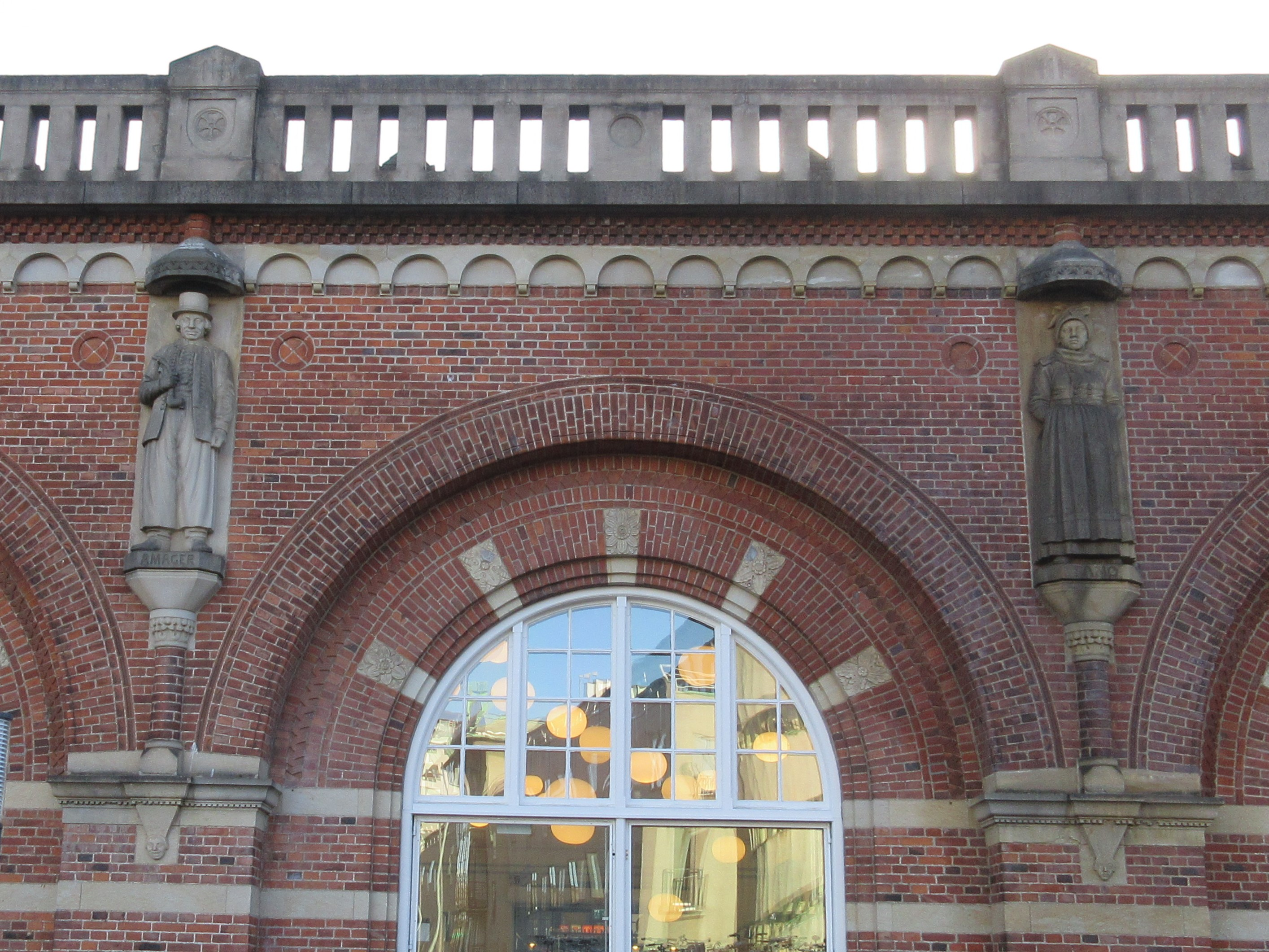
Two of the folkloristic figures on the main facade.

The Danish sculptor Jens Lund was responsible for the ten folkloristic figures of sandstone on the main facade representing persons in folk costumes from various parts of the country (1910): Amager, Fanø, Hedeboegnen, Læsø, Mols, Ringkøbing, Salling, Samsø, Skovshoved and southern Funen.

== Layout ==
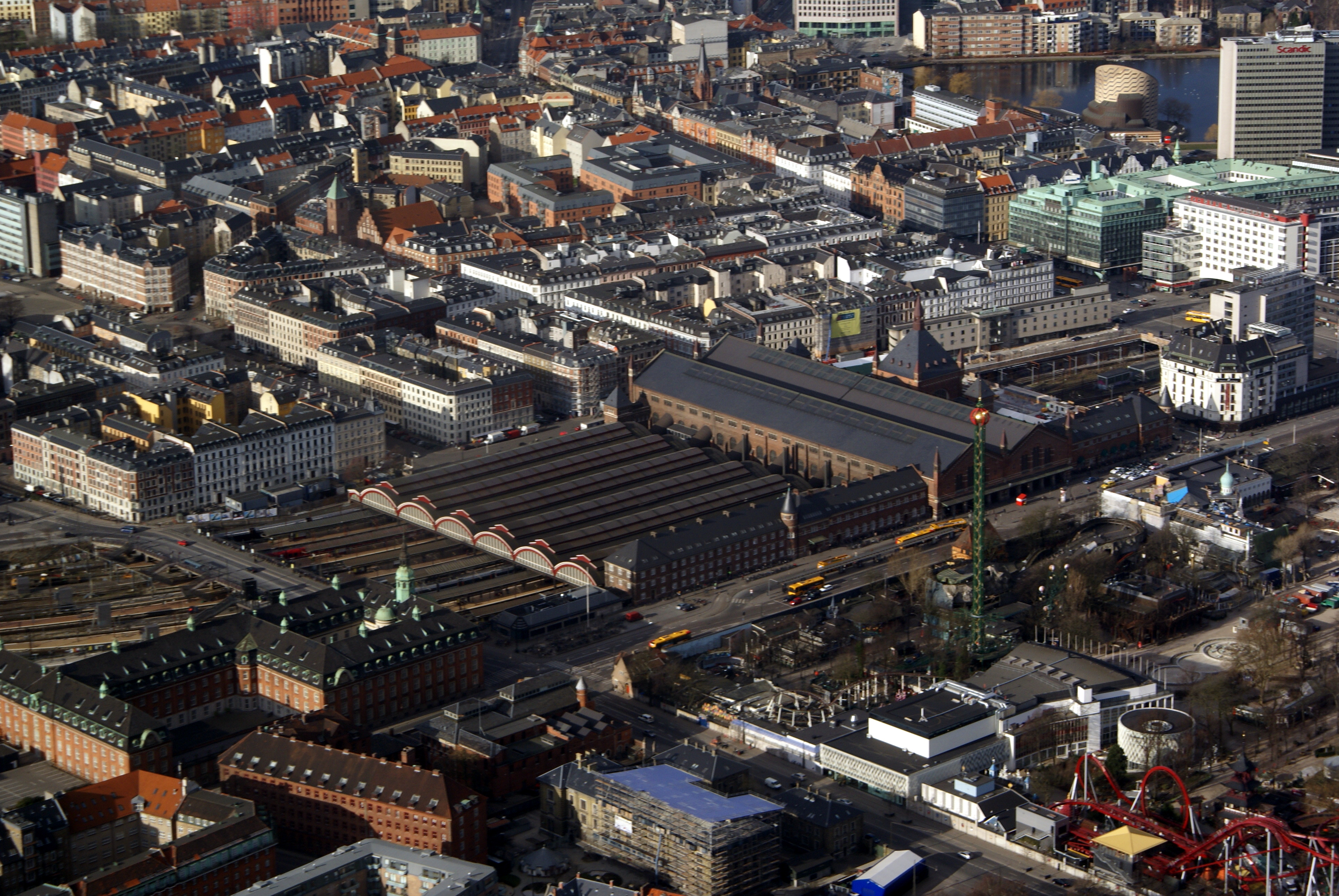
Aerial view of the station

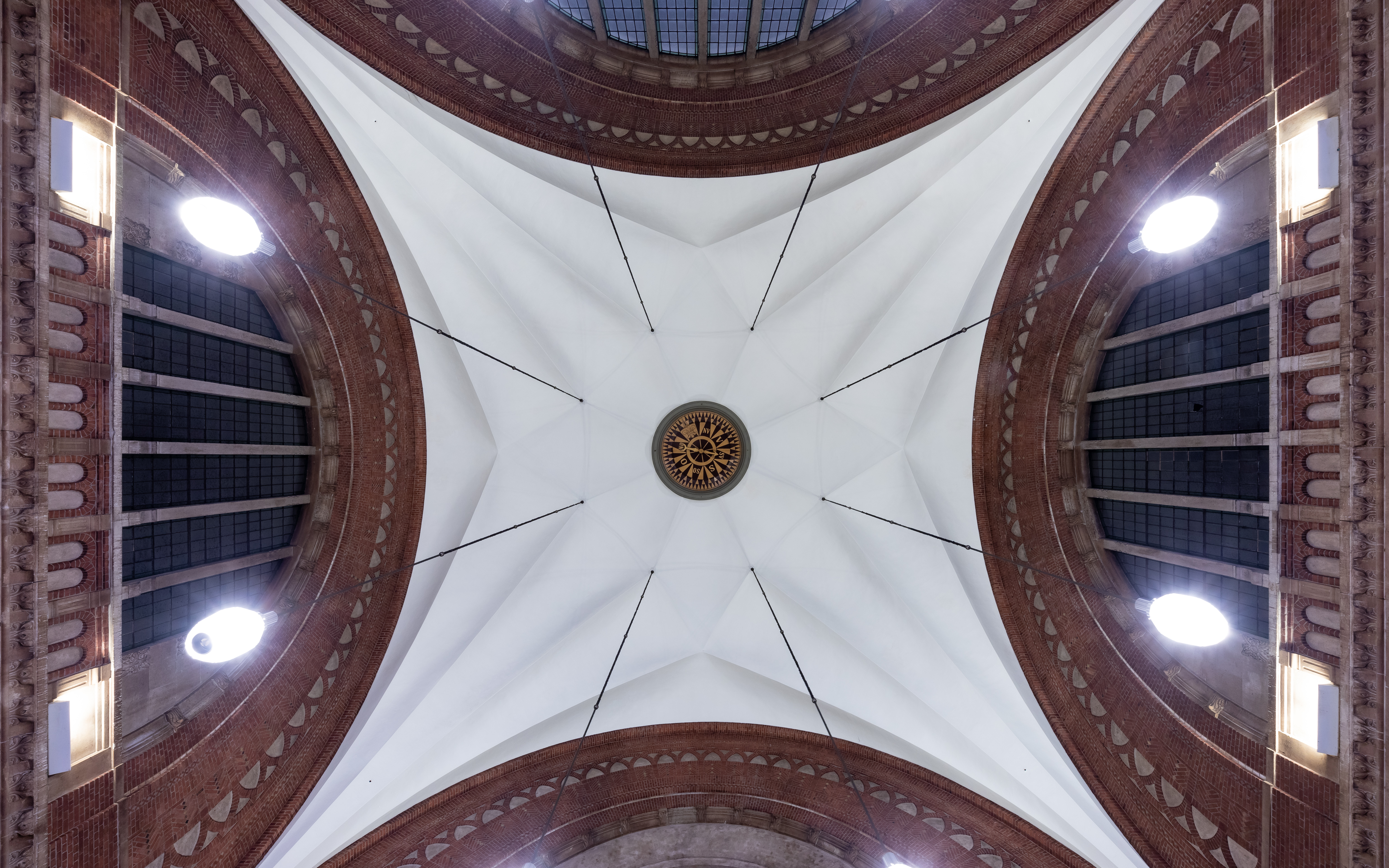
Ceiling of Vesterbrogade entrance

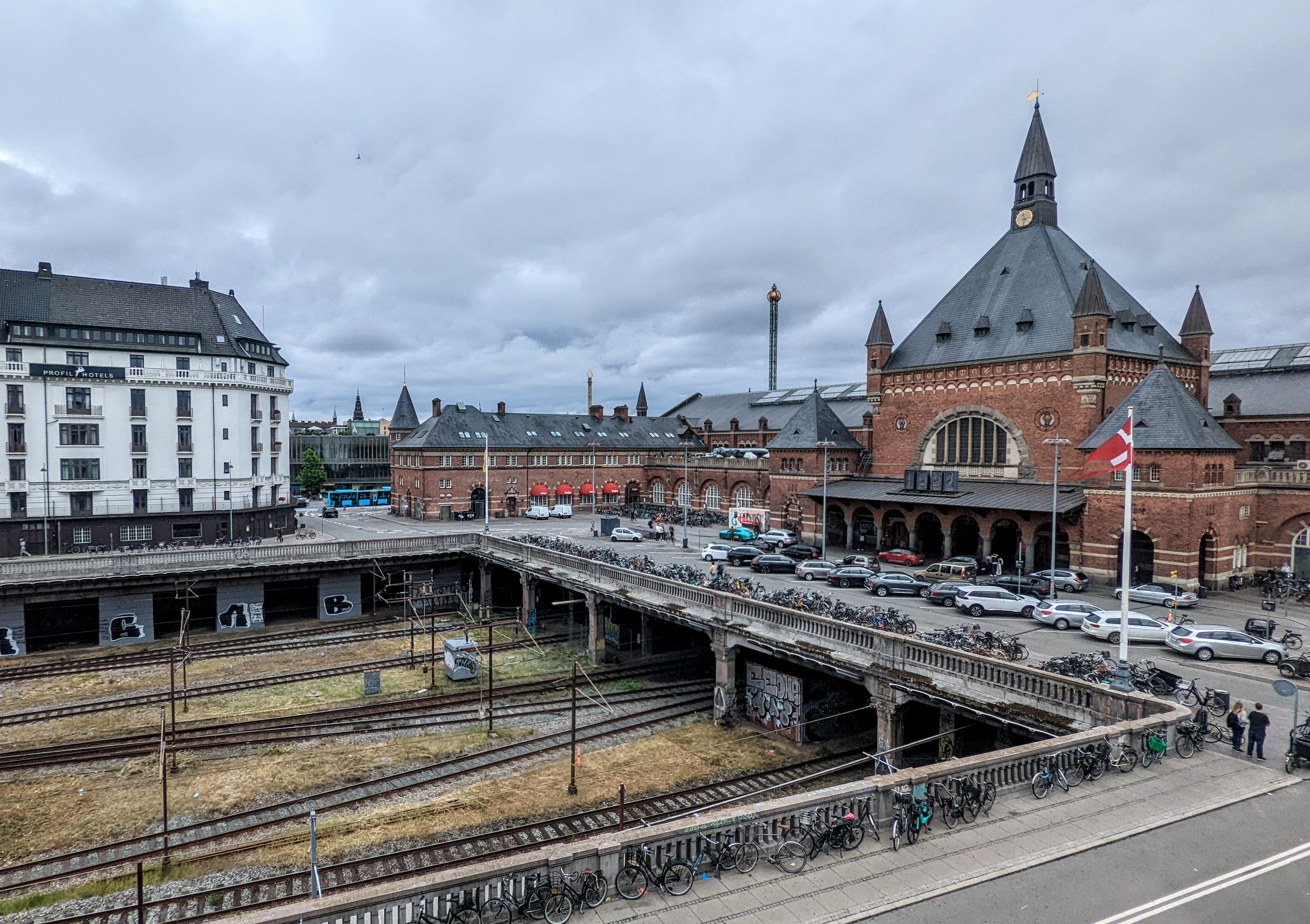
København H north side as viewed from the Hotel Astoria

The station has 7 platforms and 13 tracks. The platforms begin under the main passenger hall (and at least the S-train section, two platforms with a total of four S-train tracks, of the station can be said to begin as an underground station). A hotel (Astoria) is built above the S-train tracks in the Northern end, but the remaining tracks are uncovered below street level. (Open areas between tunnel sections were necessary to have during the era of steam trains, while the S-trains always have been electrical). In the opposite (platform) end, all platforms are covered with the typical railway arched roof. This roof is shorter than the platforms, but all tracks remain below street level and can also be accessed from the street Tietgensgade.

In addition to the original 6 island-platforms and their 12 tracks, has one additional track constructed much later. The single spare track, called track 26, was initially built for trains to southern Sweden, while Malmö C still was a terminus. It has later been used for express trains to or from Sweden or to or from Norway. After the introduction of border controls and mandatory identity checks for travel to Sweden this track was fenced and used for X2000 and intercity trains to Sweden. The extra track 26 is located 200 metres (660 ft) south of the main building and is reachable only by walking along the platform for track 4 and 5 or from a staircase from the Tietgensgade street. There is a plan to extend the length of this track and build another track on the other side of the same platform, called track 27, and improve walking access to them.

The station services the Copenhagen S-train network, but the S-train system in Copenhagen doesn't use any kind of hub at all. It is an urban transit which differs from most Metro systems mainly by being a type of railway. At the station are two platforms with four tracks (track 9–12) that are used by the S-trains only. All other trains usually use the other four platforms and eight tracks. Because Denmark uses right-hand traffic, the tracks 1–4 are mainly used for northbound traffic, and tracks 5–8 for southbound, but tracks 3–6 can also be used for trains that change direction at the station.

A pedestrian tunnel connects the train station with the metro station (M3 and M4 lines), making it easy to change between the Metro and the other train platforms without having to go up to street level and use the Central Station entrance on Reventlowsgade.

== Facilities ==
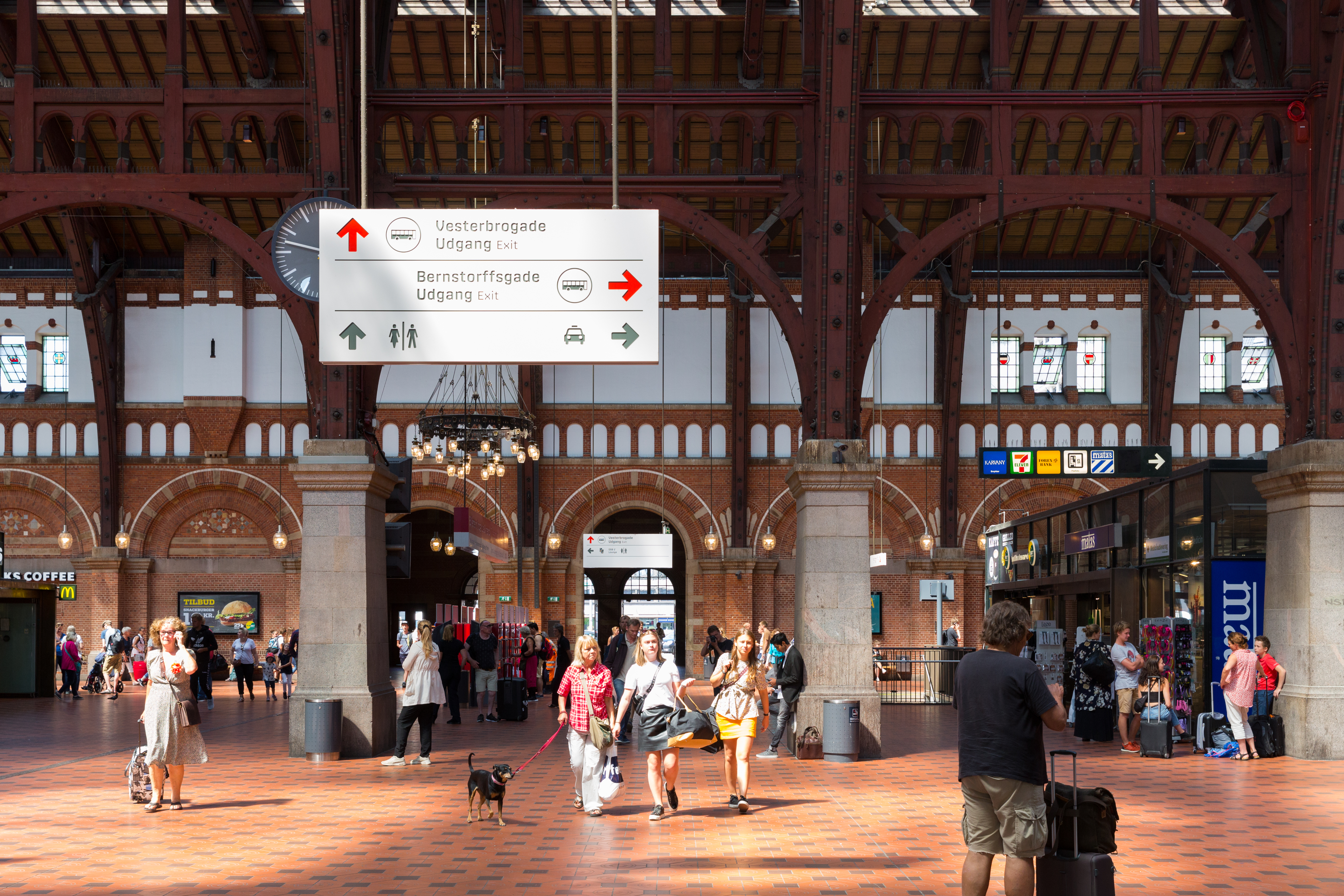
The main hall of the central station in 2018

The main concourse also functions as a marketplace where fresh fruit sellers, newsstands, a post office, ATMs, currency exchanges, hamburgers, coffee shops, restaurants and pubs can all be found. There is also a travel center for information, a police station, and windows for the in-person sale of tickets, along with access to toilets. Shower rooms are also available for a smaller fee.

== Services ==
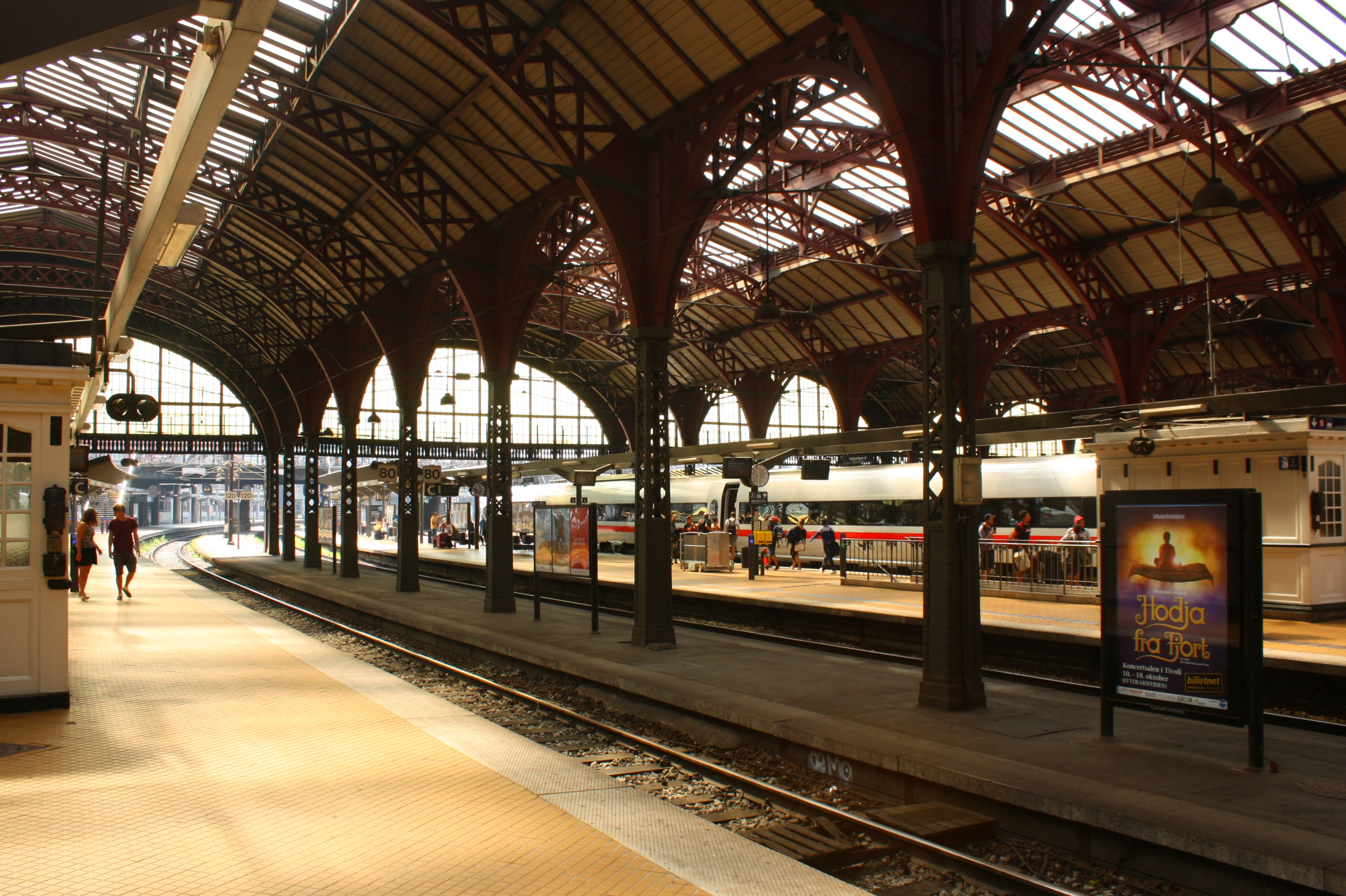
Platforms

Copenhagen Central Station provides Copenhagen with Intercity and Express trains across Denmark, as well as services to several international destinations.

Direct international trains connect to Stockholm, Hamburg, Berlin, and Prague several times a day.

Intercity trains run half-hourly from Copenhagen during daytime and serve as a link between the major cities and towns in Denmark, including Odense, Aarhus, Aalborg, Esbjerg, Thisted and Sønderborg.

Regional trains (stops at major stations within the Greater Copenhagen area) connect the main parts of Zealand to the capital. The Øresundståg regional rail network depart to southern and western Sweden every 20 minutes (24/7 service between Lund Central Station and Østerport Station).

All S-train services except the F-line stop at the station.

Since 29 September 2019 the Central station is also served by the Copenhagen Metro network's line M3 (in service 24/7), which is a circular line with 17 stations. The station is also served by the M4 line (in service 24/7), linking the Nordhavn and Sydhavn districts and serve as an interchange between the Sydhavn extension and the M3.

Long-distance buses stop at Ingerslevsgade near track 12 just south of the Tietgensgade bridge.

All public transport within Greater Copenhagen are divided into close to 100 ticket fare zones. The Central station is located in fare zone 1, which together with zones 2 and 3 constitute Copenhagen municipality and the "enclave" of Frederiksberg municipality. As the cheapest single ticket always is valid in two zones, a single ticket bought at the station is valid within the entire city centre and its inner boroughs. A ticket to Copenhagen Airport Kastrup, however, demands the payment for three zones since it is located in zone 4. A special ticket fare system exists between the Copenhagen local traffic area and the most southern part of Sweden, Skåne county.

Preceding station	DSB	Following station
Copenhagen Airport Terminus	Copenhagen-Aalborg InterCityLyn	Odense towards Aalborg Airport
Copenhagen Airport Terminus	Copenhagen-Herning-Struer InterCityLyn	Odense towards Struer
Copenhagen Airport Terminus	Copenhagen-Sønderborg InterCityLyn	Odense towards Sønderborg
Terminus	Copenhagen-Aalborg InterCity	Valby towards Aalborg Airport
Nørreport towards Østerport	Copenhagen–Esbjerg InterCity	Copenhagen South towards Esbjerg
Terminus	Copenhagen–Odense–Hamburg EuroCity	Ringsted towards Hamburg Hbf
Nørreport towards Østerport	Copenhagen–Køge–Næstved Regional train	Copenhagen South towards Næstved
Nørreport towards Helsingør	Elsinore–Copenhagen– Roskilde–Næstved Regional train	Valby towards Næstved
Nørreport towards Helsingør	Elsinore–Copenhagen– Køge–Næstved Regional train Peak hours	Copenhagen South towards Næstved
Terminus	Copenhagen–Nykøbing F Regional train	Ringsted towards Nykøbing F
Nørreport towards Østerport	Copenhagen–Kalundborg Regional train	Høje Taastrup towards Kalundborg
Nørreport towards Helsingør	Elsinore–Copenhagen– Roskilde–Holbæk Regional train	Valby towards Holbæk
Preceding station	Øresundståg	Following station
Nørreport towards Østerport	Copenhagen–Lund Øresundståg	Ørestad towards Lund C
Nørreport towards Østerport	Copenhagen–Gothenburg Øresundståg	Ørestad towards Göteborg C
Nørreport towards Østerport	Copenhagen–Kalmar Øresundståg	Ørestad towards Kalmar C
Nørreport towards Østerport	Copenhagen–Karlskrona Øresundståg	Ørestad towards Karlskrona C
Preceding station	České dráhy	Following station
Terminus	Railjet	Ringsted towards Praha hl.n.
Preceding station	SJ	Following station
Terminus	Southern Main Line	Copenhagen Airport towards Stockholm C
Preceding station	S-train	Following station
Vesterport towards Hillerød	A	Dybbølsbro towards Hundige
Vesterport towards Hillerød	A Sat–Sun	Dybbølsbro towards Køge
Vesterport towards Farum	B	Dybbølsbro towards Høje Taastrup
Vesterport towards Buddinge	Bx Peak hours	Dybbølsbro towards Høje Taastrup
Vesterport towards Klampenborg	C	Dybbølsbro towards Frederikssund
Vesterport towards Holte	E Mon–Fri	Dybbølsbro towards Køge
Vesterport towards Østerport	H Mon–Fri	Dybbølsbro towards Ballerup
Preceding station	Copenhagen Metro	Following station
Enghave Plads clockwise	M3	Rådhuspladsen counter-clockwise
Havneholmen towards Copenhagen South	M4	Rådhuspladsen towards Orientkaj

== Future ==
The station needs more capacity following the opening of the Copenhagen–Ringsted Line on 31 May 2019. The Danish Ministry of Transport has started planning of an extension: proposals include a four-track terminal station on a bridge over the present tracks, or in a tunnel under them.

== Number of travellers ==
According to the Østtællingen in 2008:

År	Antal	År	Antal	År	Antal	År	Antal
1957	15.984	1974	17.711	1991	22.771	2001	27.394
1960	14.359	1975	15.797	1992	23.167	2002	25.502
1962	15.604	1977	14.855	1993	22.825	2003	24.858
1964	14.892	1979	20.228	1995	24.371	2004	23.648
1966	16.390	1981	23.689	1996	25.739	2005	23.931
1968	17.176	1984	24.612	1997	25.801	2006	24.905
1970	17.904	1987	24.833	1998	25.977	2007	22.201
1972	18.060	1990	23.316	2000	29.150	2008	21.666

== Cultural references ==
=== In film ===
Copenhagen Central Station is used as a location at 1:12:36 in the 1975 Olsen-banden film The Olsen Gang on the Track. Egon (Ove Sprogøe) hides a suitcase in the luggage storage at Copenhagen Central Station in The Olsen Gang Outta Sight (1977) and the lost luggage department is also used as a location later in the same film.

== See also ==
- List of Copenhagen Metro stations
- List of Copenhagen S-train stations
- List of railway stations in Denmark
- Rail transport in Denmark
- History of rail transport in Denmark
- Transportation in Copenhagen
- Transportation in Denmark
- Banedanmark
- Danish State Railways
