= Copenhagen Airport railway station =

Railway station serving Copenhagen Airport, Denmark

Coordinates: 55°37′47″N 12°38′57″E

Københavns Lufthavn
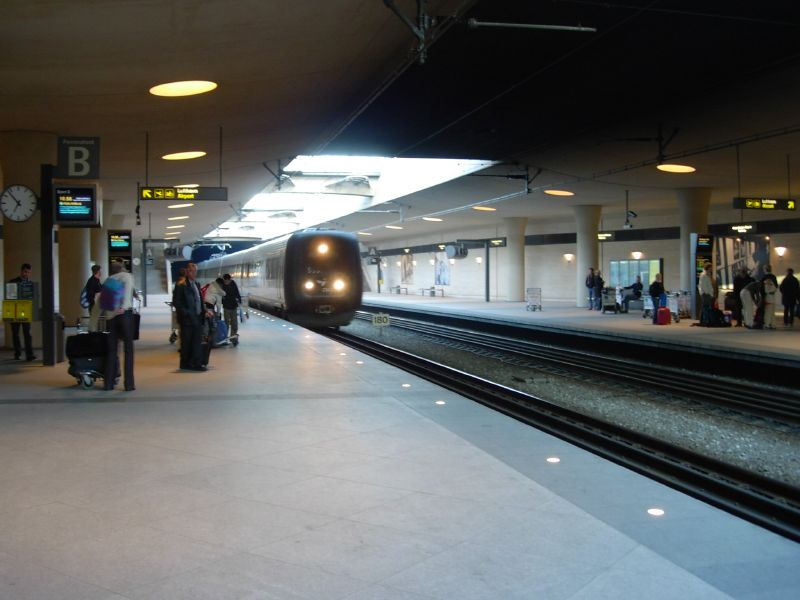
- Copenhagen Airport railway station in 2005

General information
- Location: Terminal 3; 2770 Kastrup; Tårnby Municipality; Denmark
- Elevation: 4.5 metres (15 ft)
- System: Main line and Copenhagen Metro
- Owner: DSB (station infrastructure); Banedanmark (rail infrastructure)
- Lines: Øresund Line
- Platforms: 4
- Tracks: 4
- Train operators: DSB; SJ; Skånetrafiken; Metroselskabet

Construction
- Structure type: Below grade
- Accessible: Yes

Other information
- Station code: Cph
Location

Copenhagen Airport railway station (Danish: Københavns Lufthavn Station) is a railway station in Tårnby, Denmark, serving Copenhagen Airport. It is located below ground directly under the check-in and arrival area in the airport's Terminal 3.

The station is served by DSB’s regional trains, as well as the Øresundståg network (which links it to southern Sweden). The nearby Lufthavnen metro station is served by the Copenhagen Metro’s line M2. The stations take their names from Copenhagen Airport, to which they are connected. It is located in fare zone 4.

== History ==
The station opened on 27 September 1998, and was subsequently reconstructed and reopened on 28 September 2007, with a connection to the Copenhagen Metro opening the following month.

Temporarily from 4 January 2016 to 4 May 2017, Sweden required train and bus transport companies entering Sweden to perform full identity check of every passenger, because of the European migrant crisis. For that reason the Southern platform was used only for departures to Sweden, with border checks at openings in fence erected along the platform. All arrivals and all departures to Denmark used the Northern platform. Only the regional trains towards Helsingør and Sweden used Copenhagen Airport station, all other trains did not go here during this period.

In April of 2026, two new platforms were opened at the station. Located outside north of the previous platforms and below the Lufthavnen metro station, tracks that were previously used primarily for freight trains had platforms added to them.

== Metro station ==
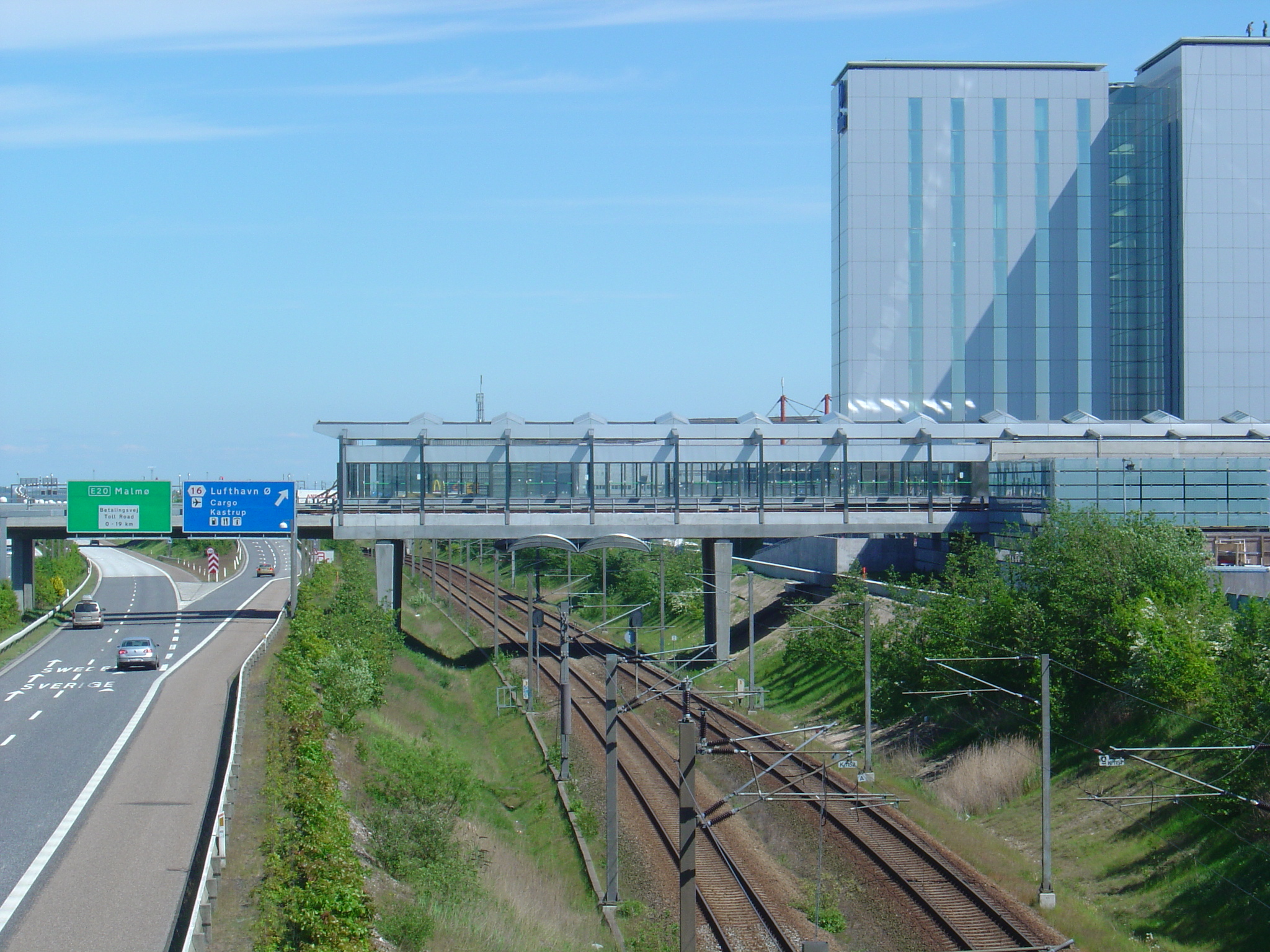
Lufthavnen metro station

Lufthavnen (‘Airport’) metro station is located slightly further off than the railway station, at the far end of Terminal 3 on the level 2. The metro connects to Nørreport Station and Vanløse station. The station is linked to Ørestad station on the M1 line by DSB regional trains.

== Services ==
The station is served by the following types of trains:

- Local trains between Copenhagen Central Station and Malmö Central Station. These trains also stop at Tårnby and Ørestad en route to Copenhagen, and at Hyllie and Triangeln en route to Malmö. To Copenhagen every 10 minutes, and to Malmö every 20 minutes.
- Regional trains on Zealand and southern Sweden. Connects to Klampenborg, Helsingør, Lund, Helsingborg, Landskrona and Hässleholm.
- Intercity trains to the rest of Denmark including Odense, Fredericia, Aarhus, Esbjerg and Aalborg.
- Intercity trains in southern Sweden connects to Gothenburg, Kalmar and Karlskrona (see Øresundståg).
- High-speed X 2000 trains to Stockholm.

| Preceding station | DSB | Following station |
|---|---|---|
| Terminus | Copenhagen-Aalborg InterCityLyn | Copenhagen Central towards Aalborg Airport |
| Terminus | Copenhagen-Herning-Struer InterCityLyn | Copenhagen Central towards Struer |
| Terminus | Copenhagen-Sønderborg InterCityLyn | Copenhagen Central towards Sønderborg |
| Terminus | Copenhagen–Slagelse Regional train | Tårnby towards Slagelse |
| Preceding station | Øresundståg | Following station |
| Tårnby towards Østerport | Copenhagen–Lund Øresundståg | Hyllie towards Lund C |
| Tårnby towards Østerport | Copenhagen–Gothenburg Øresundståg | Hyllie towards Göteborg C |
| Tårnby towards Østerport | Copenhagen–Kalmar Øresundståg | Hyllie towards Kalmar C |
| Tårnby towards Østerport | Copenhagen–Karlskrona Øresundståg | Hyllie towards Karlskrona C |
| Preceding station | SJ | Following station |
| Malmö C towards Stockholm C | Southern Main Line | Köpenhamn H Terminus |
| Malmö C towards Stockholm C | EuroNight | Odense towards Hamburg Hbf or Berlin Hbf |

== See also ==
- List of airport railway stations
- List of railway stations in Denmark
- Rail transport in Denmark
- History of rail transport in Denmark
- Transport in Copenhagen
- Transport in Denmark
