= Palads Teatret =

Danish cinema

Coordinates: 55°40′35″N 12°33′48″E

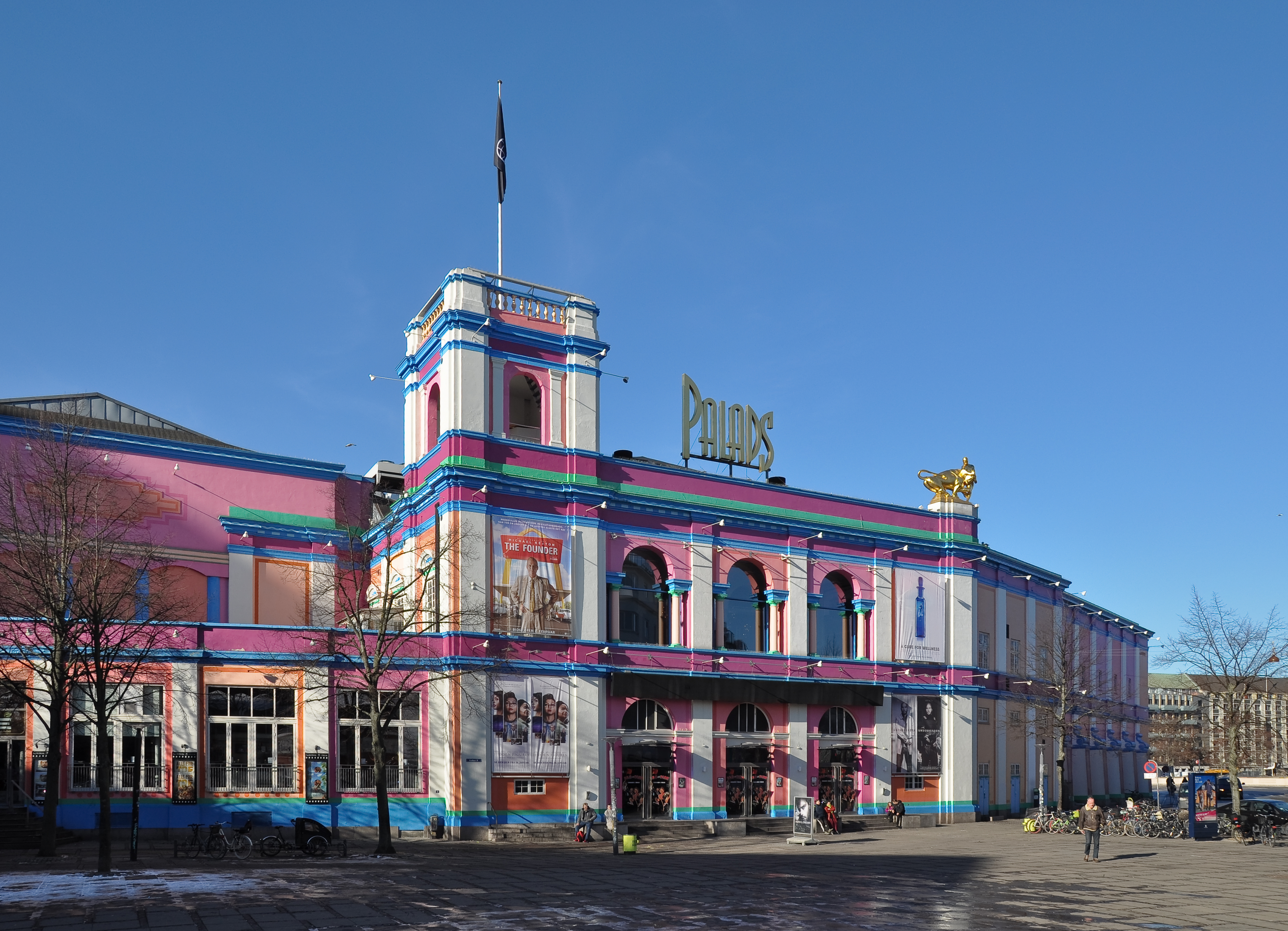
Palads, Copenhagen

Palads Teatret (the Palads Cinema), also known simply as the Palads, is a cinema operated by Nordisk Film in Copenhagen, Denmark. It offers a wide selection of films in its 17 auditoriums, more than any other Danish cinema.

== History ==
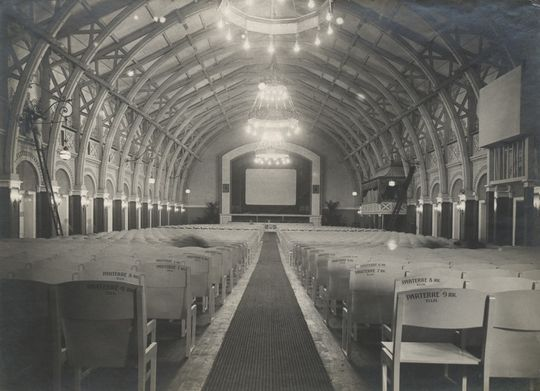
The first Palads Cinema in the old railway station

The Palads was established in Copenhagen's former central railway station on Axeltorv which had ceased operations in 1911 following the construction of a new station. After major reconstruction work, the cinema opened on 18 October 1912. With 1780 seats and a 30-man orchestra, it was Scandinavia's largest entertainment centre. The former station building was completely demolished in 1917, providing space for today's building designed by Andreas Clemmensen and Johan Nielsen. Kai Nielsen's sculpture of Ursus and the Bull was positioned on the roof from the beginning but was not gilded until 1949.

In 1955, the cinema was comprehensively renovated under the supervision of Holger Pind with new ventilation, carpeting, seating, rosewood wall panelling and the installation of a CinemaScope screen 12 m (39 ft) wide. In the mid-1970s, the cinema suffered from diminishing audiences threatening its viability. Drawing on the experience of the Marignan Concorde cinema in Paris which had been divided up into six auditoriums, the Palads was restructured into 12 auditoriums in 1978. Despite general scepticism, the alterations proved a huge success attracting 57,921 visitors in just one week. In September 1979, a further five auditoriums were opened in the basement. The interior was redecorated throughout in blue and grey with red seating.

In 1989, the outside of the building was painted in vivid pastel colours by the artist Poul Gernes, livening up its appearance, especially when illuminated in the evening.

== Recent developments ==
Today the cinema consists of 17 auditoriums with a total of 2,600 seats. In 2010, the foyer was completely renovated, reflecting modern trends in design and technology. The venue is also used for a variety of other events such as sports functions and ballet performances. The cinema currently offers the widest selection of films in Denmark, covering the interests of all age groups. It is fitted with the latest technical equipment including Digital 3D.

== In popular culture ==
The building has been used as a location in the films Man elsker kun een gang (1945) and Olsen-banden går amok (1973).

== Night club ==
At the end of The Palads Building, Axeltorv 5, has since the 70s housed various nightclubs, outstanding was the Daddy's Dance Hall, which from 1975 to 1978 was a live music venue, distinctive for their line in the music program were two concerts with the Sex Pistols in 1977.
