= Tårnby railway station =

Railway station in Greater Copenhagen, Denmark

Coordinates: 55°37′47″N 12°36′07″E

Tårnby
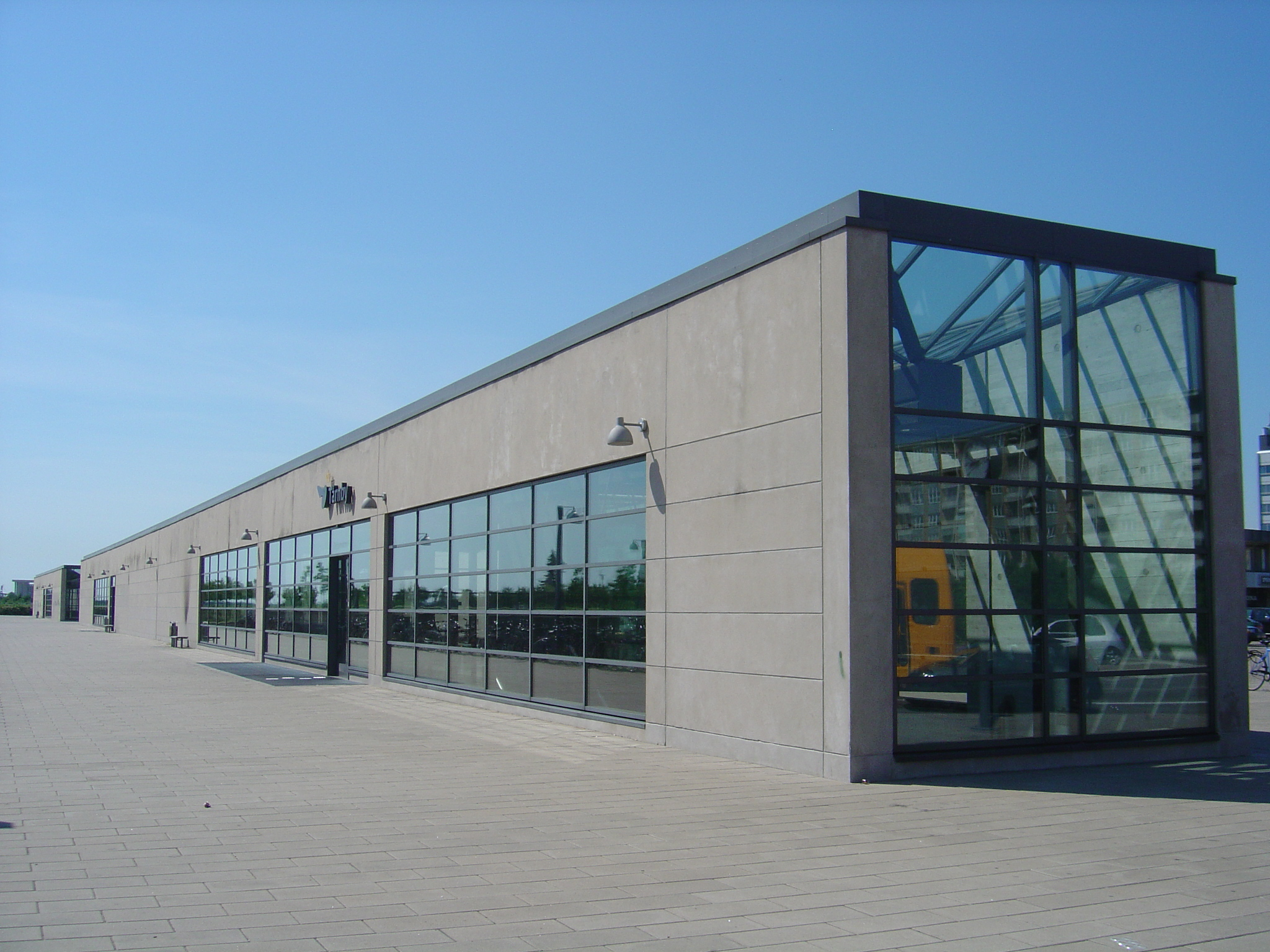
- Tårnby station in 2007

General information
- Location: Englandsvej 320; Tårnby, 2770 Kastrup; Tårnby Municipality; Denmark
- Elevation: 3.8 metres (12 ft)
- Owner: DSB (station infrastructure); Banedanmark (rail infrastructure)
- Operator: DSB
- Line: Øresund Line
- Platforms: 1
- Tracks: 2
- Train operators: DSB; Skånetrafiken

Construction
- Structure type: Underground
- Architect: KHR Arkitekter

Services
Preceding station	DSB	Following station
Copenhagen Airport Terminus	Copenhagen–Slagelse Regional train	Ørestad towards Slagelse
Preceding station	Øresundståg	Following station
Ørestad towards Østerport	Copenhagen–Lund Øresundståg	Copenhagen Airport towards Lund C
Ørestad towards Østerport	Copenhagen–Gothenburg Øresundståg	Copenhagen Airport towards Göteborg C
Ørestad towards Østerport	Copenhagen–Kalmar Øresundståg	Copenhagen Airport towards Kalmar C
Ørestad towards Østerport	Copenhagen–Karlskrona Øresundståg	Copenhagen Airport towards Karlskrona C
Location

Tårnby station (Danish pronunciation: [ˈtsʰɒːnˌpyˀ stæˈɕoˀn]) is an underground railway station on the Øresund Line. It is located in Tårnby, on the island of Amager. Tårnby is a municipality of its own, but its build-up parts are included in Copenhagen's urban area. Travels from this station are included in the common ticket system in and around Copenhagen. Departures take place every approximately 10 minutes in both directions. The station building is owned by Sund & Bælt. There are two tracks located at an island platform which is 320 metres (1,050 feet) long, around 15 metres (50 feet) wide and its tracks are located at a depth of 6 metres (20 feet) below the surrounding ground level.

Designed by KHR Arkitekter, the station opened in 2000 when the line was inaugurated.

== See also ==
- List of railway stations in Denmark
