= Axeltorv =

Square in Copenhagen

Axel Torv
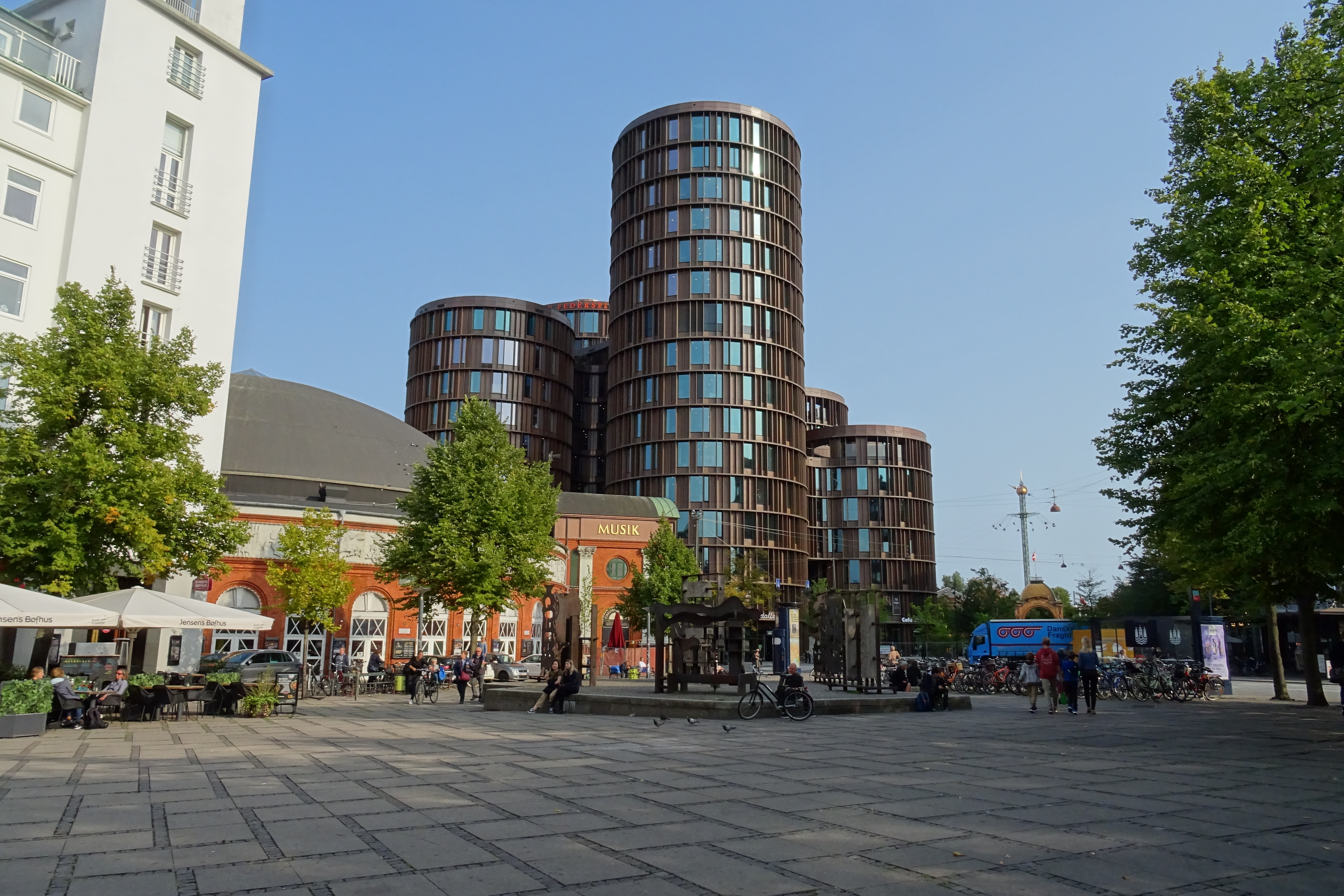
- Location: Indre By, Copenhagen, Denmark
- Postal code: 1609
- Coordinates: 55°40′33.6″N 12°33′51.48″E

Axeltorv is a public square in central Copenhagen, Denmark, located across the street from Tivoli Gardens' main entrance on Vesterbrogade.

== History ==
Axeltorv was inaugurated on 8 November 1917. The grounds were formerly part of Farigmagsvej and used as a plaza in front of the main entrance to Copenhagen's second Central Station which had been built in 1864.

The site had for decades been dominated by National Scala, an entertainment venue situated on the eastern corner of the street. On the opposite corner was a small round pavilion, Centralpavilionen, which sold lottery tickets.

The square was established when the street was moved to its current location in connection with the opening of the Boulevard Line. It takes its name after Bishop Absalon, Copenhagen's founder, whose (little used) Danish name was Axel.

== Notable buildings and residents ==
Axelborg was completed in 1920. Originally a bank headquarters, it now houses the Danish Agriculture and Food Council.

The Circus Building is from 1886.

The Palads Cinema opened in the former central station in 1912 but its current building is from 1917.

The former Copenhagen Waterworks, built on a site between the Boulevard Line and Studiestræde, though barely visible from the square, also has its address on Axeltorv (No. 12).

== The Scala Project ==
The Scala Building was demolished in 2012. An office complex designed by Lundgaard & Tranberg consisting of five cylinders of varying height and interconnected by skyways, positioned on a one-storey plinth, now stands on the site. The project has also proposed a renovation of the square that will enhance Fortification Ring's character of being a "green belt"surrounding the city centre.

== Sculptures ==
A 12.5 metre long water basin with nine bronze amphoras was installed in the square in 1991. It was designed by Mogens Møller in collaboration with the architect Mogens Breyen and is called Zodiac.

Robert Jacobsen's sculpture De Syv Aksler (1984) was installed in front of the Palads Cinema in 1987. It commemorates the escape of Jews from Denmark during World War II. It consists of seven abstract iron sculptures on a star-shaped, cobbled plinth.

Kai Nielsen's sculpture of Ursus and the Bull was positioned on the roof of the Palads Cinema in 1917 but was not gilded until 1949.

== Gallery ==
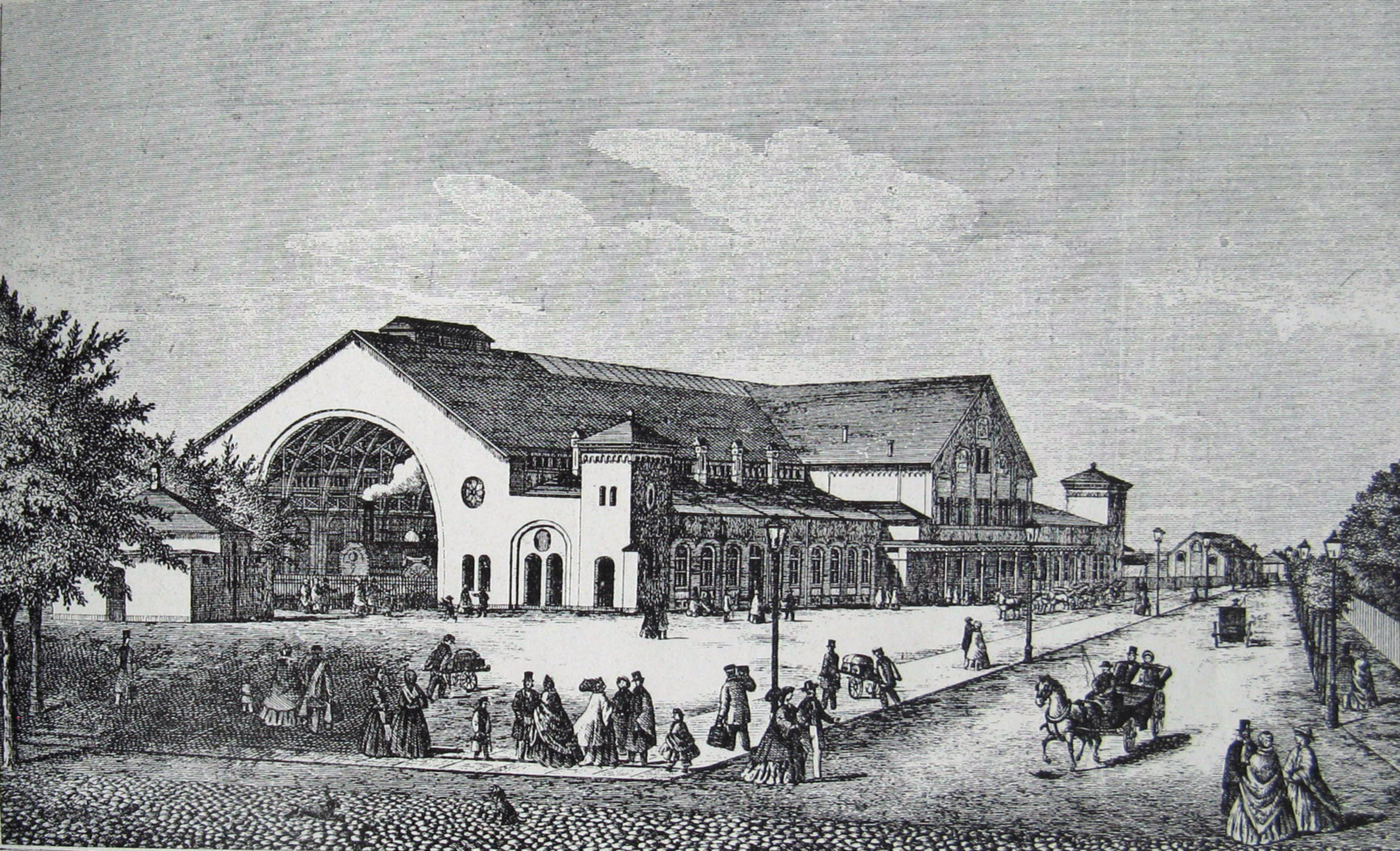
Copenhagen's former central station

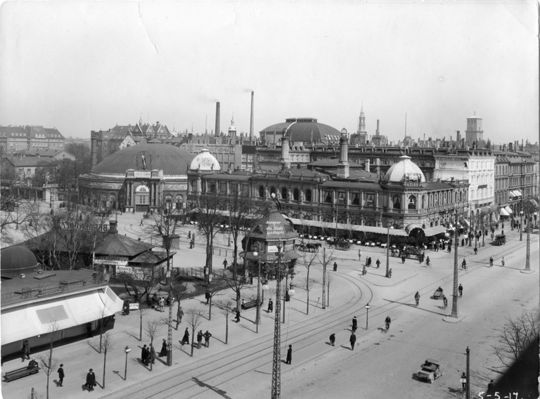
The site just before the square was built

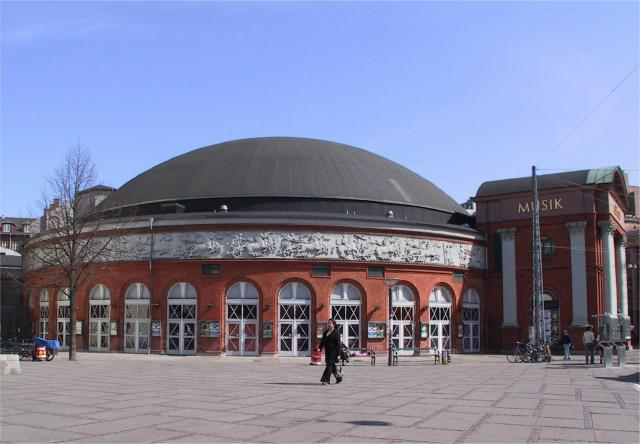
The Circus Building

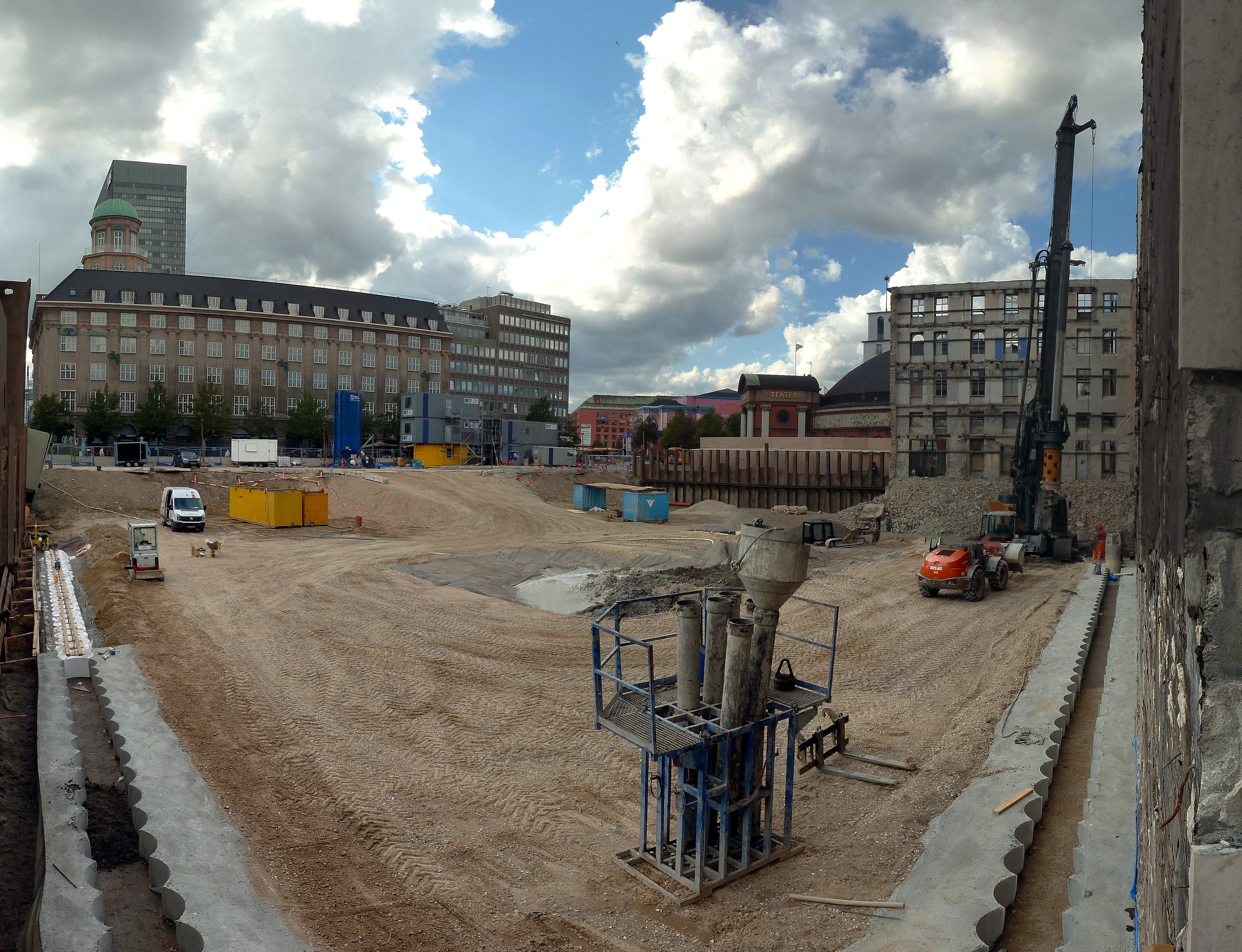
The construction site of the Scala Project

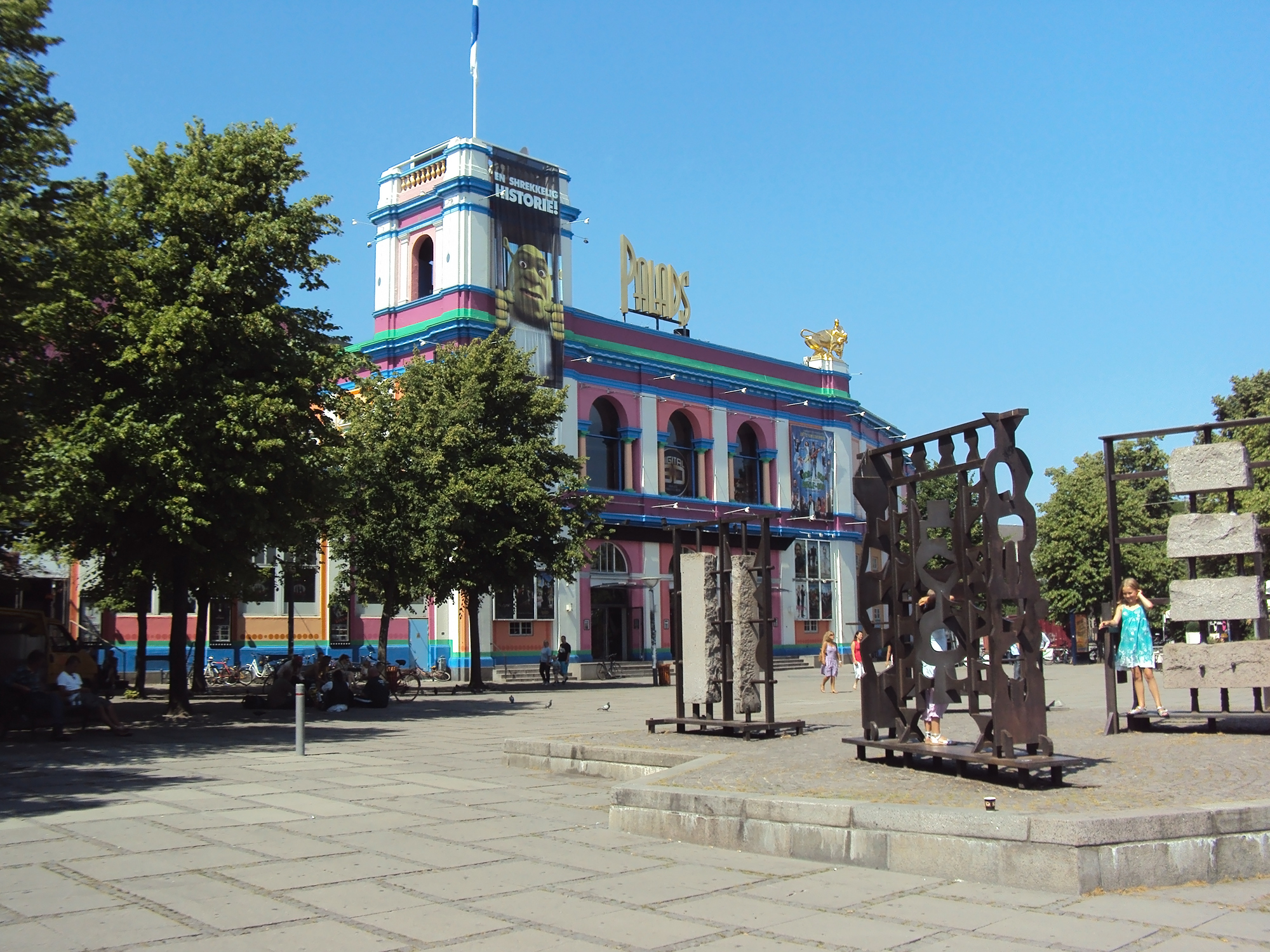
Robert Jacobsen's sculpture in front of the Palads Cinema
