= Ørestad railway station =

Railway and rapid transit station in Copenhagen, Denmark

Coordinates: 55°37′43″N 12°34′45″E

Ørestad
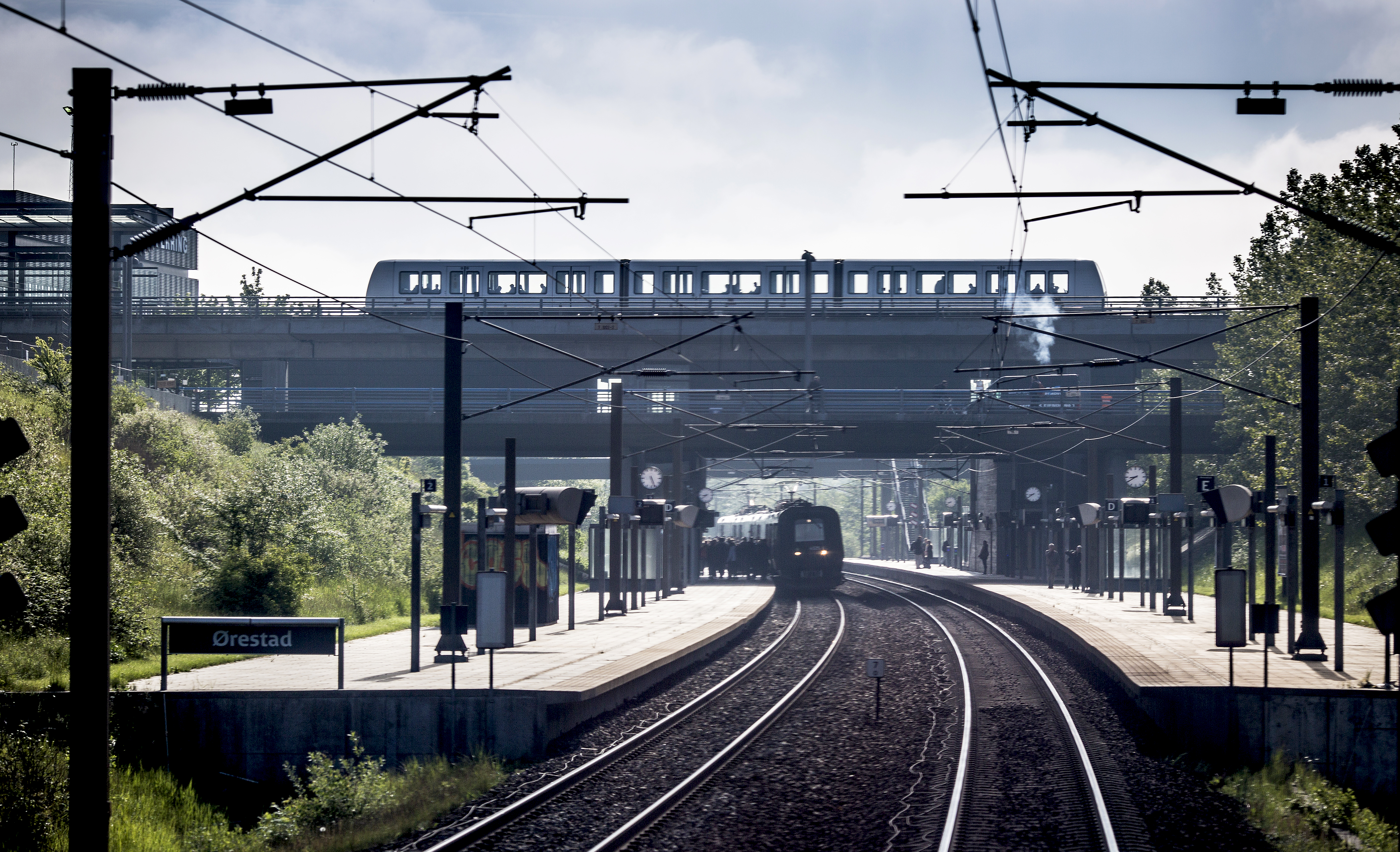
- Ørestad station in 2014

General information
- Location: Ørestads Boulevard 89; 2300 Copenhagen S Copenhagen Municipality; Denmark
- Elevation: 4.7 metres (15 ft)
- Owner: DSB (station infrastructure); Banedanmark (rail infrastructure)
- Platforms: 2 side platforms (Regional service); 1 island platform (Metro)
- Tracks: 4
- Train operators: DSB; Skånetrafiken; Snälltåget; Metroselskabet

Construction
- Structure type: Trench (Regional service); Elevated (Metro)
- Platform levels: 3
- Accessible: yes

Other information
- Station code: Øre
- Fare zone: 3

History
- Opened: 19 October 2002 (Metro)

Services
| Preceding station | DSB | Following station |
|---|---|---|
| Tårnby towards Copenhagen Airport | Copenhagen–Slagelse Regional train | Copenhagen South towards Slagelse |
| Preceding station | Long distance trains | Following station |
| Malmö Central towards Stockholm Central | Snälltåget seasonal | Hamburg Hbf towards Berlin Hbf |
| Preceding station | Øresundståg | Following station |
| Copenhagen Central towards Østerport | Copenhagen–Lund Øresundståg | Tårnby towards Lund C |
| Copenhagen Central towards Østerport | Copenhagen–Gothenburg Øresundståg | Tårnby towards Göteborg C |
| Copenhagen Central towards Østerport | Copenhagen–Kalmar Øresundståg | Tårnby towards Kalmar C |
| Copenhagen Central towards Østerport | Copenhagen–Karlskrona Øresundståg | Tårnby towards Karlskrona C |
| Preceding station | Copenhagen Metro | Following station |
| Bella Center towards Vanløse | M1 | Vestamager Terminus |
Location

Ørestad station is a main line and rapid transit railway station serving the development area of Ørestad in the district of Amager Vest in Copenhagen, Denmark. The station is a junction station served by both the Copenhagen Metro and regional trains. The penultimate stop of the M1 Line, it is located in zone 3 in the west-central section of the island of Amager.

== Location ==
Ørestad station is one of the southernmost stations of the Copenhagen Metro system. Specifically, it lies on a viaduct paralleling the eastern edge of Ørestads Boulevard at its intersection with Arne Jacobsens Allé.

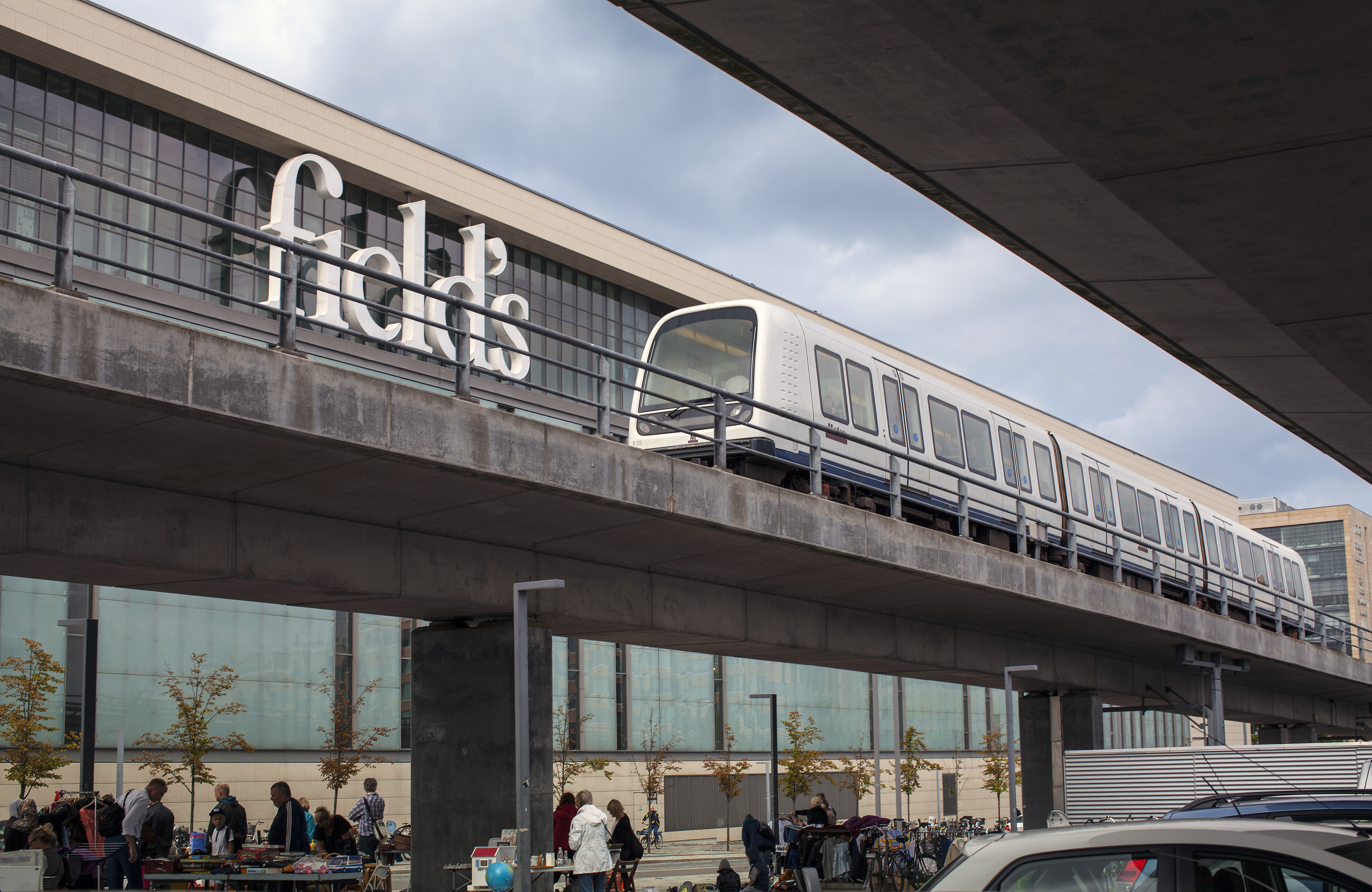
Ørestad Metro Station

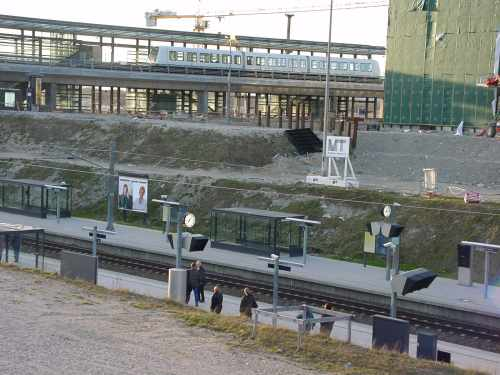

=== Transit-oriented development ===
One of six Metro stations within the Ørestad redevelopment area, significant mixed-use development and construction is underway in the area immediately surrounding the station. As the transfer point between the Metro and regional trains, Ørestad station and its environs, termed the Ørestad City district, will see the most intense levels of development, with a focus a new Ørestad Downtown.

The two most significant buildings in the area are the Ferring Building and Field's, one of Scandinavia's largest department stores at 178,000 square metres (1,920,000 sq ft). Surrounding Field's is the Ørestad Downtown, which include 205,000 square metres (2,210,000 sq ft) of commercial space. Much of the Downtown was designed by Daniel Liebeskind. Ørestad station's residential transit-oriented development is scattered in the form of smaller apartment complexes, including City Husene, Parkhusene, and Sejlhuset.

== History ==
The railway station opened in 2000. The Metro station opened in 2002.

== See also ==
- List of Copenhagen Metro stations
- List of railway stations in Denmark
