= Nørrebroparken =

Park in Copenhagen, Denmark

Coordinates: 55°41′45″N 12°32′32″E

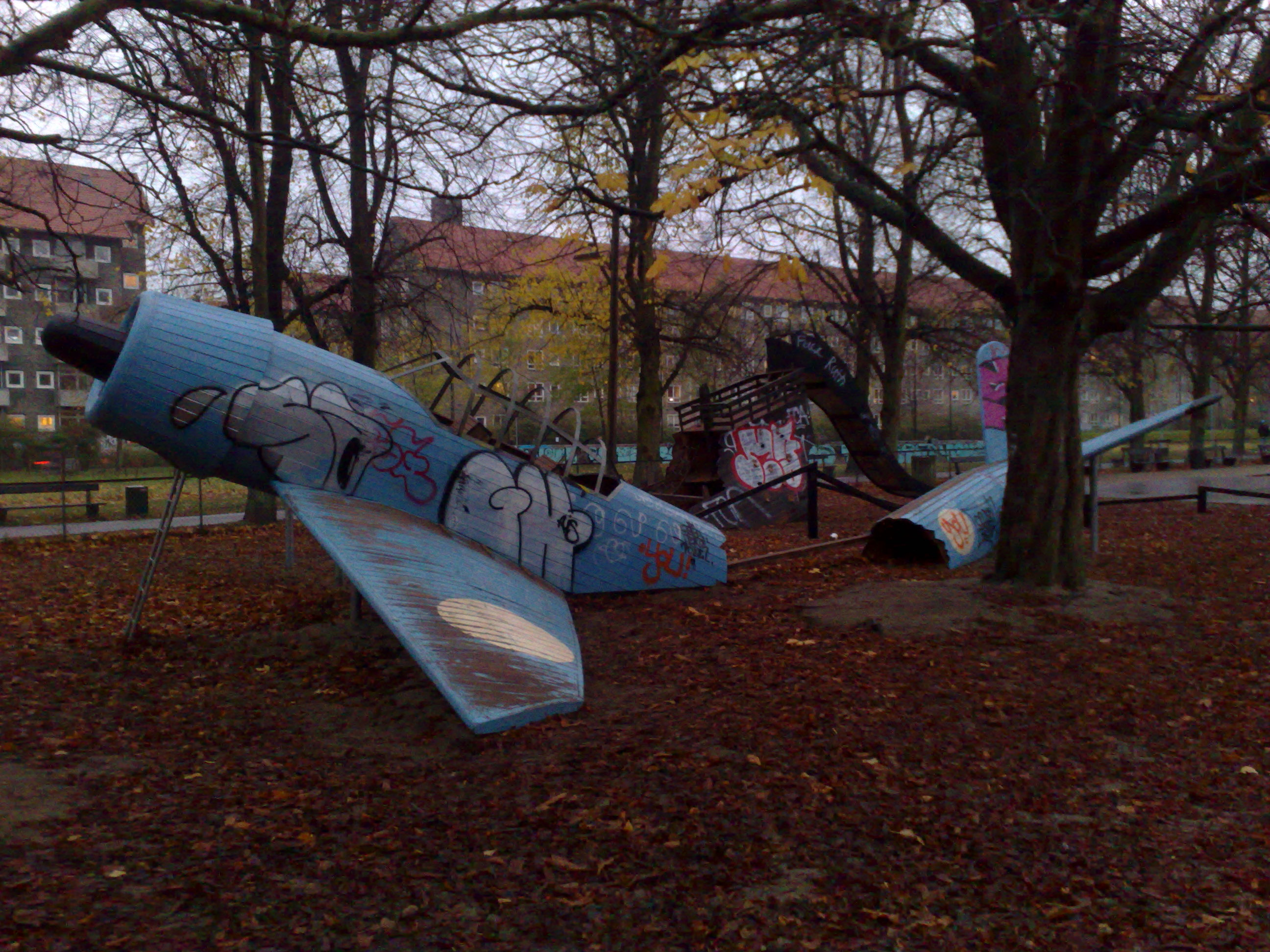
Playground modeled after a plane crash

Nørrebroparken is a park in Copenhagen, Denmark. The park is located in the area Nørrebro and was renovated in 2007. It sparked controversy when the construction of the Copenhagen Metro City Ring used the park as a building site taking up around half the area of the park from 2009 to 2018. Nørrebroparken is located north of Stefansgade and continues as Hørsholmparken (between Stefansgade and Jagtvej) and Brohusparken (between Jagtvej and Ågade).
