= Absalonsgade =

Street in Copenhagen Municipality, Denmark

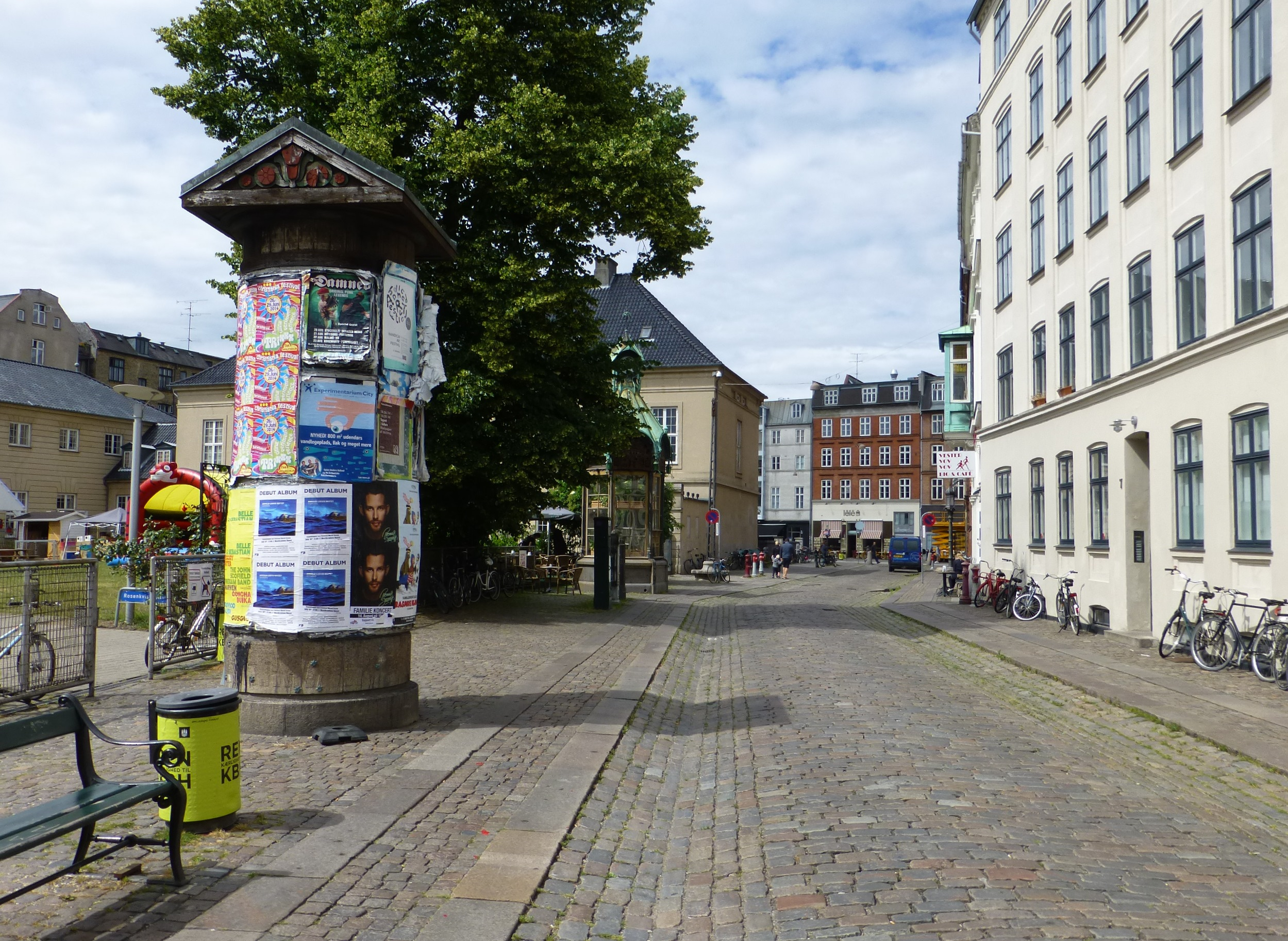
Absalonsgade with Vesterbrogade in the background

Absalonsgade is a street in the Vesterbro district of Copenhagen, Denmark. It runs from Vesterbrogade in the north to Sønder Boulevard in the south and passes Istedgade on the way. The Museum of Copenhagen has a small display of historical street furniture next to its former building at the corner with Vesterbrogade. One of two entrances to the Shooting Range Garden is located in the street.

== History ==
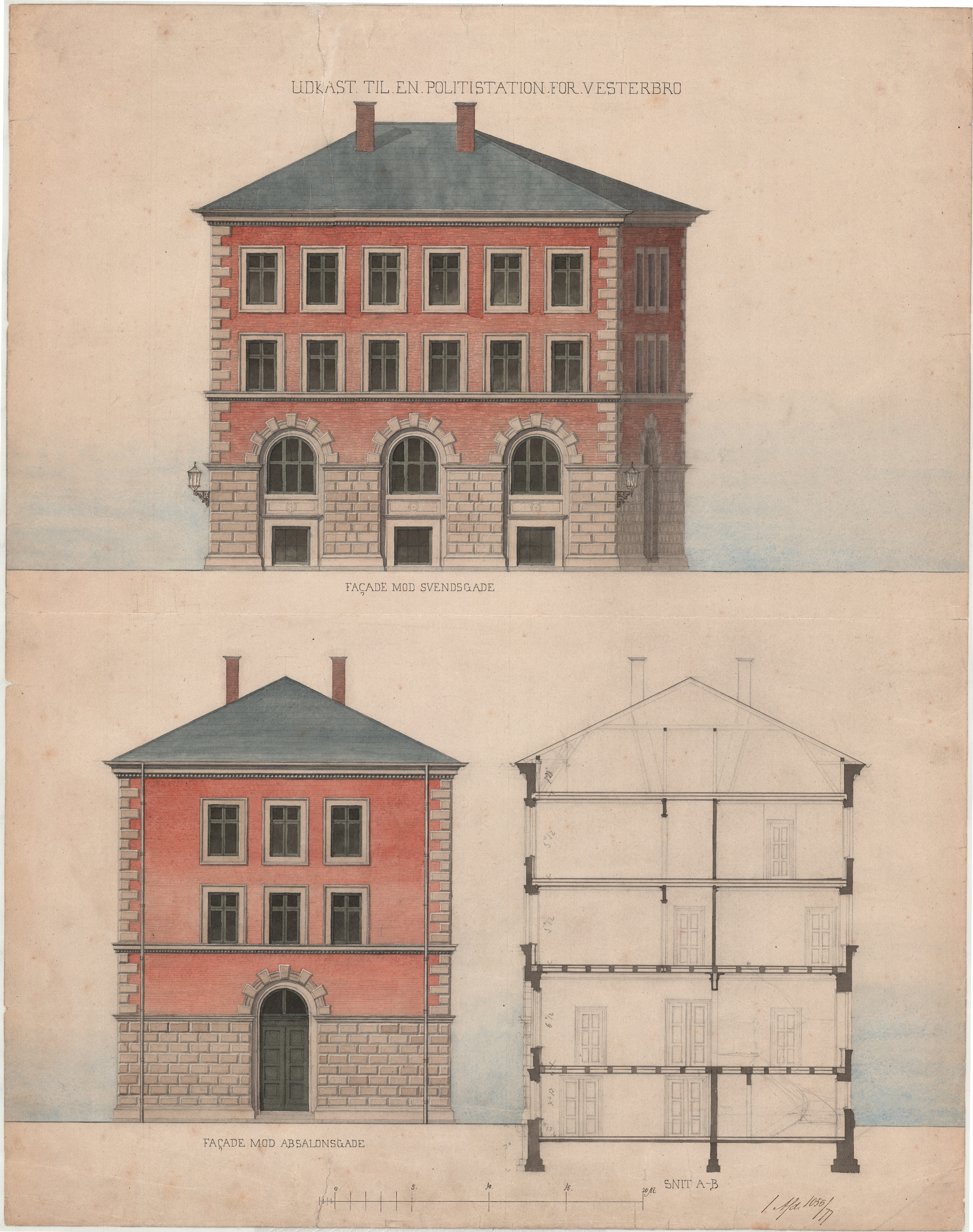
Rendering for Svendsgade Police Station )1881)3

The street was created on land that had previously belonged to the Royal Copenhagen Shooting Society's vast property outside the city's Western City Gate. The new street was named after Absalon, Copenhagen's legendary founder. It was built over with typical 5-storey apartment blocks from the 1870s

One of the developers was Peter Christian Wienberg, one of the most active builders of the time. He had started his career in the provinces, building everything from lighthouses to manor houses, but moved his business to Copenhagen in 1866. His professional relationship with Ferdinand Meldahl had secured him several large contracts, including the construction of the Danish National Gallery, Charlottenborg Exhibition Building and the completion of Frederick's Church.

The street was part of a densely populated working-class neighbourhood. In 1880, as an example of the living conditions, 17 families with a total of 81 children lived in the building fronting the street at No. 30.

Copenhagen Police Department's Station 5 moved to Svendsgade 3 at the corner of Absalonsgade in 1882. It had until then been located at nearby Gasværksvej.

== Notable buildings and residents ==
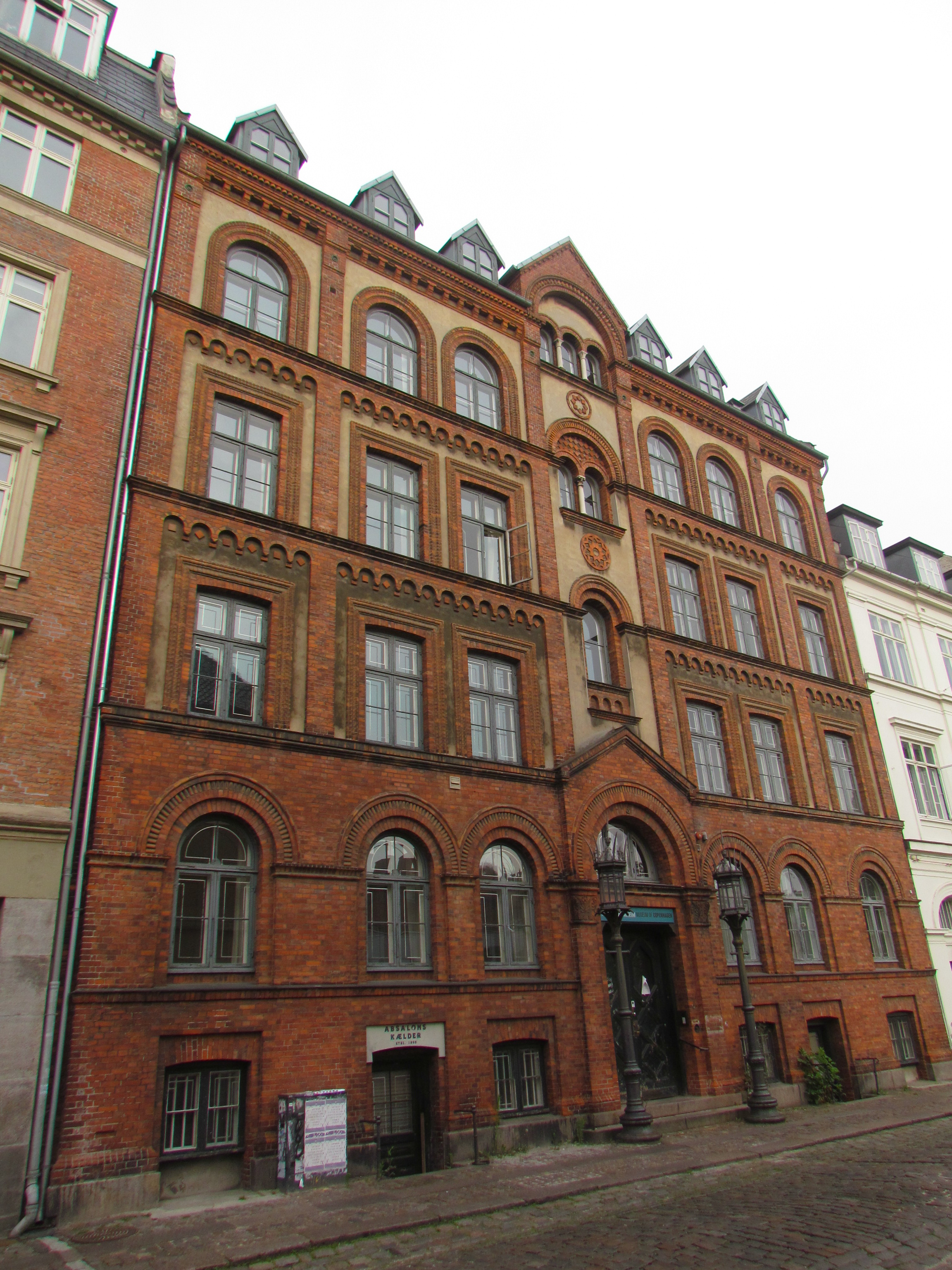
No. 3

The former Marie Kruse's School (No. 3) was built in 1880 to designs by Johannes Emil Gnudtzmann. Marie Kruse lived in an apartment in the attic. In 1886, Kruse moved the school into new premises on Frederiksberg Allé. The building in Absalonsgade was then taken over by Copenhagen Municipality and operated as a public primary school under the name Absalonsgade School until the First World Warl.

Vester Vov Vov cinema (No. 5) opened in 1975. It is based in the former Vesterbro Roman Baths. The Empire style building is from 1869 and was designed by Carl Lendorf. Vesterbro Roman Baths comprised a series of vaulted bathrooms with a Roman style firing system under the floor. Guests could get a Roman bath for 72 skilling, a hot water bath for 32 skilling or a shower for 16 skilling. Lendorf had together with distiller J. C. Olsen and Odense-based industrialist Ernst Traube, Odense purchased the site from the city.

The former Svendsgade Police Station

The former police station at the corner with Svendsgade (Svendsgade 3) has now been converted into apartments. The building is from 1882 and was designed by Ludvig Fenger. The windows in the ground floor were originally arched but has been adapted.

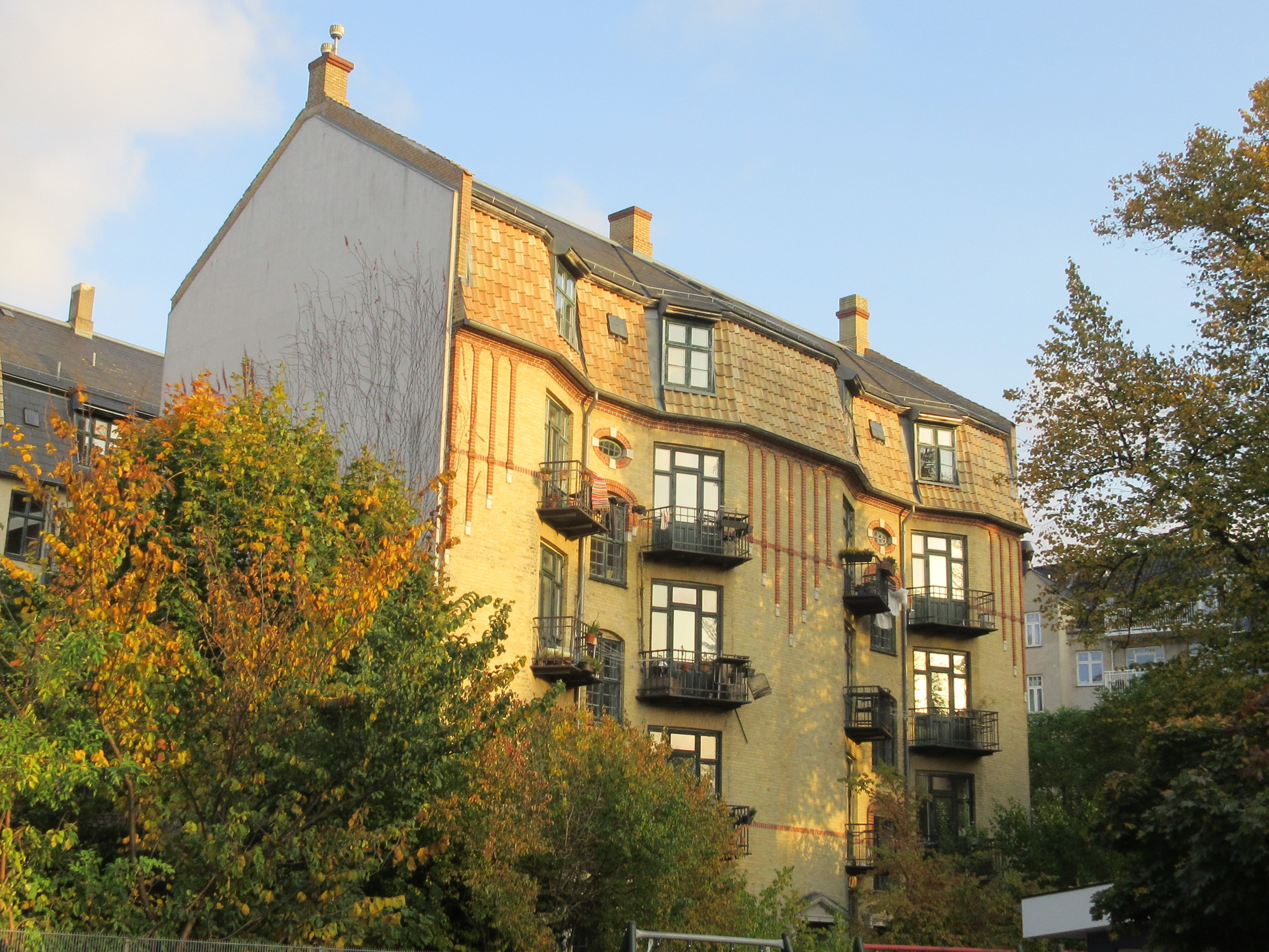
The former Svendsgade Police Station

No. 17 is from 1874 and was designed by Charles Abrahams. No. 22 is from 1869 and was designed by Vilhelm Friederichsen. No. 17 is from 1874 and was designed by Charles Abrahams. To the rear of No. 28, with views of the Shooting Range Garden, is a Jugendstil-influenced building from 1903 designed by Aage Langeland-Mathiesen.

Vesterbro Ungdomsgård (No. 10) is located just inside the gate to the Shooting Range Garden. It was built by city architect Hans Christian Hansen in 1952–53.

== Cultural references ==
The apartment where the eponymous protagonist lives with her family in the 1968 DR TV series Sonja is located at Absalonsgade 30.
