= Vilhelm Friederichsen =

Danish architect

Vilhelm Heinrich Friederichsen (6 May 1841 – 5 March 1913) was a Danish architect.

== Early life and education ==
Friederichsen was born in Copenhagen, the son of carpenter Peter Wilhelm Friederichsen (1817–74) and Helene Theresia Seerup (1821–75). He apprenticed as a carpenter and attended the Technical Institute in Læderstræde in the winter time for three years before enrolling at the Royal Danish Academy of Fine Arts in 1856 where he studied under Gustav Friedrich Hetsch and Christian Hansen. He won the small silver medal in 1864 and graduated in 1865.

== Career ==
Friederichsen and Peter Christian Bønecke won third prize in the competition for the new Royal Danish Theatre in 1871 and specialized in the design of hospitals. He designed the first phase of the Øresund Hospital in 1875-76 and the Blegdam Hospital in 1878–80. In 1883–85, he designed the Sankt Johannes Stiftelse complexes on both sides of Ruesgade for which he received the C. F. Hansen Medal in 1886. He also designed Præstø County's hospital in Stege in 1892 and extensions of Næstved Hospital in 1893–94. In the late 1880s and early 1890s, he was involved in the preparation of the relocation of Frederiks Hospital and Fødselsstiftelsen but his 1892 Rigshospitalet proposal was not selected.

Friederichsen was also the designer of a large number of public and private buildings in the new neighbourhoods that developed on the outskirts of Copenhagen towards the end of the century. He served as Building Inspector in Copenhagen's 1st District (Vesterbro) in 1875–89. He designed some of the first slaughterhouses in the first phase of the new Cattle Market in 1881–83.

== Personal life ==
He married Anna Kirstine Katharine Madsen (1842–1927)m a daughter of later fire department director Niels Madsen (1813–68) and Mariane Sarine Johansen (1817–tidligst 96), on 26 July 1867 in Frederiksberg.

== List of works ==
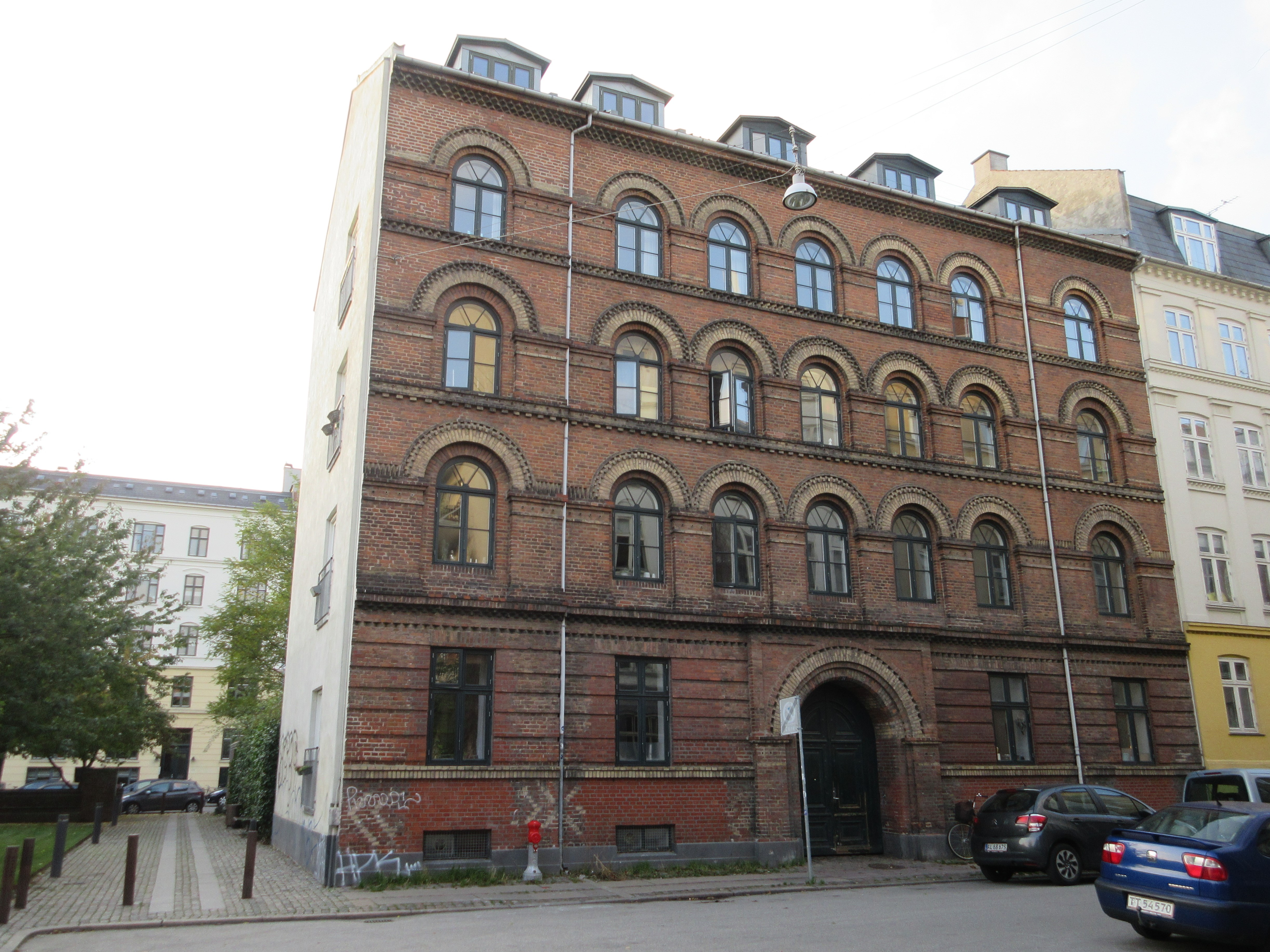
Dannebrogsgade 24

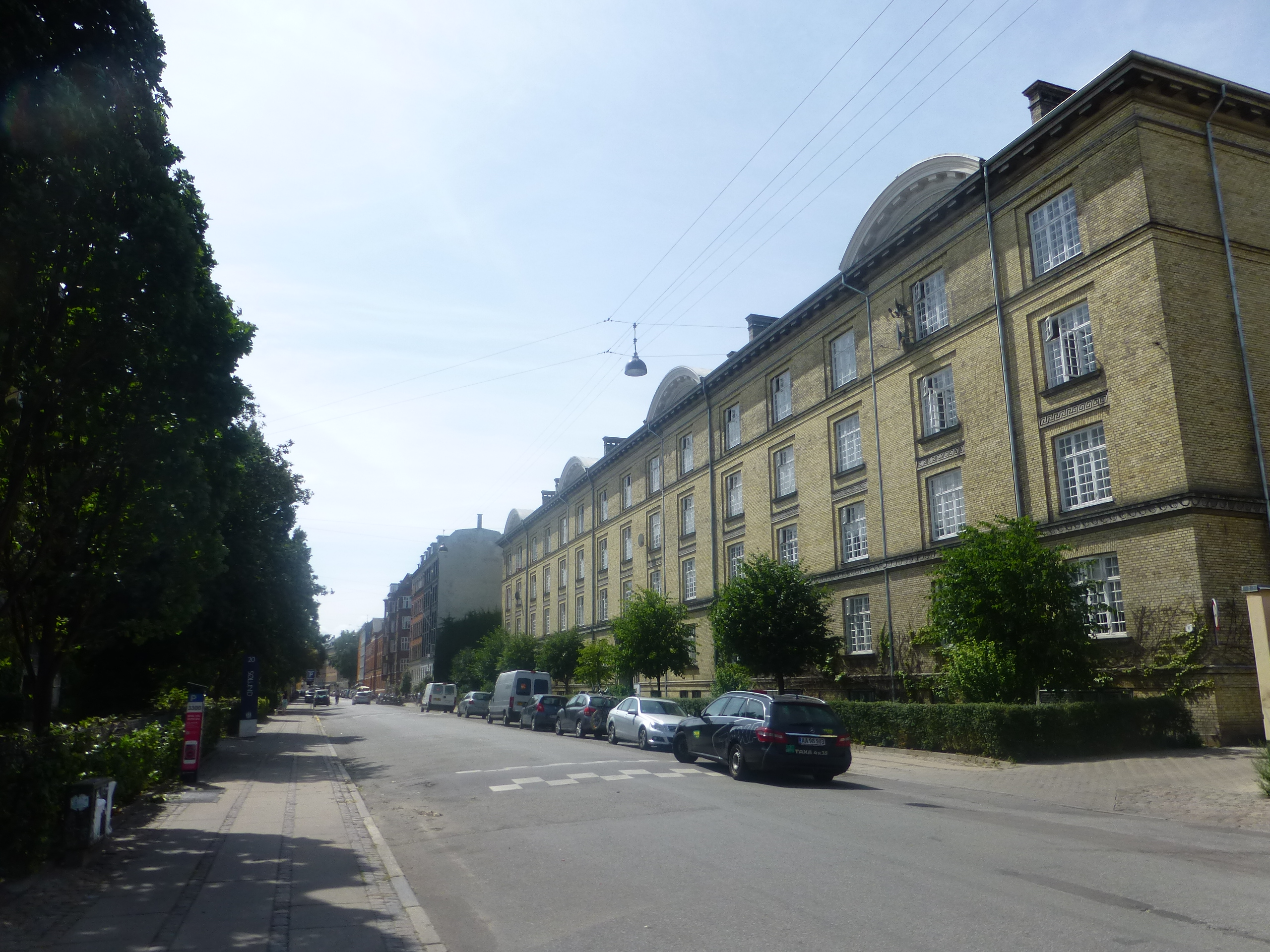
Sankt Johannes Stiftelse

- Dannebrogsgade 24, Copenhagen (1862)
- Vodroffsvej 5-9 (1868–69), Frederiksberg (1866)
- Viktoriagade 16, Copenhagen (1867)
- Vesterbrogade 55, Copenhagen (1868)
- Absalonsgade 22, Copenhagen (1869)
- Vesterbrogade 73 B/Saxogade 2, Copenhagen (1869)
- Frederiksberg Allé 2, Frederiksberg (1871)
- Hauchsvej 13, Frederiksberg (1871)
- Five buildings on Gammelholm, Copenhagen (1872, with Frederik Bøttger)
- Øresund Hospital, Carl Nielsens Allé, Copenhagen (1875–76)
- Blegdam Hospital, Blegdamsvej, Copenhagen (1876–79, demolished 1974)
- Sankt Johannes Stiftelse, Ryesgade and Sortedams Dossering (1883–85, C.F. Hansen Medal, South Wing demolished)
- 1st phase Cattle Market and Vestre Gasværk (1881, opened 1883)
- Trommesalen 1-3 (1883, No.1 demolished)
- Mynstersvej 3, Frederiksberg (1884)
- Vesterbrogade 66, Copenhagen (1884)
- Viktoriagade 14, Copenhagen (1885)
- Tullinsgade 23, Copenhagen (1890)
- Sporvejsselskabets remises, Århusgade 101 and Blegdamsvej 132, Copenhagen (1900–02, with engineer Johansen, altered in 1980'erne)
- Extension of remise, Bragesgade 5, Nørrebro (1900–02, bow Nørrebrohallen)
- Frederikssund Hospital, Frederikssund (1891)
- Vesterbrogade 39–41, Copenhagen (1891)
- Rosenkranskirken and School, Boyesgade 8, Copenhagen (1891–92, church closed 1942 and blown up on 27 March 1945 og)
- Præstø County Hospital, Peblingerende, Stege (1892)
- Mariahjemmet and St- Knud's Chapel (later closed), Vester Voldgade 115, Copenhagen (1902)
- Epidemihus, Præstø County Hospital, Ringstedgade, Næstved (1892 and 1904)
- Egestræde School, Store Heddinge (1896)
- Tårnborgvej 4 and 6-8 (1870), Copenhagen
- Buildings, Tivoli Gardens, Copenhagenj
