= Viktoriagade =

Street in Copenhagen, Denmark

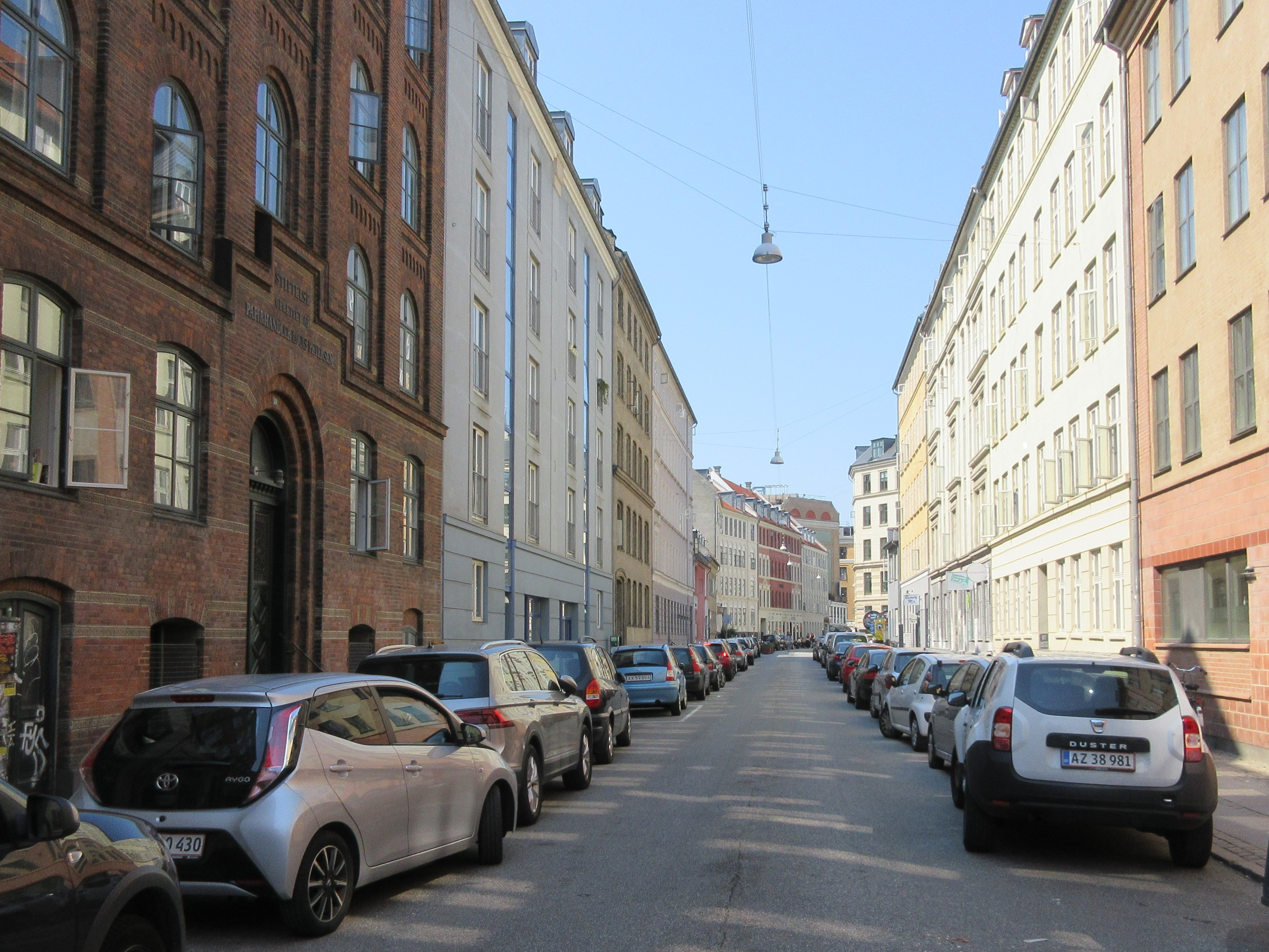
- Interactive map of Viktoriagade
- Length: 315 m (1,033 ft)
- Location: Copenhagen, Denmark
- Quarter: Vesterbro
- Nearest metro station: Copenhagen Central Station
- Coordinates: 55°40′16.36″N 12°33′30.37″E
- North end: Vesterbrogade
- Major junctions: Istedgade
- South end: Halmtorvet

Viktoriagade is a street in the Vesterbro district of Copenhagen, Denmark. It runs from Vesterbrogade in the northwest to Halmtorvet in the southeast and is intersected by Istedgade. The three buildings at No. 8-12 are listed on the Danish registry of protected buildings and places.

== History ==
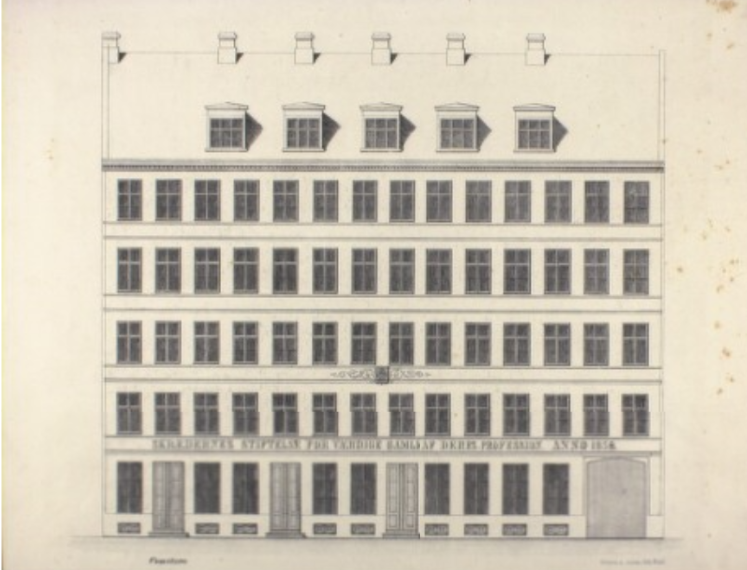
Rendering of Skrædernes Stiftelse at No.18, 1868

In the 1620s a fortification known as Retrenchementet was constructed at the site by Christian IV. In front of the rampart ran a moat known as Rosenåen.

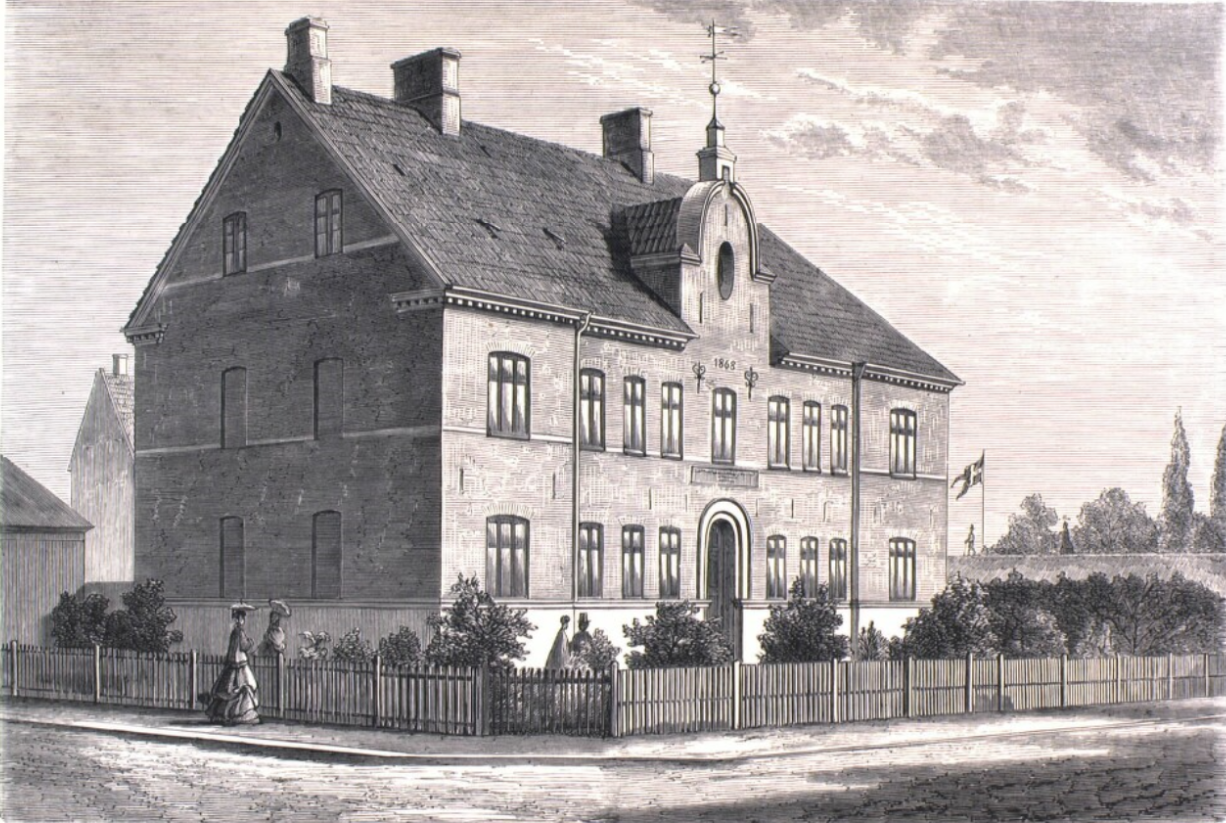
J. W. Heyman og Hustrues Stiftelse

The area came under redevelopment in the 1950s. Two large lots adjacent to the planned street Gasværksvej were sold to carpenter and developer Jensen. He sold them to the trading house Larsen og Co. in 1854. The company wanted an access road directly to Vesterbrogade and the city engineer's office wanted to get rid of Rosenåen which had developed into an open sewer. Viktoriagade was therefore established on top of the former moat. The land along the street was sold off in lots from 1856.

A number of the early buildings in the new street were built as charitable housing complexes. Skrædernes Stiftelse (No. 18) was built for old tailors in circa 1858. J. V. Heymans Stiftelse for officers' widows (No. 19) was founded in 1869 at the initiative of J. V. Heyman. The building had been completed in 1868 and contained five residents for widows as well as a residence for the inspector. The building was demolished in 1895.

== Notable buildings and residents ==
Viktoriagade No. 8 (1860), No. 10 (1862) and No. 12 are listed in the Danish registry of protected buildings and places.

Konferensråd J.H. Mundts Stiftelse (No. 20) is from 1863. No. 16 (1867) and No. 14 (1885) were designed by Vilhelm Friederichsen.

== Public art ==
At the pointed corner of Viktoriagade and Abel Cathrines Gade stands a large heart in black corten steel. It was designed by Fin Christiansen and installed in 2000.

== Gallery ==
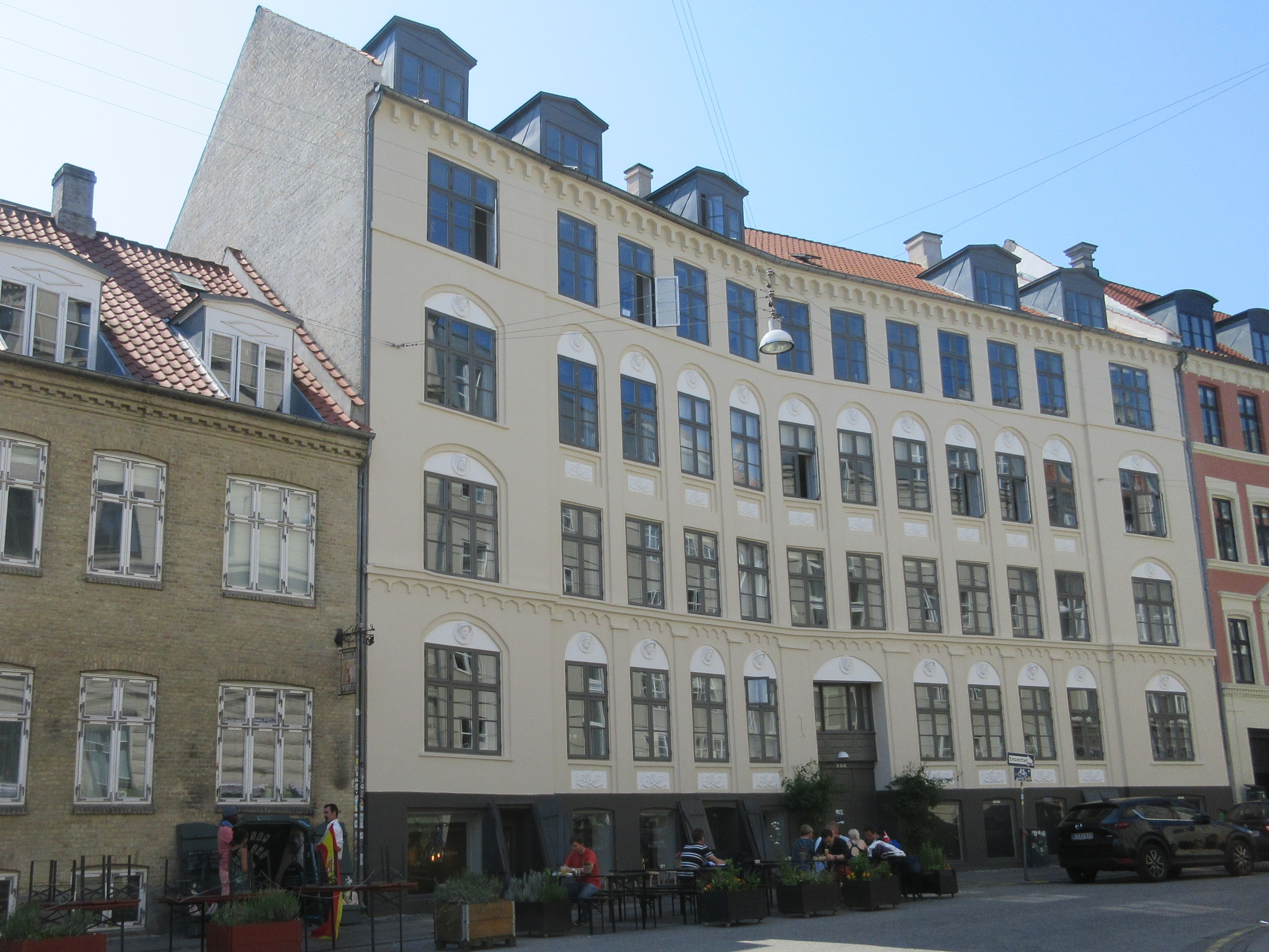
Viktoriagade 8

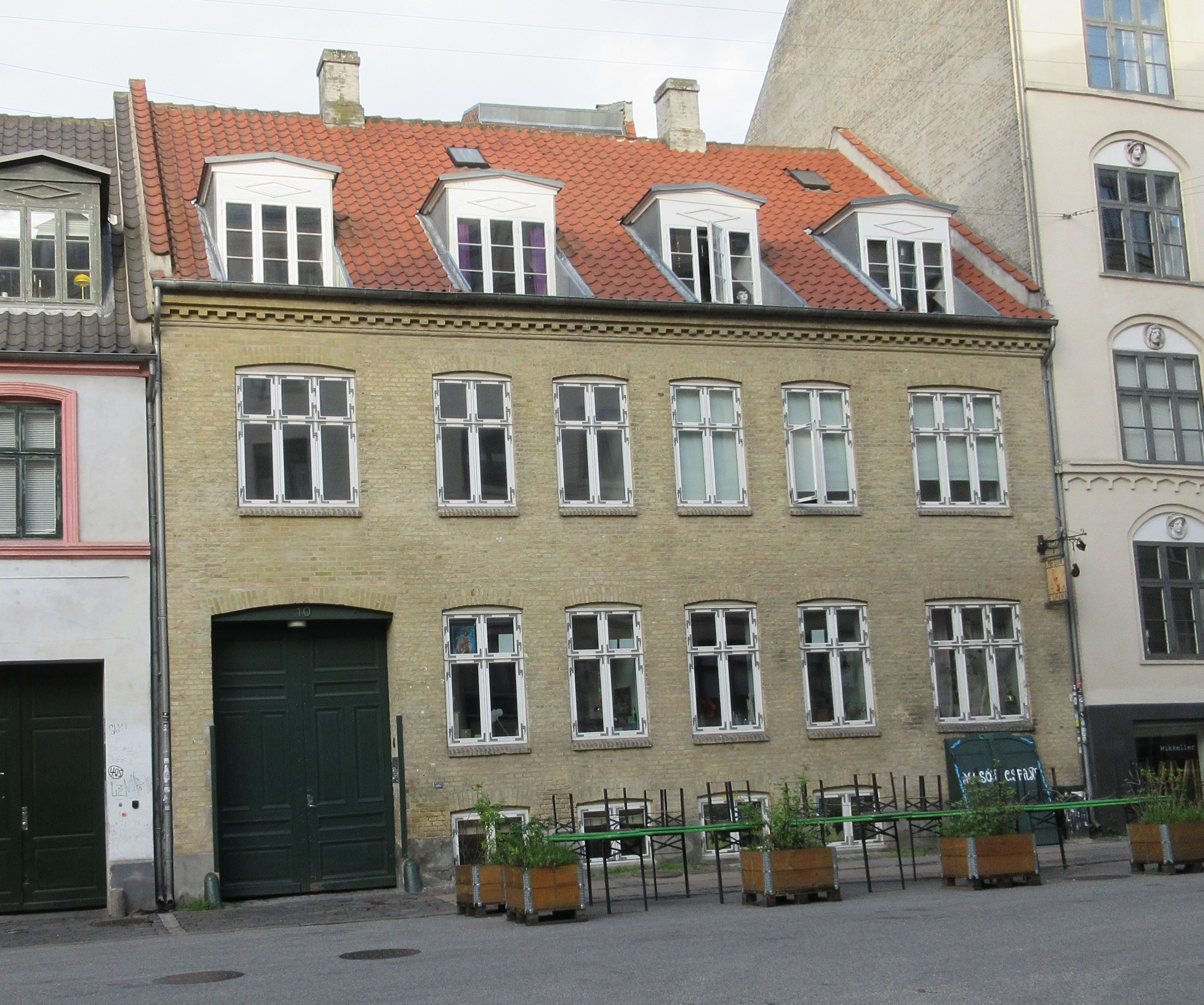
Viktoriagade 10

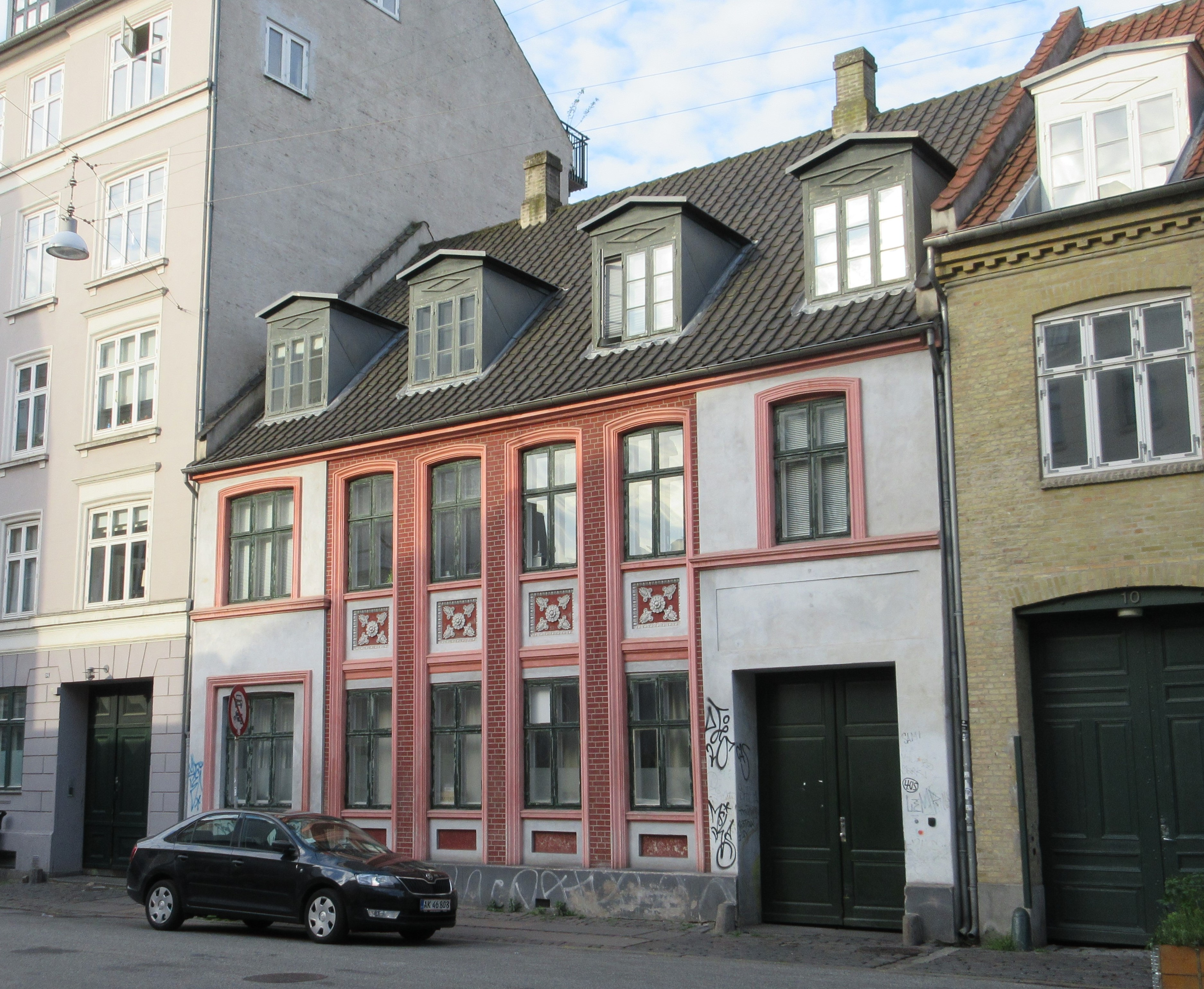
Viktoriagade 12

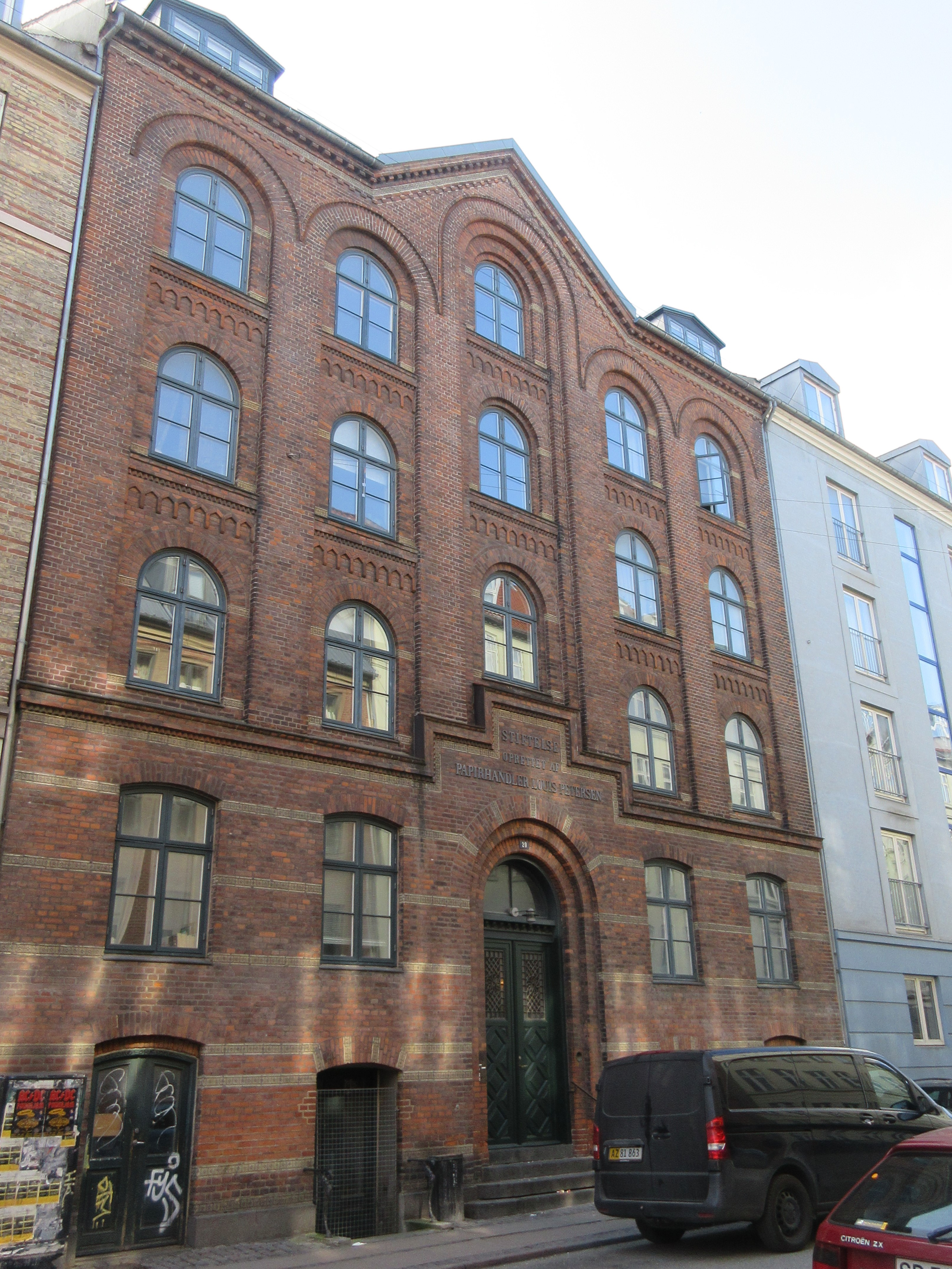
No. 20: Konferensråd J.H. Mundts Stiftelsejunction

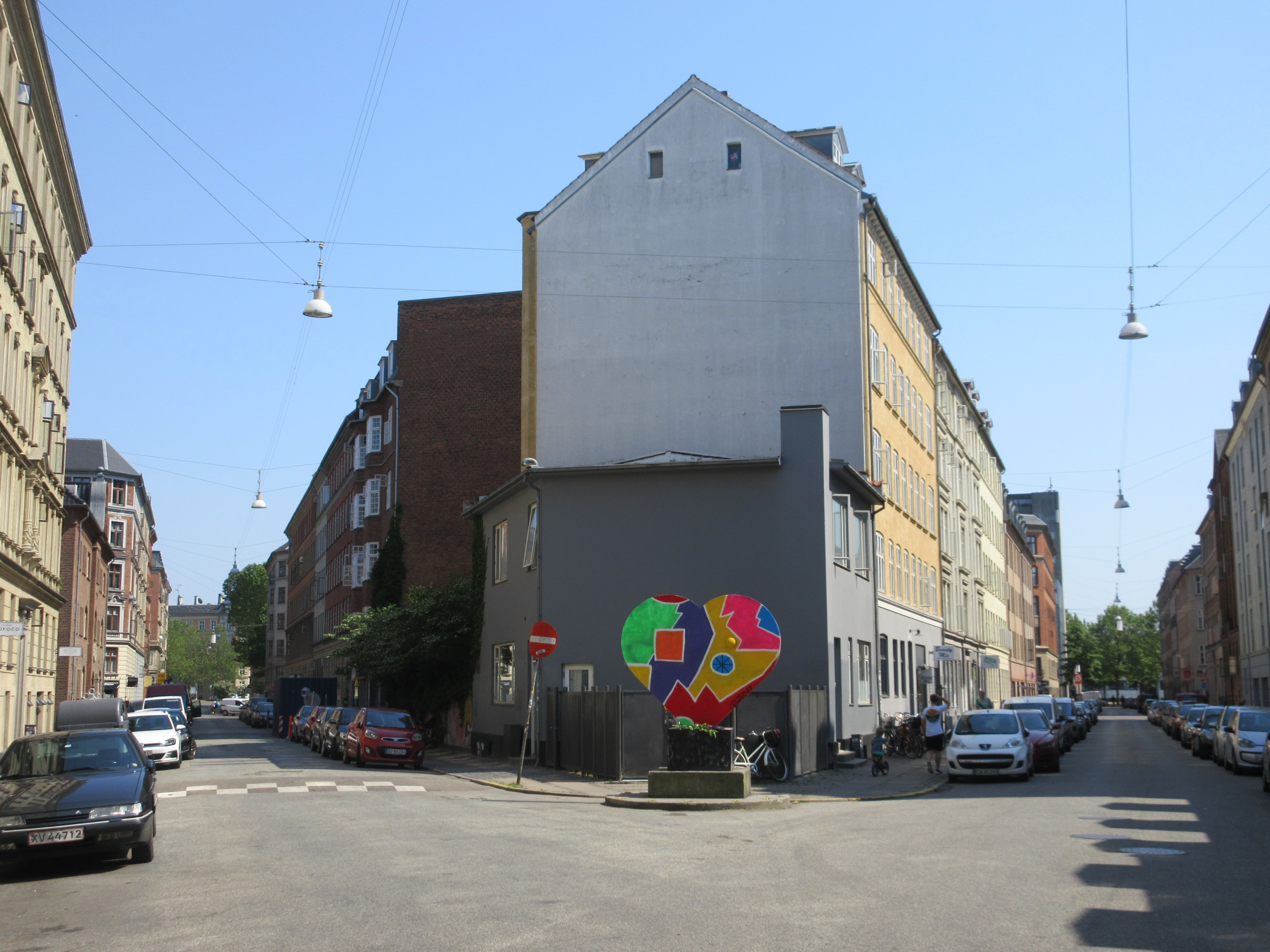
Viktoriagade-Abel Cathrines Gade

== See also ==
- Helgolandsgade
