= Congressional Friends of Denmark =

US congressional caucus

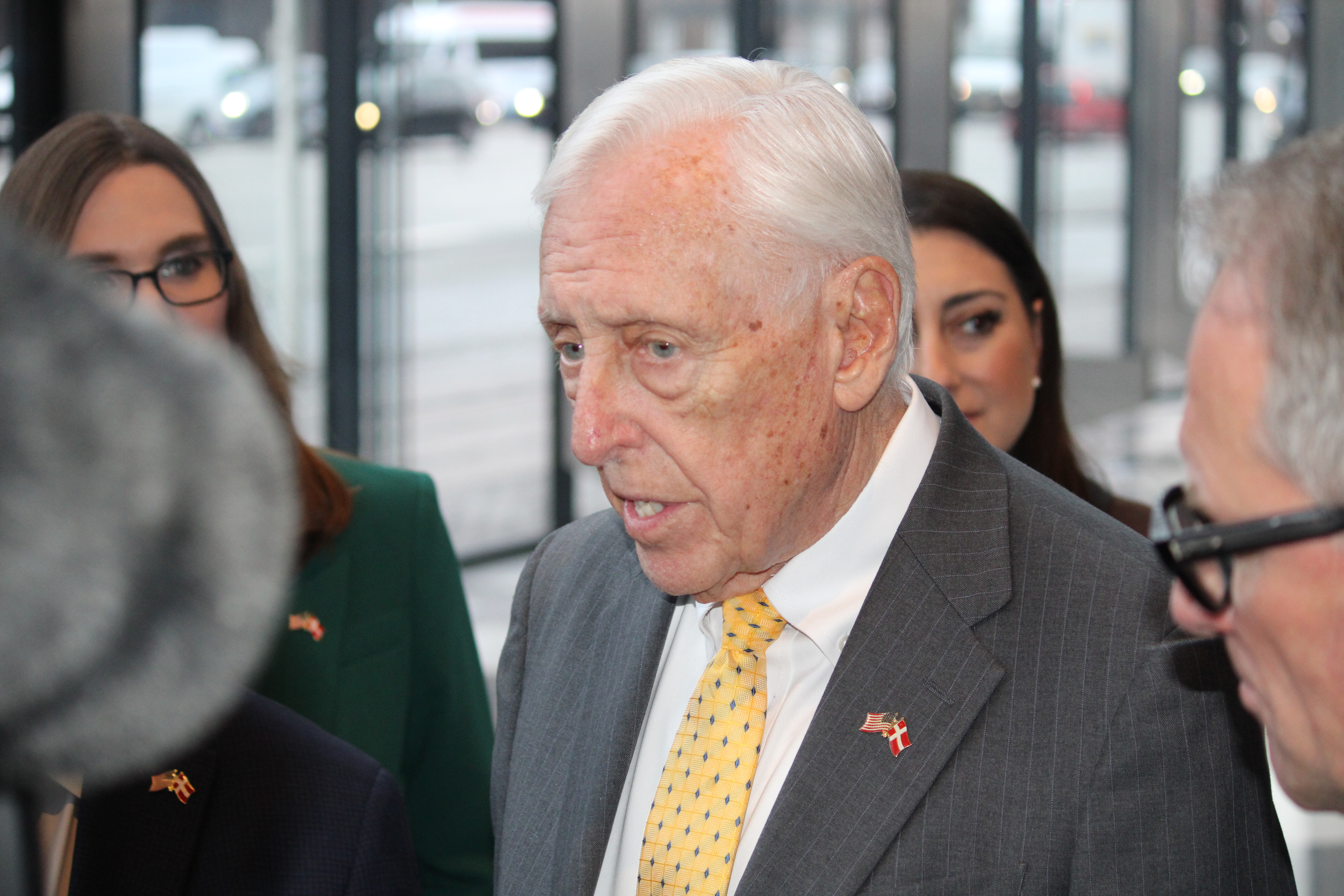
Steny Hoyer speaking at Industriens Hus in Copenhagen during a 2026 visit to Denmark

The Congressional Friends of Denmark Caucus is a caucus of the 118th United States Congress. Its chairs are the former Majority Leader Steny Hoyer (D-Maryland) and Tom Cole (R-Oklahoma).

Congressional Friends of Denmark Caucus have been a caucus at least since the 111th Congress.

== See also ==
- Denmark–United States relations
- Rufus Gifford
