= Dannebrogsgade =

Street in Copenhagen Municipality, Denmark

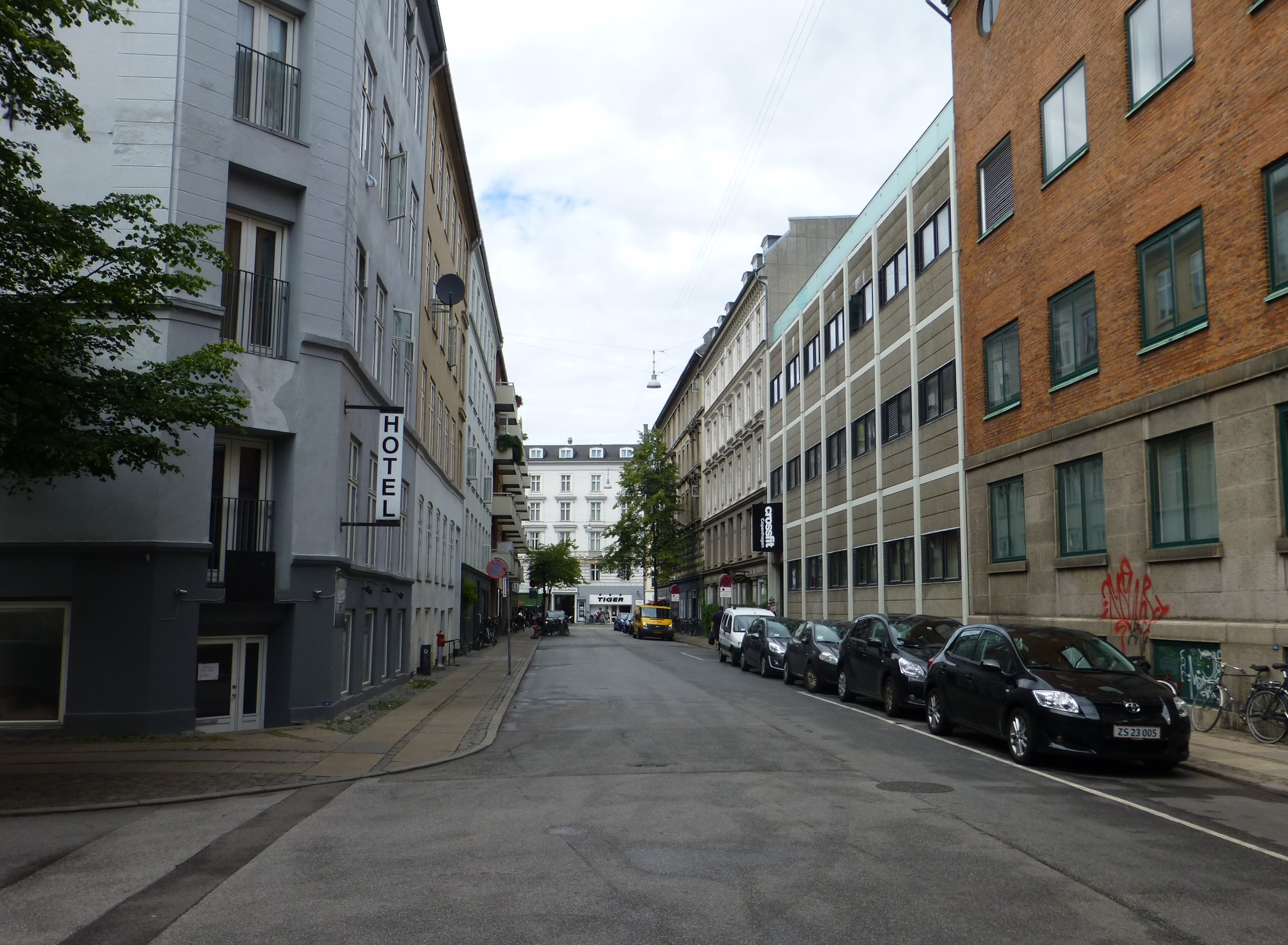
Dannebrogsgade

Dannebrogsgade (literally: "Dannebrog Street") is a street in the Vesterbro district of Copenhagen, Denmark. It runs from Vesterbrogade in the north to Sønder Boulevard in the south and passes Istedgade on the way. It is closed to car traffic both at Otto Krabbes Plads and Litauens Plads. The buildings on the east side of the street at its northern end overlooks the Shooting Range Garden.

== History ==
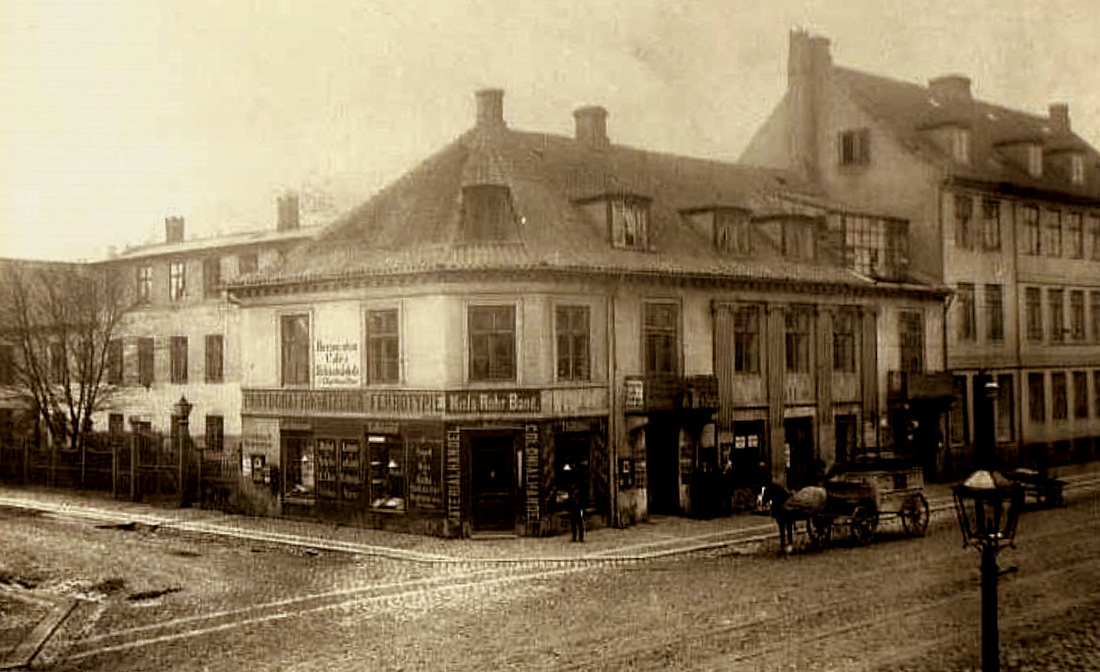
The corner of Dannebrogsgade and Vesterbrogade, 1885

Pastor Christianis Pigeinstitut, an educational institution where girls could receive equestrian training and practice physical exercise, was built at the site where Dannebrosgade now meets Vesterbrogade in 1795. It was operated by pastor C. J. Rudolph Christiani and Knud Lyne Rahbek from Bakkehuset was for a while a teacher at the institution.

The street was established in 1858. Its name was proposed by the Royal Copenhagen Shooting Society.

== Notable buildings and residents ==
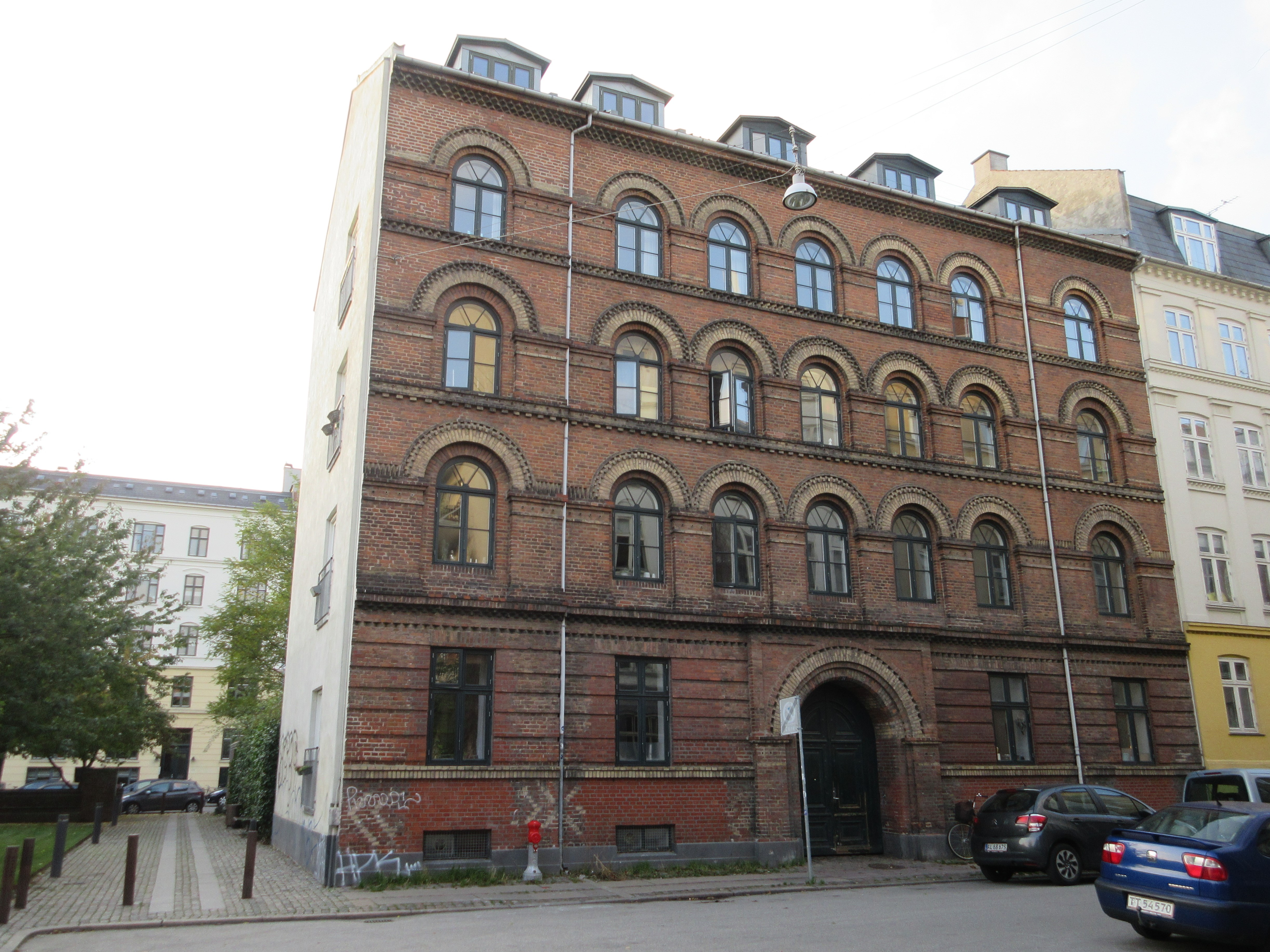
Dannebrogsgade 24

Gethsemane Church (No. 53) is a Church of Denmark parosj church. Ot was built in 1915–16 to design by Hans Wright who served as city architect of Copenhagen from 1907 to 1925.

Dannebrogsgade 24 is from 1862 and was designed by Vilhelm Friederichsen. No. 3 is from 1881 and was designed by Christian Laurits Thuren.

Since 2010, Dannebrogsgade 1 has headquartered A. Film Production, an animation studio.

== See also ==
- Westend, Copenhagen
