= Charles Abraham =

Charles Abraham may refer to:

- Charles Abraham (bishop of Wellington) (1814–1903), English Anglican bishop, in Wellington then Lichfield
- Charles Abraham (bishop of Derby) (1857–1945), English Anglican bishop, in Derby; son of the above

== See also ==
- Charles Abrahams (1838–1893), Danish architect
