= Vesterbro Pharmacy =

Building in Copenhagen

- Vesterbro Apotek
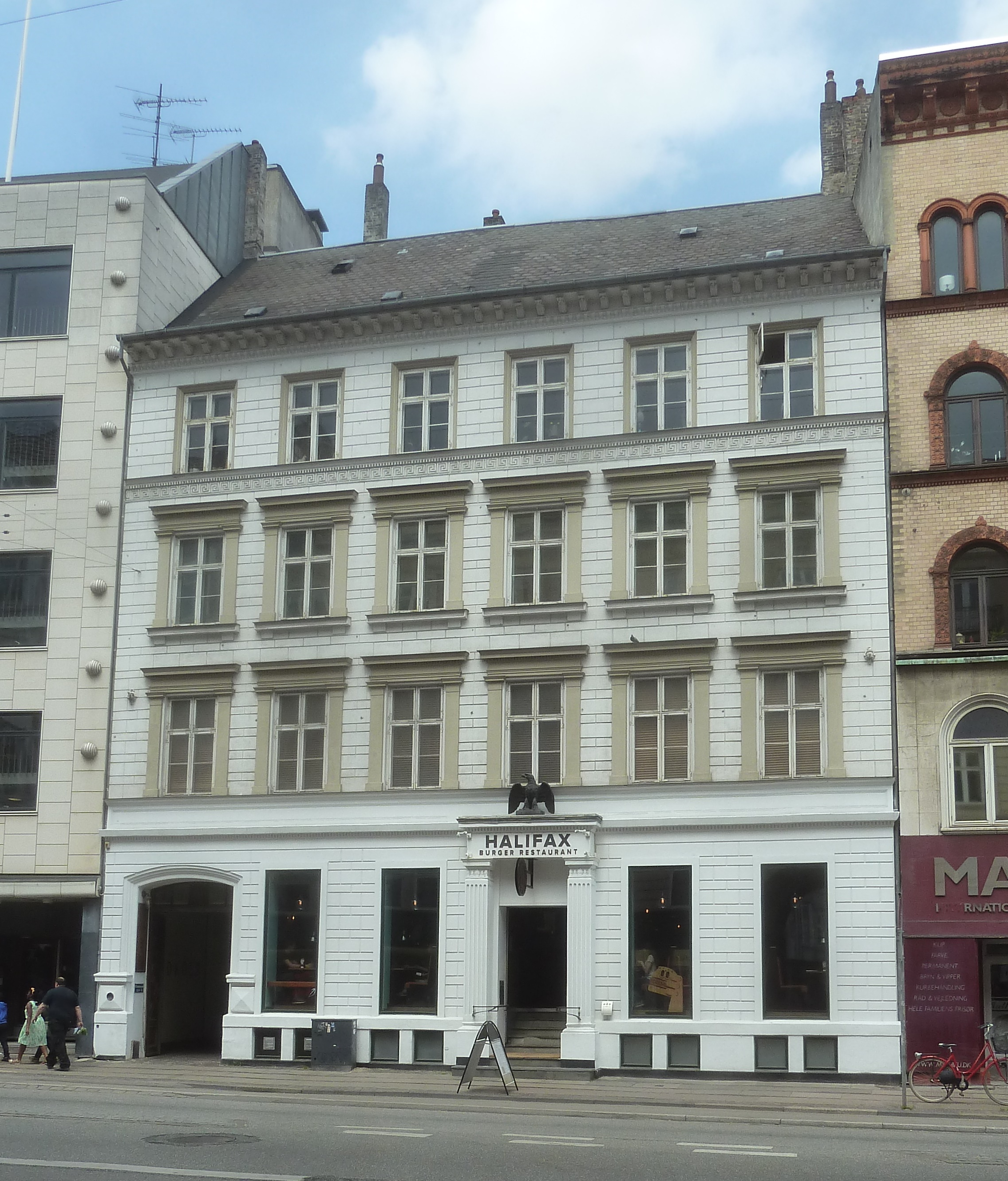
- Vesterbro Pharmacy
- Interactive map of the Vesterbro Pharmacy area

General information
- Architectural style: Neoclassical
- Location: Copenhagen, Denmark
- Coordinates: 55°40′41.66″N 12°33′35.84″E
- Completed: 1854 and 1883

Design and construction
- Architect: Jørgen Henrich Rawert

Vesterbro Pharmacy (Danish: Vesterbro Apotek) operated from 1795 to 1992 in the Vesterbro district of Copenhagen, Denmark. Its former buildings on Vesterbrogade, one facing the street and two in the courtyard on the rear, were listed in 1972; all three date from the second half of the 19th century.

Two other, still active pharmacies are found in the Vesterbro area. One of them, Steno Apotek, is located on the same street Vesterbrogade 6C, across the street from Copenhagen Central Station. The other, Enghave Apotek, is located at the corner of Enghavevej and Enghave Plads.

== History ==
=== The first building ===
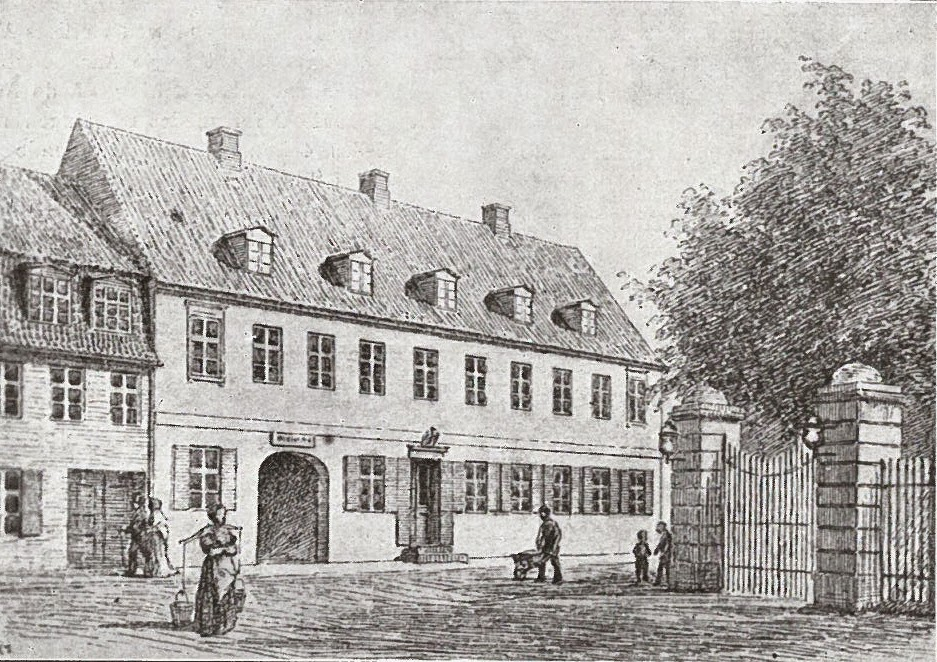
Vesterbro Apotek in 1802

The pharmacy was founded on 16 January 1795 by the chemist Johan Gottlieb Blau. It was then located on the other side of Vesterbrogade, approximately where Oehnschlægergade runs today. Blau would later also opene Gammeltorv Pharmacy, next to the city hall, on the corner of Nytorv and Frederiksborggade.

In 10 November 1797, Vesterbro Pharmacy was taken over by Wolfgang Andreas Resch. On 16 November 1802, it changed hands again when it was taken over by Jacob Møller.

=== The second building ===
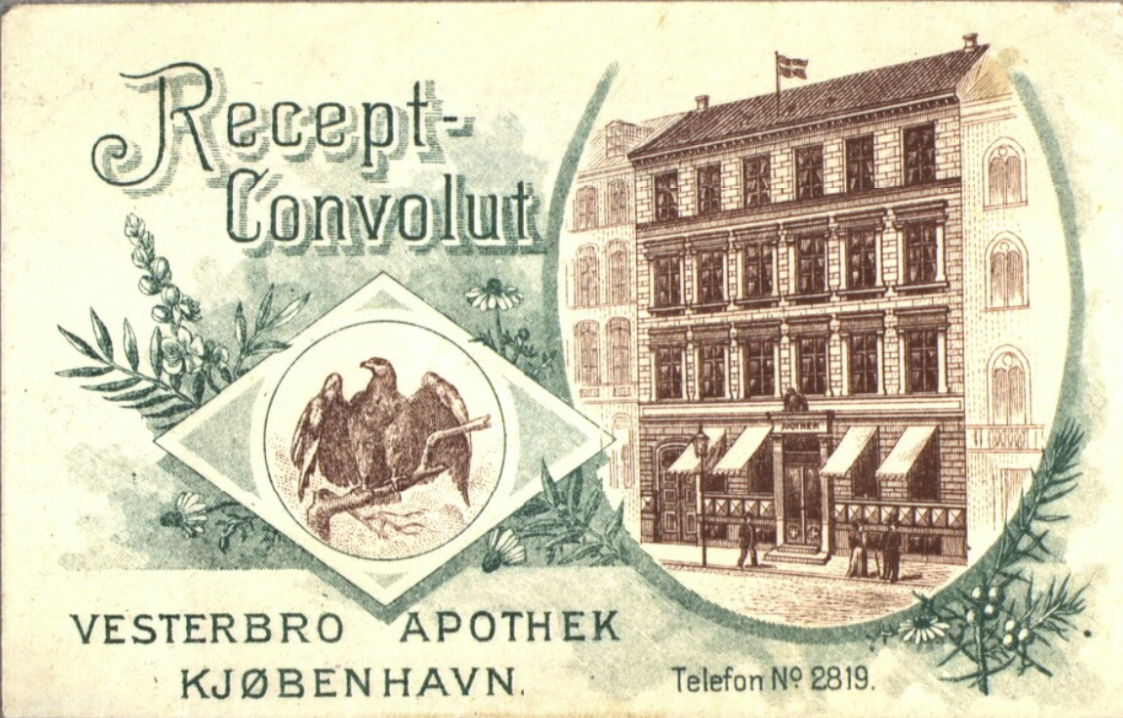
Prescription envelope from c. 1900

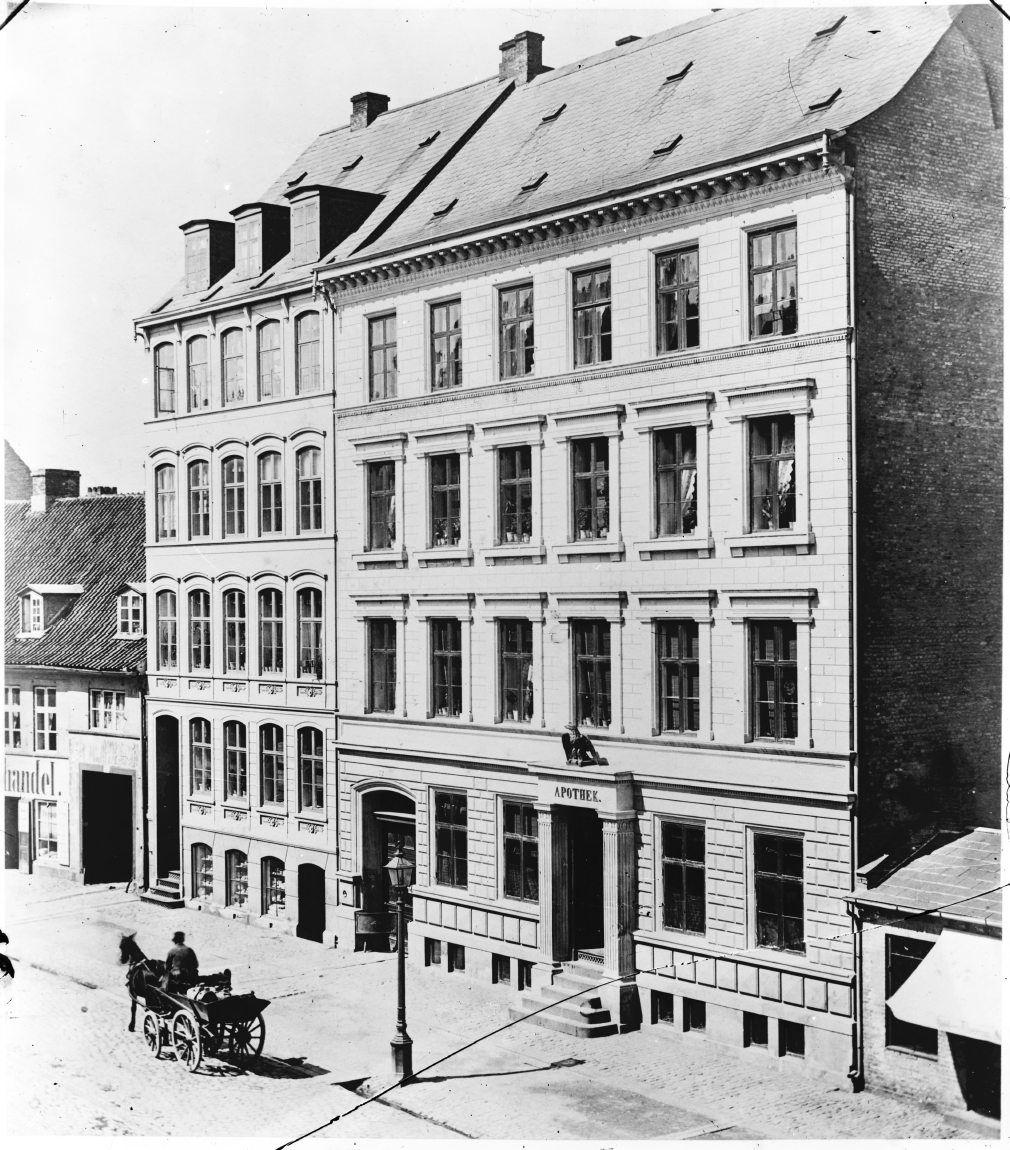
The new building photographed by Frederik Riise

The pharmacy moved to its current site in 1826. A new building was constructed there in 1854 to design by Peter Heinrich Christoph Hagemann. It was later expanded with a laboratory building to the rear by Peter Christian Bønecke in 1884. The pharmacy was for a while known as Ørne Apotek (lit. 'Eagles Pharmacy').

The building was listed in 1971. The pharmacy closed on 29 February 1992.

== Current use ==
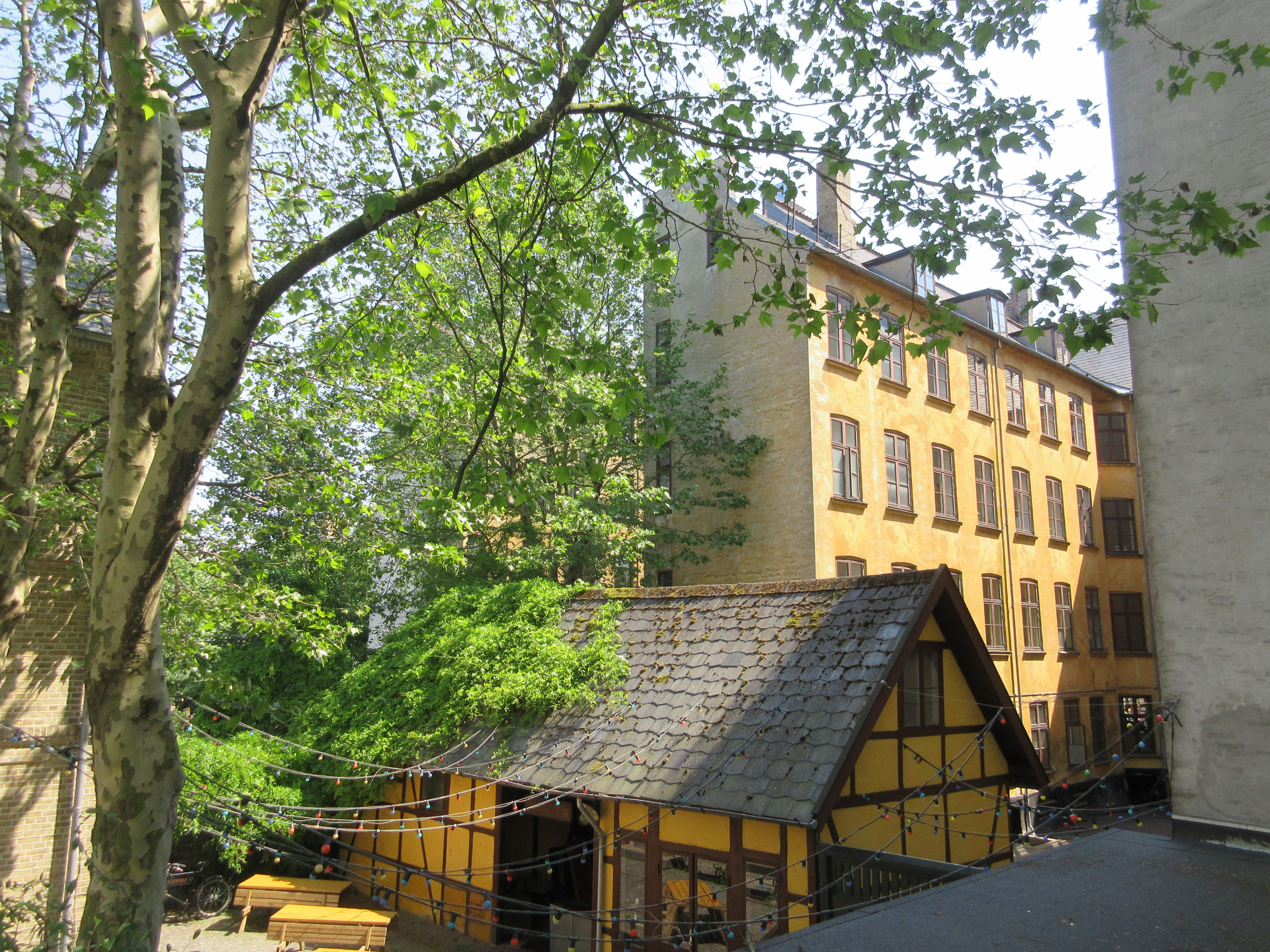
The rear side of the building

The owners of the high-profile cocktail bar Ruby on Gammel Strand opened the cocktail bar Lidkoeb in the former laboratory in the courtyard building (Vesterbrogade 72B) in November 2012.

The ground floor of the building facing the street was converted into a Halifax burger restaurant in 2014–15. The transformation was undertaken by Over Byen Arkitekter.

== List of chemists ==
The chemists were:

- 16.01.1795 - xx.xx.1796 Johan Gottlieb Blau
- 10.11.1797 - xx.xx.1802 Wolfgang Andreas Resch
- 16.11.1802 - 31.10.1805 Jacob Møller
- 10.01.1806 - 30.09.1810 Jens Iskow Thaning
- 04.12.1810 - 14.03.1829 Niels Møller
- 14.03.1829 - 30.04.1832 Martha Cathrine f. Sorterup En
- 10.07.1832 - 31.12.1863 Anders Madsen
- 19.03.1864 - 17.06.1919 Hans Peter Madsen
- 05.12.1912 - 09.02.1921 Erik Høst-Madsen (as co-owner)
- 09.02.1921 - 30.09.1948 Erik Høst Madsen (as solo owner)
- 15.09.1948 - 31.10.1965 Carl Richard Neergaard Jacobsen
- 09.10.1965 Ole Frederik Carl Olsen(Bevilling ikke benyttet)
- 01.11.1965 - 30.06.1966 Drevet af Apotekerfonden
- 25.04.1966 - 28.02.1992 Sven-Erik Sandermann Olsen

== See also ==
- Listed buildings in Copenhagen Municipality
