= Marie Kruse =

Danish schoolteacher

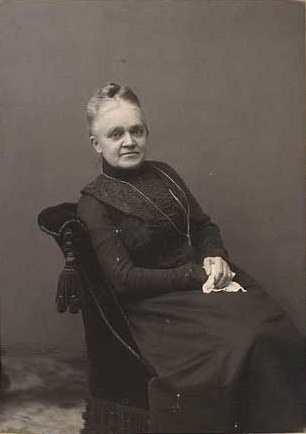
Marie Kruse

Marie Caroline Ernestine Clementine Kruse (1842–1923) was a pioneering Danish schoolteacher and principal, specializing in the education of girls. She also helped to establish and support several educational organisations for women.

== Early life and education ==
Born on 19 February 1842 in Flensburg, Kruse was the daughter of Johan Hinrich Jes Kruse (1805–59) and his wife Anna Magdalene Christine Becker (1815–59). Her father had helped to establish the first Danish-language school in Flensburg. It was here that Kruse and her siblings were educated in both Danish and German. After her confirmation, she went on to learn French, English and Italian, receiving private tuition from the schoolteacher and politician Christian Flor (1792–1875). After her father's death in 1859, together with several friends, he paid for training up to the level of head teacher at N. Zahle's School in Copenhagen from 1860 to 1862.

== Career ==
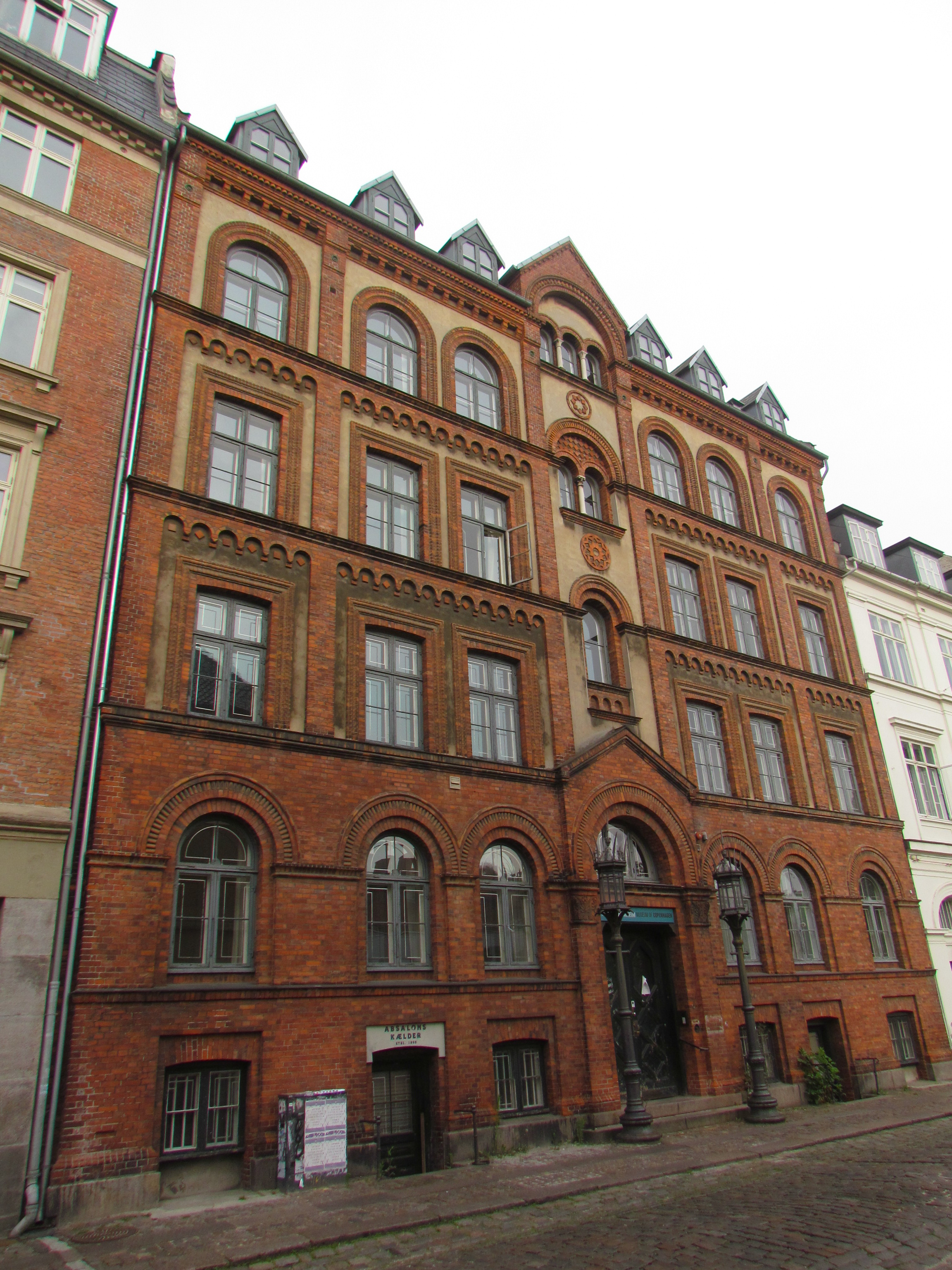
The formerMarie Kruse's School at Absalonsgade 3 in Copenhagen

On receiving her qualification, Kruse joined Louise Thomsen at the school she ran for the sons and daughters of Danish officers who had served or lived in Schleswig and Holstein. After Thomsen died in 1869, she ran the school herself. In 1879, she moved the school into new premises on Absalonsgade in Copenhagen, where it became Marie Kruse's School with 146 pupils. In 1886, she moved it once more, this time to Frederiksberg Alle. When Kruse retired in 1902, there were 336 pupils. It was recognized as one of the country's best schools for girls.

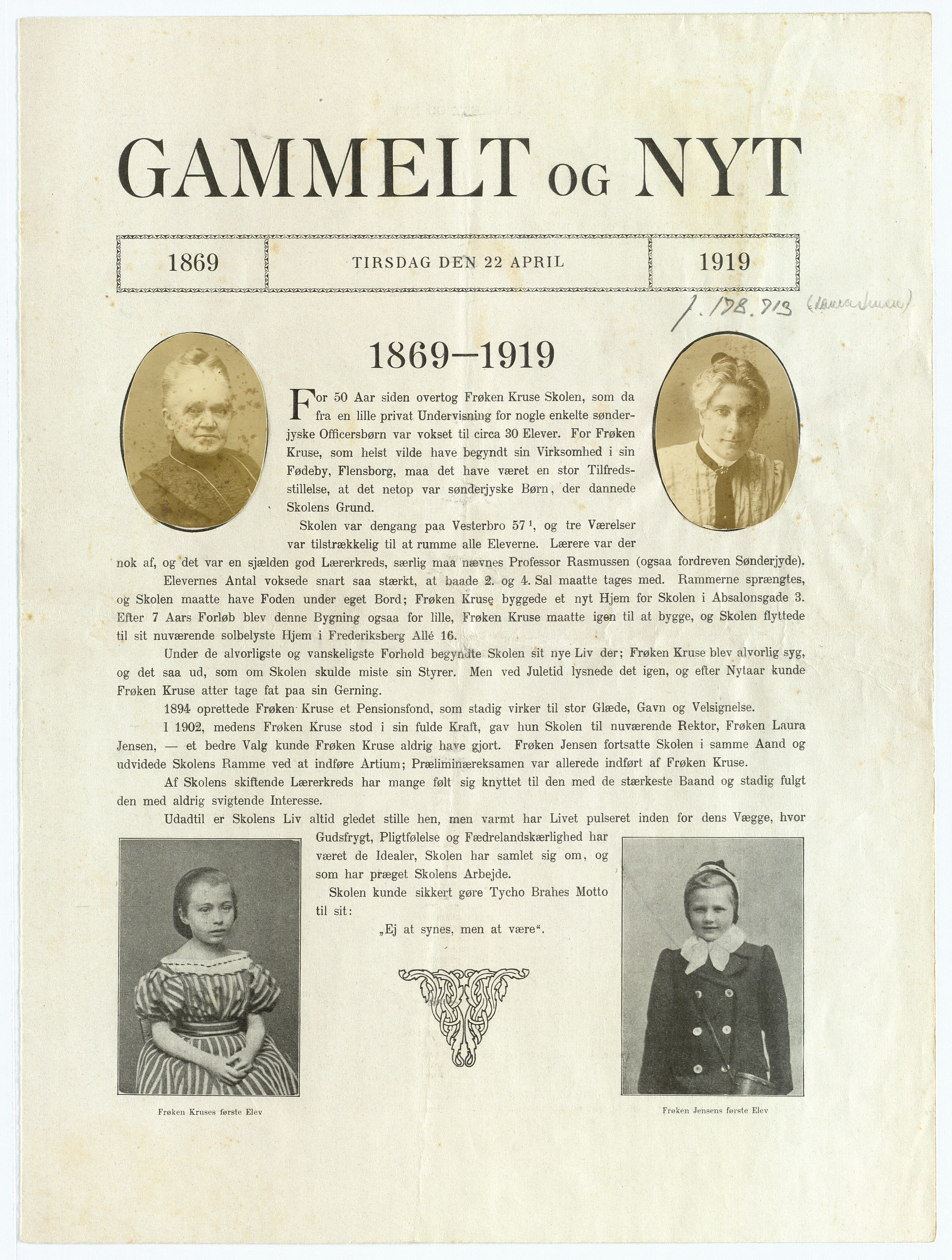
Kruse in Gammelt og Nyt.

As a schoolteacher, Kruse was strongly influenced by Natalie Zahle who became a lifelong friend. Both aimed at giving girls an education which would allow them to be self-supporting. Increasingly, she received the support of affluent parents who believed their daughters should move with the times and be able to stand on their own two feet. Always keen to support the history of southern Jutland in her curriculum, in 1884 Kruse was a co-founder of the Sønderjysk Samfund (South Jutland Society), becoming a member of the board in 1898. With a view to providing pensions for retired teachers, she founded Foreningen til Lærerinders Understøttelse (Association in Support of Women Schoolteachers), and in 1872 was a co-founder of Kvindelig Læseforening (Women's Reading Association). She was also an active member of Dansk Kvindesamfund (Danish Women's Society) and Den danske Pigeskole (Danish Girls' School).

Kruse retired in 1902 when she was only 60, apparently because she had difficulty in accepting the educational reforms of the times. Laura Jensen, a former pupil who became the school's principal, appreciated the discipline she had acquired under Kruse: "She was strict but many of us developed a strong liking for her discipline as with time we learnt that it was in our best interest."

In 1894, Kruse was awarded the Danish Medal of Merit. She died on 12 February 1923 in Frederiksberg.

== Legacy ==
Marie Kruses Skole is today located in Farum north of Copenhagen.
