= Confederation of Danish Industry =

Danish business and employers' organization

- Dansk Industri
- Formation: 1992
- Legal status: Political organization
- Purpose: Employers' organization
- Location: Copenhagen, Denmark
- President: Lars-Peter Søbye
- Chief Executing Officer: Lars Sandahl Sørensen
- Affiliations: BUSINESSEUROPE
- Website: www.danskindustri.dk/english/

The Confederation of Danish Industry (DI) is Denmark's largest business organization (chambers of commerce) and employers' organization. DI's members are 18,000 private enterprises in manufacturing and the service industry, from virtually all sub-sectors. Also, a number of sectoral employers' associations and branch federations are included in DI's framework, being integrated in part or in full in DI. Moreover, the members of DI in each county constitute a regional federation dealing with regional policy as well as educational issues. The organization represents its members in public discussions of new political ideas, and it comments on current events in Denmark. The DI director general and CEO is Lars Sandahl Sørensen.

== History ==
The first employer association in Denmark was established in 1885 by companies within the iron industry in Copenhagen as Foreningen af Fabrikanter i Jernindustrien i København. A national organisation with the name Sammenslutningen af Arbejdsgivere inden for Jernindustrien i Danmark was established in 1902. In the 1980s, it changed its name to Jernets Arbejdsgiverforening. Other companies within the manufacturing industry were organized in Arbejdsgiverforeningen Industrifagene. These two employer associations merged on 1 January 1990 under the name Industriens Arbejdsgivere.

In 1992 Industriens Arbejdsgivere merged with Industrirådet under the name Dansk Industri. On 1 May 2008, Dansk Industri merged with HTS Handel, Transport og Service under the name DI.

== Governance ==
The confederation is financed and owned by its members and governed by a council and executive committee elected by the annual general assembly. DI's management oversees the daily activities of 600 employees.

COWI A/S-CEO Lars-Peter Søbye succeeded Lars Mikkelgaard-Jensen as president of the executive committee in September 2017.

== Activities ==
The confederation's activities can be categorised as follows:
• Policy advocacy - at local, national, and international level.
• Membership services - information, advisory services, and consulting.
• Network relations - between members and with society at large.

== See also ==
- Industriens Hus
