= Industriens Hus =

Coordinates: 55°40′31″N 12°34′4″E

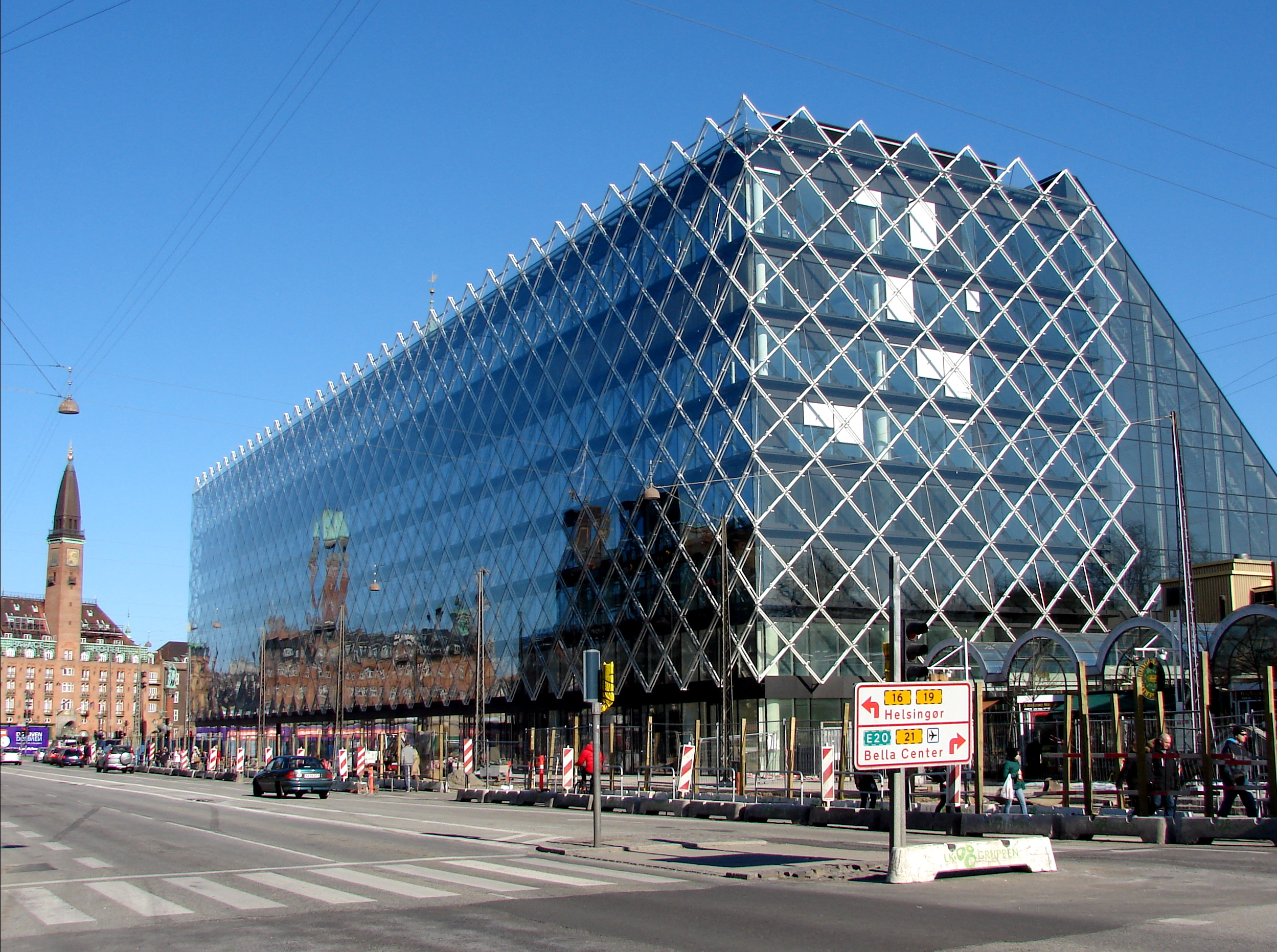
Industriens Hus

Industriens Hus is the home of the Confederation of Danish Industries (DI – Danish Industri). The building is located at the corner of H. C. Andersens Boulevard and Vesterbrogade, opposite the City Hall Square, in Copenhagen, Denmark. It also contains a showroom for green technologies, House of Green, as well as a series of two-storey flagship stores and restaurants on Vesterbrogade.

== History ==
=== The 1872 exhibition building ===
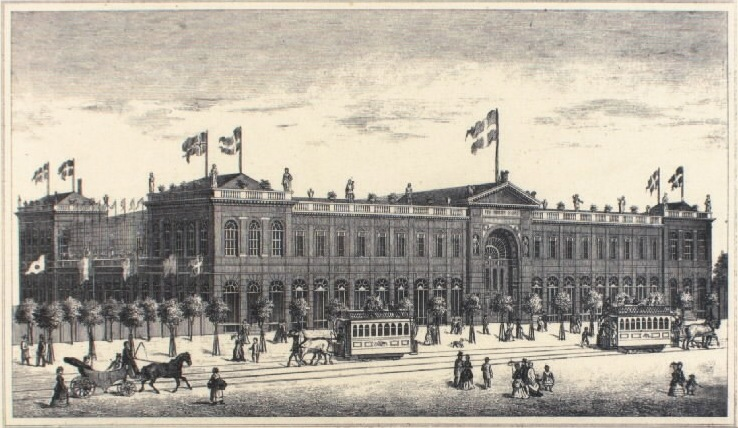
The Industry Building

Industriens Hus traces its history back to 1872 when the Association of Industrial Enterprises in Copenhagen (Industriforeningen I København) inaugurated their new Industry Building (Industribygningen), the principal exhibition venue of their first Nordic Exhibition. The building was designed by Vilhelm Klein. In 1878, the Association for Industrial Enterprises acquired the site and converted the building into their new headquarters.

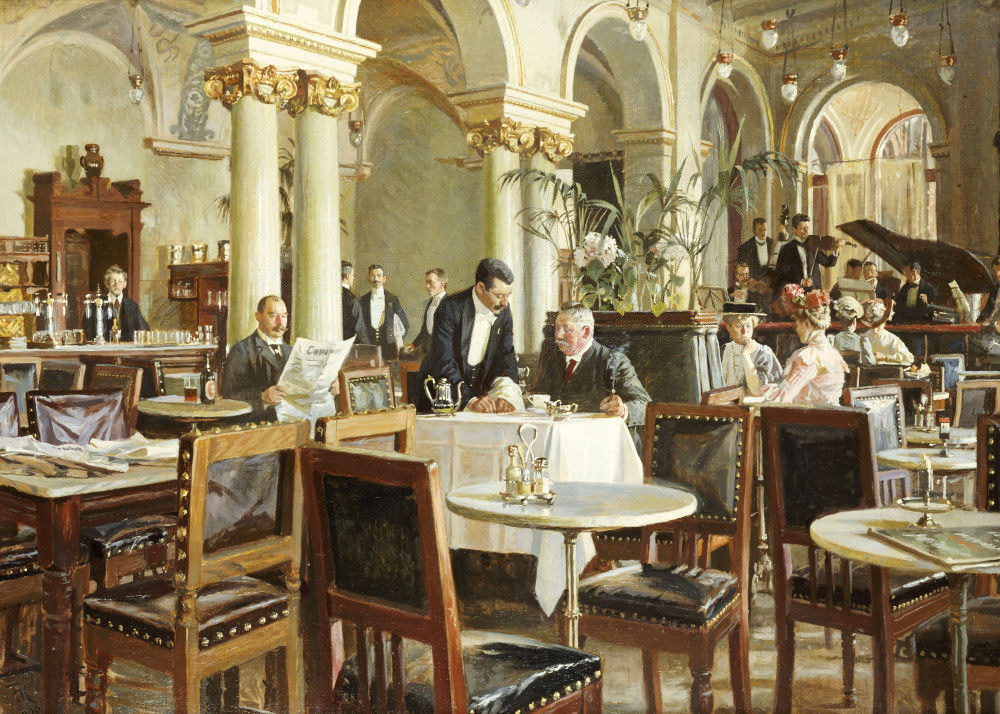
Industricaféen painted by Frants Henningsen

A glazed extension on Vester Boulevard was constructed in 1898. It was designed by Ludvig Clausen and was the result of an architectural competition. It contained a restaurant, Industri-Cafeen. It closed in 1933 and its premises were converted into a Ford showroom. The Palladium Cinema opened in another part of the building in 1838.

=== The 1970s building ===
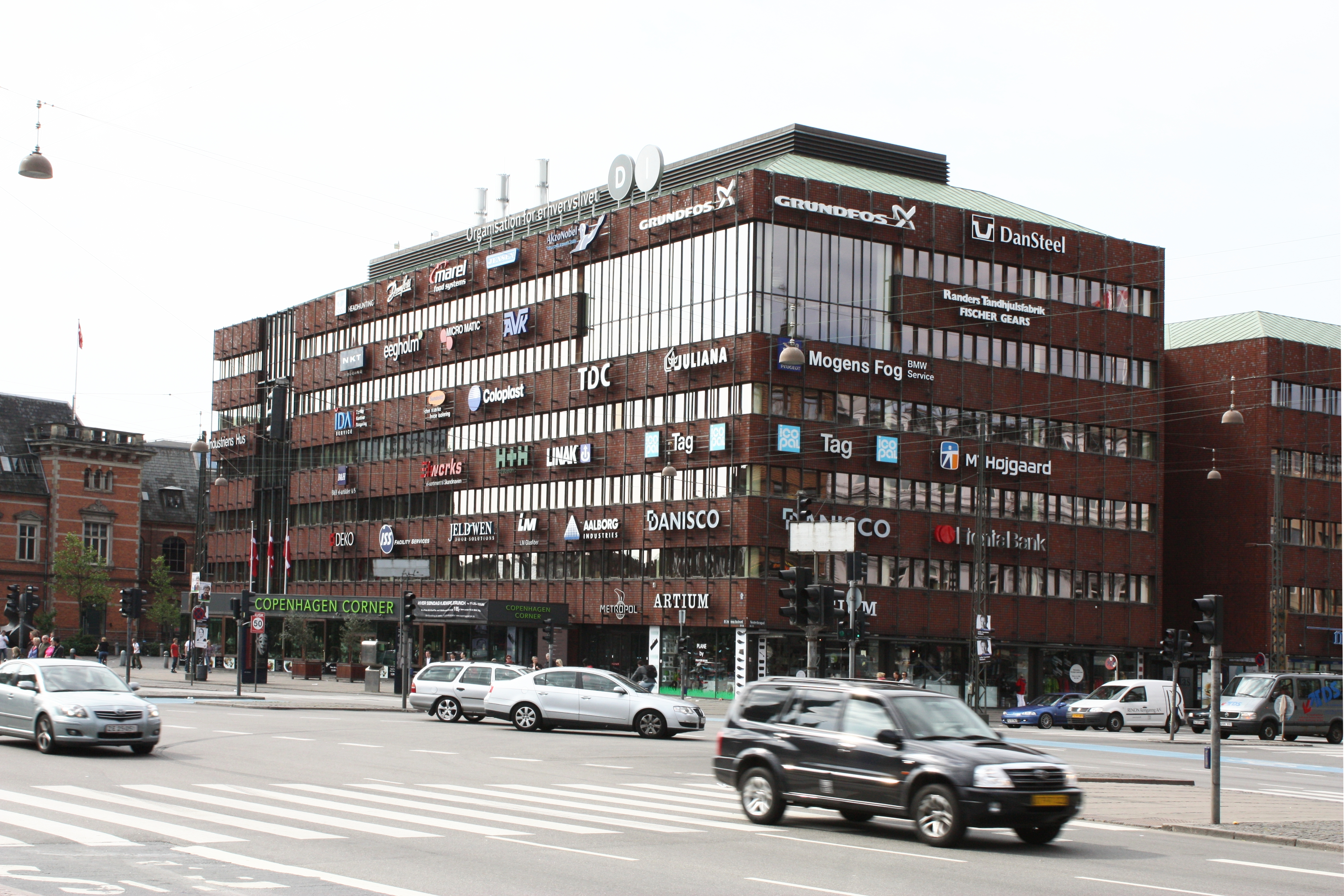
The old Industriens Hus, 2009

The old building gradually became more and more outdated and it was therefore decided to replace it with a new one. An architectural competition was won by Arne Jacobsen in 1965 but his proposal was met with fierce opposition and was never realized. After Jacobsen's death in 1971, Jørgen Buschardt was charged with the task of designing the building, first alone and later in association with Erik Møller, but their proposal was not realized either. In the end, a third proposal, created by Erik Møller alone, was finally approved. The old building was demolished in 1977 and the new one completed in 1979. The ground floor contained a shopping arcade, Rådhusarkaden ("The City Hall Arcade"). A glass pyramid was constructed in the central courtyard. It was used for exhibitions, conferences and concerts.

=== The new Industriens Hus ===
In 2010, the building had once again become too small and a competition for the expansion and redesign was launched. It was won by the small Danish architectural firm Transform. The new building was inaugurated in March 2013.

== Design ==
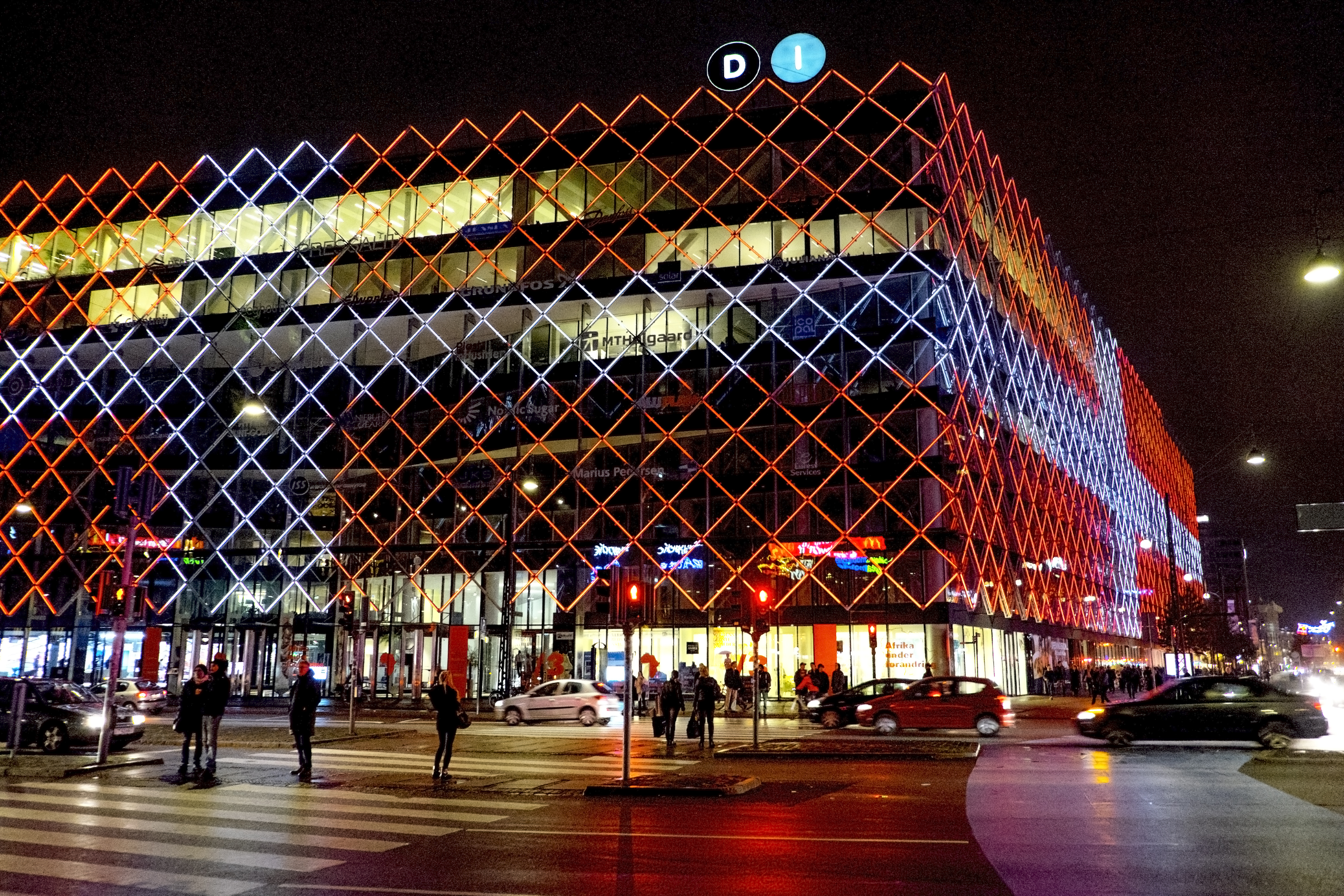
Industriens Hus by night

The renovation of Industriens Hus only retained the concrete decks and pillars of the original building. Two floors were added so that the building now reaches eight storeys towards the street while it gradually drops towards Tivoli Gardens to reduce the impact on the historic premises. The glazed façade consists of 3,331 5-square metres pieces of glass and features 3.9 km of LED panels with more than 80,000 diodes. The building has been criticized for its monotonous appearance in the daytime.

== House of Green ==
House of Green is an exhibition centre that showcases Danish green technologies and solutions. It was inaugurated on 5 September 2013.

== See also ==
- Niels Andersen (1835–1911)
