= Vesterbrogade =

Street in Copenhagen Municipality, Denmark

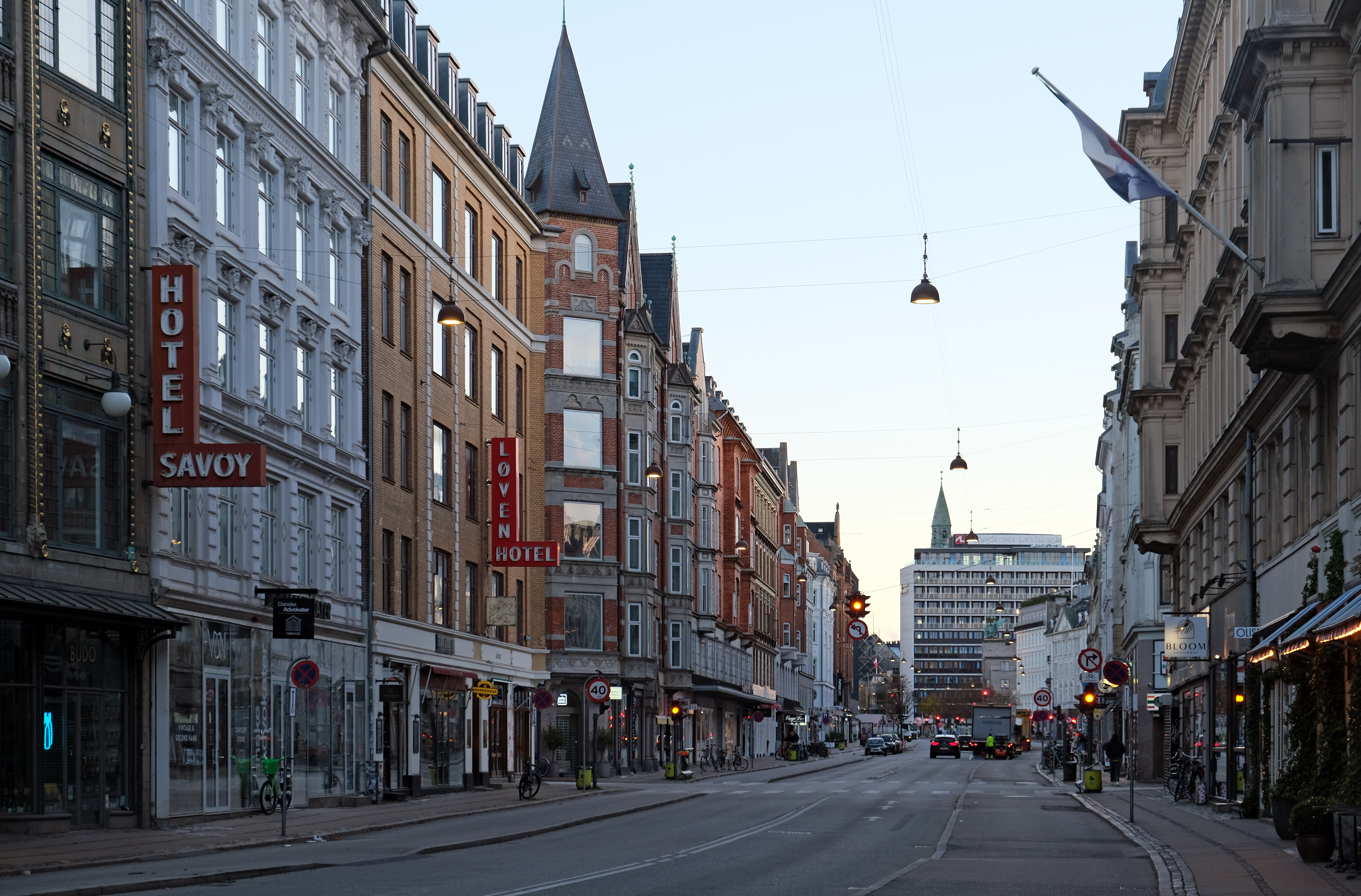
- Interactive map of Vesterbrogade
- Length: 2,450 m (8,040 ft)
- Location: Copenhagen, Denmark
- Quarter: Vesterbro
- Postal code: 1620, 1800
- Nearest metro station: Copenhagen Central Station
- Coordinates: 55°40′18″N 12°32′48″E
- East end: City Hall Square
- Major junctions: Enghavevej
- West end: Roskildevej

Vesterbrogade (Danish pronunciation: [vestɐˈpʁoˌkɛːðə]) is the main shopping street of the Vesterbro district of Copenhagen, Denmark. The 1.5 km long street runs from the City Hall Square in the east to Pile Allé in Frederiksberg in the west where it turns into Roskildevej. On its way, it passes Copenhagen Central Station as well as the small triangular square Vesterbros Torv. It is one of four such -bro streets, the other being Nørrebrogade, Østerbrogade and Amagerbrogade.

== History ==
=== Early history ===
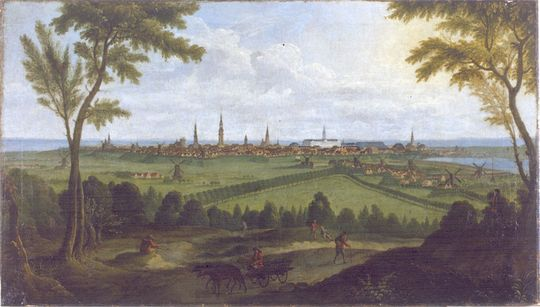
Vesterbrogade and Gammel Kongevej seen diverging each other from Valby Hill in 1758

Vesterbroghade originates in the 12th-century country road that led in and out of Copenhagen's Western City Gate. The road passed Sankt Jørgens Bæk (St. George's Stream) on its way to Valby and often changed course. On 20 August 1624, Christian IV ordered that the road be cobbled, first to Vernedamsvej and later all the way to Valby. The road was at this point called Alvejen "The Public Road"= or Adelvejen ("The Nobility Road") but in 1650 the name was changed to Roskildegaden ("The Roskilde Street").

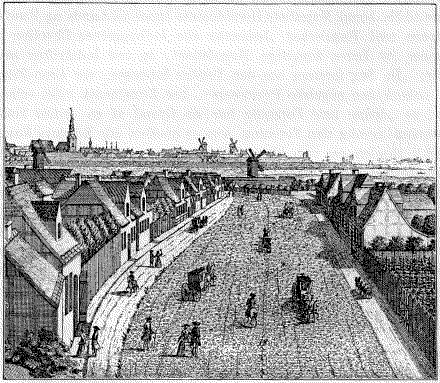
Vesterbrogade in 1761, drawing by Johan Jacob Bruun

Only buildings that could easily be burned down in the event of an enemy attack could be built outside the city's fortification ring and buildings along the road were therefore limited to a few inns and windmills until the middle of the 19th century when the city's old fortifications were finally decommissioned. It is one of four such -bro streets.

=== 19th-century urbanization ===
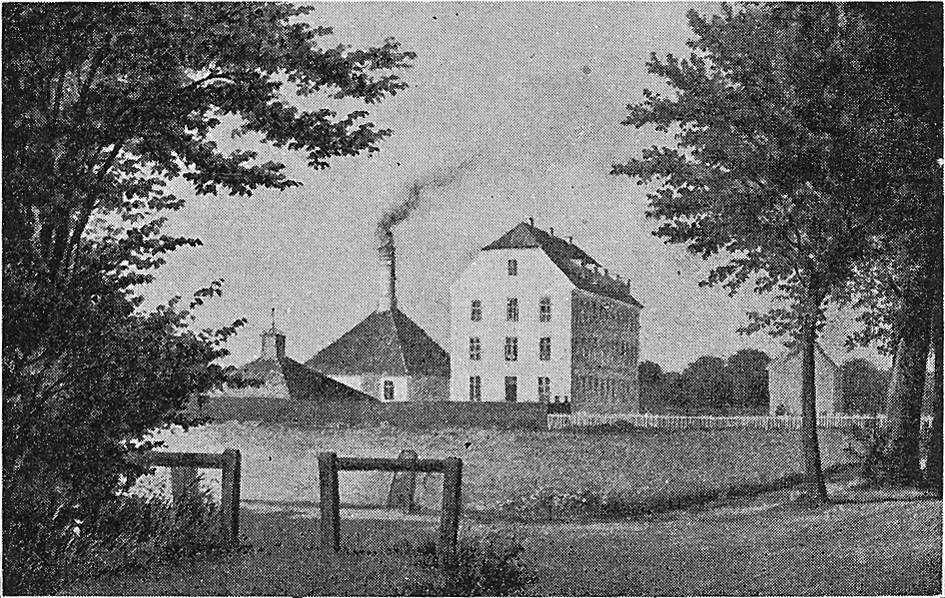
Bing & Grøndahl's factory in 1856

New buildings began to appear long the street in the 1850s. The Bing & Grøndahl porcelain manufactury opened on the street in 1853,

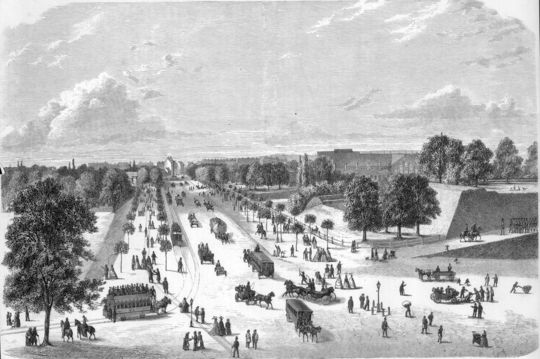
Vesterbros Passage in 1867

In 1857, the Western City Gate was demolished and the road was widerned considerably at the site which became known as Vesterports Hab ("The West Gate's Gap"). In 1866–67, Vesterbrogade was extended in a straight line from Tivoli to the Haymarket (now City Hall Square). The first section of the street, between the City Hall Square and the new Central Station, was laid out as a broad, tree-lined promenade. Among the buildings that were built along it, including Industriforeningen's new Exhibition Building from 1872 and National Scala from 1882.

=== 20th century ===
At the turn of the 20th century, Vesterbros Passage was the backbone in a westward expansion of Copenhagen's city centre. Most of the old buildings were replaced by new and larger ones over the course of the next decades.

== Notable buildings and residents ==
=== City Centre: Vesterbros Passage ===
Industriens Hus is the headquarters of the Confederation of Danish Industries. An expansion and complete make-over of the building was completed in 2013. Next to the building is the main entrance of Tivoli Gardens. Saxo Towers, a mixed-use complex consisting of four interconnected cylinders, is currently under construction on the other side of the street. Axelborg, originally a bank building, now contains the headquarters of the Danish Agriculture and Food Council. The former SAS Royal Hotel, now operated by Radisson Blu, was designed by Arne Jacobsen. His Egg and Swan chairs were designed for the building. Arbejdernes Landsbank has their headquarters in the so-called Panoptikon Building at No. 5.

=== Vesterbro: Vester Farimagsgade to Platanvej ===
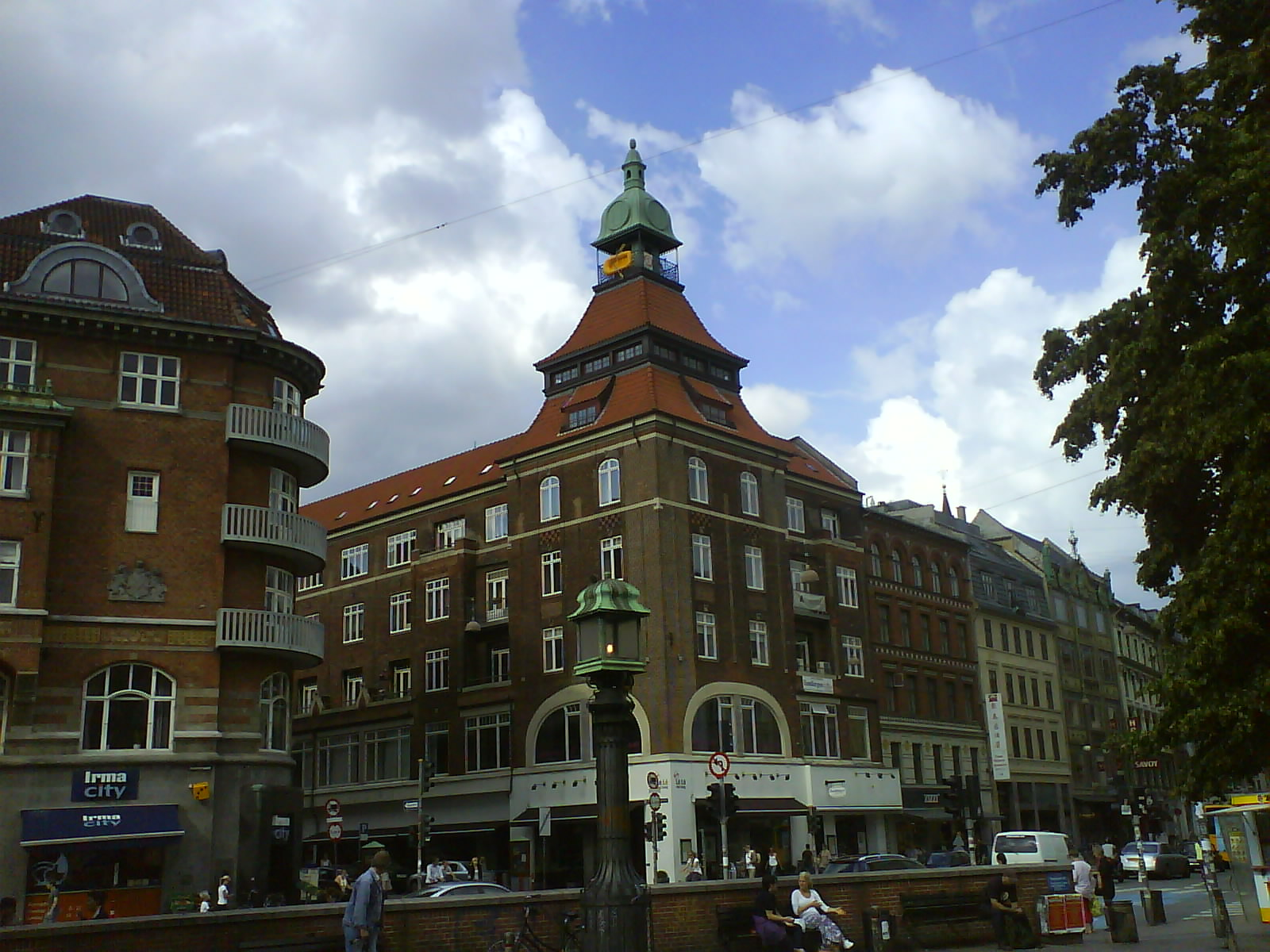
Vesterbros Torv seen from the other side

The small Savoy Hotel (No. 34), also known as Løvenborg, is one of the earliest examples of the Art Nouveau style in Copenhagen. The building was designed by Anton Rosen who a few years later also designed the two buildings that flank Det Ny Teater (No. 40–42) in the same style. The Association of Danish Law Firms is based at No. 32.

The Royal Copenhagen Shooting Society's former main building at No. 59 is from 1780s. It now houses the Museum of Copenhagen.

A passageway in No. 65-67 opens the street Westend.

The former Vesterbro Pharmacy (No. 72A) was built in 1853 to design by P.C. Hagemann. It also comprises two buildings in the courtyard from 1883. One of them, a former laboratory building, now contains the cocktail bar Lidkoeb.

Sorte Hest (No. 148A) is the only surviving inn of the "four horses". The building is from 1771.

The buildings at No. 144 is the former Tvedes Bryggeri, a brewery founded in 1852. The two buildings facing the street are from the 1880s and were listed in 1980 while the production buildings to the rear are not listed.

=== Frederiksberg: Platanvej to Pile Allé ===
Bing & Grøndahl's former premises (No. 149), now called Bing's, has been converted into an office complex. It consists of 12 buildings and has a total floor area of approximately 35,000 square metres. It is owned by Aberdeen Asset Management and was most recently renovated in 2015.

== Public art ==
The Liberty Memorial dates from 1797 and commemorates the abolishment of "Stavnsbåndet". Ole Christensen's sculpture The Flower of Vesterbro from 1990 stands on the corner of Vesterbrogade and Helgolandsgade.

== See also ==
- Værnedamsvej
- Dannebrogsgade
