= Bernstorffsgade =

Street in Copenhagen, Denmark

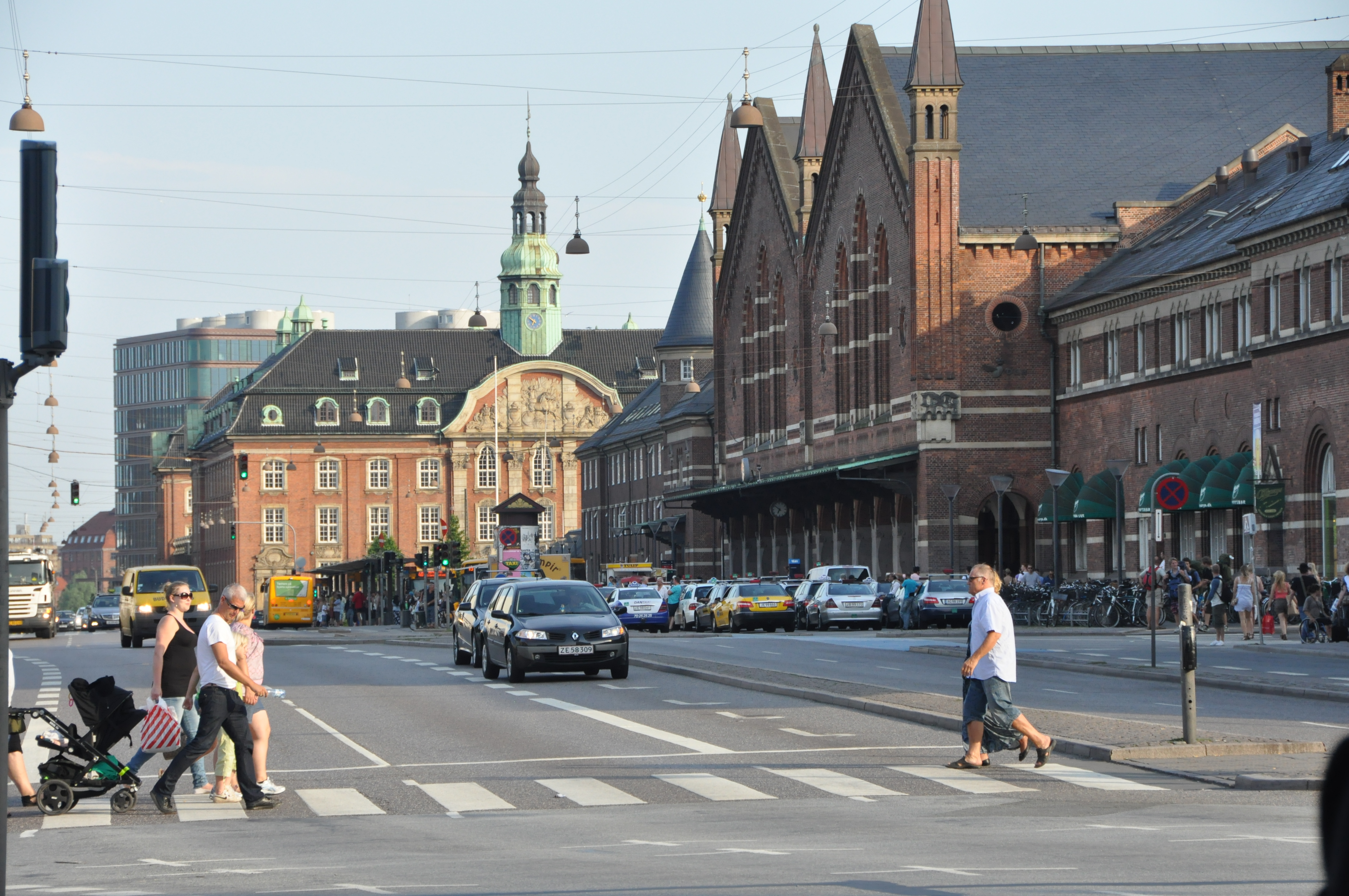
- Interactive map of Bernstorffsgade
- Length: 840 m (2,760 ft)
- Location: Copenhagen, Denmark
- Quarter: Indre By/Vesterbro
- Nearest metro station: Copenhagen Central Station
- Coordinates: 55°40′20.61″N 12°34′0.84″E
- Northwest end: Vesterbrogade
- Southeast end: Kalvebod Brygge

Bernstorffsgade is a street located next to Central Station and Tivoli Gardens in central Copenhagen, Denmark. It runs from Vesterbrogade in the northwest to Kalvebod Brygge on the waterfront in the southeast, and marks the boundary between the districts Indre By (City Centre) and Vesterbro.

== History ==
=== 19th century ===
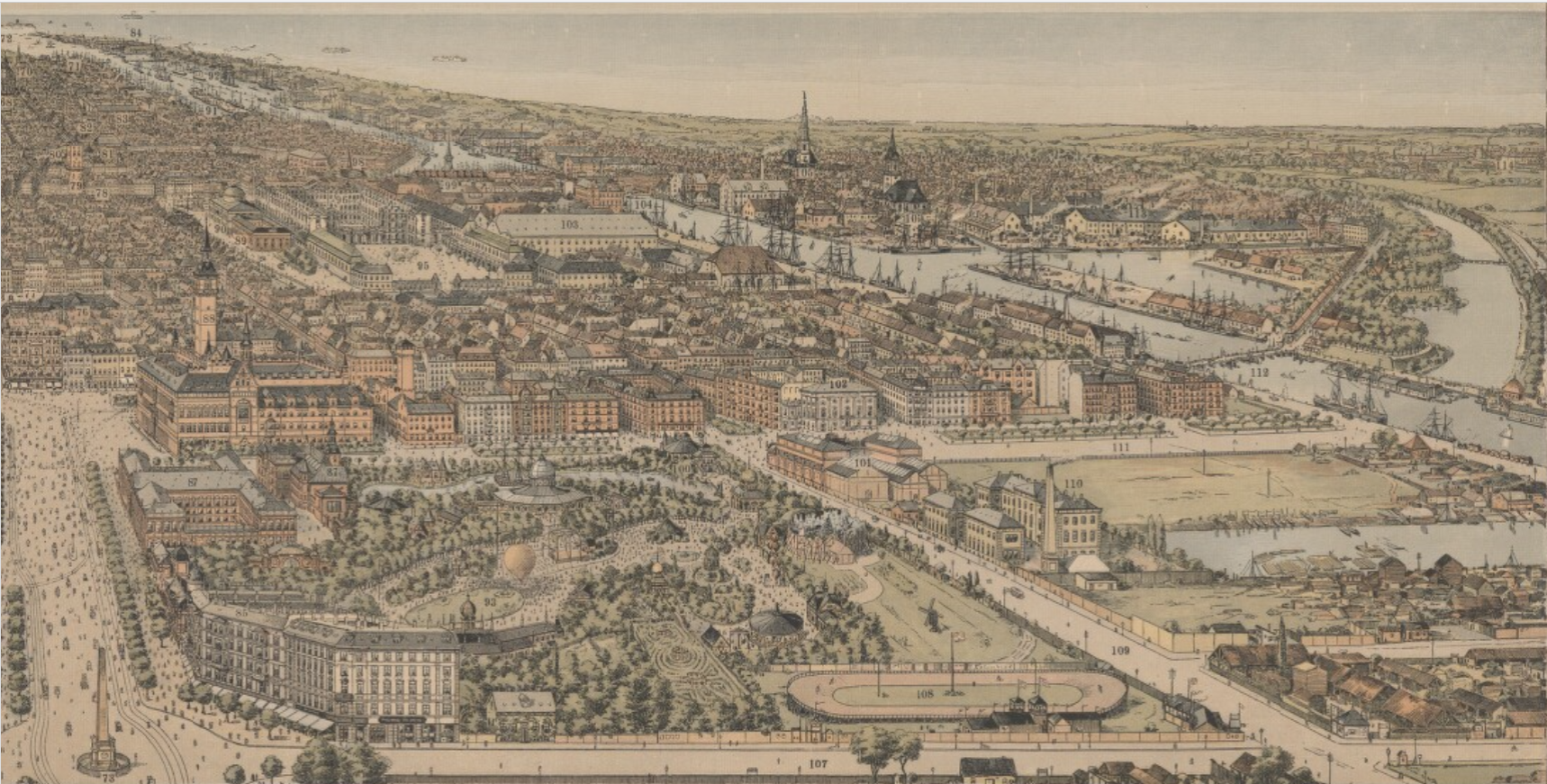
Bernstorffsgade in the very bottom of the picture with the cycle racing reacks, seen on a detail of an 1897 drawing by Franz Sedivý

Bernstorffsgade and the two parallel streets Reventlowsgade and Colbjørnsensgade were established in 1881. The three streets were named after Andreas Peter Bernstorff, Christian Ditlev Frederik Reventlow and Christian Colbjørnsen, three of the driving forces behind the peasant reforms of the 1780s. The section from Tietgensgade to Kalvebod Brygge was originally called Tømmerpladsgade (Timber Site Street) but it was merged into Bernstorffsgade in 1914.

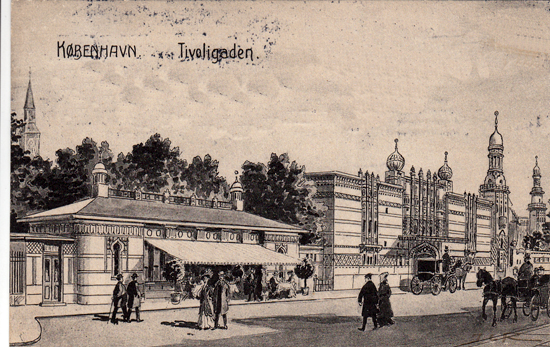
Postcard by J. L. Ridter:"The Tivoli Street"

Due to its location outside Copenhagen's West Rampart, in what had been known as Dronningens Enghave, the site was still dominated by open land, although Tivoli Gardens had opened at the site in 1843. Copenhagen's first railway station opened at an adjacent site in 1847 but had moved to the other side of Vesterbrogade in 1866.

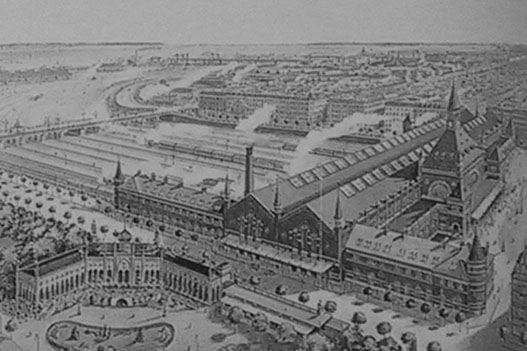
The new Central Station in 1911

Skandinavisk Panoptikon, a combination of a wax museum and a cabinet of curiosities established by Vilhelm Pacht, opened at the corner with Vesterbrogade in 1885. Cyclisten, a cycling club, constructed a 350 metres long cycle-racing track with canted curves, tribunes and restaurant at the street in 1893.

The cycle racing track was inaugurated on 22 May and was used for six-hour races for both men and women. It was joined by Copenhagen Goods Station in 1895–1901. The station was designed by DSB's head architect Heinrich Wenck.

=== 2+th century ===
The cycle-racing track was torn down in 1904 to make way for the new Central Station which opened in 1911. Bernstorffsgade was originally located a little further to the west (where Banegårdspladsen runs today) but was moved in connection with the construction of the new station.

In the 1960s, it was decided to replace the old Copenhagen Goods Station with a new Copenhagen Mail Terminal. The Copenhagen Mail Terminal was inaugurated on 15 November 1979 by Margrethe II and Prince Henrik. The planning had already commenced in early 1967 in collaboration with architects Holm & Grut. The building was originally supposed to be completed in 1973 byut in 1082 it was decided to extend it and it was therefore delayed.

== Notable buildings and structures ==
The block between Vesterbrogade and Tietgensgade is dominated by Copenhagen Central Station on one side and Tivoli Gardens on the other. The central Station was designed by Heinrich Wenck in the Historicist style. The Panopticon Building was replaced by a new headquarters for Arbejdernes Landsbank in 1954.

Tivoli Gardens has one of its two entrances opposite the Central Station. Next to it is the entrance to the Nimb Complex, featuring Nimb Hotel as well as a Hans Christian Andersen Bakery. The Tivoli Corner, designed by Pei Cobb Freed & Partners, is currently (2017) under construction at the corner with Vesterbrogade. It will contain new rooms for Hotel Nimb, a food court, restaurants and shops.

Copenhagen Central Post Building, located on the other side of Tietgensgade, was built at the same time as the Central Station and also with Wenck as architect. It was later expanded with a large post terminal in the 1960s. The whole site was sold in 2016. The old Central Post Building will be turned into an upscale hotel while the rest of the area will be cleared to make room for a mixed-use development with offices, hotel and apartments. The project is designed by Lundgaard & Tranberg and comprises several highrises of up to 120 metres. Lundgaard & Tranberg has also designed SEB Bank's two buildings at the corner with Kalvebod Brygge.

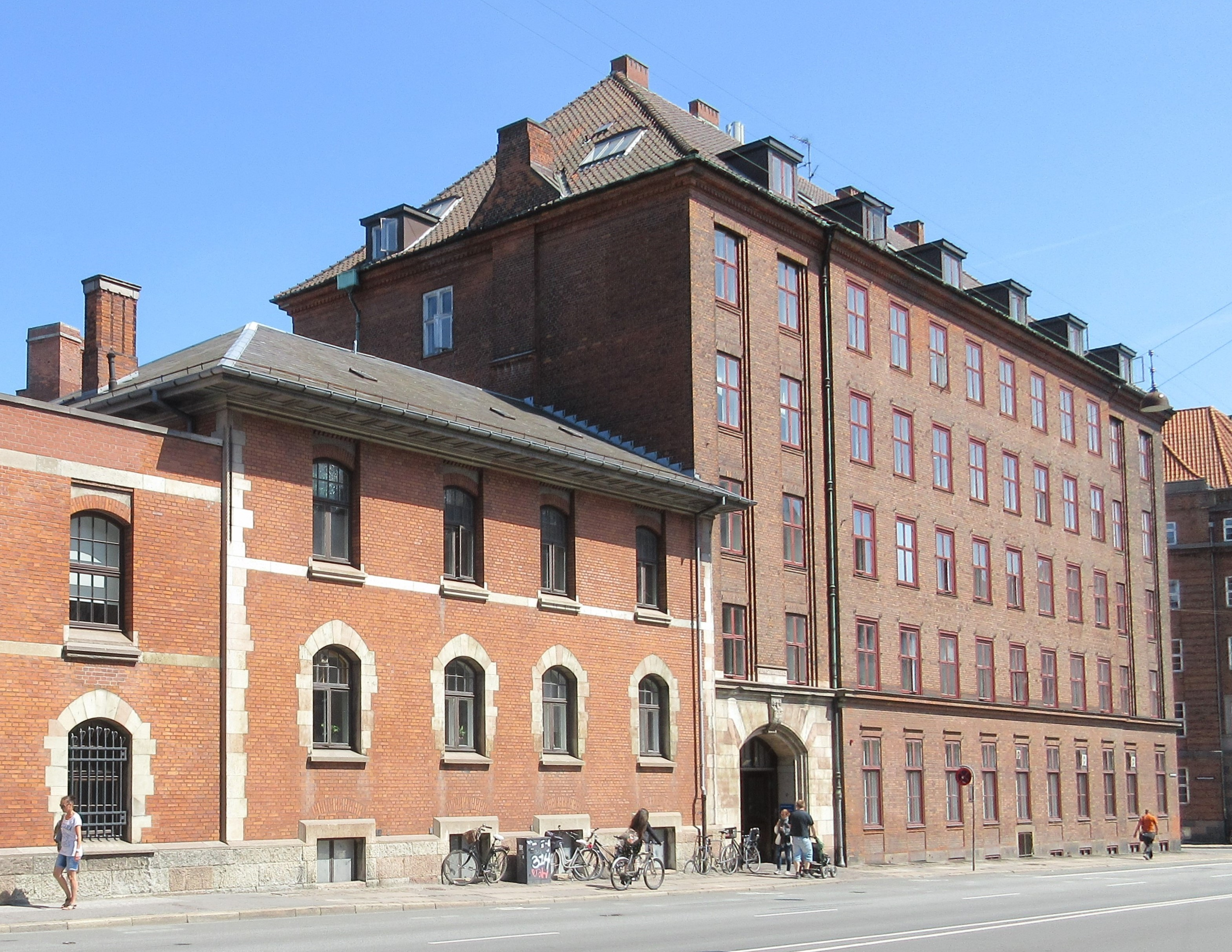
Part of the Western Power Station complex to the left and Copenhagen Municipality's building at No. 17 to the right

Across the street from the Central Mail Building is the former Western Power Station. Inaugurated by Københavns Belysningsvæsen in 1898, it was the second power station to be built in Copenhagen. The Historicist building was designed by city architect Ludvig Fenger and features a turret topped by a large lantern at the corner. The disused plant has been converted into a district cooling plant and administration office for HOFOR, Greater Copenhagen's largest utility company.

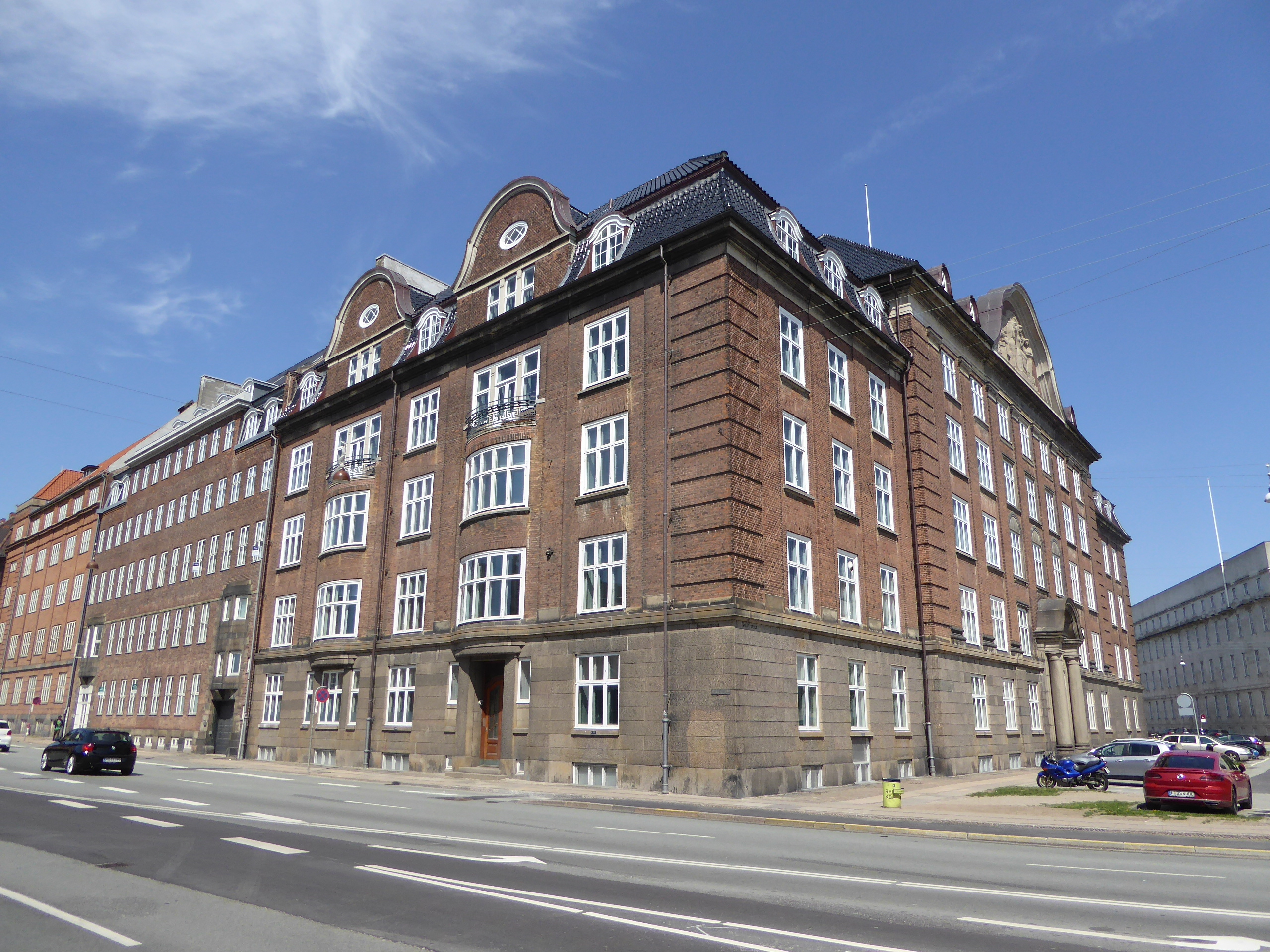
Rigspolitiet's building

Bernstorffsgade 21 is the former home of The Church Association for the Inner Mission in Denmark. The building is from 1916 and was designed by Arthur Wittmaack. It is now used by Copenhagen Municipality. The neighboring building at No. 23. was designed by Albert Oppenheim. The next building, which fronts Polititorvet (Polititorvet 14), was completed for the insurance company Arbejdsgivernes Ulykkesforsikring in 1914 to design by Knud Arne Petersen. Rigspolitiet is now based in the building. The building on the other side of Polititorvet is the headquarters of Falck.
