= Colbjørnsensgade =

Street in Copenhagen, Denmark

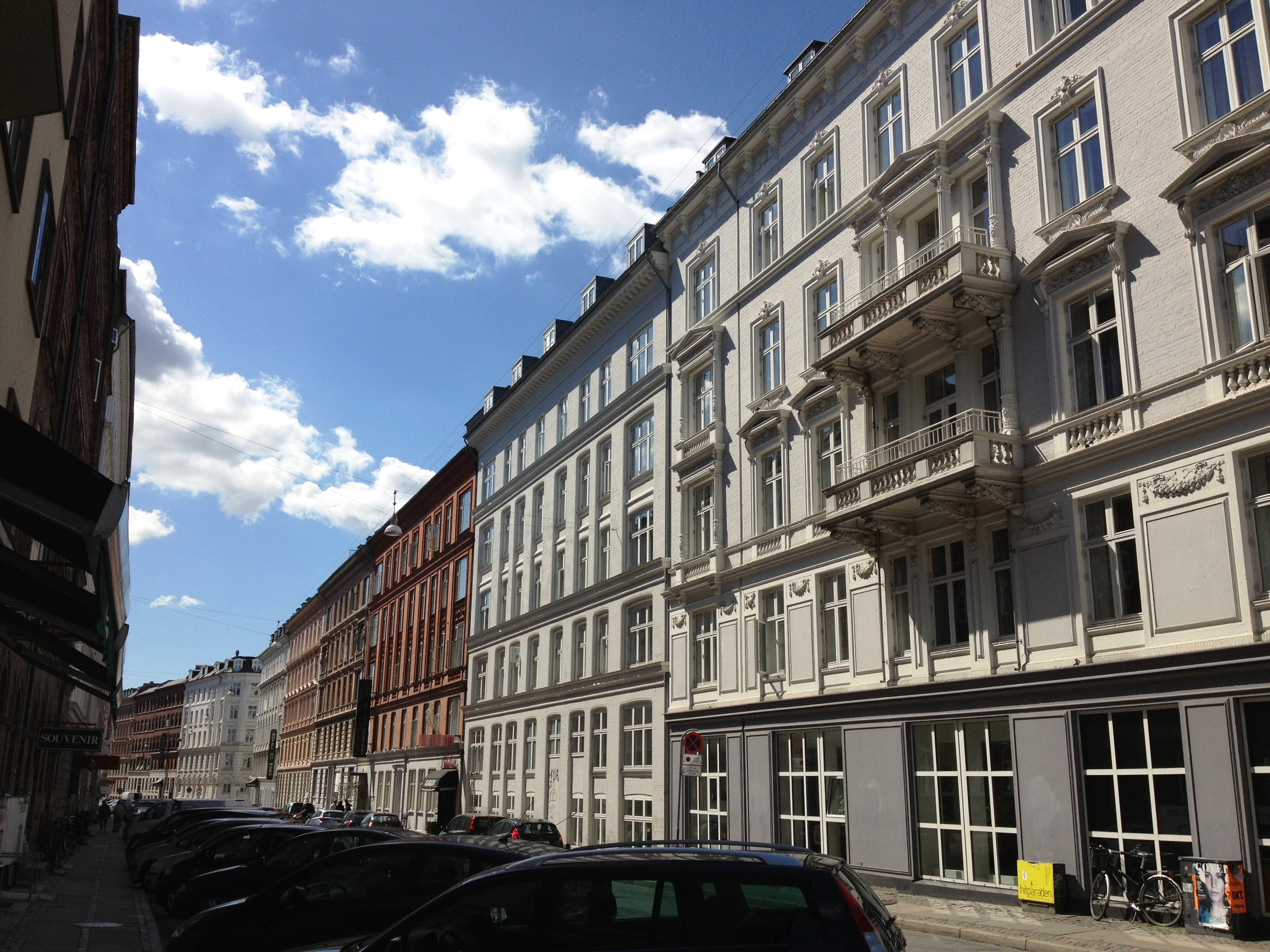
Colbjørnsensgade

Colbjørnsensgade is a street in the Vesterbro district of Copenhagen, Denmark. It runs from Vesterbrogade in the northwest to Tietgensgade in the southeast and is intersected by Istedgade. Located just one block from Copenhagen Central Station, the street is completely dominated by hotels.

== History ==
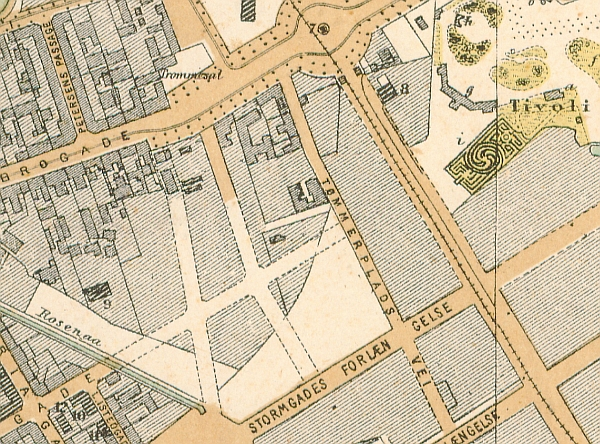
The still unnamed street seen on a map detail from circa 1880

Colbjørnsensgade and the two parallel streets Reventlowsgade and Bernstorffsgade were planned in 1881. The three streets were named after Andreas Peter Bernstorff, Christian Ditlev Frederik Reventlow and Christian Colbjørnsen, three of the driving forces behind the peasant reforms of the 1780s. The buildings along the street were not constructed until the 1890s.

== Notable buildings and residents ==
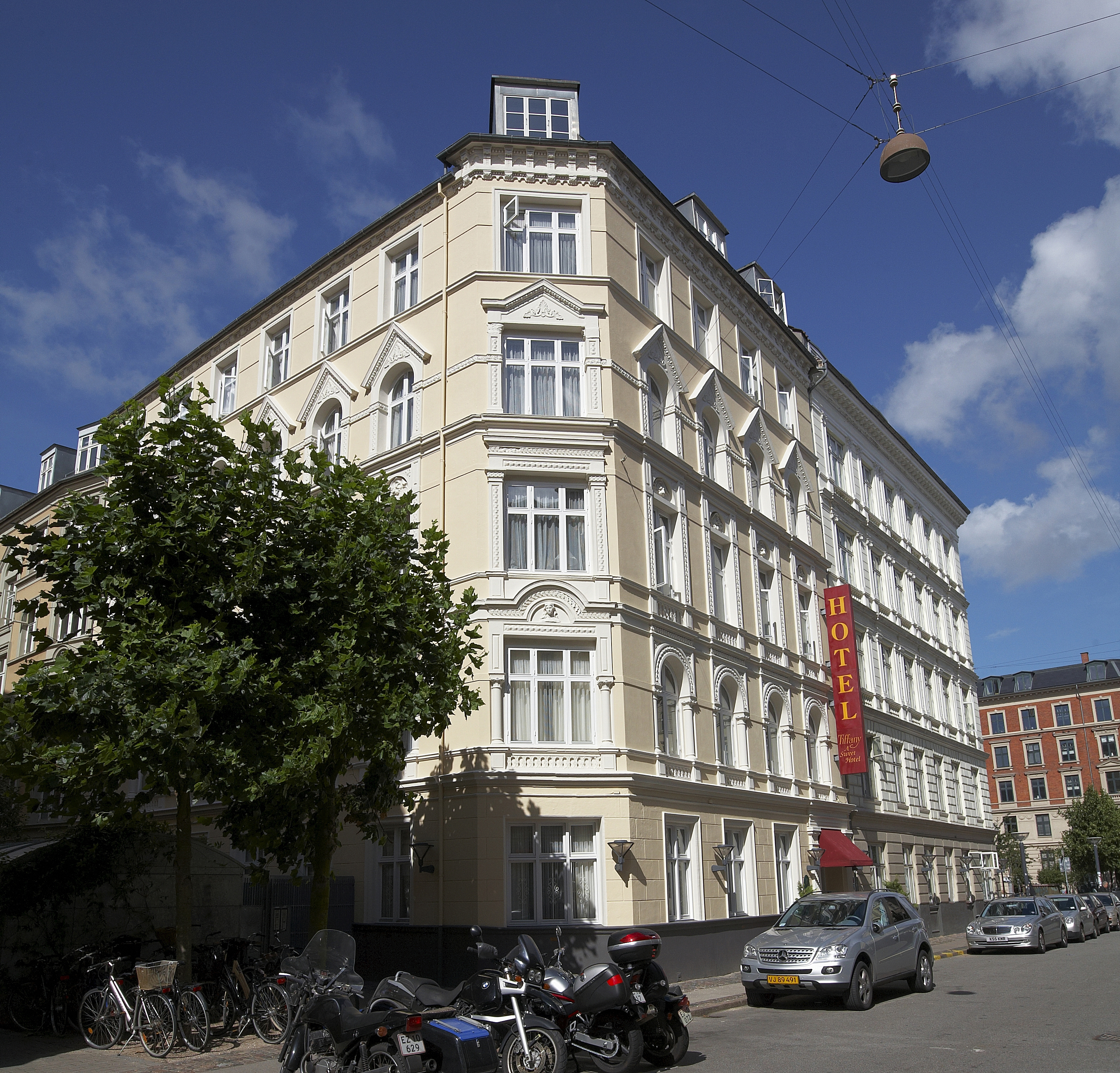
No. 28Hotel Tiffany

Hotels in the street include Meininger Hotel Copenhagen (No. 5), Hotel Union (No. 7), Hotel Urban House (No. 11), Omena Hotel København (No. 11), Good Morning City Copenhagen Star (No. 13), Hotel du Nord (No. 14), Saga Hotel (No. 18), Hotel Bjørnen (No. 27), Hotel Tiffany (No. 28) and Hotel Ansgar (No. 29). First Hotel Excelsior (No. 6) was merged into First Hotel Mayfair in Helgolandsgade on the other side of the block in 2017.

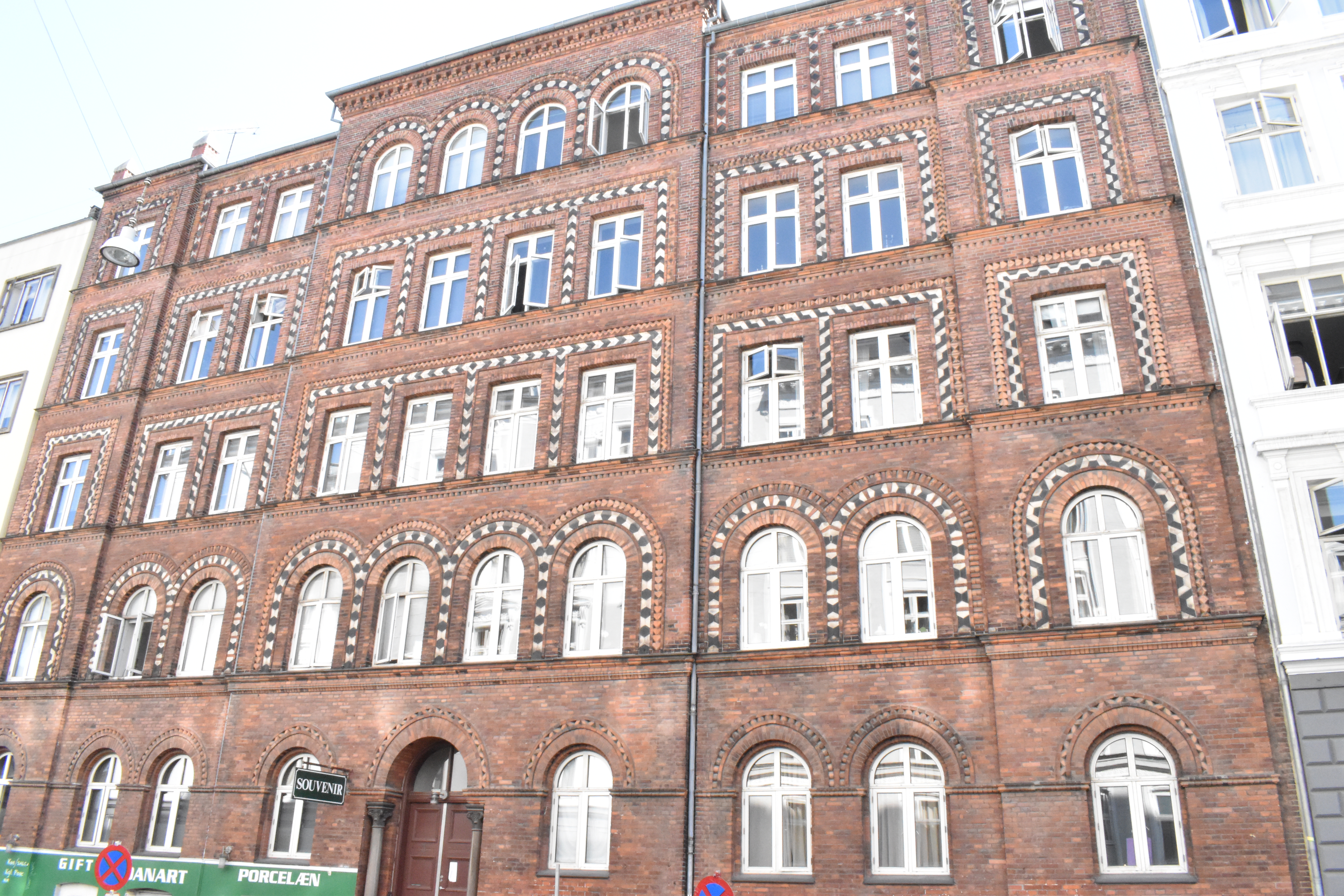
No. 3

No. 3 is from 1880 and was designed by Johannes Emil Gnudtzmann. No. 1 is from 1892 to 1894 and was designed by Georg Palludan. No. 6-8 are from 1892 and were designed by Julius Bagger.

== Cultural references ==
Mastodont-Svend, alias the Butcher of Colbjørnsensgade, is the archenemy of Klap-i-Olsen ("Shut-Up-Olsen") in Wikke & Rasmussen's parodic 1980s DR television series Tonny Toupé Show.
