= Louise Nimb =

Danish restaurateur and cookbook author

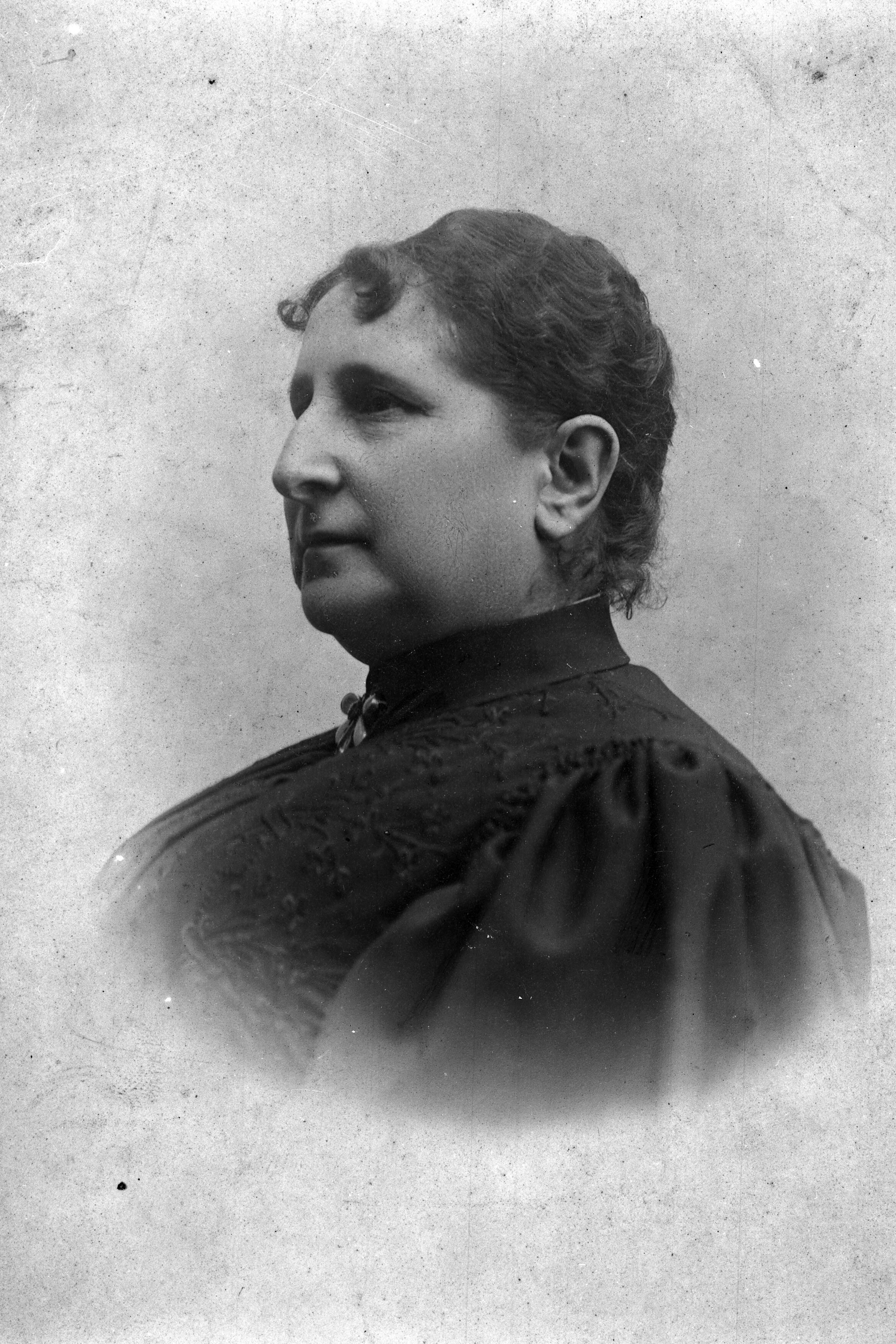
- Undated photo of Nimb
- Born: 9 October 1842; Holstebro, Denmark
- Died: 3 May 1903 (aged 60); Copenhagen, Denmark
- Occupation: Restaurateur
- Known for: Fru Nimb's Kogebog (Mrs Nimb's Cookbook) and other cookbooks
- Spouse: Vilhelm Christopher Nimb

Louise Sophie Thora Nimb (9 October 1842 – 3 May 1903) was a Danish chef and owner-manager of several restaurants in Copenhagen in the 19th century. Her cookbook, Fru Nimb's Kogebog (Mrs. Nimb's Cookbook), was published in 1888, and reissued in 1996. Other books she published include the didactic novel Karen (1894), the Menu series and Utilisation of Vegetables for Vegetarian Dinners (both 1896), a menu dictionary in French, English, German, and Danish (1899), and Cookbook and Menus for Diabetic Patients (1900). Nimb also published Denmark's first book with recipes for tomatoes, in 1900.

== Early life ==
Louise Sophie Thora Nimb was born in Holstebro in Denmark on 9 October 1842. She was the youngest of nine children. Her father, Aron Abraham Gunst, was a Jewish merchant who had moved to Holstebro from Dresden in Germany. Her mother, Zerina Dellevie, had been born in Hamburg of Italian parents. She was both a skilled housewife and someone who helped her husband with his business. She also took an active part in the social life of Holstebro.

Louise Gubnst learned housekeeping and cooking from her mother and from the family maid. In 1852, the family moved to the Danish capital of Copenhagen, where Nimb attended Miss Rosa Bendixen’s School.

== Marriage and career ==
At the age of 18, in 1861, Gunst married Vilhelm Christopher Nimb. They had two daughters, Henriette and Zerina Emilie, and a son, who died shortly after birth. Together, the couple took over the running of an inn, called Nyholte Kro, which her father-in-law owned. The inn picked up business from stagecoaches, passing landowners and sometimes royalty. Nimb designed the inn so that it was comfortable, with a living room with a fireplace just for ladies. She improved her cooking skills by working with the inn's skilled and experienced cook. The arrival of the railways made the business unviable, so the Nimbs took over a restaurant in the Student Union (Studenterforeningen) in Copenhagen. They expanded their activities in 1868 with the restaurant Nytorv 3 and the restaurant in the Danish parliament. In 1872 the Nimbs opened their first restaurant in Copenhagen's Tivoli Gardens, five years later gaining ownership of Divan 2 on the lake in the same park, which came to be known as "Nimb's Terrace". In her hands the Divan 2 changed style and character, as it was contractually obligated to serve cold and warm dishes, and it began to attract members of the upper class. As one journalist wrote, Nimb "civilized the Copenhagen restaurant life." Nimb's two daughters joined the effort and were given increasing responsibilities. Henriette was only 17 years old when she took over the management of a restaurant from her parents.

The Nimbs continually expanded their business. In 1882 they took over a restaurant in the Industrial Association (Industriforeningen), management of which they later passed to their daughter, Zerina. In 1885, they opened a restaurant in the Panoptikon, a wax museum opened by the former director of the Tivoli, Bernhard Olsen, and soon after the family helmed a restaurant in the Erichsen Mansion, a building on Kongens Nytorv that had just been restored. The Nimbs took ownership of the restaurant in the Officers' Association and in 1896 the one in the Noblemen's Club. The family also offered catering and hosted parties at their home for up to 30 people. Louise Nimb also organized classes for housewives at her home. In 1889, Vilhelm Nimb presenting the couple's culinary take on Danish smørrebrød at the Universal Exposition in Paris.

Despite their wide-ranging activities the family never grew wealthy (they travelled frequently to Italy, France, and Germany). In 1880 the Nimbs were taking in a lodger, the Danish writer Herman Bang, who was to write about Louise upon her death in 1903.

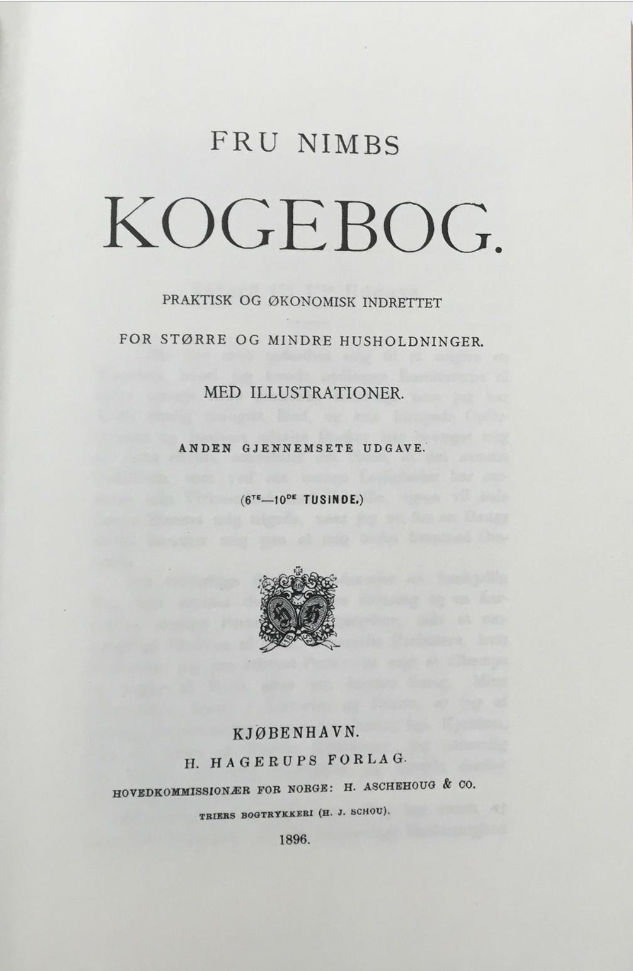
Mrs. Nimb's Cookbook (1896 edition)

=== Written works ===
Fru Nimb's Kogebog (Mrs. Nimb's Cookbook), published in 1888, presented to the Danish public international, French-style cuisine for the first time in the Danish language. It included the classical repertoire of French dishes as well as German, English, and Danish meals. The target audience were ladies with private homes, as well as their cooks, as a kind of a handbook that enabled them to prepare large and small dinners: The cookbook was for dinner parties, but could also be used for everyday meals. In 1896, Nimb published the book, Utilisation of Vegetables for Vegetarian Dinners, with the menus she developed for the Gardening Exhibition at Tivoli Gardens in 1894. Nimb also published a book on jam making the same year and a book on pickles in 1897.

In 1894, Nimb published Karen, a didactic novel. The book was named after the maid, Karen Jensen, from Nimb's childhood home. The protagonist is young when she leaves school and must go to serve as a maid without ever having learned how to perform domestic chores. The novel aims to fill in this knowledge.

In 1899, Nimb published a menu dictionary in French, English, German, and Danish and the following year a small book with recipes for tomatoes, the first in Denmark. Nimb collaborated with a horticultural theorist about the jam book and with a doctor for Cookbook and Menus for Diabetic Patients, published in 1900. Nimb, herself, had diabetes.

== Legacy ==
Nimb's daughters continued the restaurant businesses, but Louise's cookbook, which ran to three editions during her lifetime, slowly went out of vogue only to be republished in 1996. Her daughters opened the Fru Nimb restaurant in the Tivoli Gardens in 1909 which still stands. In 1930 the Danish Broadcasting Corporation made Nimb famous across the country with live broadcasts of contemporary dance music from the restaurant. Two other restaurants and two bars continued to bear the Nimb name in 2022. The name also lives on in the Nimb, a luxury, suites-only hotel in the Tivoli Gardens containing the most expensive hotel suite in the country, named Louise.

== Death ==
Nimb died in Copenhagen on 3 May 1903. Her remains are buried in the same plot in Søllerød as her husband and two daughters.
