= Sophie Amalienborg =

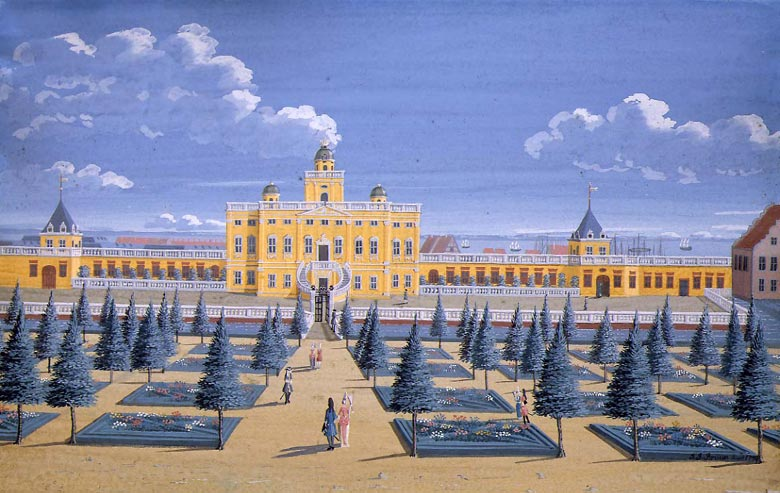
- Sophie Amalienborg, gouache by Johan Jacob Bruun (1740)

General information
- Architectural style: Baroque
- Location: Copenhagen, Denmark
- Construction started: 1669
- Completed: 1673
- Demolished: 19 April 1689
- Client: Queen Consort Sophie Amalie

Design and construction
- Architect: Albertus Mathiesen. (attributed)

Sophie Amalienborg was a pleasure palace roughly located where Amalienborg stands today in Copenhagen, Denmark. It was built by Queen Consort Sophie Amalie who lived there until her death in 1685 after her husband, King Frederick III, died a few years prior to its completion.

It burnt down to the ground on 19 April 1689 in a fire which caused many casualties. A second Sophie Amalienborg was built at the site but demolished to make room for the development of Frederiksstaden.

== History ==
=== Construction of the new pleasure palace ===
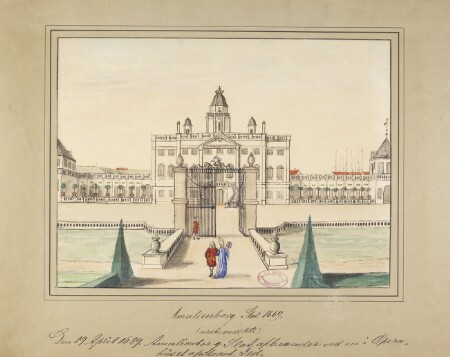
Sophien Amalienborg in 1669.

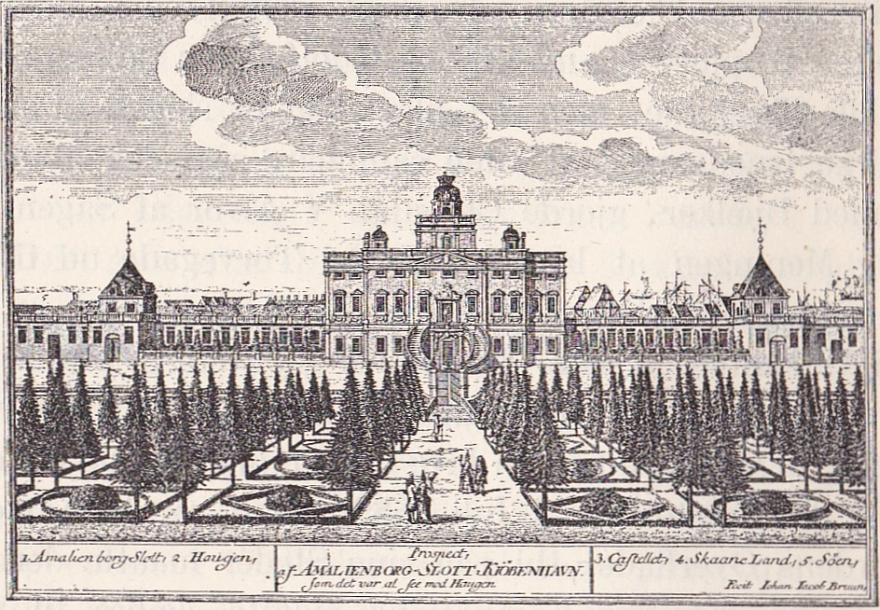
Sophien Amalienborg.

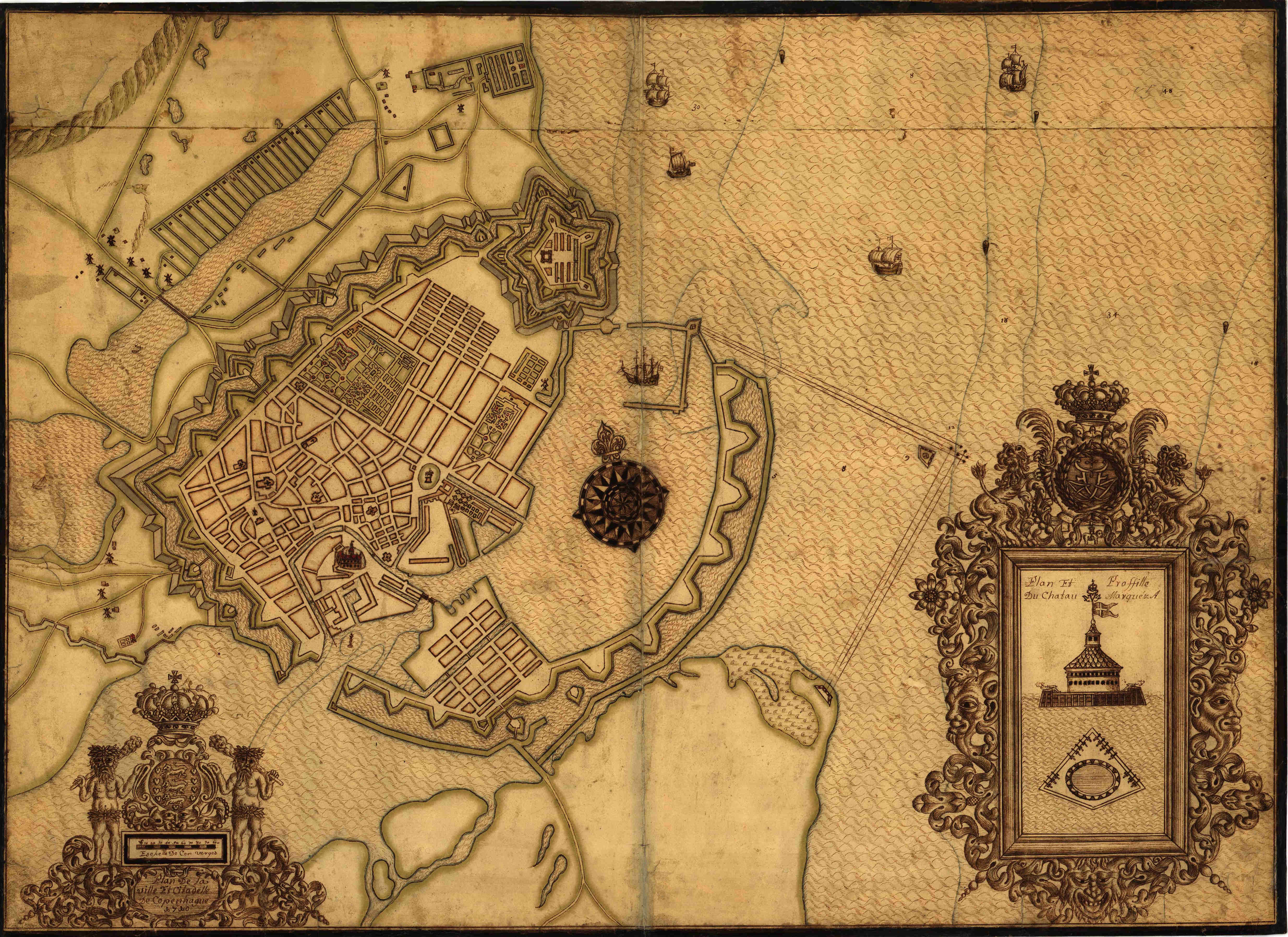
Sophie Amalienborg's garden seen to the south-east of the larger Rosenborg Castle Gardens, halfway between the city centre in the bottom-left corner and Copenhagen Fortress in the upper right corner. Map from 1710.

Sophie Amalienborg was built as a replacement for Queen's Garden, a complement to King's Garden located outside the Western City Gate, which had been destroyed by the Swedish troops during their Siege of Copenhagen in the Second Northern War from 1658 to 60.

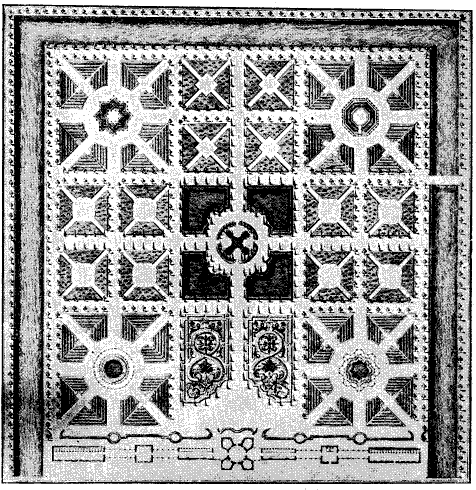
Garden plan from 1796

At the end of the war, Sophie Amalie acquired several pieces of land in the area known as New Copenhagen which had recently been incorporated into the walled city after the course of Eastern Rampart had been changed. The land had originally been acquired by King Christian IV early in the century. Other parts of the land had been used for Rosenborg Castle and Nyboder even before the changes in the course of the fortifications but the area east of Bredgade had remained undeveloped.

The queens acquisitions occupied an area roughly defined by present-day Bredgade, Frederiksgade, Amaliegade and Sankt Annæ Plads. Work on the garden began in 1664 and from 1666 to 1667 the Frenchman Michel le Roy was responsible for its design, particularly that of the fountains and the water system. The pleasure palace was built from 1669 to 1673 after Sophie Amalie had succeeded in providing the necessary means in spite of the hard times following the war. It is unclear who was the architect of the building but it is generally attributed to Albertus Mathiesen. Another possibility is that le Roy was also involved in the design of the palace and not only the gardens. In early documents he is referred to merely as "Ingenieur", while he is later titulated "Baumeister der Koniginn".

The King died in 1670, and the Queen Dowager lived there until her death on 20 February 1685.

=== The end of the first Sophie Amalienborg ===
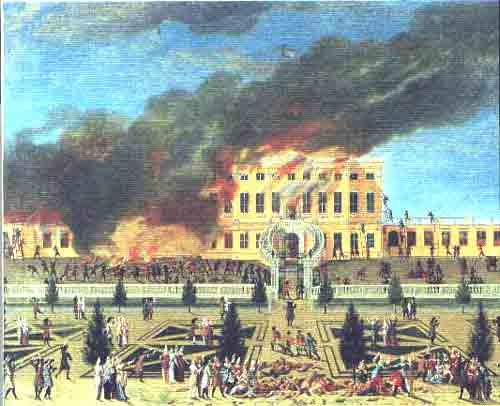
Sophie Amalienborg during the fire in 1689

After Sophie Amalie's death her son King Christian V took over the palace. He found it well suited for representative purposes and on 15 April 1689 it was the venue used for the celebrations of his forty-fourth birthday with the presentation of a German opera, perhaps, the first opera presentation in Denmark, in a specially built, temporary theatre building on the premises. The presentation was a great success, and it was repeated a few days later on 19 April. However, immediately after the start of the second performance a stage decoration caught fire, causing the theatre and the palace to burn to the ground, and about 180 people to lose their lives.

=== The second Sophie Amalienborg ===
The King planned to rebuild the palace, whose church, Royal Household and garden buildings were still intact. Ole Rømer headed the preparatory work for the rebuilding of Sophie Amalienborg in the early 1690s. In 1694 the King negotiated a deal with the Swedish building master Nicodemus Tessin the Younger, who spent some time in Copenhagen that summer, reviewing the property. His drawing and model were completed in 1697. However, the king ultimately found the plans too ambitious, and instead began tearing down the existing buildings that same year. The reclaimed building materials were used to build the new Garrison Church.

The second Amalienborg was built by Frederick IV at the beginning of his reign. It was a modest summerhouse, a central pavilion with orangeries, and arcades on both side of the pavilion. On one side of the buildings was a French-style garden, and on the other side were military drill grounds. The pavilion had a dining room on the groundfloor. On the upper floor was a salon overlooking the harbour, the garden and the drill grounds. This building was ultimately demolished to make room for Frederiksstaden.

== Architecture ==
Sophie Amalienborg was built in the style of a large three storey Italian villa suburbana with long one-storey lateral wings. The central wing had a high ground floor with a mezzanine. It had a flat roof lined by a balustrade and with a small tower in its centre.

== See also ==
- Architecture of Denmark
