= Helgolandsgade =

Street in Copenhagen Municipality, Denmark

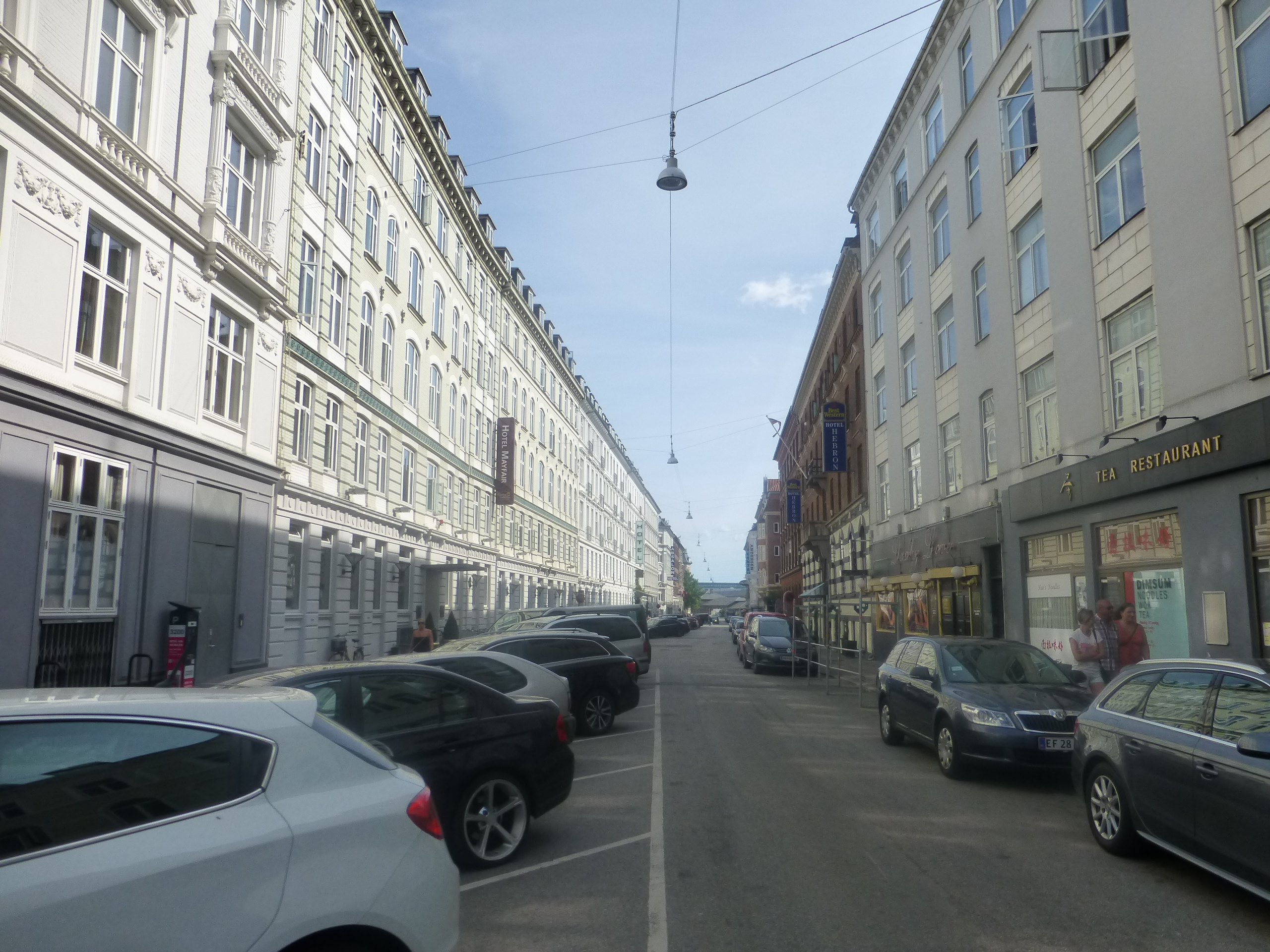
- Length: 269 m (883 ft)
- Location: Vesterbro, Copenhagen, Denmark
- Postal code: 1653
- Nearest metro station: Copenhagen Central Station
- Coordinates: 55°40′19.38″N 12°33′40.28″E

Helgolandsgade is a one-way street in the Vesterbro district of Copenhagen, Denmark. It runs from Vesterbrogade in the northwest to Halmtorvet in the southeast and is intersected by Istedgade. Located close to Copenhagen Central Station, the street is dominated by hotels.

== History ==
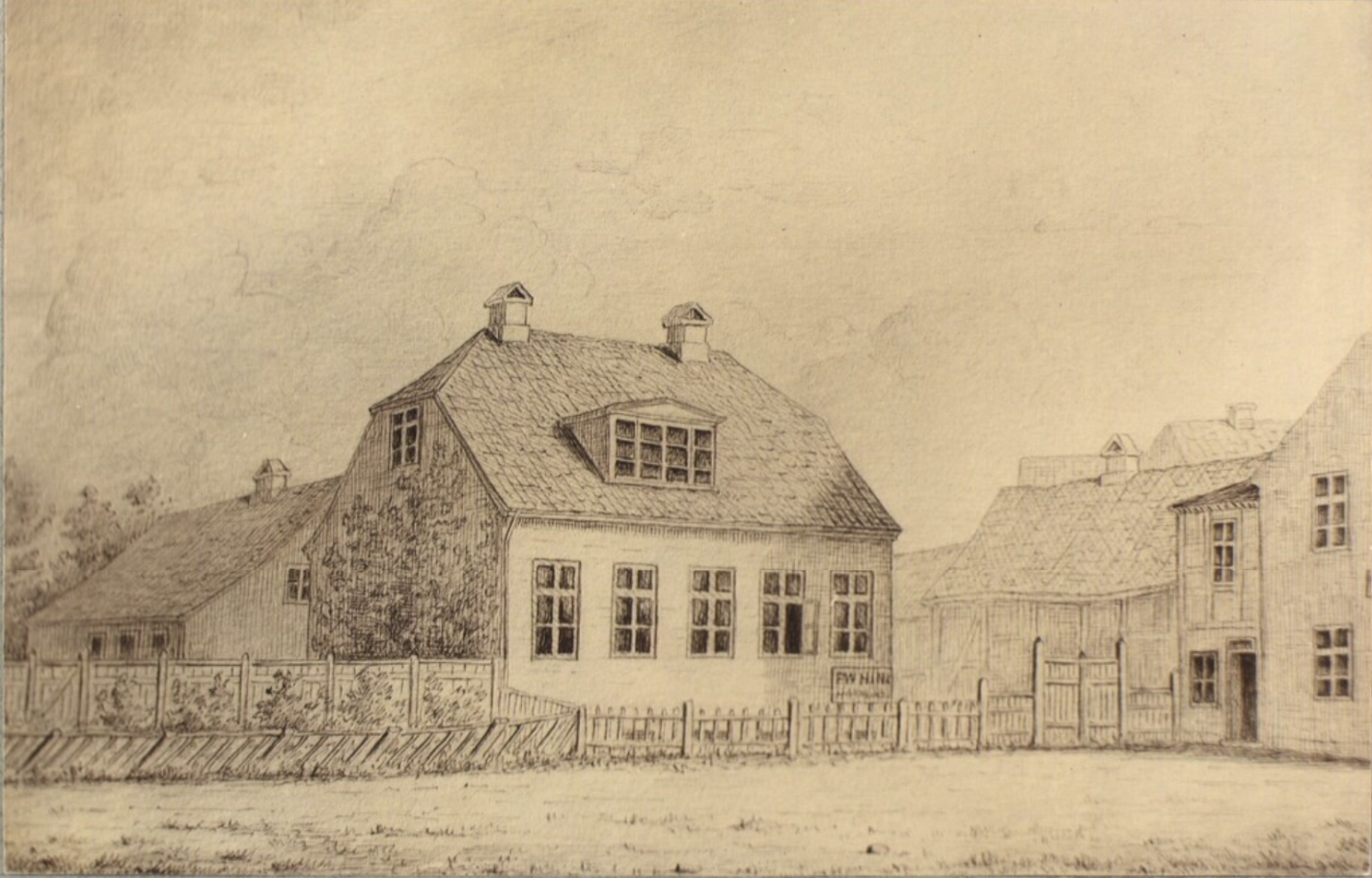
Gartner Hintze's house

Helgolandsgade was not established until circa 1880, making it one of the youngest streets in the Inner Vesterbro area. The site was prior to that part of Gartner Hintze's market gardens. The main building faced Vesterbrogade and the area down towards the railway (now Halmtorvet) was planted with fruit trees and fruit bushes. The street was named after the island of Helgoland to commemorate the Battle of Helgoland in 1864.

== Notable buildings ==
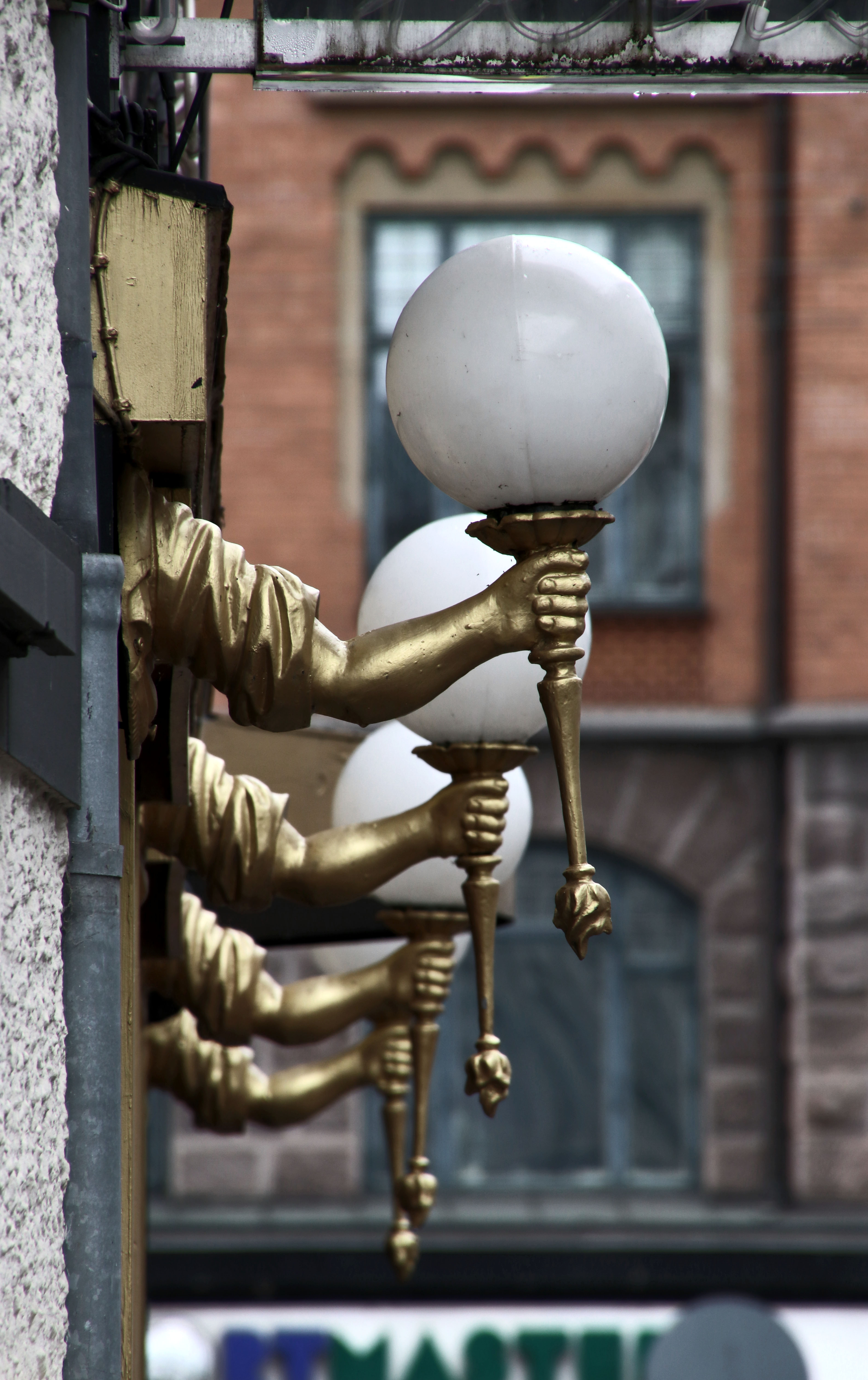
No. 4: Lanterns on the facade of the building next to Hotel Hebron

Many of the buildings in the street are hotels. Hotel Hebron (No. 4) was opened by the Inner Mission in 1898 and is still owned by the association. The building was designed by Christian Mandrup-Poulsen. The 200-room First Hotel Mayfair (No. 3) is operated by First Hotels. The chain's Hotel Excelsior in Colbjørnsensgade on the other side of the block was merged with the hotel in 2016. Hotel Axel Guldsmeden (No. 11) is Guldsmeden Hotels' flagship hotel in Copenhagen. The Andersen Boutique Hotel and Hotel Absalon, located on each their corner with Istedgade, are both operated by the Andersen Fonden.

Borgerdydskolen's former building (No. 6) was designed by Frederik Levy (1851–1924). The school was founded in Nørregade in 1787 and a branch was later opened in Christianshavn. It was later disjoined from the parent institution and moved to Helgolandsgade in 1893. Værnehjemmet Bethania (No. 8) was built as a home for unmarried women at the initiative of Regitze Barner. The National Romantic building was designed by Emil Jørgensen. No. 2 is from 1875 and was designed by Georg Wittrock and Johan Schrøder.
