= Nimb Hotel =

Hotel in Copenhagen, Denmark

Coordinates: 55.6736°N 12.5661°E

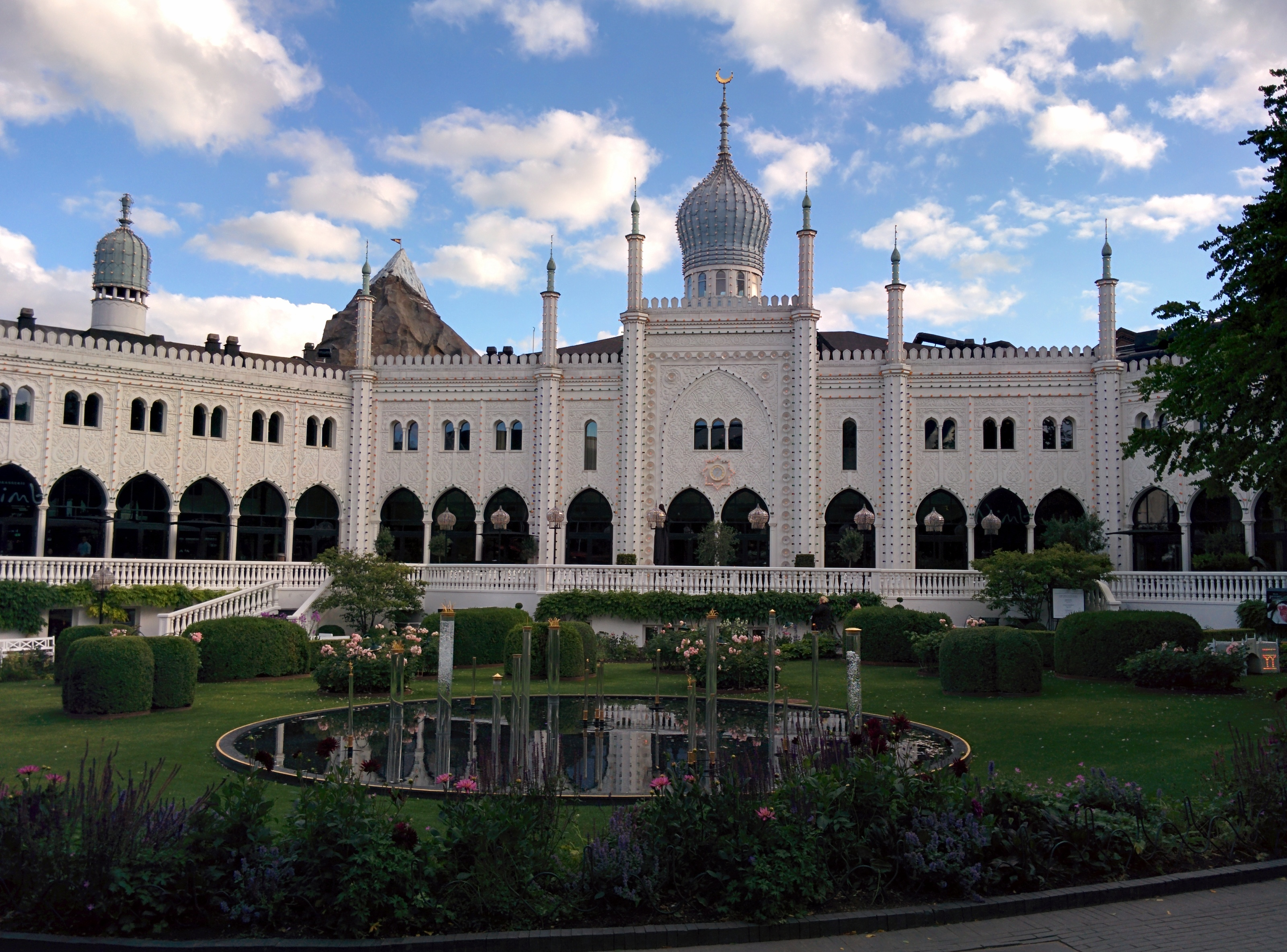
- Interactive map of the Nimb Hotel area

General information
- Location: Copenhagen, Denmark
- Opening: 2008; 18 years ago

Other information
- Number of rooms: 17
- Number of suites: 12
- Number of restaurants: 3
- Parking: Yes (Valet parking only)

Website
- Hotel web site

Nimb Hotel, or simply the Nimb, is a five-star boutique hotel in the Tivoli Gardens in Copenhagen, Denmark. The hotel is located in a historic building from 1909 and was built in a Neo Mudejar 19th century carnival style. The Nimb Hotel regularly appears in the top five-star Hotels lists, in 2009 Condé Nast Traveller ranked it as #40 on their list of the best hotels in the world.

== History ==
=== The first Bazaar Building ===
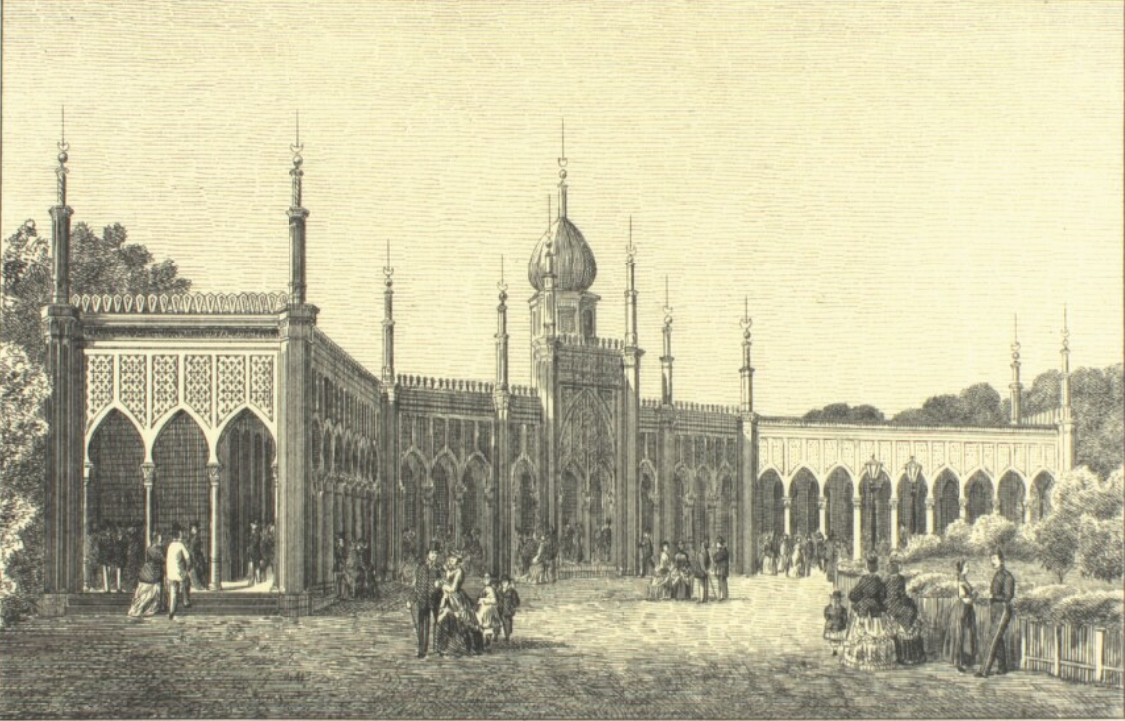
The first Bazaar Building.

When Tivoli opened in 1843, there was already a "bazaar in Chinese style" almost at the site of the current building. It housed shops and a restaurant but burned down in 1862. A new building in the same style was ready the following year.

=== The new building ===
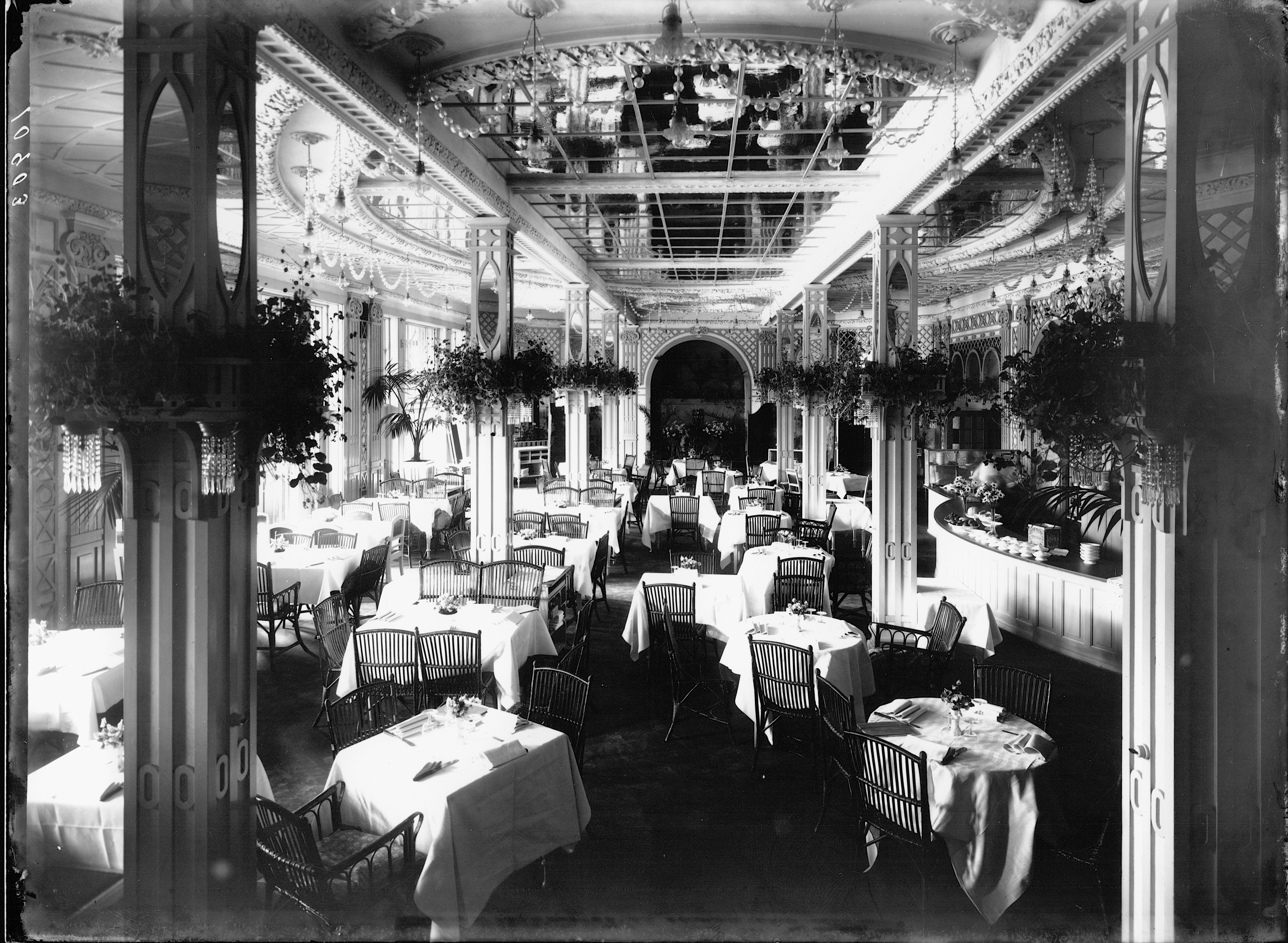
Restaurant Nimb photographed by Peter Elfelt in 1912.

The Bazar Building was torn down in 1908 in connection with the construction of Copenhagen Central Station. The existing building was built close to the original site, this time designed by architect and Tivoli director Knud Arne Petersen in Moorish style. It was inaugurated in 1909. It was initially used as an exhibition space, for instance for arts & crafts exhibitions, but also housed a restaurant.

The building took its name from Wilhelm and Louise Nimb, who had created a restaurant dynasty in Copenhagen. They were brought in by Tivoli to manage the restaurant Divan 2, which still exists. Under their supervision, it gained major popularity. It became a favoured hang-out for the city's establishment, colloquially known as Nimb's Verenda. The Nimb couple's two daughters, Henriette (1863 – 1919) and Serina (1865–1939), were brought up to take part in the family business and when the Bazar reopened in 1909, they took over the running of it. Later, the building housed various establishments but kept its name.

=== 2000s revival ===
In the 2000s, the building was subject to major renovation and reopening in 2008 as the Nimb Hotel, with a cluster of gourmet-oriented enterprises. Restaurant Herman, headed by Danish chef Thomas Herman, opened by head chef Thomas Herman in partnership with the LøgismoseGrønlykke family, received one star in the Michelin Guide just ten months after its opening in 2008. Herman left the restaurant in 2012. It was after that for a while continued as Nimb Louise.

== The Nimb today ==
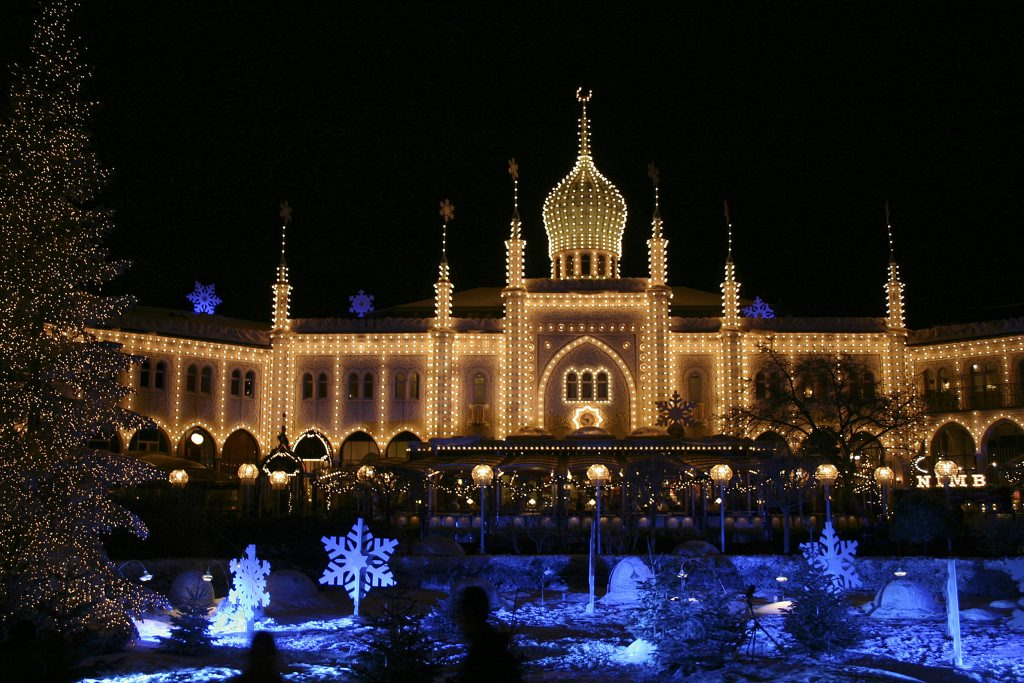
The Nimb by night

In October 2015 Nimb was awarded "Hotel of the Year" by Small Luxury Hotels (SLH) from 520 hotels across 82 countries around the world.

In addition to the hotel, the Nimb complex contains:

- Six concept driven restaurants and bars
- Nimb, a brasserie
- Cocktail bar with large murals from the Danish artist Cathrine Raben Davidsen
- Andersen Bakery Nimb, a Danish-inspired Japanese chain of bakeries

== See also ==
- Tivoli Gardens
