= Dronningens Enghave =

Coordinates: 55.672778°N 12.566586°E

Dronningens Enghave (lit. 'The Queen's Meadow Garden') was a seventeenth-century royal pleasure garden located just outside the Western City Gate of Copenhagen, Denmark, roughly where Tivoli Gardens and Copenhagen Central Station lies today.

== History ==
The garden was established by Queen Consort Sophie Amalie after her husband, Frederick III of Denmark, had been crowned in 1648. The garden had pavilions, fishing ponds and rare plants. As late as 1657, 40,000 bricks were used for a house on the premises but it was destroyed by the Swedish troops during their Siege of Copenhagen in the Second Northern War from 1658 to 1660 shortly thereafter. After the war Sophie Amalie established Sophie Amalienborg in its place.
