= Knud Arne Petersen =

Danish architect

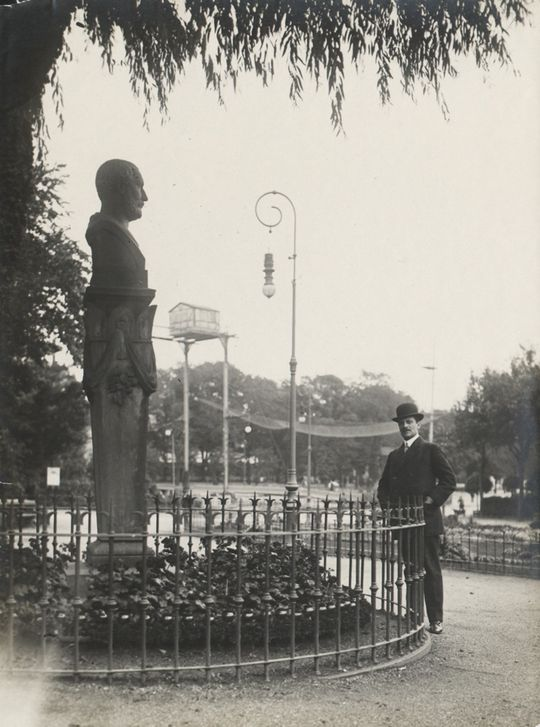
- Knud Arne Petersen at the bust of Georg Carstensen in Tivoli Gardens
- Born: August 5, 1862; Copenhagen, Denmark
- Died: June 27, 1943 (aged 80); Copenhagen, Denmark
- Education: Royal Danish Academy of Fine Arts
- Occupation: Architect
- Buildings: Nimb complex, Tivoli Gardens

Knud Arne Petersen (5 August 1862 – 27 June 1943) was a Danish architect and director of Tivoli Gardens in Copenhagen from 1899 to 1940. Apart from his engagement with Tivoli Gardens, where he created several prominent buildings, including the Chinese Tower and the Nimb complex, he was most active as an exhibition architect, representing Denmark at several World Fairs.

== Early life and career ==
Knud Arne Petersen was born on 5 August 1862 in Copenhagen, the son of draughtsman, art archaeologist and later professor Julius Magnus Petersen. He attended the Royal Danish Academy of Fine Arts from 1878 to 1885 and then worked as an assistant for the architects Vilhelm Petersen, his uncle, and Martin Nyrop.

== Exhibition architecture ==
Petersen's significantly contributed to the Nordic Exhibition of 1888 where he first held an administrative position as Industriforeningen manager, but later as its resident architect until 1927. In this capacity, he represented Denmark on the exhibition committees for a number of large exhibitions, including the World's Columbian Exposition in Chicago in 1893 and the Exposition Universelle in Paris in 1900. He was also active in the design of the Danish contributions and brought home several medals.

== Tivoli Gardens ==
In his work with the large exhibitions of the time, Petersen frequently collaborated with Tivoli Gardens and in 1899 was appointed as the amusement park's new artistic director, a position he held until 1940. He continued its tradition for festive, exotic architecture and introduced its distinctive illumination scheme. His first project was the Chinese Tower which was built to his design in 1900. He also designed the new Tivoli Concert Hall (1902) and the Nimb complex (1909), both with inspiration from Moorish architecture.

== Other pursuits ==
The more notable are Ny Christiansborg, a large residential building in a prominent location on Copenhagen's waterfront, and Klampenborg Racecourse in Klampenborg.

== Gallery ==
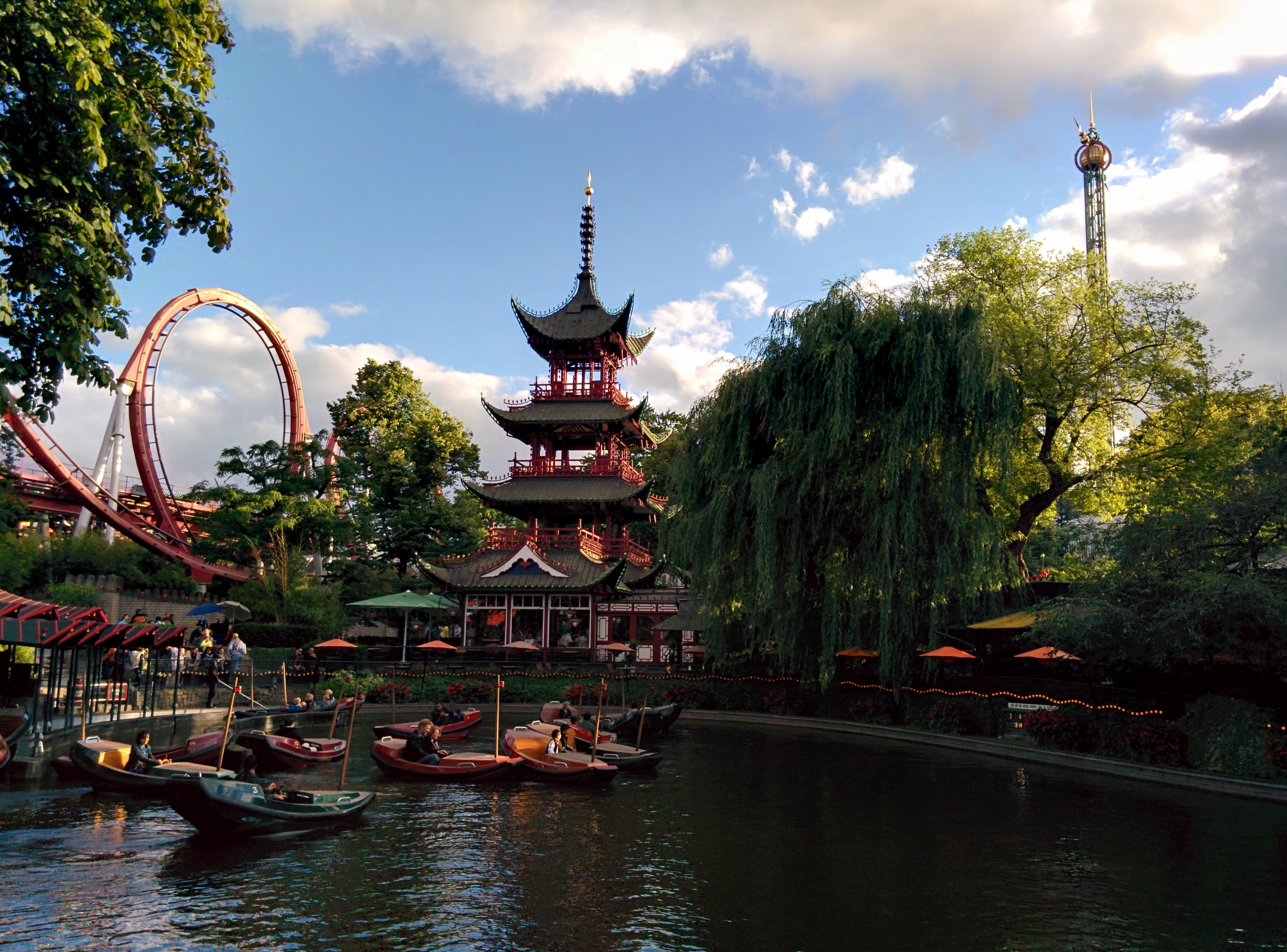
The Pagoda, Tivoli Gardens, 1900

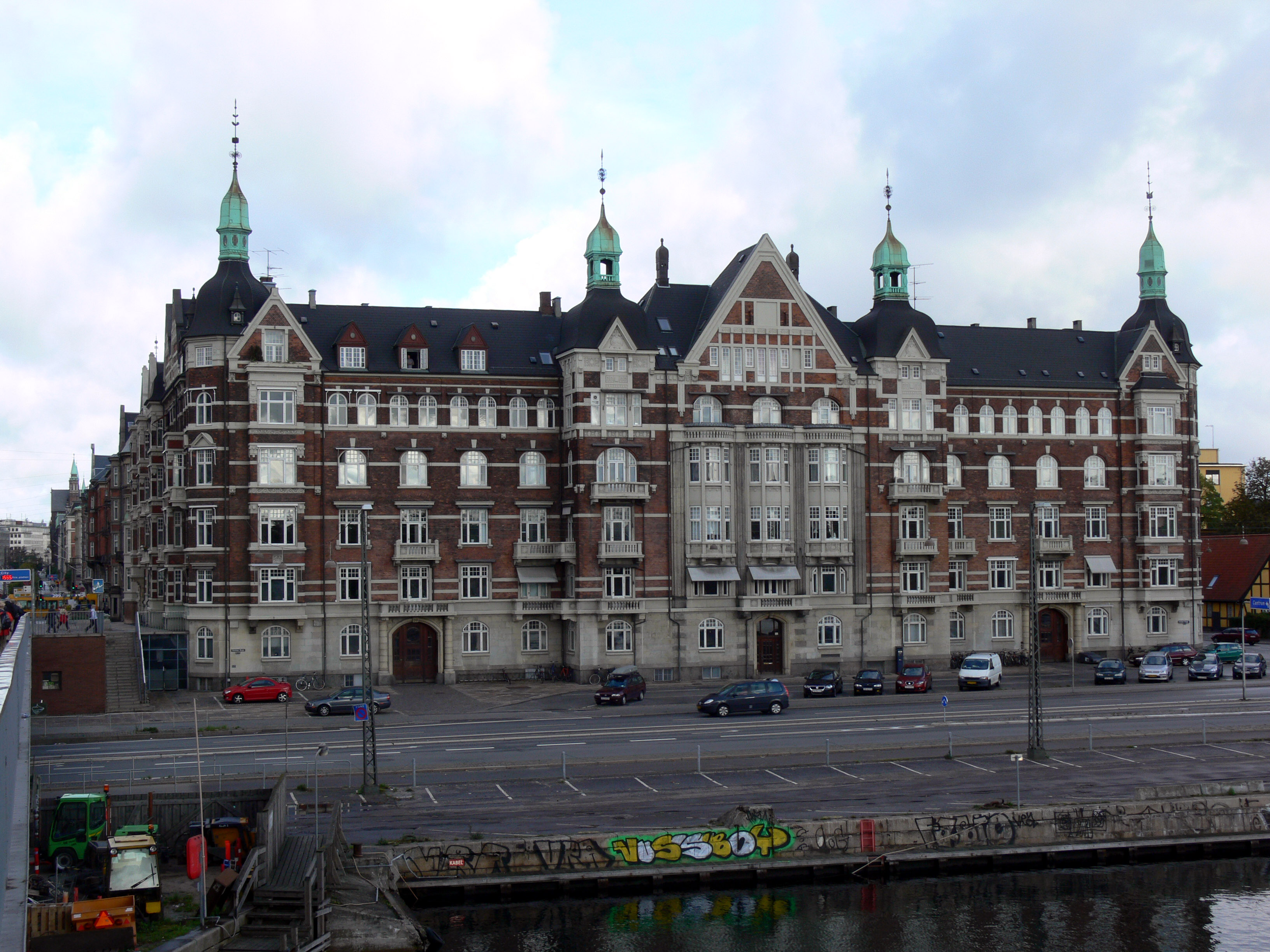
Ny Christiansborg, Copenhagen, 1906

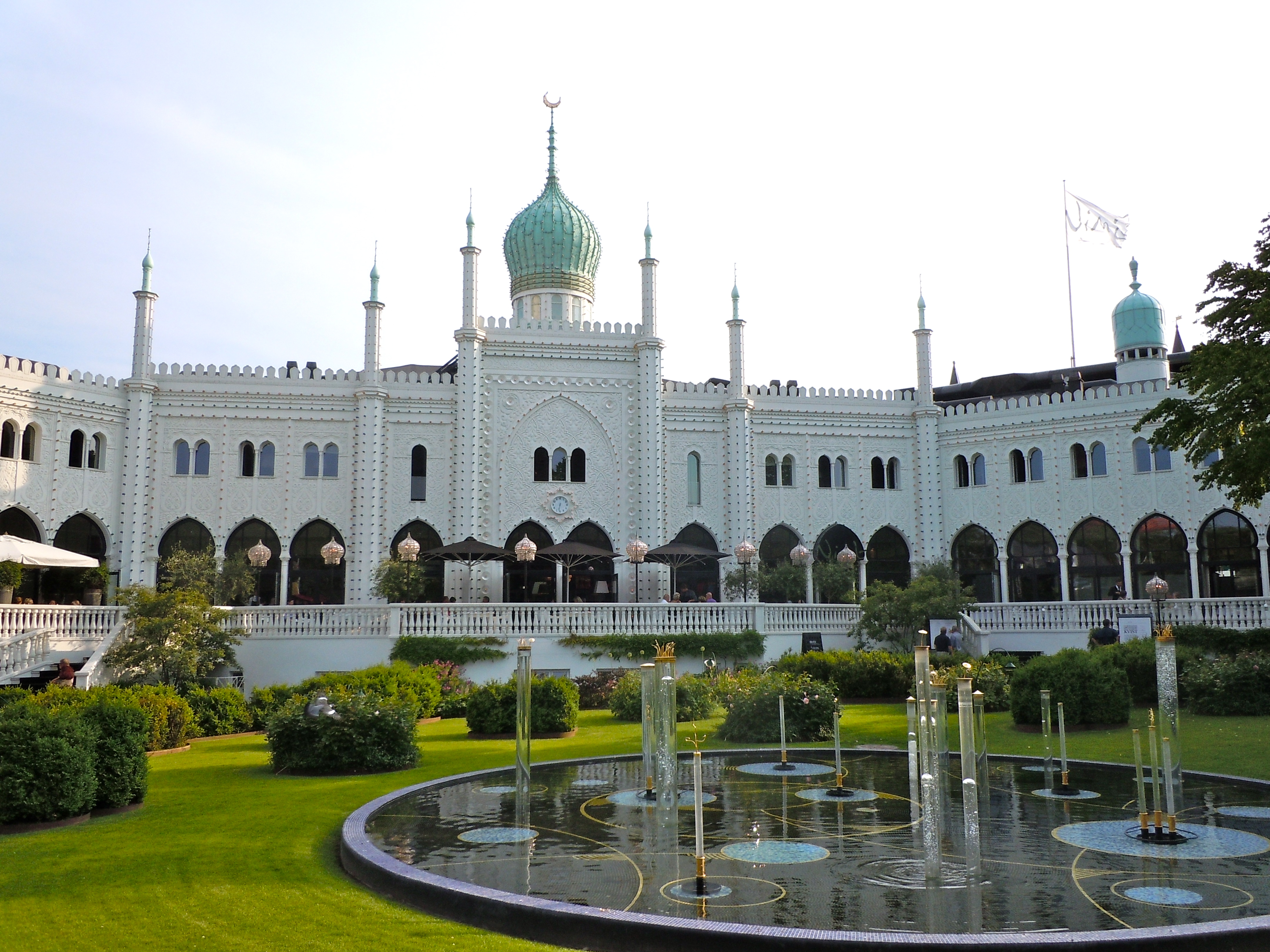
Nimb complex, Tivoli Gardens, 1909
