= List of churches in Copenhagen =

This list of churches in Copenhagen lists church buildings in Copenhagen and Frederiksberg, Denmark.

== Indre By ==
Name	Denomination	Year	Coordinates	Image	Refs
Alexander Nevsky Church	Russian Orthodox	1866	55°41′7.01″N 12°35′26.92″E		
Christian's Church	Church of Denmark	1758	55°40′20.5″N 12°35′14″E		
Church of Holmen	Church of Denmark	1619	55°40′36″N 12°35′00″E		
Church of the Holy Ghost	Church of Denmark	15th century	56°40′44.4″N 12°34′36.84″E		
Church of Our Lady	Church of Denmark	1829	55°40′46″N 12°34′27″E		
Church of Our Saviour	Church of Denmark	1695	55°40′22″N 12°35′38″E		
Frederick's Church	Church of Denmark	1894	55°41′06″N 12°35′22″E		
Garrison Church	Church of Denmark	1706	55°40′54.48″N 12°35′21.84″E		
Jerusalem Church	Methodist	1866	55°41′19.87″N 12°15′1.94″E		
Reformed Church	Reformed	1689	55°41′1.57″N 12°34′30.38″E		
St. Alban's Church	Church of England	1887	56°41′21″N 12°35′49″E		
St. Ansgar's Cathedral	Roman Catholic	1840	55°41′10″N 12°35′33″E		
St. Paul's Church	Church of Denmark	1877	55°41′15″N 12°35′15″E		
St. Peter's Church	Church of Denmark	15th century	55°40′48.2″N 12°34′14.8″E		
Trinitatis Church	Church of Denmark	1642	55°40′53.7″N 12°34′34.1″E		

== Amager ==
Name	Denomination	Year	Coordinates	Image	Refs
All Saints' Church	Church of Denmark	1932	55°39′44.5″N 12°36′56″E		
Dragør Church	Church of Denmark	1885	55°35′38″N 12°40′6.5″E		
Hans Tausen's Church	Church of Denmark	1924	55°39′53.13″N 12°34′36.06″E		
Højdevang Church	Church of Denmark	1885	55°35′38″N 12°40′6.5″E		
Nathanael's Church	Church of Denmark	1935	55°38′52.2″N 12°36′18.39″E		
Philip's Church	Church of Denmark	1924	55°39′20″N 12°37′04″E		
St. Anne's Church	Roman Catholic	1938	55°39′18″N 12°36′33″E		
Simon Peter's Church	Church of Denmark	1944	55°38′49.58″N 12°37′25.95″E		
Solvang Church	Church of Denmark	1976	55°38′55.8″N 12°35′41.6″E		
Sundby Church	Church of Denmark	1870	55°39′39″N 12°36′19″E		

== Bispebjerg ==
Name	Denomination	Year	Coordinates	Image	Refs
Grundtvig's Church	Church of Denmark	1921	55°42′59.7″N 12°32′1″E		
Emsdrupkerk	Church of Denmark	1961	55°43′41″N 12°31′13″E		

== Brønshøj ==
Name	Denomination	Year	Coordinates	Image	Refs
Brønshøj Church	Church of Denmark	1180s	55°42′20.89″N 12°20′54.6″E		

== Frederiksberg ==
Name	Denomination	Year	Coordinates	Image	Refs
Church of the Deaf	Church of Denmark	1904	55°11′12.2″N 12°32′32.8″E		
Frederiksberg Church	Church of Denmark	1734	55°40′27.4″N 12°31′58″E		
Godthaab Church	Church of Denmark	1909	55°41′01.5″N 12°31′58″E		
Immanuel Church	Church of Denmark	1905	55°40′35.9″N 12°33′04″E		
Mariendal Church	Church of Denmark	1908	55°41′31.1″N 12°32′4.4″E		
Martin's Church	Evangelical Lutheran Free Church	1908	55°40′47.64″N 12°33′20.34″E		
Solbjerg Church	Church of Denmark	1908	55°40′47.8″N 12°31′44″E		
St. Luke's Church	Church of Denmark	1897	55°40′56.3″N 12°32′11″E		
St. Mark's Church	Church of Denmark	1902	55°40′47.6″N 12°33′9.5″E		
St. Thomas' Church	Church of Denmark	1898	55°41′3.6″N 12°32′30″E		

== Nørrebro ==
Name	Denomination	Year	Coordinates	Image	Refs
Anna Church	Church of Denmark	1914	55°41′34.8″N 12°32′38.9″E		
Bethlehem Church	Church of Denmark	1937	55°40′59.3″N 12°33′24.7″E		
Brorson's Church	Church of Denmark	1901	55°41′15.01″N 12°32′46″E		
St. John's Church	Church of Denmark	1861	55°41′31″N 12°33′43″E		
Kingos Church	International		55°42'03.7"N 12°32'43.5"E		

== Østerbro ==
Name	Denomination	Year	Coordinates	Image	Refs
Church of the Free Port	Church of Denmark	1905	55°41′56″N 12°35′19″E		
Church of Sweden in Copenhagen	Church of Sweden	1911	55°41′32″N 12°35′24″E		
Isaiah Church	Church of Denmark	1912	55°41′32.51″N 12°34′42″E		
Kildevæld Church	Church of Denmark	1932	55°42′49.8″N 12°34′03″E		
St. Augustine's Church	Roman Catholic	1914	55°42′26.5″N 12°34′01.4″E		
St. James' Church	Church of Denmark	1878	55°42′12.6″N 12°34′35″E		
Zion's Church	Church of Denmark	1896	55°42′40.7″N 12°34′41″E		

== Valby ==
Name	Denomination	Year	Coordinates	Image	Refs
Jesus Church	Church of Denmark	1895	55°39′55″N 12°31′19.5″E		

== Vesterbro/Kongens Enghave ==
Name	Denomination	Year	Coordinates	Image	Refs
Absalon's Church	Defunct	1934	55°39′55.4″N 12°33′01″E		
Apostle Church	Church of Denmark	1901	55°40′18.8″N 12°33′04″E		
Church of Christ	Church of Denmark	1900	55°40′04″N 12°32′42.3″E		
Church of Jesus' Heart	Roman Catholic	1895	55°40′24″N 12°33′26″E		
St. Matthew's Church	Church of Denmark	1879	55°40′10″N 12°32′53″E		
St. Mary's Church	Church of Denmark				

== See also ==
- Listed buildings in Copenhagen Municipality
