= Philip's Church, Copenhagen =

Coordinates: 55°39′20″N 12°37′04″E

Philip's Church
- The Parish Church of St Philip the Apostle
- Filips kirke
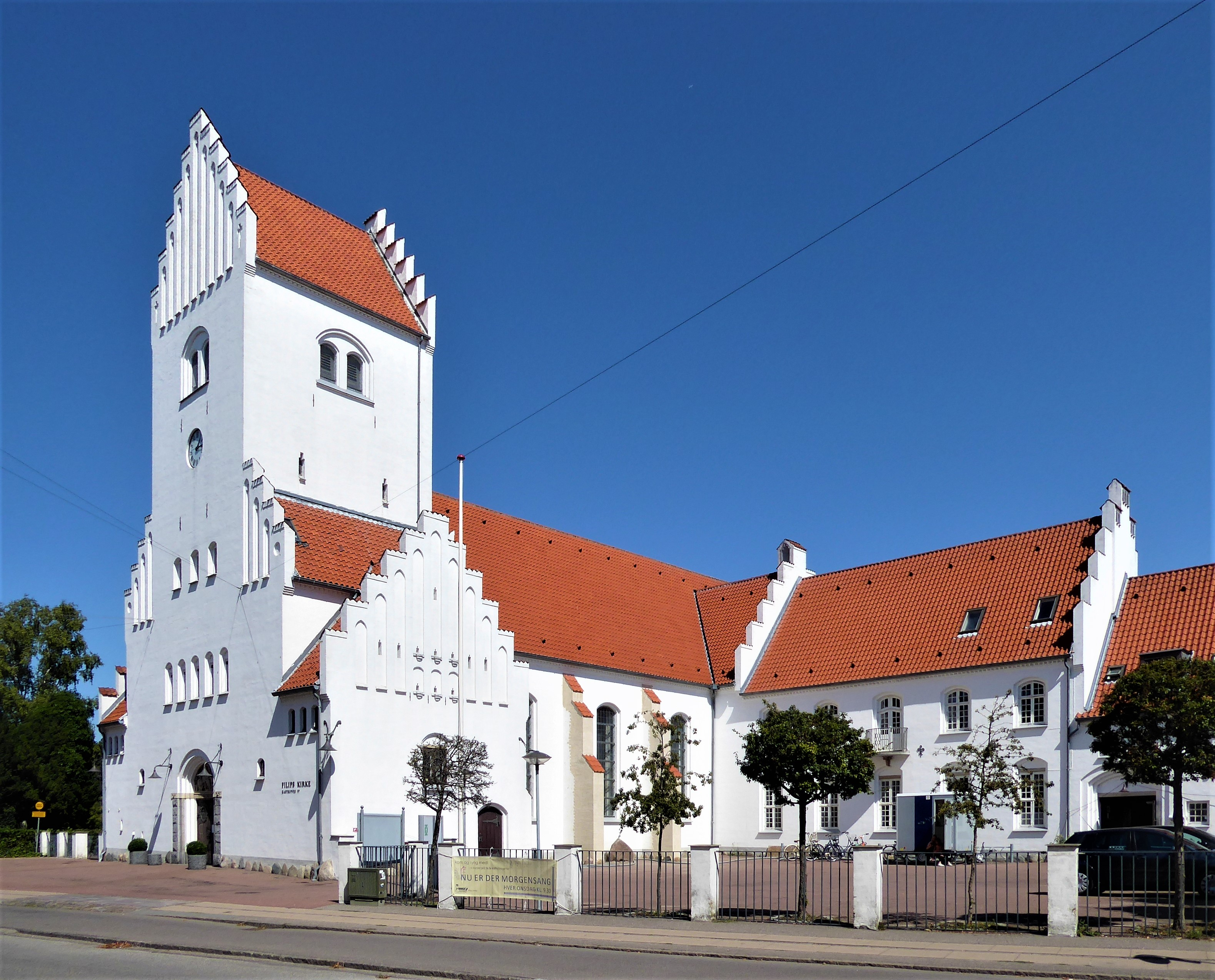
- Philip's Church
- Location: Copenhagen
- Country: Denmark
- Denomination: Church of Denmark
- Website: Church website

History
- Status: Active
- Dedication: Saint Philip
- Events: 19 October 1907 (Parish was created)

Architecture
- Functional status: Parish Church
- Architect: Rasmus Rue
- Completed: 1924

Administration
- Diocese: Copenhagen
- Deanery: Amagerbro
- Parish: Filips

Clergy
- Bishop: Peter Skov-Jakobsen
- Dean: Michael Krogstrup Nissen
- Pastor: Bo Heikendorf Petersen

Philip's Church (Danish: Filips Kirke) is a Church of Denmark parish church on Amager in Copenhagen, Denmark.

== History ==
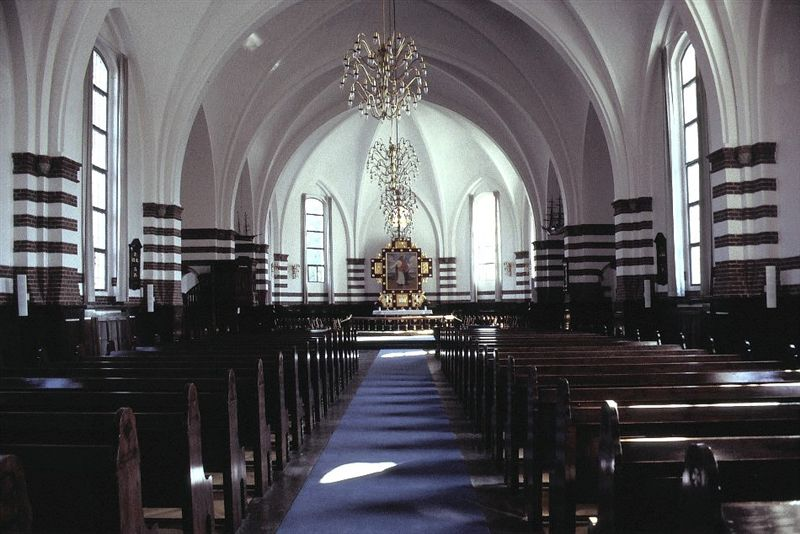
The church interior in 2007

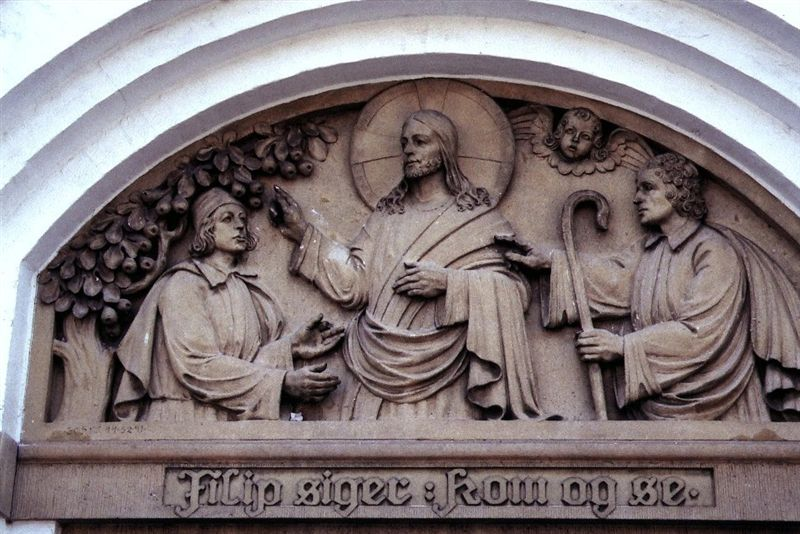
Tympanon relief over west portals

The first Philip's Church was a wooden structure built in connection with the establishment of Philip's Parish which was disjoined from the Parish of Sundby on 19 October 1907. It was replaced by the current church which was completed in 1924 to a design by Danish architect Rasmus Vilhelm Rasmussen Rue (1863-1944). The congregation house (menighedshuset), which is attached to the church, was added in 1928.

== Architecture ==
The church is built in a traditional style inspired by Danish village churches.

== Interior ==
The altarpiece is a painting in a gilt carved frame by Danish artist Erik Jensen (1883-1974). The pulpit has gospel reliefs by M. Sørensen. Above the west entrance is a tympanon relief designed by Johan Rudolf Carl Nielsen (1863-1952). The inscription quoting the words of Philip the Apostle to Nathanael in John 1:45: "Come and see".

== Cultural references ==
In the fifth episode of the DR television series Huset på Christianshavn, Der bydes til bryllup (1970), Karla (Kirsten Walter) and Egon (Willy Rathnov) are married in the church.
