= St. Augustine's Church, Copenhagen =

St. Augustine's Church
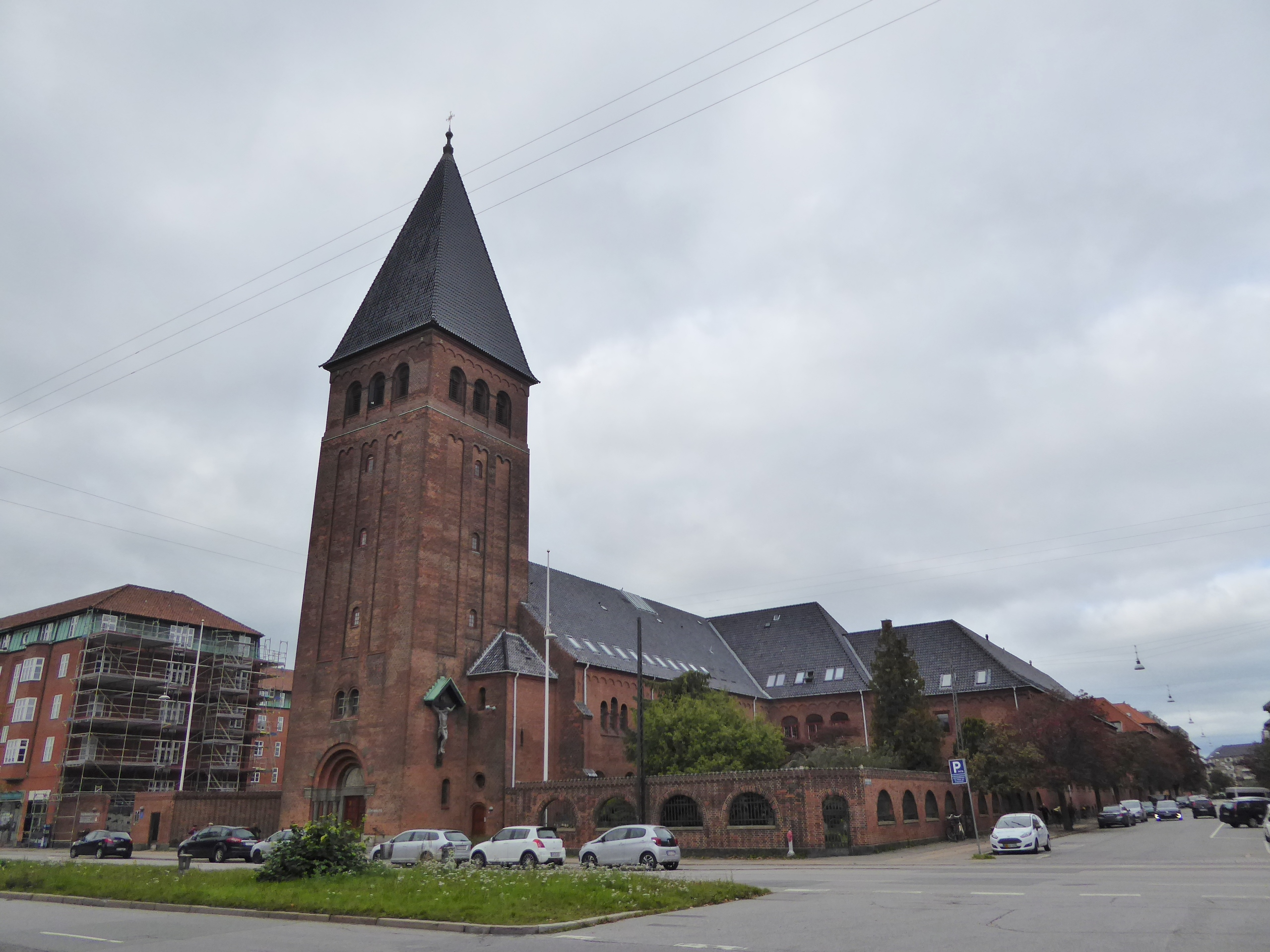
- St. Augustine's Church seen from Jagtvej
- St. Augustine's Church
- 55°42′26.5″N 12°34′01.4″E
- Location: Copenhagen
- Country: Denmark
- Denomination: Roman Catholic

History
- Status: Church
- Founded: 1914
- Dedication: Saint Anne

Architecture
- Functional status: Active
- Architect: Emil Jørgensen
- Style: National Romantic

Administration
- Diocese: Copenhagen

St. Augustine's Church is a Roman-Catholic church on Jagtvej in the Østerbro district of Copenhagen, Denmark. A former convent, which was built in association with the church, now houses Niels Steensens Gymnasium, a Catholic upper secondary school, and a hall of residence.

== History ==
The convent was founded by Augustinian nuns from Innsbruck, Austria. The complex was completed in 1914 to a design by Emil Jørgensen, who had already designed the Roman-Catholic St. Anne's Church and St. Elisabeth's Hospital on Amager.

The Sisters used the building until 1942 when they moved to a more peaceful setting on Åsebakken in Høsterkøb. Prior to that, they had switched to the Order of Saint Benedict. Niels Steensens Gymnasium took over the buildings in 1954. It had previously been founded in 1950 at St Knud's School on Stenosgade.
