= Albert Nicolai Schioldann =

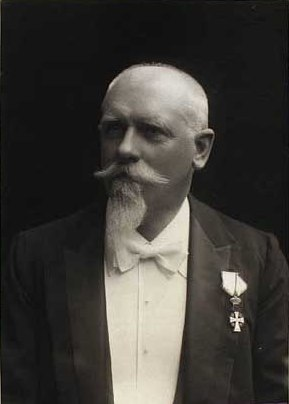
- Born: 21 January 1843; Copenhagen, Denmark
- Died: 23 February 1917 (aged 74); Copenhagen, Denmark
- Occupations: Master mason and developer
- Awards: Knight of the Dannebrog

Albert Nicolai Schioldann (21 January 1843 - 23 February 1917) was a Danish master mason, developer and philanthropist.

== Early life and education ==
Schioldann was born on 21 January 1843 in Copenhagen, the son of architect and master mason J.N. Schioldann and wife née Christensen. He followed in his father's footsteps, apprenticing as a mason.

== Career ==
Schioldann ran a successful business as a master mason and developer. He was also active as an architect. He has for instance designed Theodor Neubert's Villa Bell Mare at Strandvejen 255 in Skovshoved (1889).

In 1881–83, he constructed the high-end apartment building Holckenhus in the city centre. In 1885, he constructed the equally imposing building at Gammel Kongevej 136-138.

He was a freemason and served as inspector at Kronprins Frederiks og Kronprinsesse Louises Stiftelse,

== Personal life ==
Schioldann was married to Frederikke Christiane née Meyer. They lived in the Holckenhus building in 1895. Their apartment was the first-floor apartment at Bester Boulevard No. 4 (now G. C. Andersens Boulevard).

== Philanthropy ==
=== Artist stidios ===
In Holckenhus and Gammel Kongevej 135–138, Schioldann made room for artist studios on the top floor.

=== Schioldanns Stiftelse ===
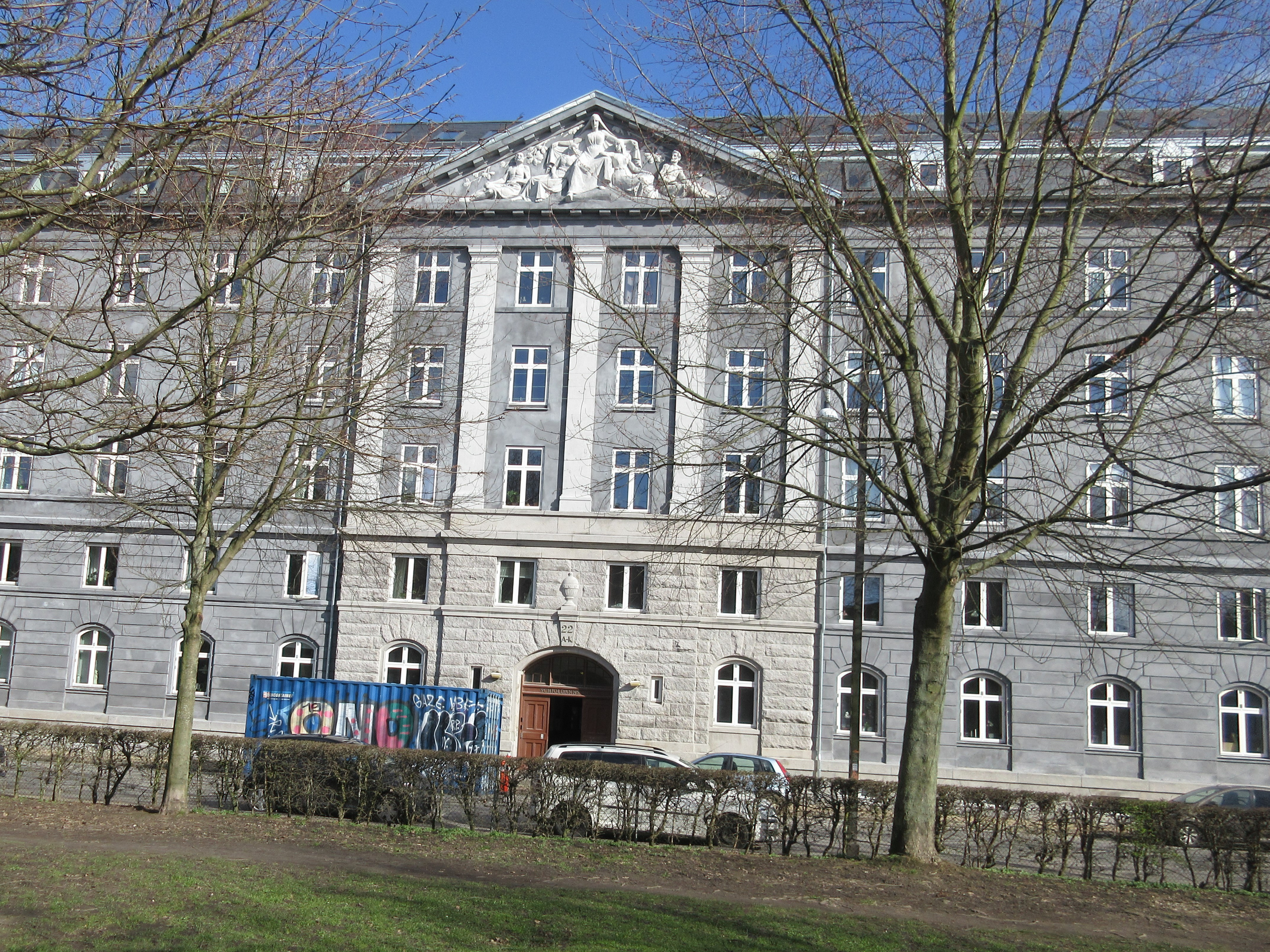
Schioldanns Stiftelse at Hørsholmgade 22 in Copenhagen

Schioldann founded Schioldanns Stiftelse at Hørsholmsgade 22 in Nørrebro. The five-storey building was completed in 1902 to designs by the architect Emil Jørgensen and provided free accommodation for families and individuals in difficult circumstances. Schioldann was chairman of the board until his death.

=== Work for deaf people ===
Schioldann, who had a deaf son, Ove Schioldann, was very active in the work for improving the living conditions for the deaf. He was a board member of Døvstummeforeningen af 1866 and Arbejdshjemmet for døvstumme Piger. He constructed the Church of the Deaf and was also here a board member.

Døvstummeforeningen af 1866 made him an honorary member in 1906.

== Honours ==
Schioldann was awarded the title Justitsråd and created a Knight in the Order of the Dannebrog. The street Schioldannsvej in Charlottenlund is named after him.
