= Kildevæld Church =

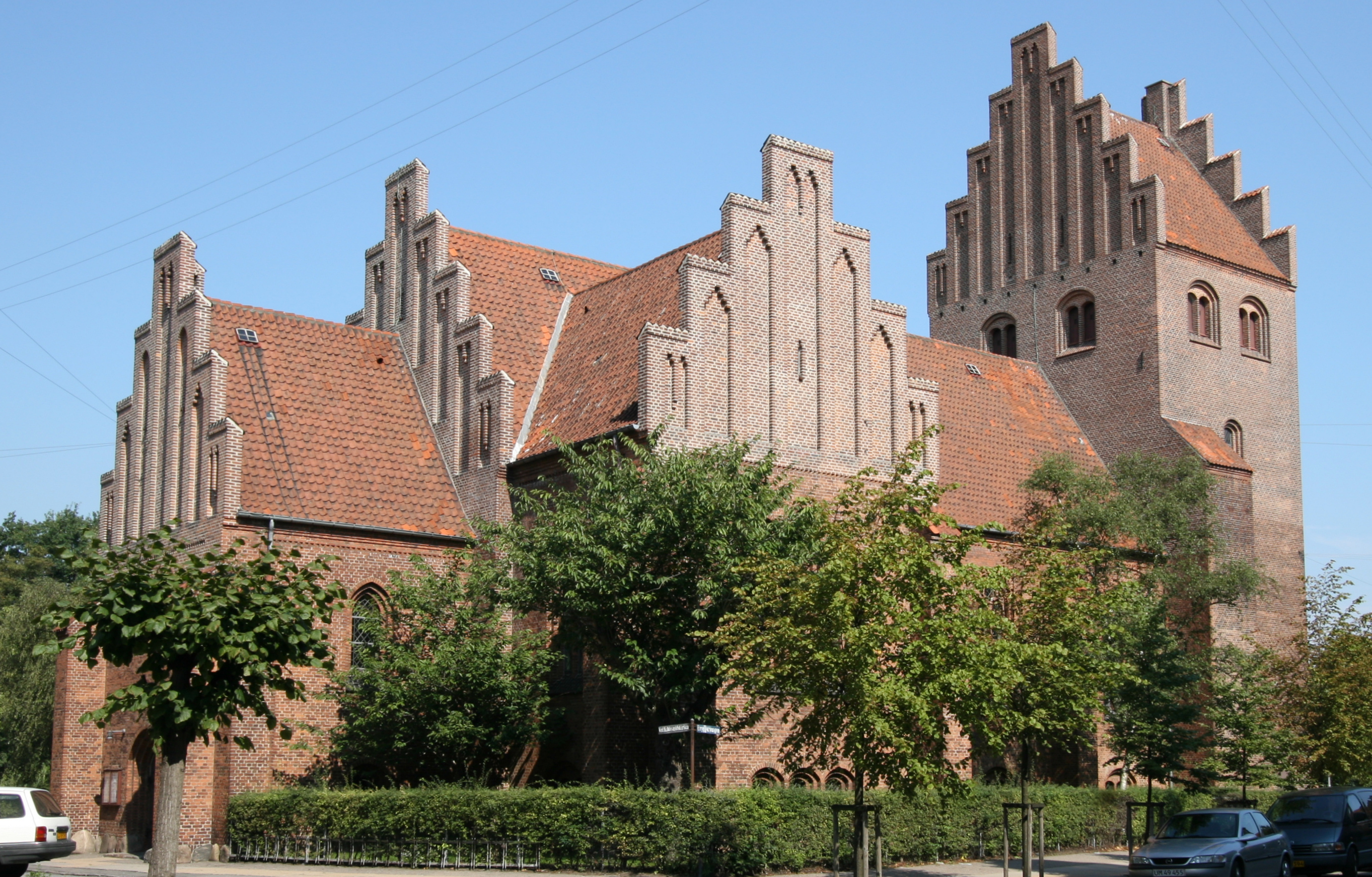
- Kildevæld Church
- Kildevæld Church
- 55°42′49.8″N 12°34′03″E
- Location: Østerbro, Copenhagen
- Country: Denmark
- Denomination: Church of Denmark

History
- Status: Church

Architecture
- Architect: Paul Staffeldt Matthiesen
- Architectural type: Church
- Completed: 1932

Specifications
- Materials: Brick

Administration
- Archdiocese: Diocese of Copenhagen

Kildevæld Church (Danish: Kildevældskirken) is a Lutheran church in the Østerbro district of Copenhagen, Denmark. It belongs to the church of Denmark. Completed in 1932, it is one of many churches in Copenhagen which was built by the Church Foundation.

== History ==
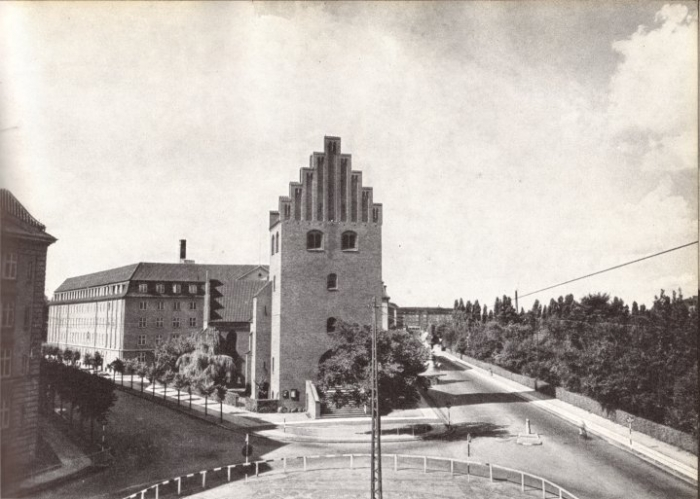
The church viewed from the east in 1949

In the beginning of the 1920s, Zion's Parish had developed into the second most populous parish in Copenhagen. A committee was therefore set up and the Copenhagen Church Foundation was Church Foundation undertook the task to raise the necessary funds. A competition for the design of the new church was won by Paul Staffeldt Matthiesen who later also designed several more churches for the Church Foundation, including Højdevang Church and Simon Peter's Church on Amager. The foundation stone was set on 29 January 29 January 1930 and the church was consecrated on 2 October 1932.

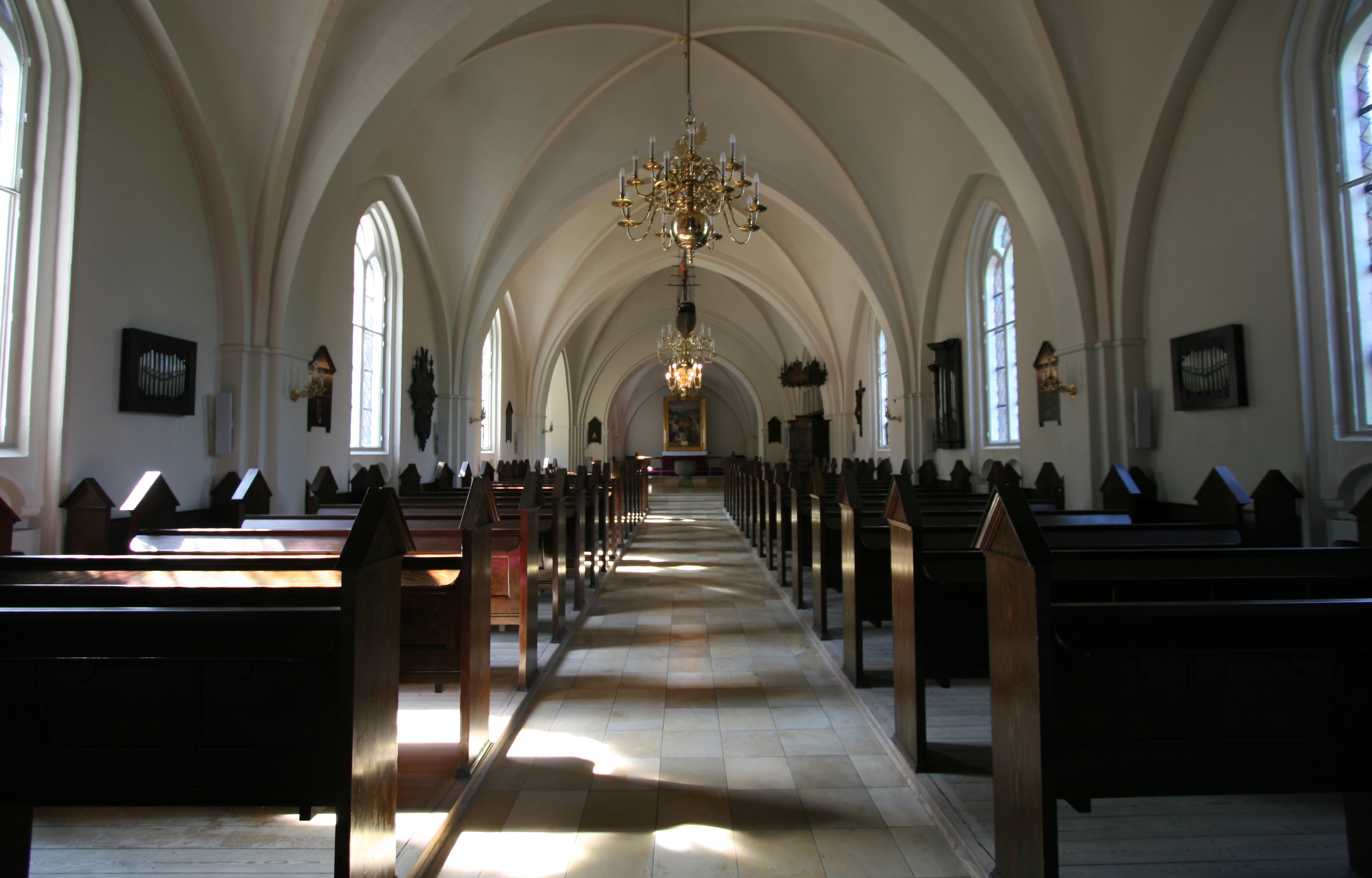
Interior

== Architecture ==
The church is designed in a Neo-Gothic style which draws on inspiration both from medieval Danish abbey churches and village churches of provincial Zealand. The nostalgic style was in stark contrast to the Modernism which otherwise dominated Danish architecture at the time. The cross-vaulted interior is white-washed. The crypt has a separate entrance and is used for social activities among members of the parish.

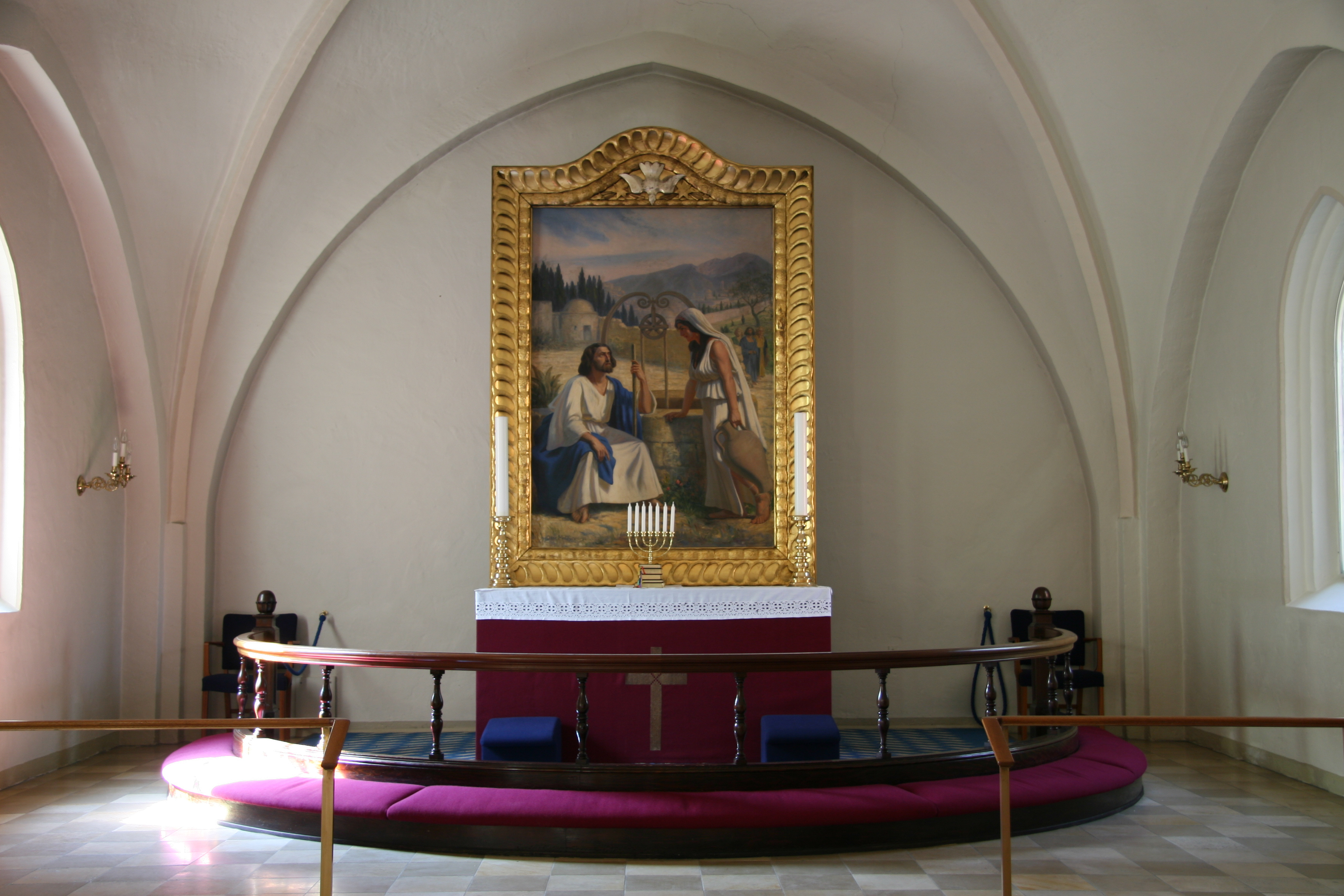
Altar1949

== Furnishings ==
The altarpiece was painted by Oscar Matthiesen, the architect's father, who has also painted the Constituent Assembly in Rigsdagen's assembly hall in Christiansborg. It depicts Jesus With a Samaritan Woman (John ev. IV, 1-42). The pulpit is carved in wood and shows three scenes from the Acts of the Apostles. On the wall next to the pulpit is a copy of Jens Adolf Jerichau's crucifix which is also found in St. Paul's Church at Nyboder and outside Jesus Church in Valby as well as in many village churches. The original is carved in marble and found in the Ny Carlsberg Glyptotek.
