= Solvang (disambiguation) =

Solvang may refer to:

== People ==
- Arvid Solvang, a Norwegian songwriter/producer living in Oslo, Norway
- Helge Solvang, a Norwegian war sailor and politician
- Henning Solvang, a Norwegian rock musician and member of the rock bands Thulsa Doom and Brut Boogaloo
- Ib Solvang Hansen, a Danish professional wrestler, known by his ring name Eric the Red
- Julie Meyer Solvang, a Norwegian former professional racing cyclist
- Svein Egil Solvang, a Norwegian sprint canoer who competed in the late 1980s

== Places ==
- Solvang, California, a city in Santa Barbara County, California, United States
- Solvang Church, a church in the Amager district of Copenhagen, Denmark
- Solvang, Vestfold, a village in Færder municipality in Vestfold county, Norway

== Other ==
- Solvang (company), a Norwegian shipping company, based in the city of Stavanger, Norway
- Solvang Formation, a geologic formation in Norway
