= Højdevang Church =

Coordinates: 55.6478°N 12.6051°E

- Hoejdevangskirken
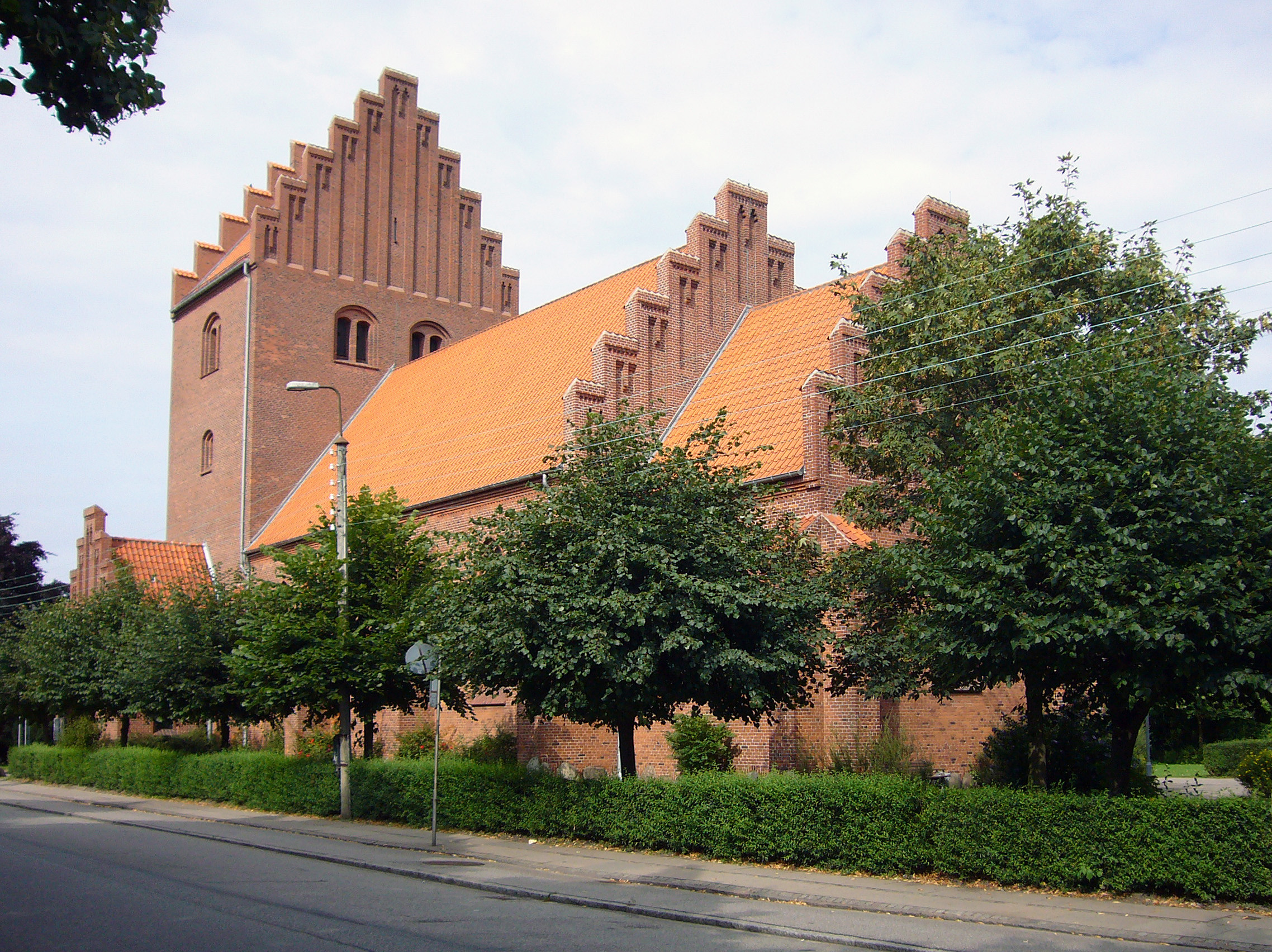
- Højdevang Church
- Location: Copenhagen
- Country: Denmark
- Denomination: Church of Denmark
- Website: Church website

History
- Status: Active
- Consecrated: 14 April 1935

Architecture
- Functional status: Parish Church
- Architect: Poul Staffeldt Mathiesen (1891–1979) .
- Completed: 1935

Specifications
- Capacity: 220 people
- Length: 34 m (111 ft 7 in)
- Width: 11 m (36 ft 1 in)

Administration
- Diocese: Copenhagen
- Deanery: Amagerbro
- Parish: Højdevangs

Clergy
- Bishop: Peter Skov-Jakobsen
- Vicar: Line Blak Gundersen
- Dean: Michael Krogstrup Nissen
- Pastor(s): Jesper Yde; Ann-Luise Bjørnebo

Højdevang Church (Højdevangskirken) is a church in the Amager area of Copenhagen, Denmark.

The church was consecrated on 14 April 1935. It was built on the basis of designs by architect Poul Staffeldt Mathiesen (1891–1979) . Unlike most churches, Højdevang Church faces south rather than east. This was due to the fact that the church plan was designed in perpendicular to the size of the land, which was longer from north to south rather than from west to east.

== Other Sources ==
- "Højdevangskirken - Kort til Kirken". korttilkirken.dk.
