= Church of the Deaf =

Coordinates: 55.6867°N 12.5424°E

- De Døves Kirke
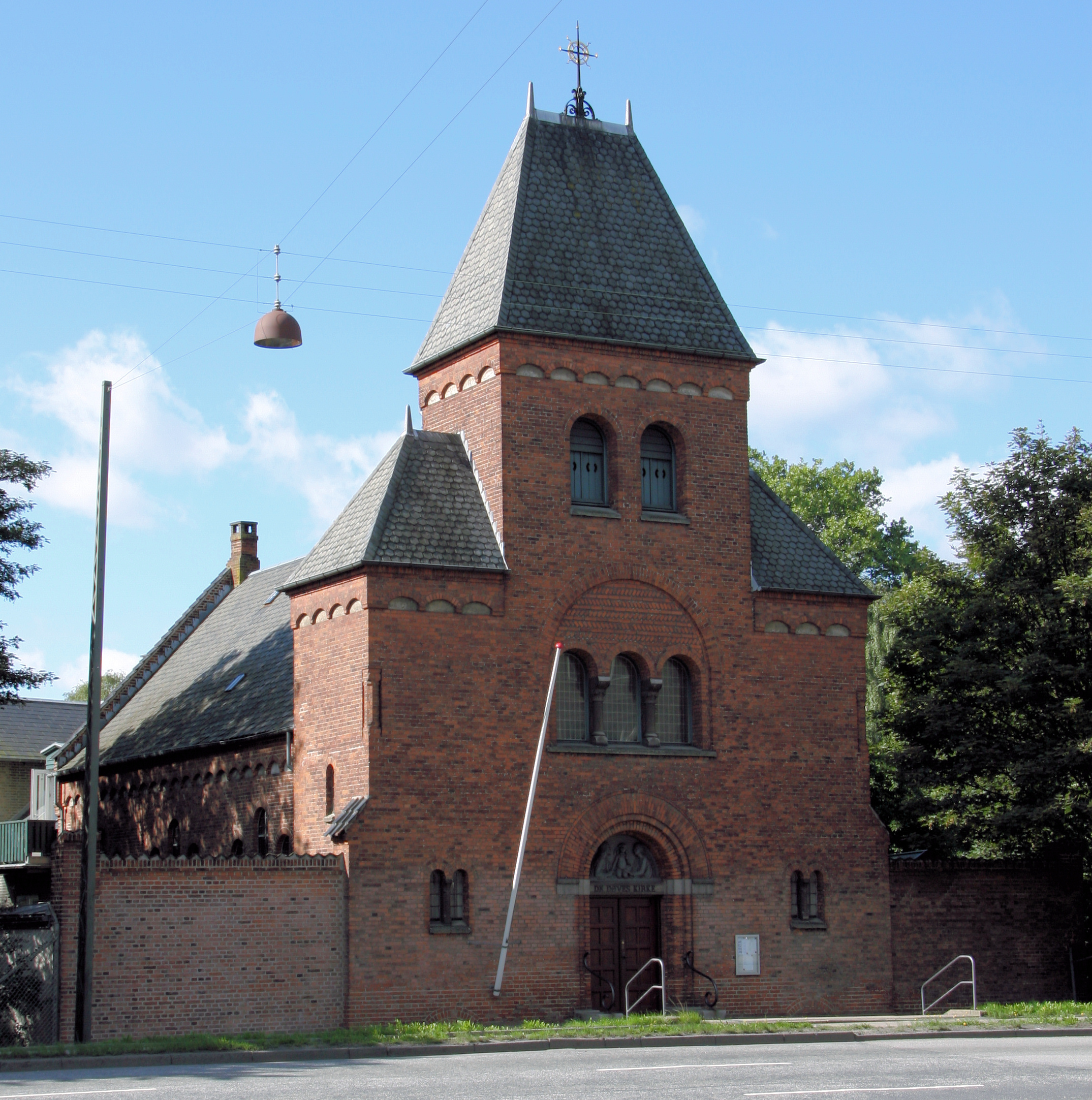
- Church of the Deaf
- Location: Copenhagen
- Country: Denmark
- Denomination: Church of Denmark
- Website: Church website

History
- Status: Active
- Founded: 12 November 1900
- Founder: Johannes Jørgensen
- Consecrated: 18 December 1904

Architecture
- Architectural type: Neo-Romanesque
- Years built: 1904

Administration
- Diocese: Copenhagen
- Parish: St Thomas

Clergy
- Bishop: Peter Skov-Jakobsen

The Church of the Deaf or Deaf People's Church (Døves Kirke) is a church in Copenhagen, Denmark, on Falkonergårdsvej in the Frederiksberg Municipality.

== History ==
On December 1, 1900, Johannes Jørgensen, the first deaf priest in Denmark, established the first deaf congregation in Europe. The Church of the Deaf was founded on November 12, 1900, in Copenhagen. The church was built on designs by the architect Emil Jørgensen in the National Romantic style. It was constructed by master builder Albert Nicolai Schioldann. Schioldann, who had a deaf son, was very active in Copenhagen's deaf community and would later serve on the board of the church.

The church was completed in 1904 and consecrated on December 18, 1904. The church was built on the initiative of the Association of Effata, the Workers' Home for Deaf-Dumb Women and the Deaf Society of 1866.

In 1934 services was celebrated using the Danish language. There were two worship services held on Sundays, one using the sign language and the other in spoken language. In 2000, the congregations celebrated their 100th anniversary and, for the first time, published a translation of Hebrew and Greek texts from the Bible into Danish sign language. In 2001, a new church house was inaugurated. On February 3, 2013, the Sign language Bible was inaugurated during a service attended by Queen Margrethe II of Denmark. On May 14, 2014, the Danish sign language was recognized as a language, an occasion which was commemorated that same evening during a service.
