= Dorthe Emilie Røssell =

Danish author, member of WWII resistance

- Born: Dorthe Emilie Christiansen; 12 January 1934 (age 92)
- Occupation: Author
- Children: One son
- Writing career
- Language: Danish
- Period: 2007-

Dorthe Emilie Røssell (born 12 January 1934, née Christiansen) is a Danish author who, as a child, was a member of the Danish resistance during the Second World War. Her parents were members of the Studenternes Efterretningstjeneste and Røssell helped them, infiltrating German arms warehouses, carrying messages and transporting weapons and propaganda. Her parents were arrested by the Gestapo on Christmas Eve 1944. Røssell's father was tortured in Røssell's presence to try to get him to betray the resistance and was afterwards sent to Neuengamme concentration camp. He survived the war. Røssell's parents made her promise never to speak of her actions during the war, a promise she kept until 2007 when, prompted by an account of her father in another work, she released a memoir entitled Jeg brød et løfte (I Broke a Promise). She has since written a number of other works.

== Second World War ==
Røssell was born on 12 January 1934. She is the daughter of Georg and Asta Christiansen and was nicknamed Dunte as a child. After the April 1940 German invasion of Denmark her parents joined the Danish resistance movement as members of the student-based Studenternes Efterretningstjeneste. The family's apartment in Østerbro, Copenhagen and their cottage at Hjortekær in Hovedstaden were both used as hiding places for Jews escaping the Holocaust, to store weapons and to print anti-German propaganda. Røssell helped her parents from the age of six, learning how to shoot a Luger pistol, carrying messages and transporting weapons and propaganda in her doll's pram. One of her first roles with the resistance was to squeeze through small gaps to enter German arms warehouses.

The family were twice raided by the Gestapo, once by mistake, once to arrest Georg, whom Røssell helped to escape over the rooftops. On Christmas Eve 1944, the Germans caught the Røssells in a raid on their cottage. The family had been hosting a gathering of resistance members, which had been betrayed by one of their party who had been captured and tortured. The Danish Gestapo chief Ib Birkedal Hansen was present on the raid and, when Røssell asked him when her father would return from arrest told her "If he has not come home within an hour, I have put him up against a wall and shot him".

With both her parents arrested Røssell was placed with an aunt and uncle, who were known to have traded with the Germans. Her father was tortured by the Gestapo at their Shellhus headquarters in Copenhagen. As part of the interrogation Røssell was taken to the building and interrogated. Hansen told her "Now you tell me what you know, otherwise I'll shoot you while your father watches and him afterwards, or I'll shoot your father while you watch and you afterwards!". Having refused to talk her father was brought in and hit with a sjambok, while Røssell was forced to watch. After seven hours she was released onto the streets of Copenhagen.

Unwilling to return to her aunt and uncle she sought refuge with Karl Erik, a resistance fighter and fireman. With Erik she returned to the cottage and, using a key she had kept hidden from her aunt and uncle, accessed the structure to retrieve weapons, ammunition and uniforms missed by the Germans. Her mother, who had attempted suicide during her imprisonment out of fear that she would betray the resistance under torture, was released several weeks later. The resistance wanted to move Røssell and her mother to neutral Sweden but they insisted on remaining in case Georg was released. They did move to a cottage in Veddinge Bakker. Georg had been interned at Neuengamme concentration camp in Northern Germany but survived and was released at the end of the war.

== Post-war ==
After his return Georg and Asta made Røssell promise never to reveal the torture she had witnessed in the Shellhus. Her parents were ill in the post-war years and Røssell cared for them while holding down a part-time job; Asta also turned to alcohol and drugs. In Spring 1948 Røssell was confirmed at the Church of the Free Port. In a meeting after the ceremony she was presented with the blue, red and white armband of the Danish resistance movement by a group of ex-fighters and also received a diploma marking her contributions. Georg testified at the May 1948 trial of Hansen, giving details of the torture he had endured. Hansen was convicted and executed for his crimes. Røssell's parents divorced in 1952.

Røssell later married and had one son. She was with her husband for 44 years; he also suffered from ill health due to a heart condition and Røssell helped to care for him. Røssell's father died in 1989 and her mother in 1993. Asta suffered from ill health in her final years, which were spent in Bernadottegården, a care home for elderly resistance fighters. Even after the deaths of her parents Røssell maintained her silence about the war years, not even telling her husband.

== Writing ==
=== I Broke a Promise ===
In 2007, Røssell made her writing debut with Jeg brød et løfte (I Broke a Promise), a memoir of her childhood including the war. She had been inspired to write her memoir after reading a 2004 book by Peter Øvig Knudsen which mentioned her father's resistance activities. Røssell said that she found writing the work alleviated her insomnia and high blood pressure. She has since given talks about her life to schoolchildren.

=== Other works ===
Røssell has since written:

- Eftertid
- Rumle og Drille på eventyr
- Mellem os sagt
- Om et øjeblik
- Et strejf af rosmarin
- Fasme - fortæl!
- Undervejs
- Lusitania
- Rumle samler på venner
- Uro i julekassen
- Gennem kløften over bjerget
