= Swedish Gustaf's Church =

Swedish Gustaf's Church Svenska Gustafskyrkan
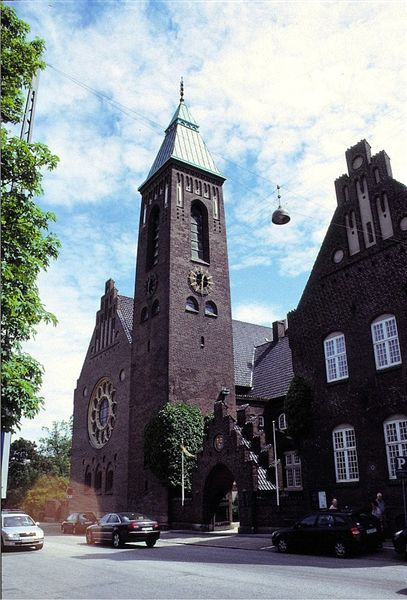
- The church seen from the street
- Swedish Gustaf's Church; Svenska Gustafskyrkan
- 55°41′32″N 12°35′24″E
- Location: 4 Folke Bernadottes Allé; Østerbro, Copenhagen
- Country: Denmark
- Denomination: Protestant

History
- Status: Church

Architecture
- Architect: Theodor Wåhlin
- Architectural type: Church
- Style: Jugendstil
- Groundbreaking: 1908
- Completed: 1911

Specifications
- Materials: Brick

Administration
- Province: Church of Sweden Abroad

Swedish Gustaf's Church (Swedish: Svenska Gustafskyrkan), part of the Church of Sweden Abroad, is the church of the Swedish congregation in Copenhagen, Denmark. It was built between 1907 and 1911 to the design of the Swedish architect Theodor Wåhlin (1864–1948) and is named after King Gustaf V of Sweden.

== History ==
The Swedish Church's activities in Copenhagen began in 1901 when Pastor Nils Widner was sent there to work among Swedish sailors. The work, however, soon embraced the many thousands of other Swedes in and around Copenhagen. Religious services were initially held in the Garrison Church on Sankt Annæ Plads, and in rented premises in Rysenstensgade there were daily gatherings in the various compounds that eventually formed.

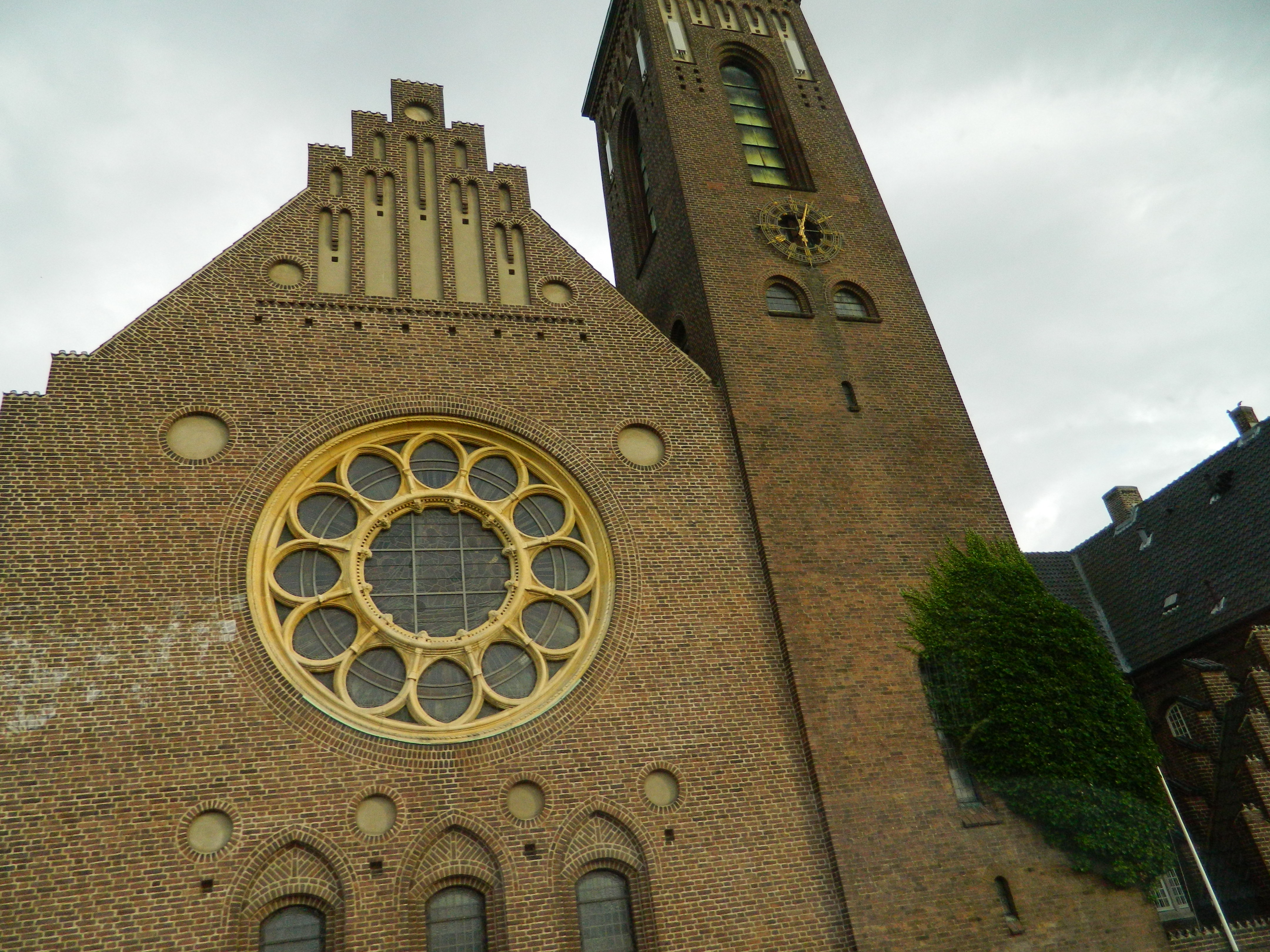
Swedish Gustaf's Church exterior

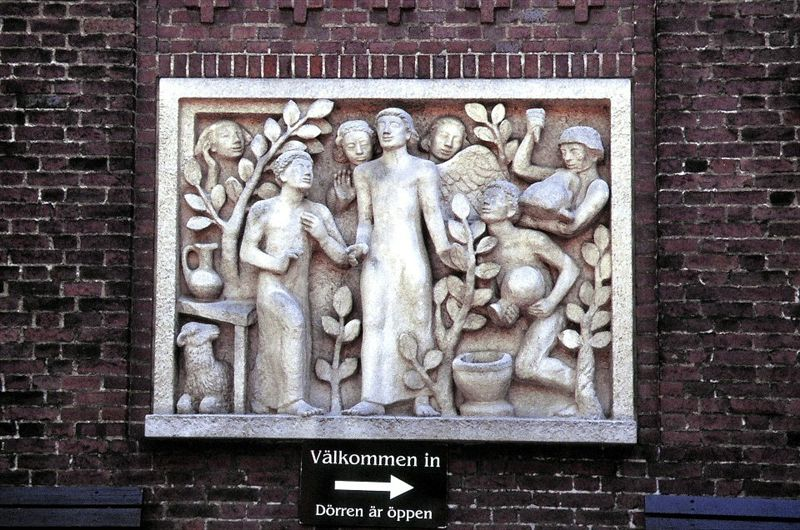
Relief by Henrik Starcke

The need for a church grew, and in 1903 the Swedish Church Society was formed which saw it as its task to realize the construction of a Swedish church in Copenhagen. Swedes who then lived in Copenhagen decided to donate 10 øre per week to finance the church building and the Swedish architect Theodor Wåhlin, resident architect at Lund Cathedral, was charged with its design.

As had been the case with St. Alban's English Church two decades earlier, a site was provided by the Danish state on the bank of the moat surrounding Kastellet, although on the opposite, north-western, corner, on the site of the former Grønlands Bastion.

The foundation stone was laid in 1908 at a ceremony attended by both the Swedish and Danish royal couples, and the new church was consecrated in 1911. The Danish architect Gotfred Tvede (1863–1947) supervised the construction, assisted by Hans Alfred Jørgen Jørgensen (1878–1923).

== Architecture ==
The church is designed in the Jugendstil style and is built in a hard-burnt brownish brick. The complex includes church halls, a community centre, offices, a rectory, staff houses, archives and storage rooms. The exterior wall contains a relief designed by the Danish artist Henrik Starcke (1899–1973).

== Furnishings ==
The current organ has 31 stops and was installed in 1947. The pulpit was created by the sculptor Niels Hansen in Copenhagen. The altar is of black granite and has the christogram IHS, usually interpreted as Iesus, Hominum Salvator – "Jesus, Savior of man".

== Gallery ==
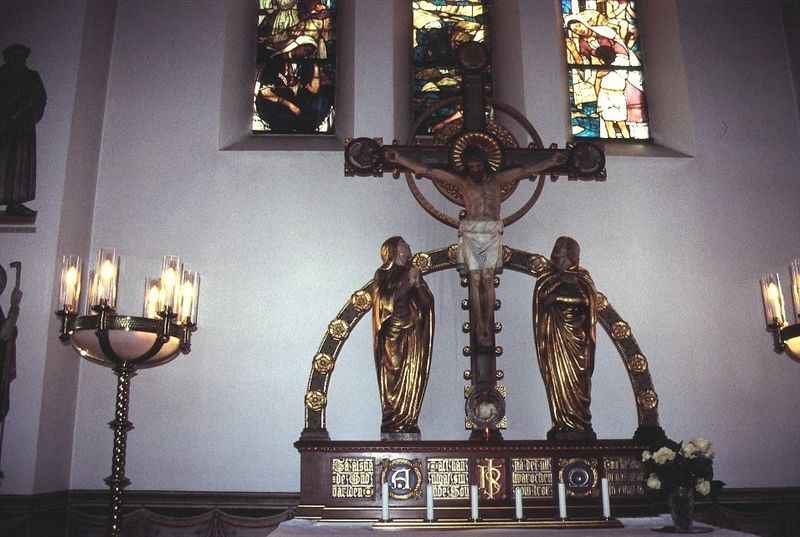
Altar

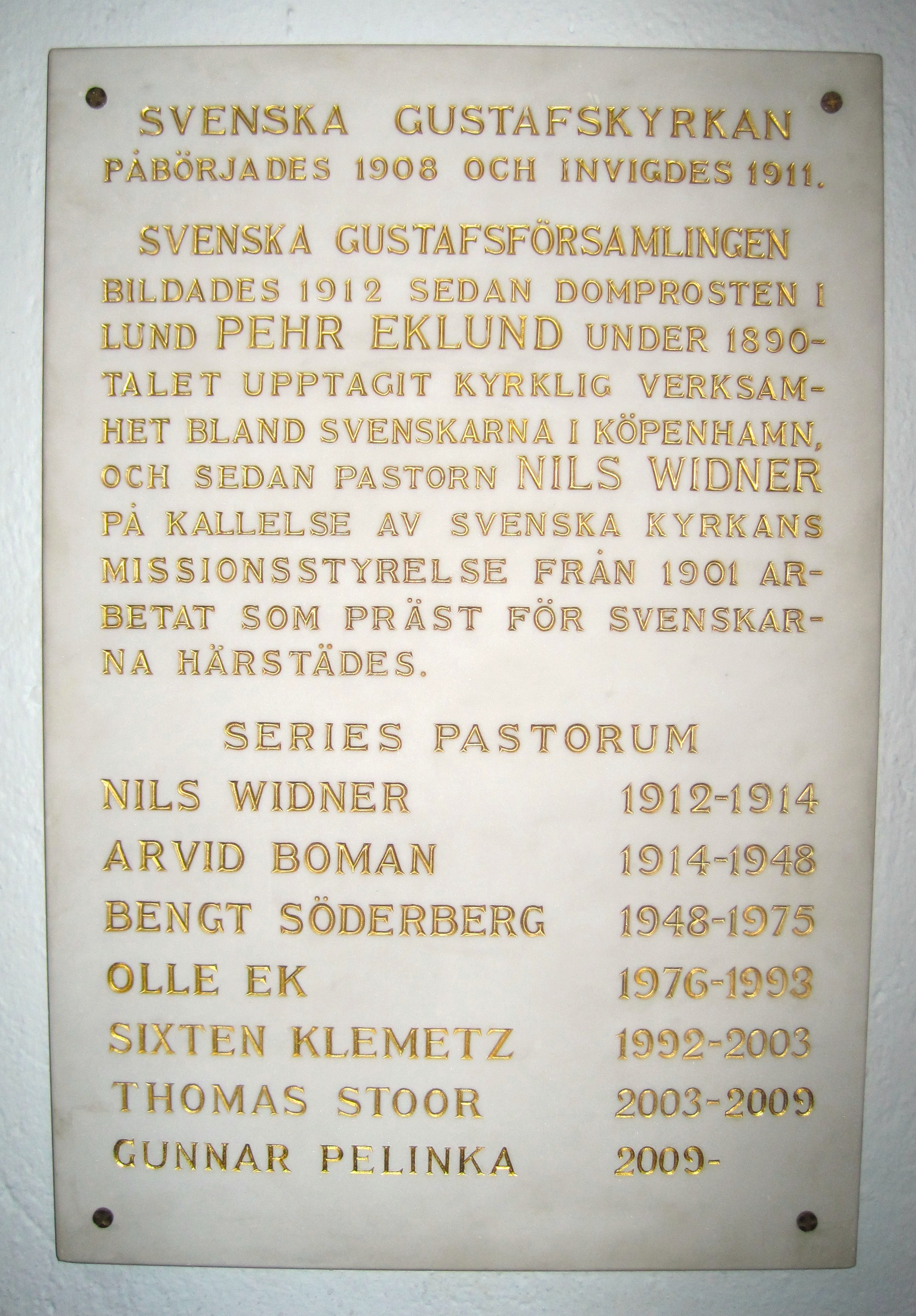
Series pastorum

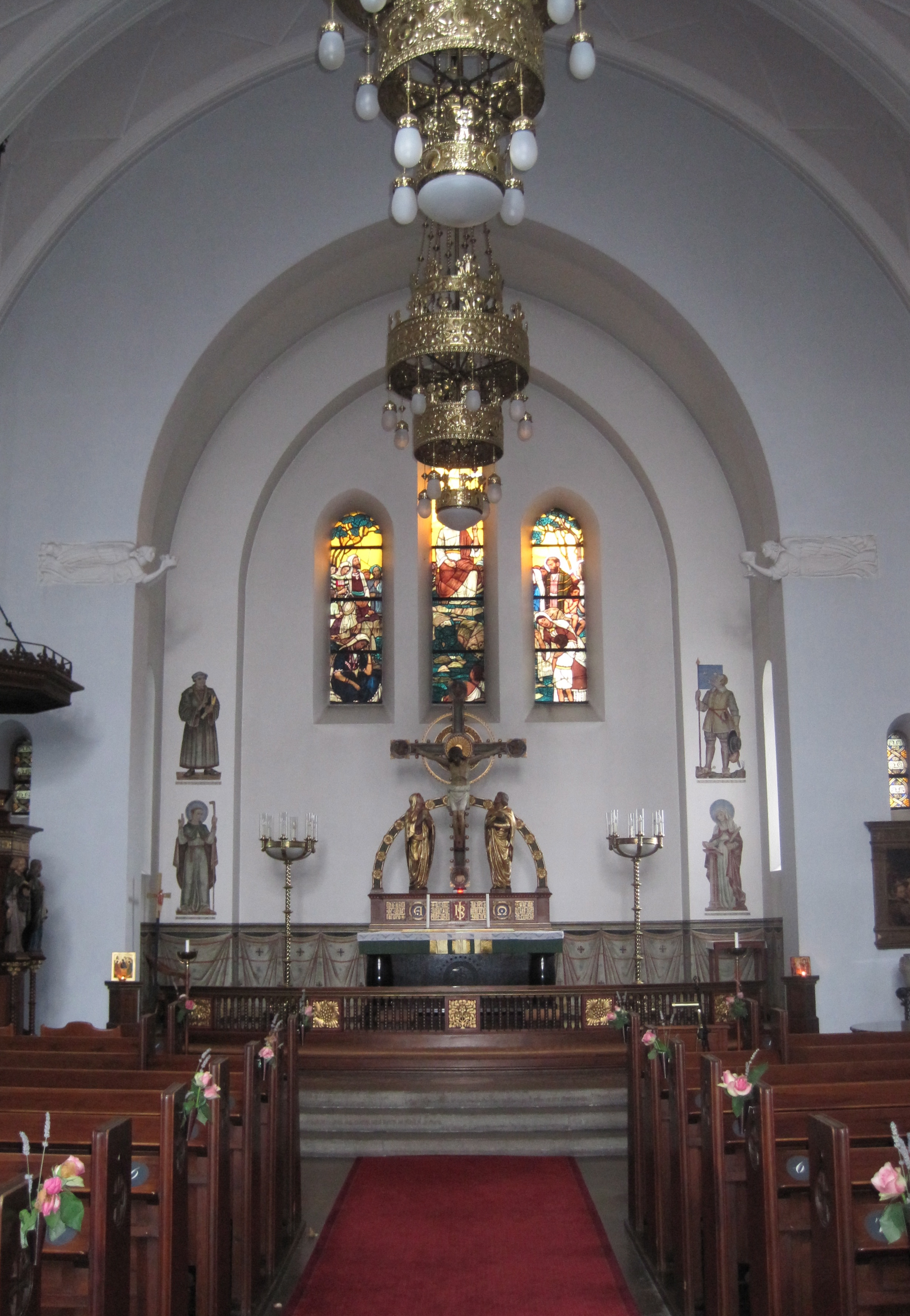
Interior

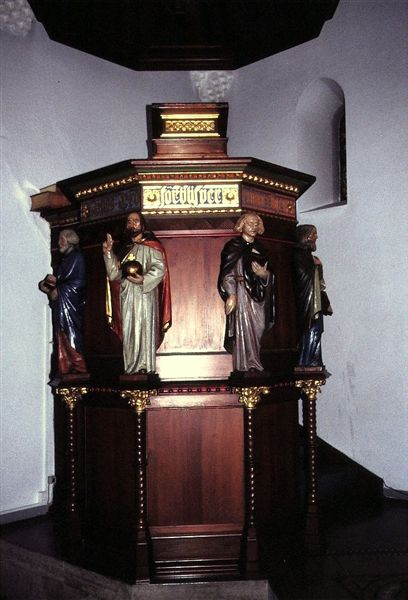
Pulpit

== See also ==
- House of Unitarians, Copenhagen
