= Garrison Church, Copenhagen =

Coordinates: 55.6818°N 12.5894°E

Garnison Church
- Garnisons Kirke
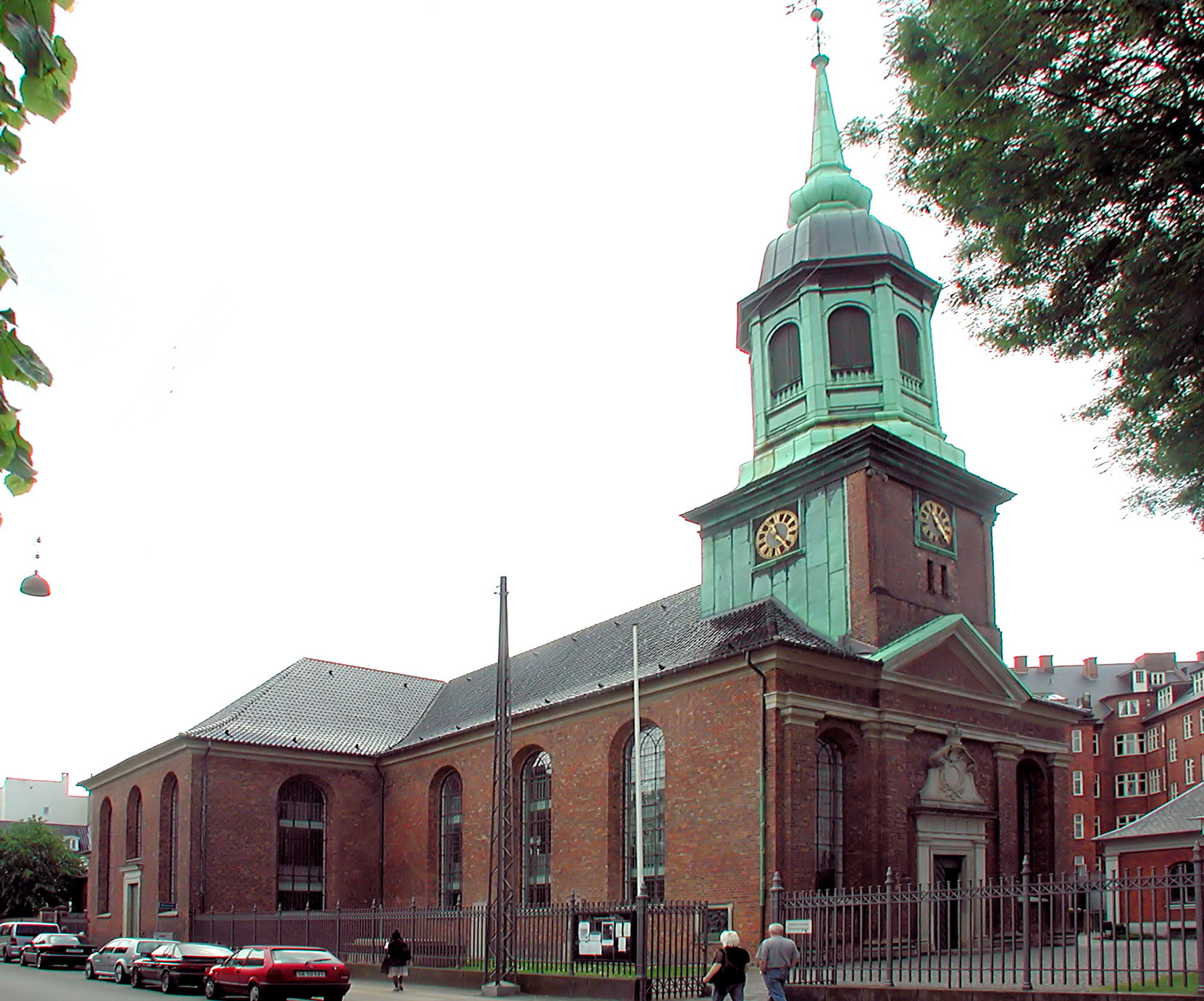
- Garnison Church
- Location: Copenhagen
- Country: Denmark
- Denomination: Church of Denmark
- Website: Church website

History
- Status: Active
- Founded: 18th century
- Founder: Frederick IV of Denmark
- Consecrated: 24 March 1706

Architecture
- Functional status: Parish Church
- Completed: 1706

Administration
- Diocese: Copenhagen

Clergy
- Bishop: Peter Skov-Jakobsen
- Vicar: Claus Oldenburg

The Garnison Church (Garnisons Kirke) is a church at Sankt Annæ Plads in Copenhagen, Denmark. The Baroque church was erected as a church primarily intended for military personnel stationed in the city.

== History ==
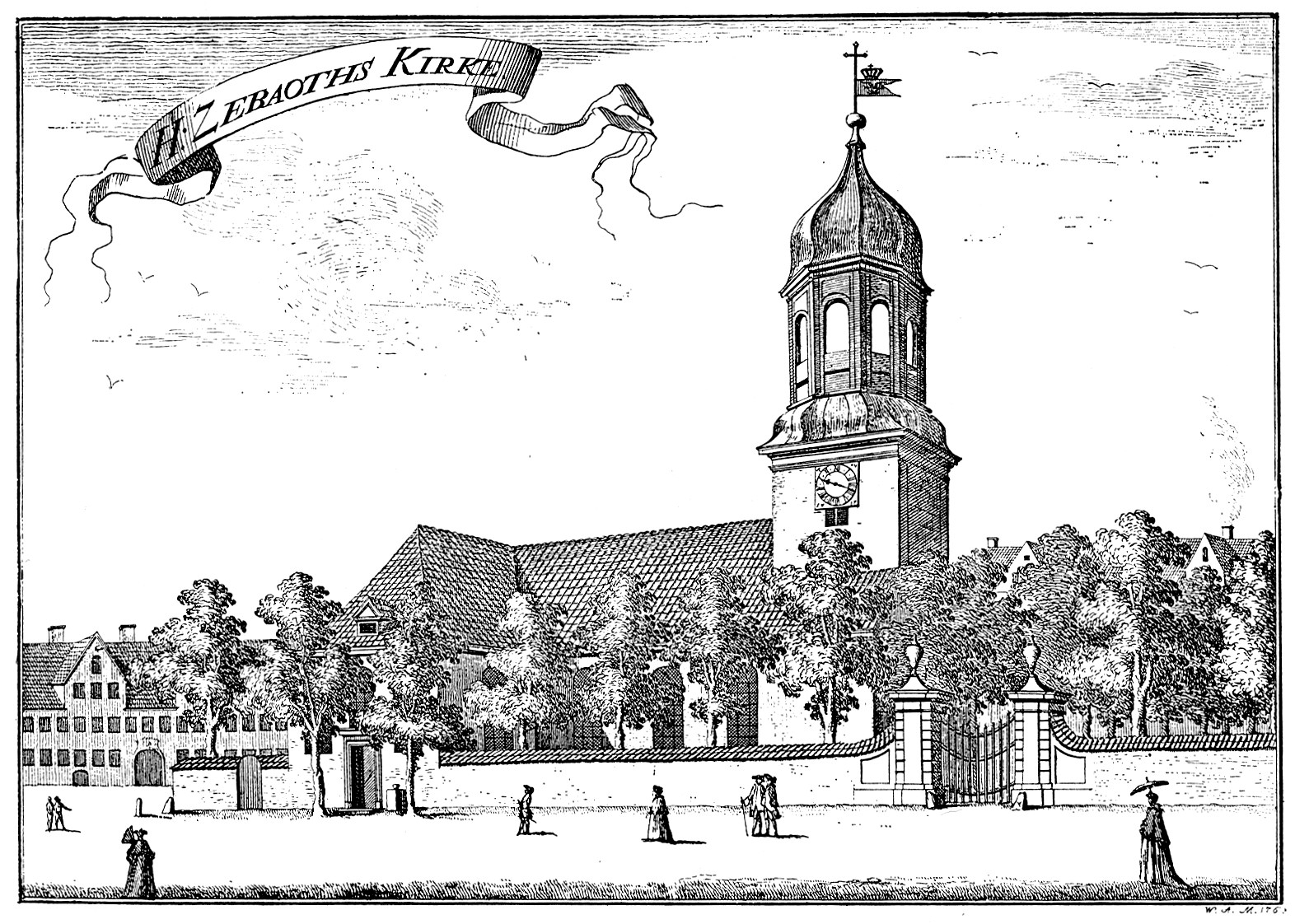
Illustration from Pontopidan's Danish Atlas from 1767

In the 17th century, Copenhagen had become home to a sizeable garrison. A military church was built at Kastellet in 1670, but its modest size only allowed it to serve the personnel at the fortress. The rest of the troops in the city had to use Church of Holmen, a former anchor forge which had been converted into a naval church in 1619.

When Sophie Amalienborg burned down in 1689, its chapel survived the flames and was subsequently put at the disposal of the Army. However, the small building which had been built for members of the royal court only served as a temporary solution. King Christian V therefore provided a tract of land at Dronningens Tværgade for the construction of a new church for the Army and military engineer Georg Philip Müller (ca 1684-ca 1706) completed a set of renderings in 1697. In order to keep down the costs of building the church, materials from Sophie Amalienborg were used. This also applied to the church chapel's furniture.

When King Frederick IV ascended the throne in 1699, he moved the project to a site in the southernmost section of Sophie Amalienborg's former gardens. Construction began in 1703, still to Müller's design but under the supervision of Domenico Pelli (1657–1728). The following year it was decided to build the church to a larger and somewhat modified design and the project was taken over by Danish architect Wilhelm Friedrich von Platen (1667–1732). The church was inaugurated on 24 March 1706.

The church underwent restoration in 1885 under the direction of architect Ludvig Knudsen (1843–1924). At that time, a burial chapel was built following drawings by Ludvig Knudsen as a free-standing building in the former cemetery. The interior of the church has been changed, repaired and renewed many times. The interior appearance of the church primarily stems from the renovation of 1954–1961 as it sought to revert to a more original appearance.

== Monuments and memorials ==
List of memorials at Garrison Church
Title / individual commemorated	Image	Sculptor	Installed	Ref.
Carl Wilder Memorial				
Christian Frederik Brorson Memorial				
Friderich Giesemann				
Georg Christopher von Styrup				
Heinrich Ludwig von Schimmelmann Memorial				
Indecipherable memorial				
J.Th. Lundbye Memorial				
Jörgen Valentin Sonne Memorial				
Mathias Pedersen Nostrup Memorial				
Olfert Ricard Memorial				
Christian August Lorentzen Memorial				
Christoffer Wilhelm Eckersberg				
One Of The Many		Ausa Hofman-Bang		

== Burials ==
- Johan Peter Emilius Hartmann (1805–1900), composer
- Christian August Lorentzen (1729–1828), painter
- lfert Ricard (1872–1929), writer and priest
