= Solvang Church =

Coordinates: 55.6488°N 12.5949°E

- Solvang Parish Church
- Solvang Kirke
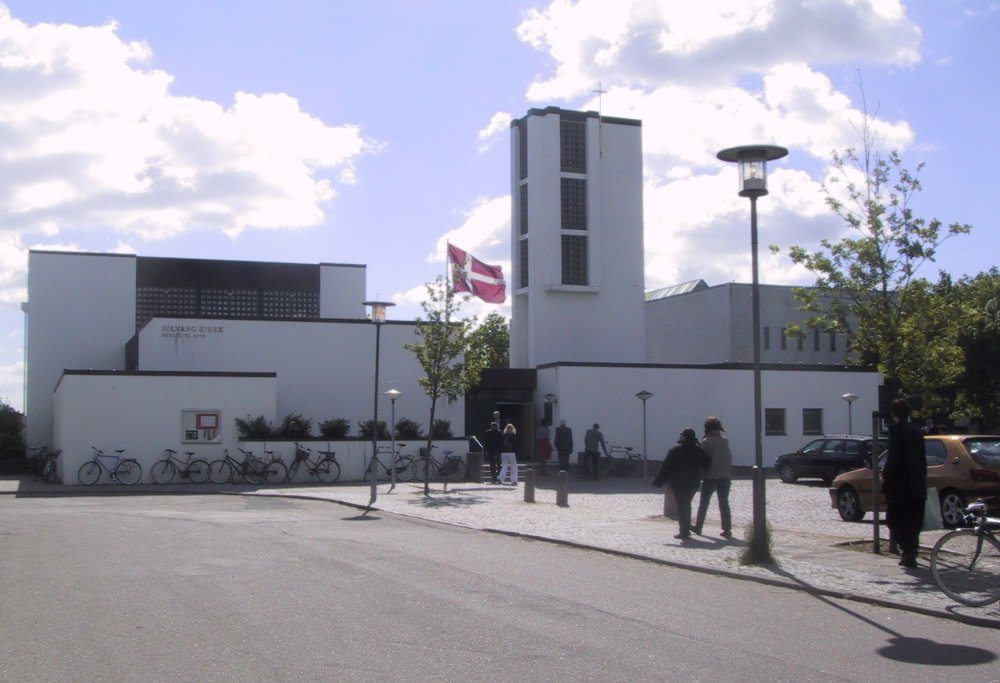
- Solvang Church
- Location: Copenhagen
- Country: Denmark
- Denomination: Church of Denmark
- Website: Church website

History
- Status: Active
- Consecrated: 26 September 1976

Architecture
- Functional status: Parish Church
- Architect: Holger Jensen
- Completed: 1976

Administration
- Diocese: Copenhagen
- Parish: Solvang

Clergy
- Bishop: Peter Skov-Jakobsen
- Pastor: Jens Henrik Jakobsen

Solvang Church (Solvang Kirke) is a church in the Amager district of Copenhagen, Denmark.

It was built between 1975 and 1976 on designs of architect Holger Jensen. It consists of a complex of box-shaped buildings, which also includes a parish hall and a confirmation halls. The church was renovated externally between 1998 and 1999, and inside between 2003 and 2005.
