= Church of the Free Port =

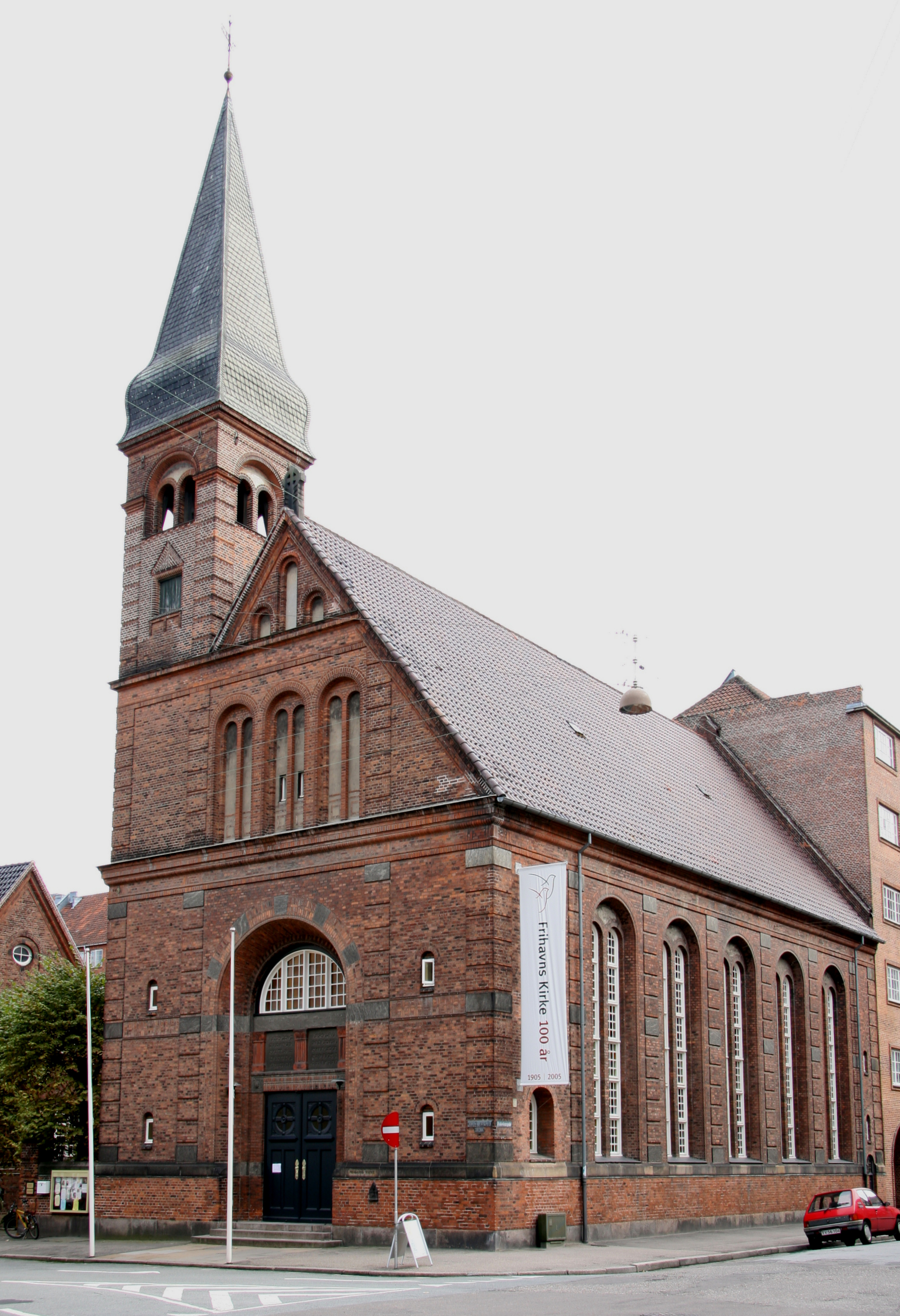
- The north gable
- Church of the Free Port
- 55°41′56″N 12°35′19″E
- Location: 68 Willemoesgade; Østerbro, Copenhagen
- Country: Denmark
- Denomination: Church of Denmark
- Website: www.sanktjakobskirke.dk (in Danish)

History
- Status: Church

Architecture
- Architect: Thorvlad Jørgensen
- Architectural type: Church
- Style: Neo-Baroque
- Completed: 1905

Specifications
- Materials: Brick

Administration
- Archdiocese: Diocese of Copenhagen

The Church of the Free Port (Danish: Frihavnskirken) is a Church of Denmark parish church in the Østerbro district of Copenhagen, Denmark. It was built in 1905 to designs by Thorvald Jørgensen, best known for his design of Christiansborg Palace, home to the Danish Parliament. It takes its name from the Freeport of Copenhagen which had been established on the coast just east of the church a decade earlier.

== History ==
The Church of the Free Port is one of several churches built with funds raised by the Society for the Construction of Small Churches in Copenhagen. The organization was founded at the initiative of Dorothea von Ripperda, a young noblewoman who learned about the severe shortage of churches in the new districts of Copenhagen at a meeting in the mission house Bethesda in 1886. She was later joined by many other young women who participated in the collection of money for the cause.

The architect Thorvald Jørgensen was charged with the design of the church which was completed in 1905. Its first pastor was H.P. Mollerup who later founded Kirkens Korshær. a Danish version of the British Church Army.

== Architecture ==
The church is oriented north-south and has a tower at its north-eastern corner. It is built in red brick with pilasters at the corners and between the round arched windows.
