= St. Elisabeth's Hospital, Copenhagen =

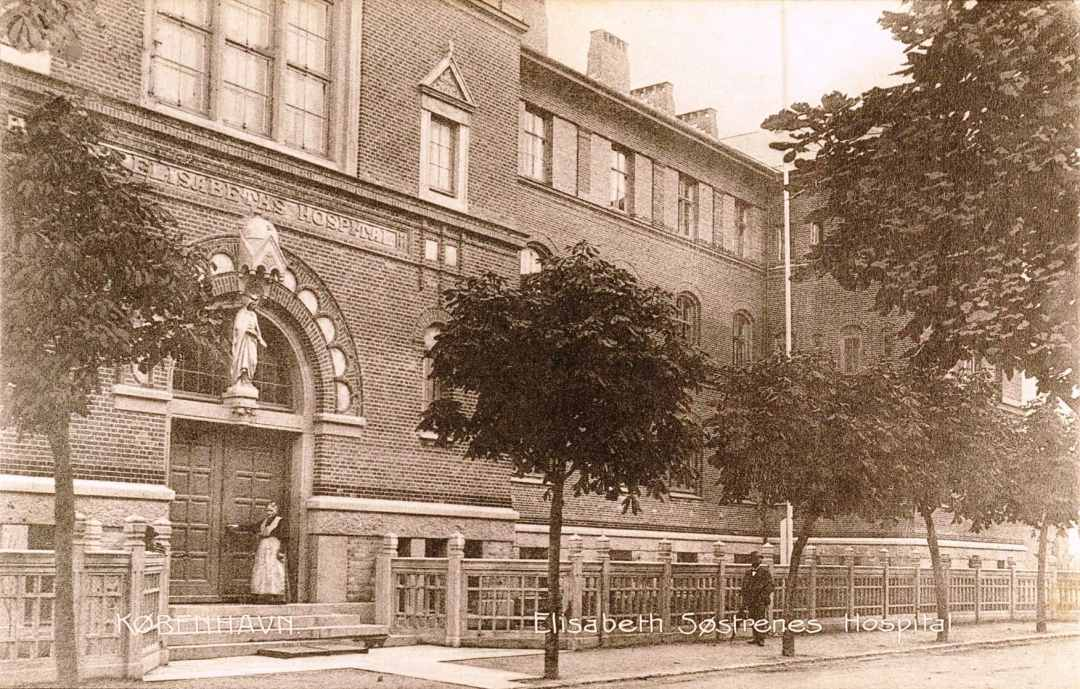
- St. Elizabeth's Hospital shortly after its opening in 1905

Geography
- Location: Amager, Copenhagen, Denmark
- Coordinates: 55.6547°N 12.6092°E

History
- Opened: 30 October 1905
- Closed: 1 April 1997 merged with Sundby Hospital

Links
- Lists: Hospitals in Denmark

St. Elizabeth's Hospital (Danish: Sankt Elisabeths Hospital) was a Catholic hospital on Amager in Copenhagen, Denmark, which existed from 1905 until 1997 when it was merged with Sundby Hospital to form Amager Hospital. Its old main building on Hans Bogbinders Allé, opposite the Catholic St. Anne's Church, is no longer used for hospital purposes.

== History ==
The hospital was founded by a community of Sisters of Saint Elizabeth which had been present in Copenhagen since 1895 where they were involved in outpatient nursing. The foundation stone was set on 1 October 1904 and the hospital was inaugurated, with 60 beds, on 30 October 1905. The architect was Emil Jørgensen who also designed a church on the other side of the street. It was replaced by the current St. Anne's Church in 1938.

The Grey Nuns operated the hospital until 1 April 1970 when it was taken over by Copenhagen County. On 1 April 1997 Copenhagen County's St. Elizabeth's Hospital was merged with Copenhagen Municipality's Sundby Hospital to form Amager Hospital.

In 2010, Region Hovedstaden announced that St. Elizabeth's old buildings would either be sold off or rented out for other use.

== Architecture ==
The hospital building is built in red brick to a National Romantic style with details in granite, chalk and soapstone. The hospital was expanded in 1924 and 1932.

The vestibule and main staircase was between 1928 and 1935 decorated with murals and frescos by Jais Nielsen, representing scenes from Saint Elizabeth's life. The work was a gift from the Ny Carlsberg Foundation. In 2015 the Ny Carlsberg Foundation sponsored a restoration of Nielsen's murals undertaken by conservators from National Museum.

== See also ==
- Diakonissestiftelsen
