= Sundby Church =

- Sundby Kirke
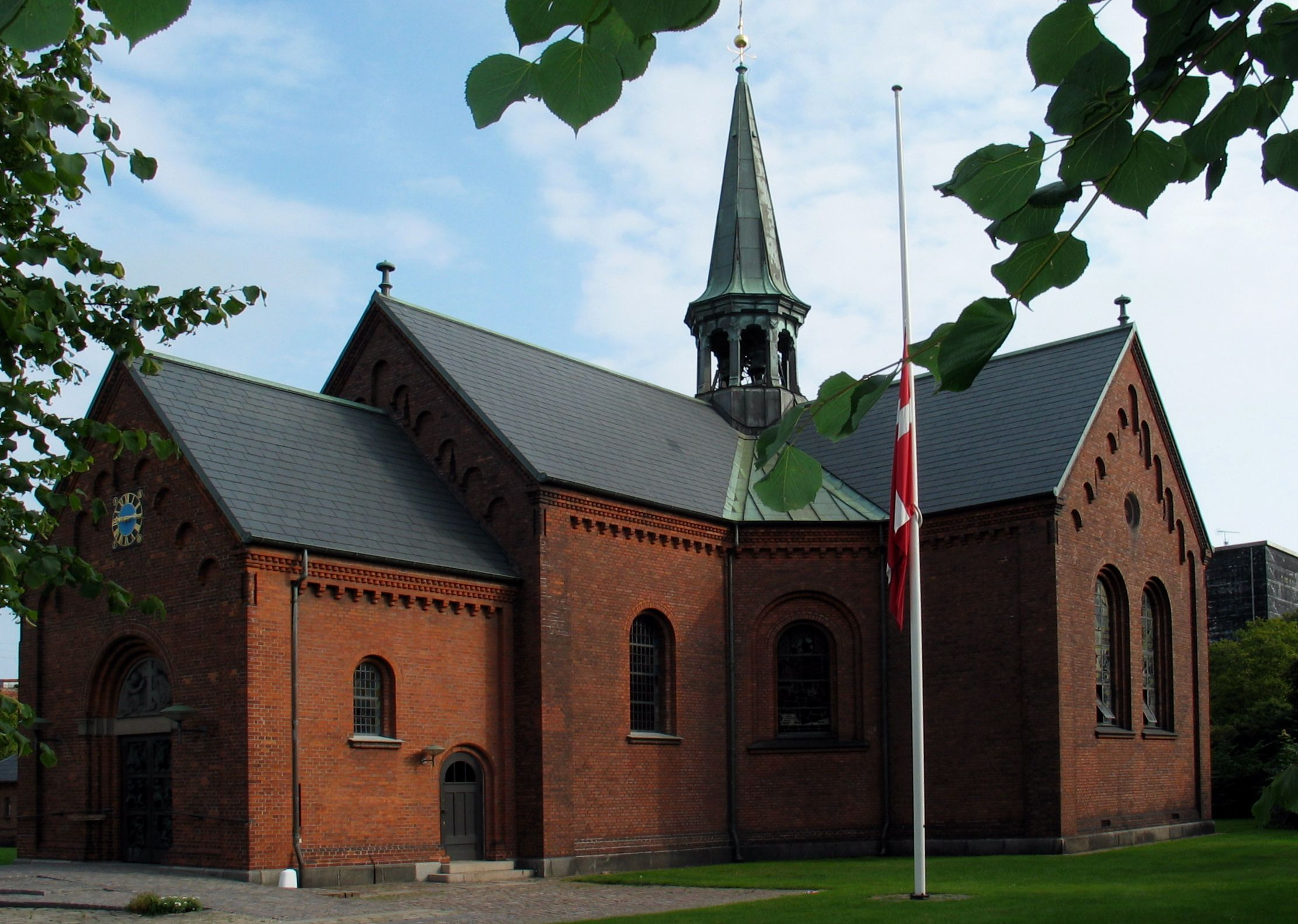
- Sundby Church Holmbladsgade
- Sundby Church
- 55°39′39″N 12°36′19″E
- Location: 71 Amagerbrogade; Copenhagen
- Country: Denmark
- Denomination: Church of Denmark

History
- Status: Active

Architecture
- Functional status: Parish Church
- Architect: Hans Jørgen Holm
- Architectural type: Church
- Groundbreaking: 1869
- Completed: 1870

Specifications
- Materials: Brick

Administration
- Diocese: Copenhagen

Sundby Church (Danish: Sundby Kirke) is a Church of Denmark parish church located on Amagerbrogade in Copenhagen, Denmark. Completed in 1870 to designs by Hans Jørgen Holm, it is the oldest church on the northern part of Amager.

== History ==
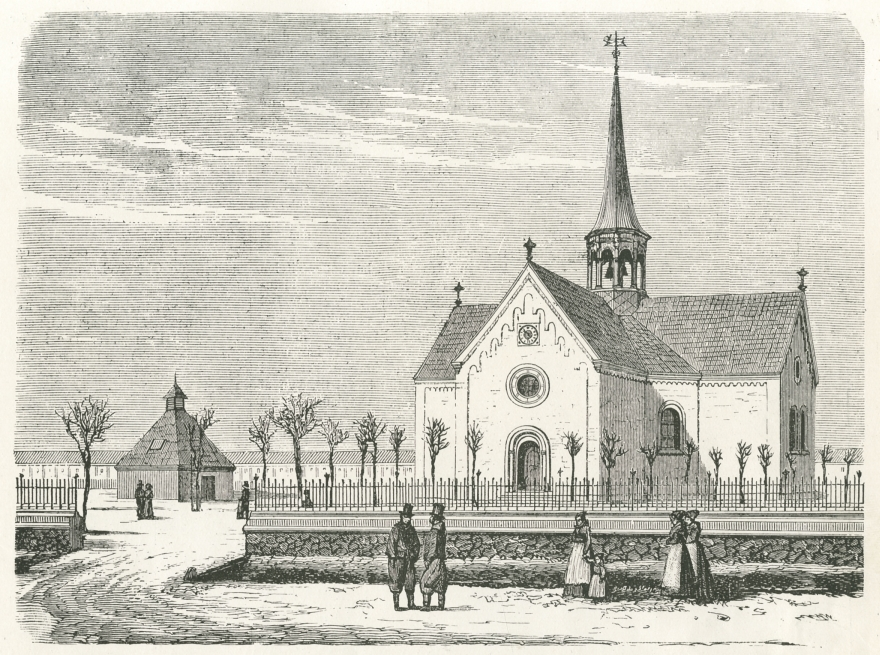
Sundby Church in 1760

In the middle of the 19th century, Sundby still belonged to the parish of Tårnby but the old village church there was located almost five kilometres away. A local committee was therefore established in 1868 to raise money for the construction of a new church, charging the architect Hans Jørgen Holm with its design. Construction began in 1869 and the new church was consecrated in 1870.

Nathanael's Parish was disjoined from Sundby Parish in 1899.

The church was refurbished by Frederik Zeuthen and Cai Bertelsen in 1963.

== Architecture ==
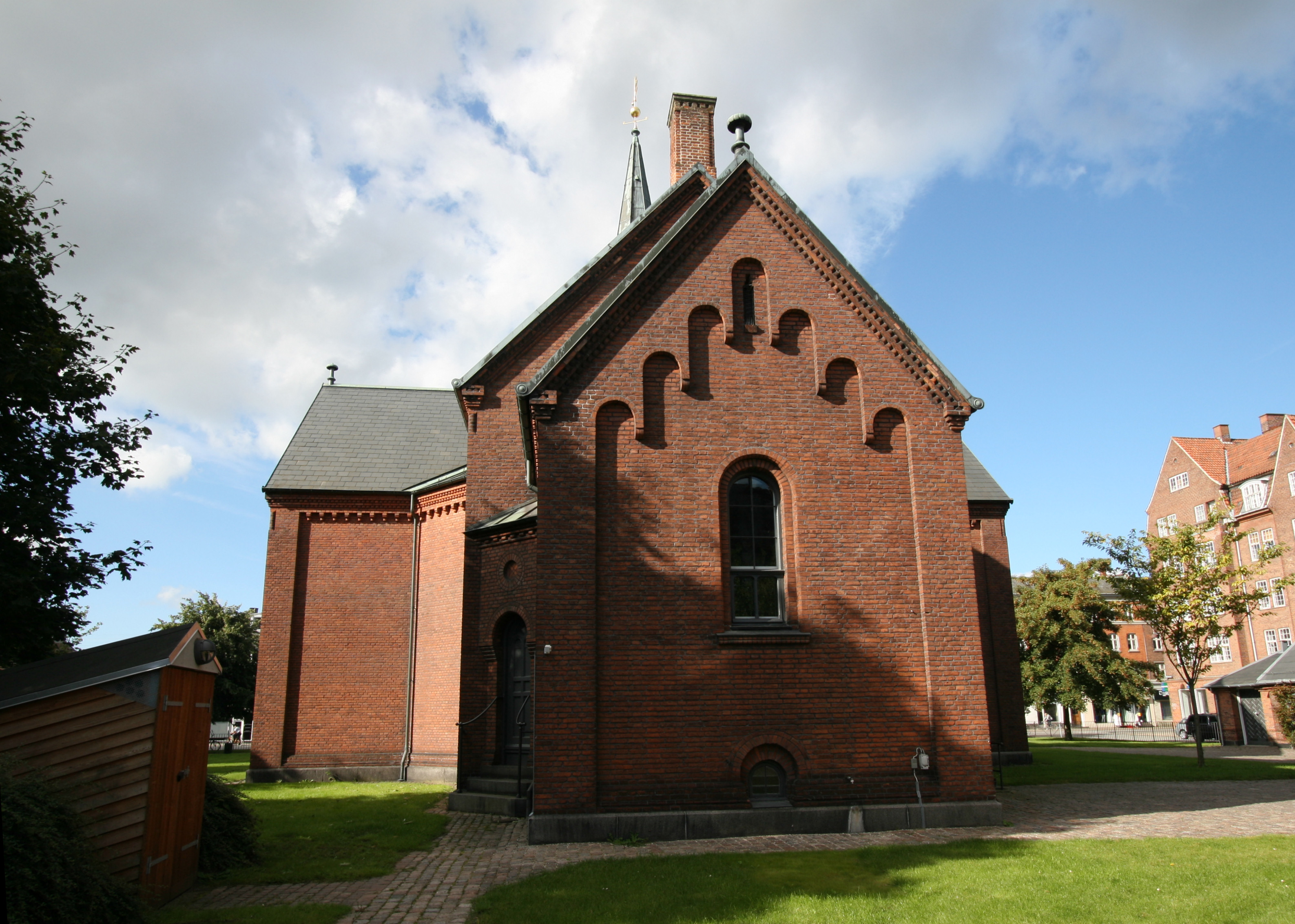
The east gable

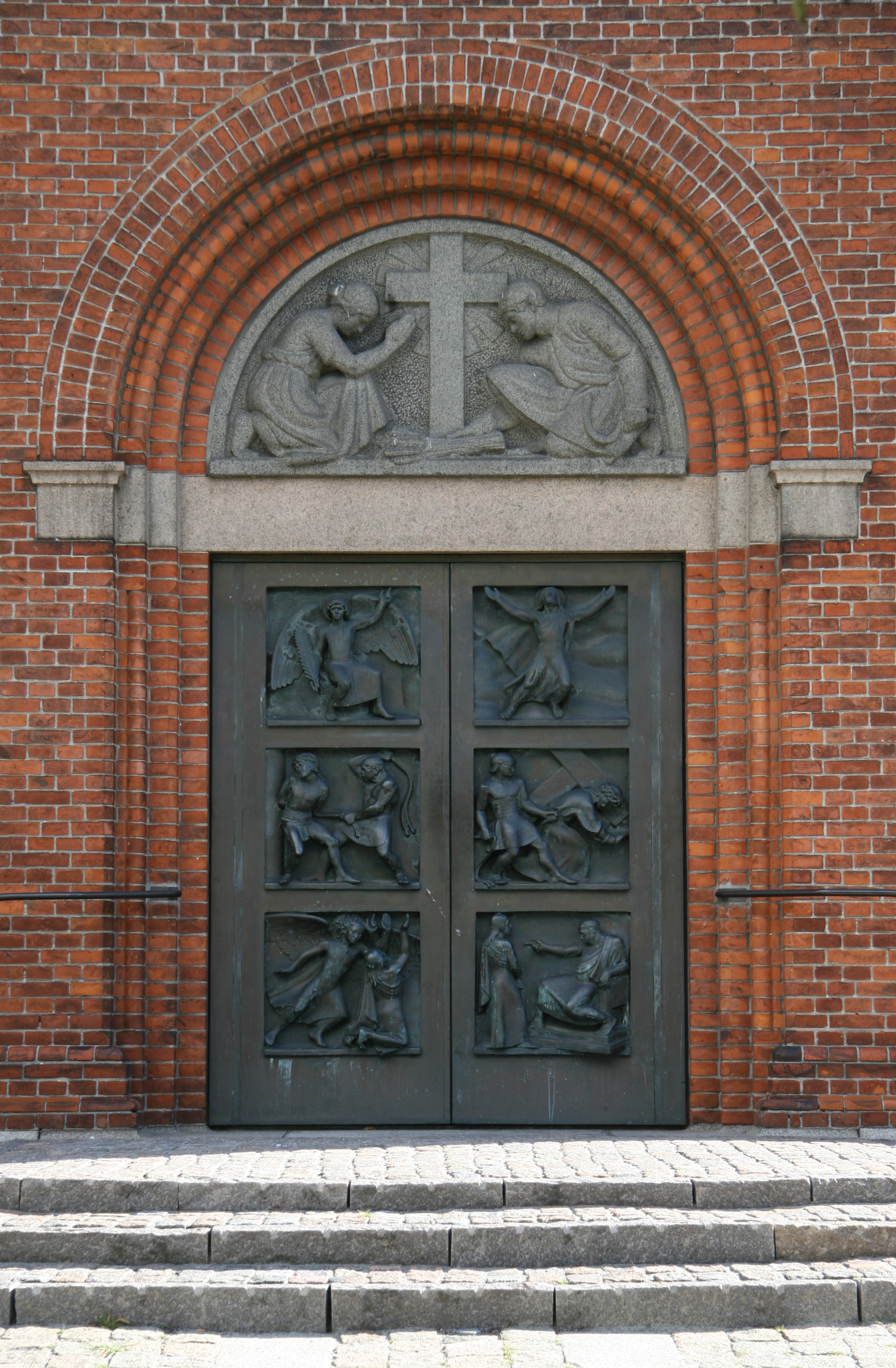
The door of the porch

The church has a cruciform plan and is built in red brick to a Neo-Romanseque design. The roof is topped by an octagonal flèche. The chancel faces north-east. Decorations include corner leseness and round arched friezes on the gables.

A porch was built at the nave's south-west gable in 1941. Its tympanum and bronze door were designed by the artist Max Andersen. The bronze door was installed in 1974 to mark the 100th anniversary of the church. The tympanum's relief is identical to the one above the entrance of Absalon Church on Sønder Boulevard. The six reliefs on the bronze door show scenes associated with the Passion of Christ.

== Sundby Cemetery ==
Sundby Cemetery (Danish: Sundby Kirkegård) was established in 1872 at a site a little to the south of the church and is the main cemetery for Amager. It consists of an old and a modern section, located on either side of Kastrupvej, with a combined area of 10 hectares. The old section will be decommissioned in 2020.
