= Martin's Church, Copenhagen =

Martin's Church
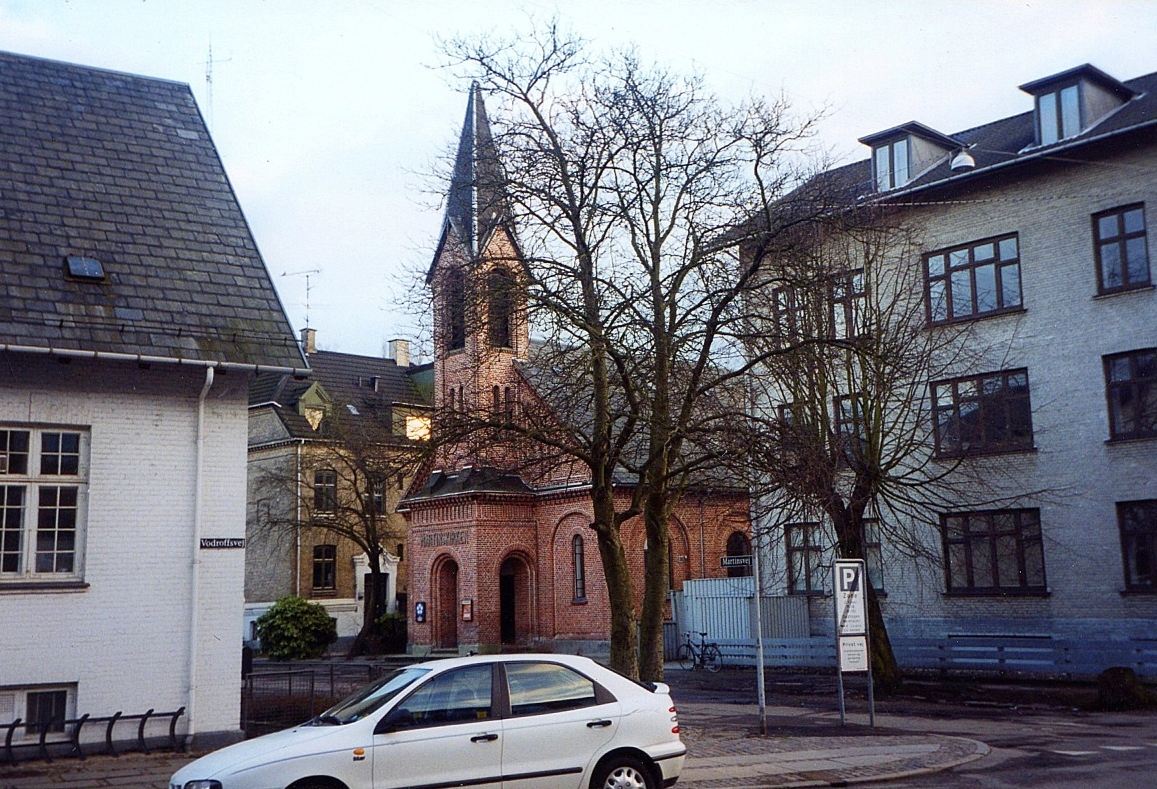
- Martin's Church
- 55°40′47.64″N 12°33′20.34″E
- Location: Frederiksberg, Copenhagen
- Country: Denmark
- Denomination: Evangelical Lutheran Free Church

History
- Status: Church

Architecture
- Architect(s): Alfred Jensen and August Johansen
- Architectural type: Church
- Style: Gothic Revival
- Completed: 1877

Specifications
- Materials: Brick

Martin's Church (Danish: Martinskirken), located on Martinsvej in Frederiksberg, just west of St. Jørgen's Lake, is one of the only two church buildings in the Evangelical Lutheran Free Church in Copenhagen, Denmark. It was built in 1877 and refurbished in 1998–99. The other church is Gratiakirken (grace church) in Aarhus.

== History ==
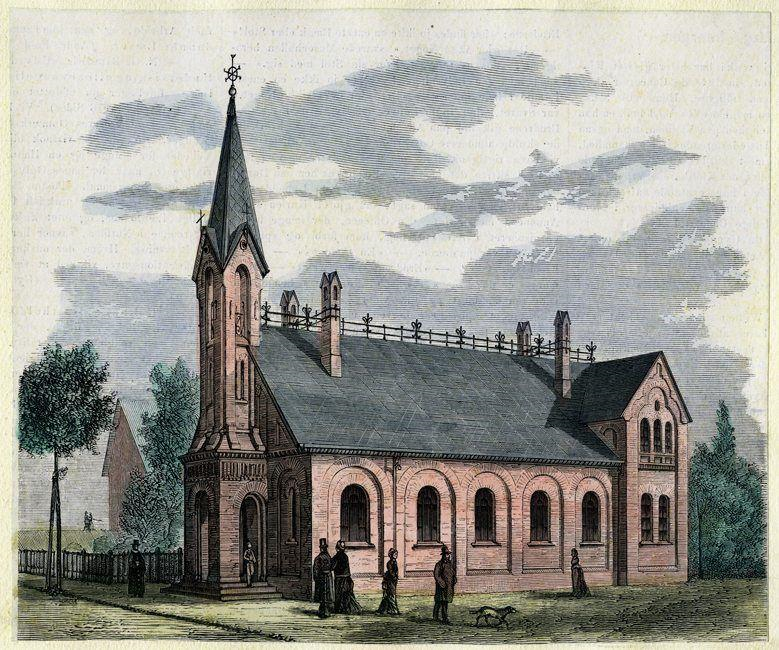
Martin's Church in 1877

In 1855 pastor Niels Pedersen Grunnet founded an evangelical-Lutheran congregation in Copenhagen.

The architects Alfred Jensen and August Johansen were commissioned to design a church for the congregation in the mid-1870s and a site was purchased on the east side of Vodroffsvej in Fredeirksberg. The foundation stone was set on 18 March 1877 and the church was consecrated on 19 August that same year. The construction cost was approximately DKK 30,000. Grunnet died in 1897.

The church building was refurbished in 1998–99. Retired American craftsmen from Laborers for Christ (Lutheran Church–Missouri Synod) assisted with the renovation as volunteers.

== Architecture ==
The church is built in red brick and stands on a plinth of granite. The tower as topped by a copper-clad spire and stands 70 feet tall. The barrel vaulted nave has seating for approximately 140. On organ is mounted on the wall above the entrance. Above the chancel is an pol painting of Vhrist.
