= Simon Peter's Church =

Church in Copenhagen, Denmark

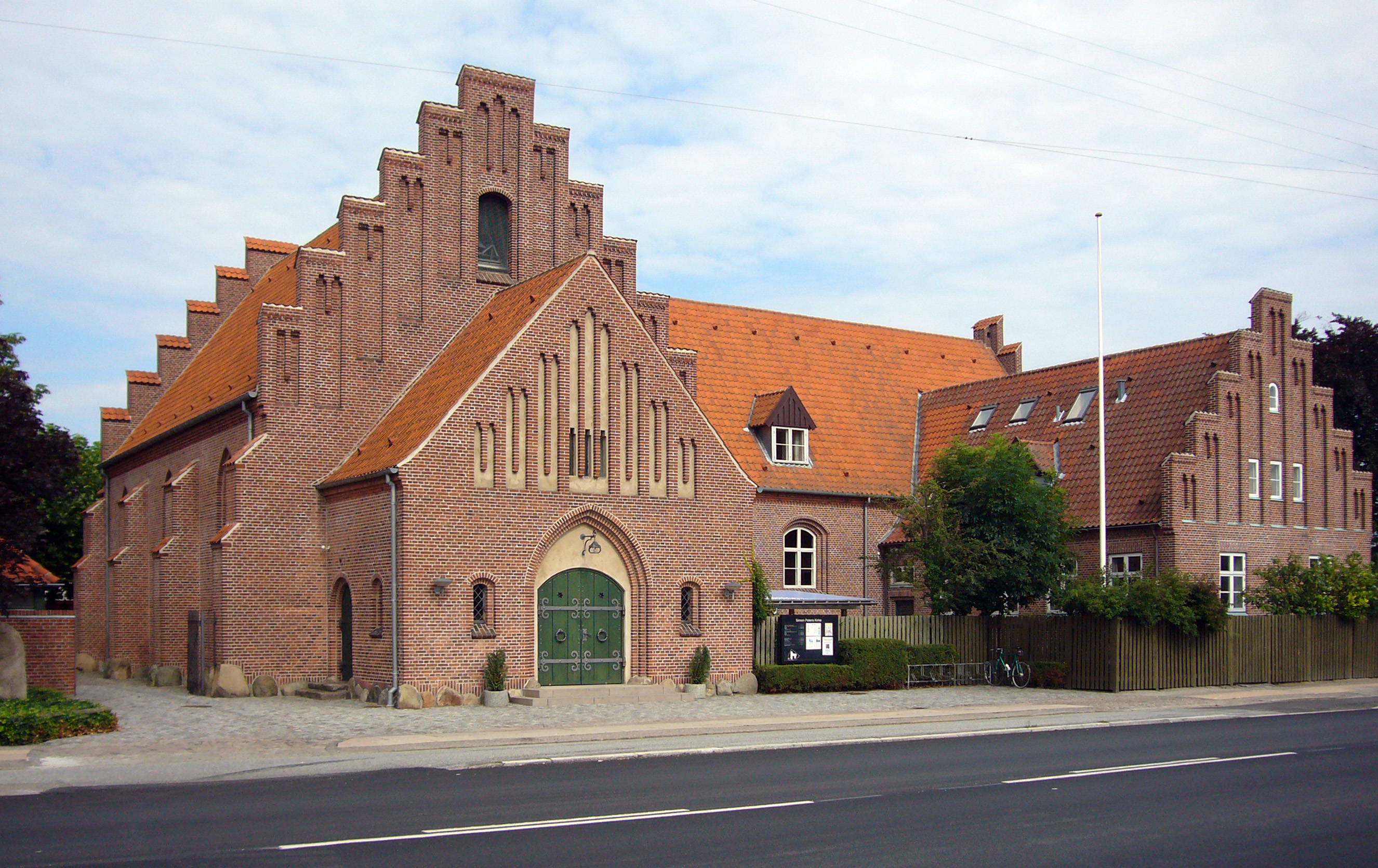
- Nathanael's Church seen from Kastrupvej
- Simon Peter's Church
- 55°38′49.58″N 12°37′25.95″E
- Location: 155 Kastrupvej; 2300 Copenhagen S
- Country: Denmark
- Denomination: Church of Denmark

History
- Status: Church

Architecture
- Architect: Paul Staffeldt Matthiesen
- Architectural type: Church
- Completed: 1944

Specifications
- Materials: Brick

Administration
- Diocese: Copenhagen

Simon Peter's Church (Danish: Simon Peters Kirke) is a Church of Denmark parish church in Amager, Copenhagen, Denmark.

== History ==
Simon Peter's Church was built by the Copenhagen Church Foundation. The current congregation house was built in 1930 and was used for church services until the new church was completed. The parish was created on 1 April 1935. P.L. Jensen, pastor at Philip's Church since 1829, was a driving force behind the construction of the new church. It was designed by Poul Staffeldt Matthiesen, who a few years earlier had completed the nearby Højdevang Church. Simon Peter's Church was inaugurated on 10 September 1944.

== Architecture ==
The church is designed in Neo-Gothic style with inspiration from Baltic village churches of the 14th century.
