= St. Anne's Church, Copenhagen =

St Anne's Church
- Sankt Annæ Kirke
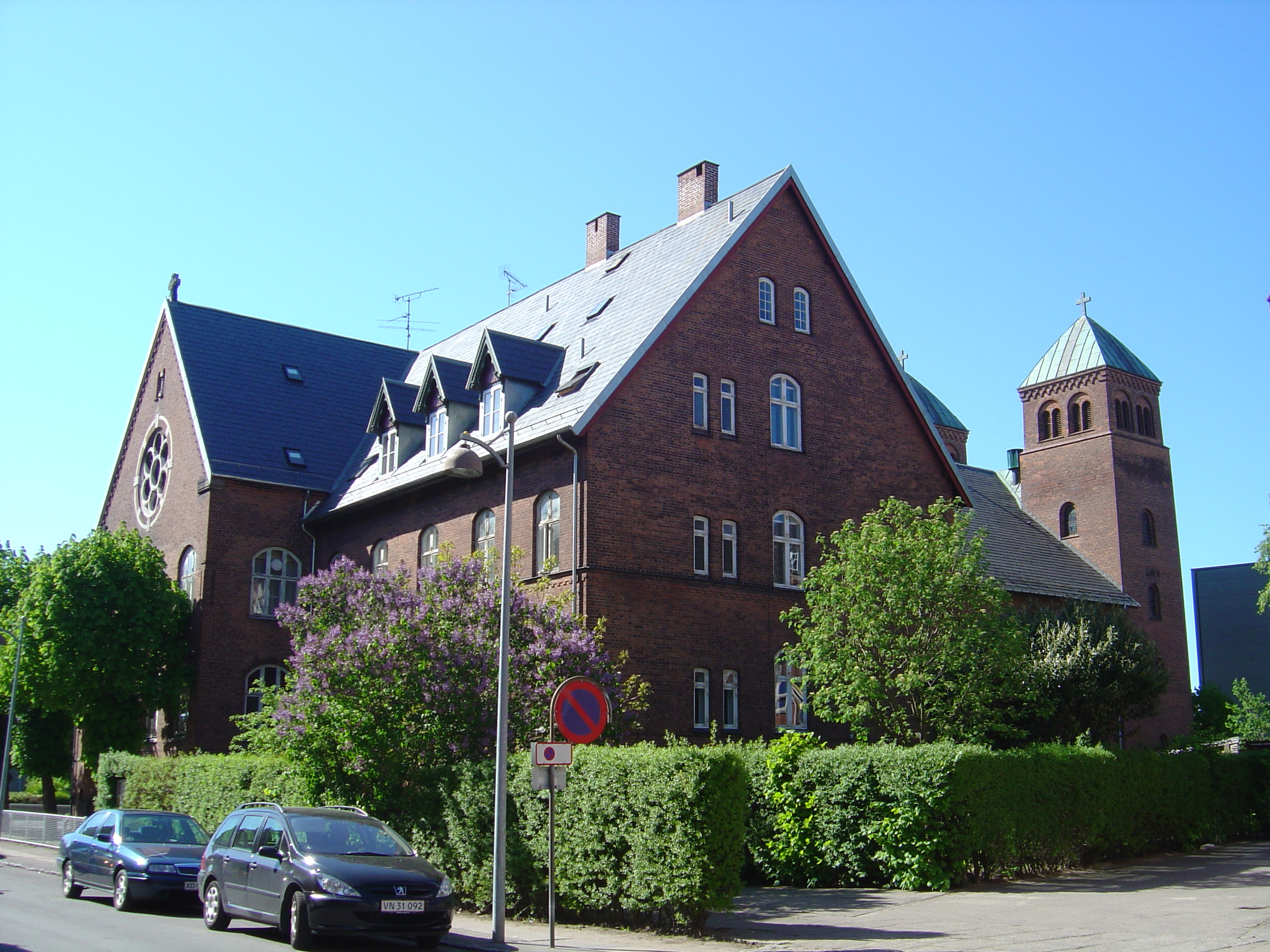
- St. Ann's Church viewed from the corner of Hans Bogbinders Allé with Amagerbrogade
- St Anne's Church
- 55°39′18″N 12°36′33″E
- Location: Copenhagen
- Country: Denmark
- Denomination: Roman Catholic

History
- Status: Active
- Founded: 1936
- Dedication: Saint Anne
- Consecrated: 26 November 1938

Architecture
- Functional status: Parish Church
- Architect: Sven Risom
- Style: National Romantic

Administration
- Diocese: Copenhagen

St. Anne's Church (Danish: Sankt Annæ Kirke) is a Roman-Catholic church in Sundby on Amager in Copenhagen, Denmark. It is located just off Amagerbrogade, next to Eberts Villaby. The church is closely affiliated with the nearby St. Ann's School.

== History ==
The church traces its history back to 1897 when a house on Christian II's Vej in Eberts Villaby, which had recently been completed by a local developer, came into use as the first Catholic place of worship on Amager in modern times. Known as St. Anne's Chapel (Danish: Sankt Annæ Kapel), it was used for church service on Sundays and as a Catholic school on weekdays.

The chapel was in 1903 replaced by a proper church building, St. Anne's Church. It was built in connection with the Grey Nun's establishment of St. Elizabeth's Hospital which opened on the other side of the street two years later. The architect of the church was Emil Jørgensen who also designed the hospital and Sønderbro Pharmacy which opened next to hospital in 1904.

When St. Anne's Church became too small for the growing population on Amager, it was decided to replace it with a larger one. The old building was demolished in 1935, and the foundation stone for its replacement, which was designed by Sven Risom, was set by Bishop Josef Brems on 19 November 1936. The church was consecrated on 26 March 1938.

== Architecture ==
The church is built in red brick in a National Romantic style. It is 29 metres long ( 95 feet ) and 18 metres wide ( 59 feet ). Its twin towers stand at 24.5 metres ( 80 feet ). It seats 400.

== Interior and fittings ==
The altarpiece consists of four paintings, depicting four key events in Jesus's life on earth: The Birth of Christ, the Last Supper, at the Foot of the Cross and Christ's Ascension. The paintings as well as the large crucifix were created by the artist Wilhelm Wils and installed in 1954.

Dating from 1946, Our Lady of Perpetual Help's altar was created by the sculptor Axel Theilmann. The icon was created by Birgitte West as an exact copy of the original icon in Church of St. Alphonsus Liguori in Rome. The central image is surrounded by six reliefs representing the Annunciation, Jesus' birth, the Marriage at Cana, the Pieta and the Assumption. They are executed by the sculptor Wedel-Schmidt and were inaugurated on 1 May 1947. An inscription reads: "In 1944/45, as the war came closer to Denmark, leaving everybody frightened, St. Anne's congregation promised to raise this altar in honor of God and his holy Mother, the perpetual Help."

In connection with the 300-year commemoration of the scientist Nicolas Steno's birth in 1938, two silver candlesticks with the scientist's coat of arms were donated to the church.

The font was originally installed in the first St. Anne's church in 1903. It is carved in Bremers sandstone to a design by the architect Emil Jorgensen.

== Service ==
Services are held at different times of the day in Danish, English and Polish.

== St. Ann's School ==
St. Ann's School is now located at Otto Ruds Vej 7. The bilingual school has about 500 students (Grade 0-10) and a staff of about 40 teachers. The school logo features a Viking ship carrying an image of the church on its sail.
