= Emil Jørgensen (architect) =

Danish architect

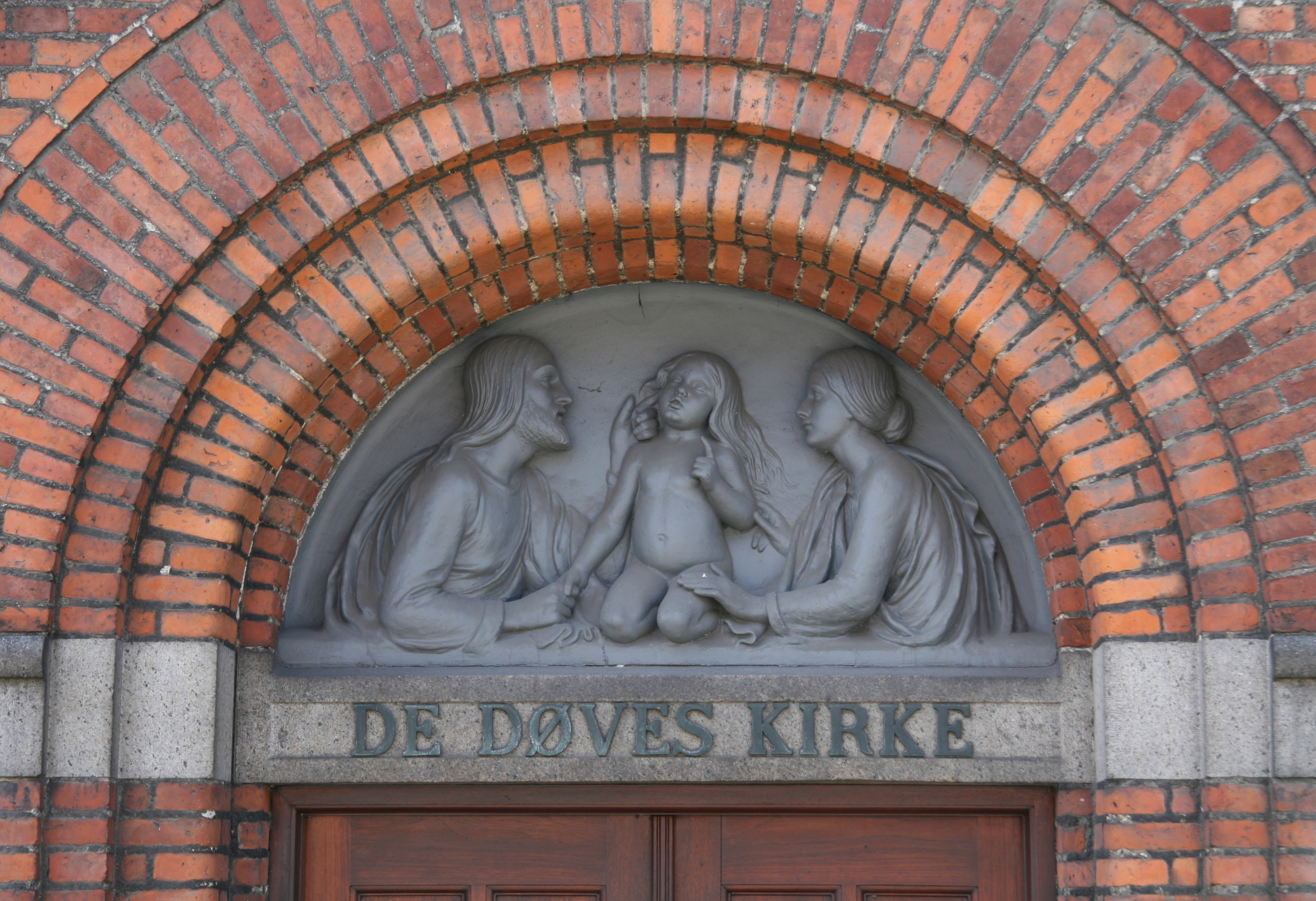
De Døves Kirke in Copenhagen

Emil Gustav Vilhelm Jørgensen (3 September 1858 - 27 May 1942) was a Danish architect, most notable for his work in the National Romantic style such as the Church of the Deaf (De Døves Kirke) in Copenhagen.

== Biography ==
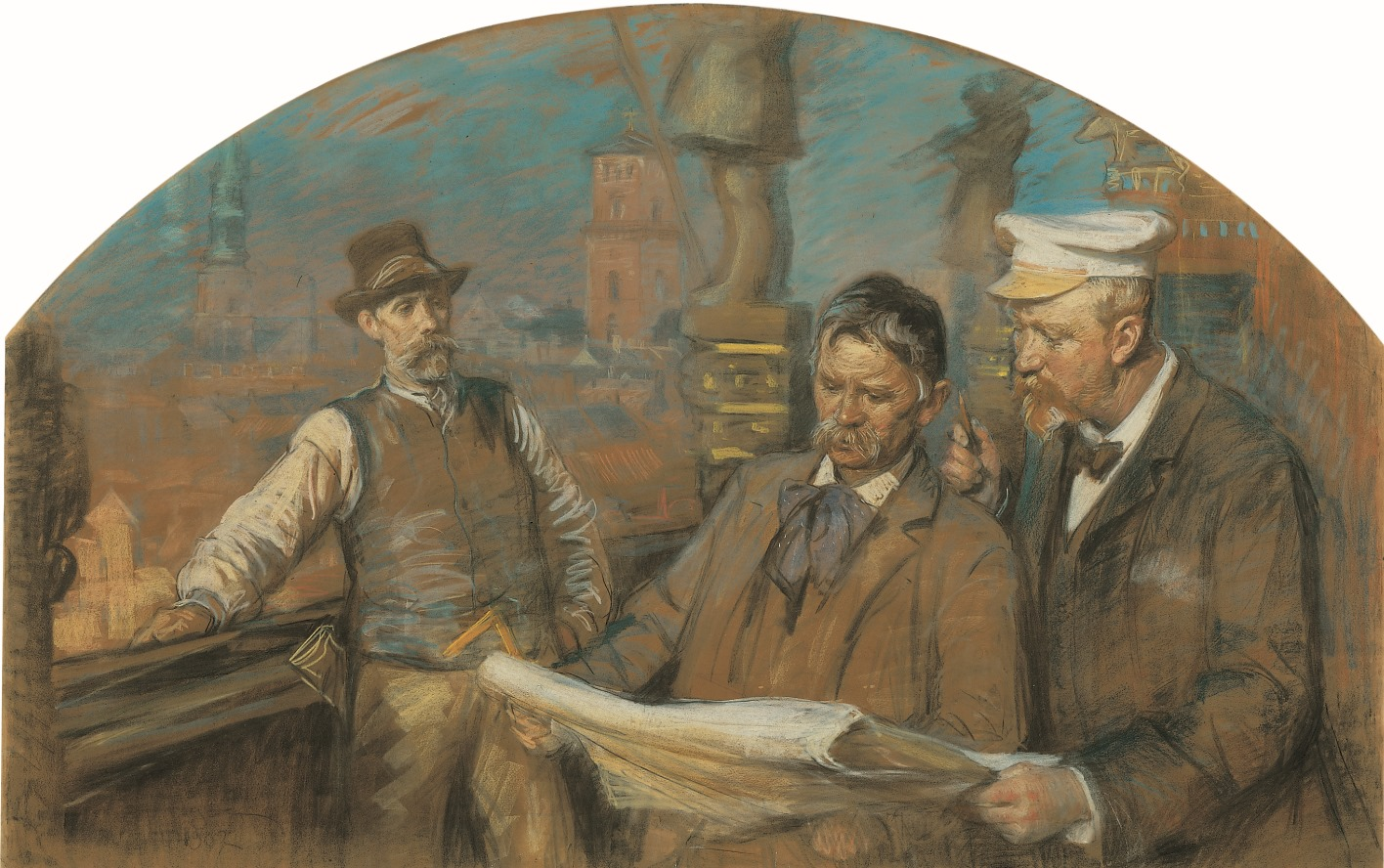
P. S: Krøyer: Martin Nyrop (centre) and Emil Jørgensen (right) in conversation at Copenhagen City Hall, 1902

He was born at Rendsburg in Schleswig-Holstein. He was the son of Andreas Carl Gustav Jørgensen (1831–80) and his wife Vilhelmine Wille (1836–1909). He graduated from the Technical University of Denmark and was admitted to the Academy of Fine Arts' Architecture School (Kunstakademiets Arkitektskole) in 1876. He graduated as an architect in 1883. In 1892, he conducted travel studies to Germany and Northern Italy. For over a decade he worked with architect Hans Jørgen Holm. He was later associated with the Copenhagen Town Hall and Bispebjerg Hospital projects as a close assistant of architect Martin Nyrop.

Jørgensen exhibited at Charlottenborg Spring Exhibition 1886, 1888, 1891, 1899, 1900 and 1903–04.

== Personal life ==
Jørgensen married Anna Margrethe Christine Knudsen (1863–1923) in 1888. Jørgensen was created a Knight in the Order of the Dannebrog and was awarded Medal of Honour.

He died on 27 May 1942 in Gentofte and was buried in Vestre Cemetery (Vestre Kirkegård) in Copenhagen.

== Other sources ==
- Vestre Kirkegård
