= Peter Skov-Jakobsen =

Danish clergyman and theologian (born 1959)

The Right Reverend Peter Skov-Jakobsen
- Bishop of Copenhagen; Primate of Denmark
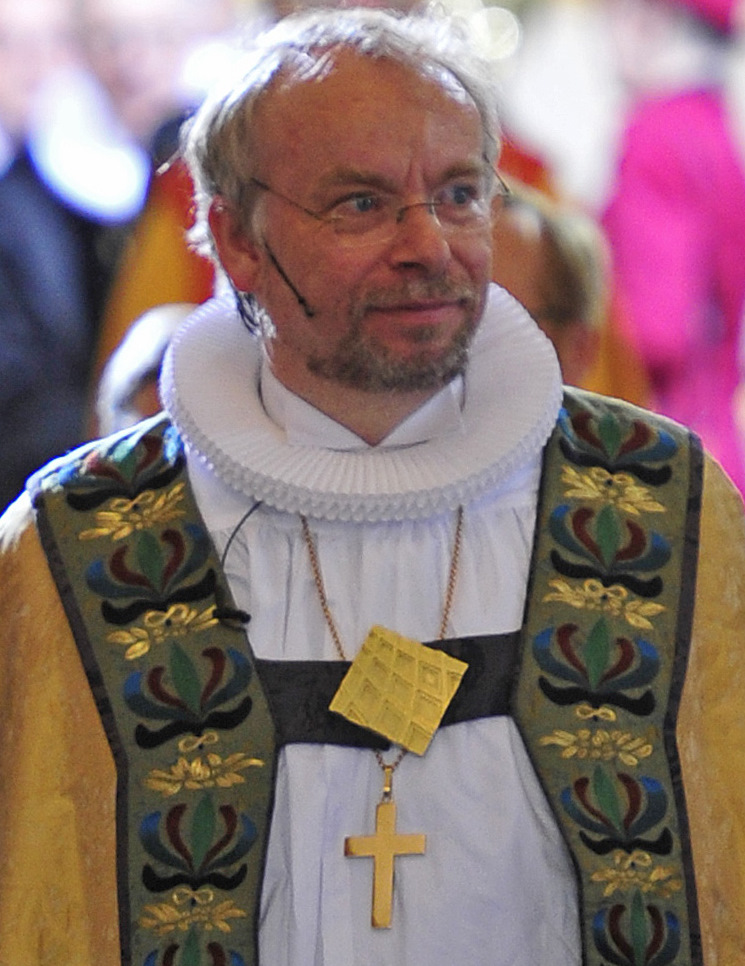
- Church: Church of Denmark
- Diocese: Copenhagen
- Elected: 16 July 2009
- Predecessor: Erik Norman Svendsen

Orders
- Ordination: 1993
- Consecration: 31 August 2009 by Erik Norman Svendsen

Personal details
- Born: 22 February 1959 (age 67) Korup, Denmark
- Children: 2

Peter Henrik Skov-Jakobsen (born 22 February 1959 in Korup, Denmark) is a Danish bishop and theologian. Since 2009 he has been the sixth bishop of the Diocese of Copenhagen and consequently the primus inter pares of the Church of Denmark.

== Education ==
Skov-Jakobsen graduated from St. Canute High School in Odense in 1979, which was followed by two years of study in Germany. In 1992 he completed a Masters of Arts in Theological Understanding of Industrial Society at the University of Hull. This happened while he was studying theology at the University of Copenhagen. In July 1993, after completion of his studies, he became a Cand.theol.

== Priesthood ==
Between October 1988 and August 1993, Skov-Jakobsen worked as an assistant at the Seaman's Mission in the English city of Kingston upon Hull. After he completed his theology examinations, he was ordained as a sailor priest in the Church of England. He remained there until December 1997. In January 1998 Skov-Jakobsen was appointed as parish priest of the Church of Holmen in Copenhagen. In 2000 he became a lecturer at the Royal Danish Theatre school and in 2002 he joined as an instructor at the Naval Academy. In 2003 he became the theological adviser of the Bishop of Copenhagen, Erik Norman Svendsen.

== Bishop ==
After the retirement of Erik Norman Svendsen as Bishop of Copenhagen in 2009, Skov-Jakobsen was chosen as one of the six candidates. He lost the first round to the Secretary General of Kirkefondet Kaj Bollmann who got 257 votes against Skov-Jakobsen's 214. In the second round of elections only Skov-Jakobsen and Bollmann remained. Skov-Jakobsen got 608 votes against Kaj Bollmanns 353 votes. He was installed as Bishop of Copenhagen on 31 August 2009 in the Cathedral of Our Lady in Copenhagen as the sixth bishop since the diocese was established in 1922. On 1 January 2010 he became a Knight of the Order of the Dannebrog.
