= Diocese of Copenhagen =

Diocese of Copenhagen Københavns Stift
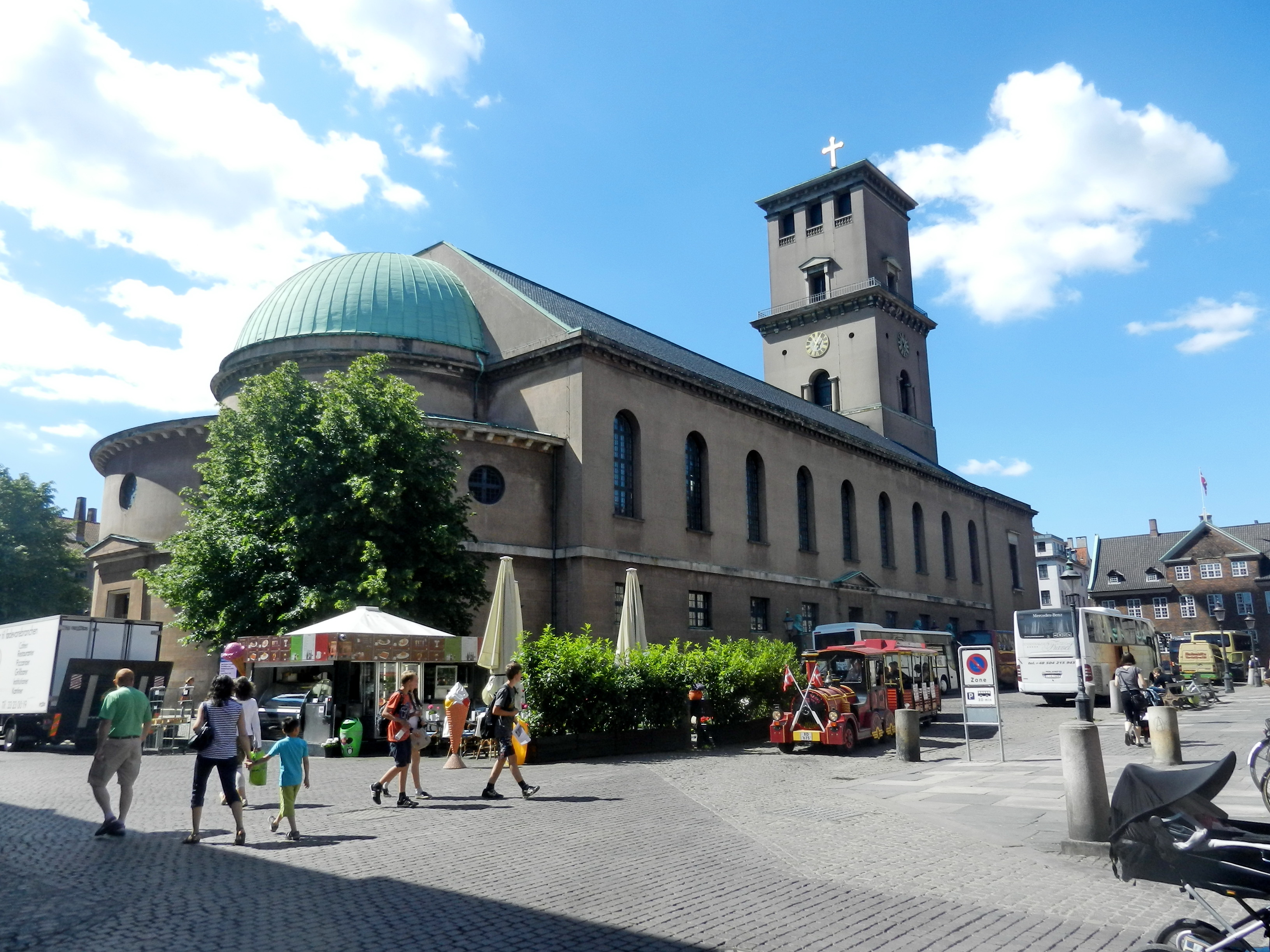
- The Cathedral of Copenhagen

Location
- Country: Denmark

Statistics
- Population: Total: 805,589
- Members: 467,632 (58.1%)

Information
- Denomination: Church of Denmark
- Established: 1 December 1922
- Cathedral: Cathedral of Our Lady

Current leadership
- Bishop: Peter Skov-Jakobsen
- Bishops emeritus: Erik Norman Svendsen (1992-2009)

Website
- Website of the Diocese

The Diocese of Copenhagen (Danish: Københavns Stift) is a diocese within the Evangelical Lutheran Church of Denmark. The Bishop of Copenhagen is currently Peter Skov-Jakobsen, who replaced Erik Normann Svendsen in 2009. The main cathedral of the diocese is the Church of Our Lady in Copenhagen.

The Bishop of Copenhagen has a special status as primus inter pares among the Danish bishops, but does not bear the title "archbishop" because he does not hold Metropolitan status. The Bishop of Zealand formerly held this title until the Diocese of Copenhagen was created in 1922. Though the bishop acts as the main authority among other bishops, the supreme authority of the church rests with The King of Denmark, while the administrative head is the Minister for Ecclesiastical Affairs.

The Diocese of Copenhagen was formed in 1922 when the Diocese of Zealand was divided into two, the other portion forming the Diocese of Roskilde. The diocese was further split in 1961, when the Diocese of Helsingør disjoined.

== List of Bishops ==
- Harald Ostenfeld, 1922–1934
- Hans Fuglsang Damgaard, 1934–1960
- Willy Westergaard Madsen, 1960–1975
- Ole Bertelsen, 1975–1992
- Erik Norman Svendsen, 1992–2009
- Peter Skov-Jakobsen, 2009–present

== See also ==
- Bispegården, Copenhagen
- List of churches in Copenhagen
- List of Lutheran dioceses and archdioceses
