= St. Luke's Church, Copenhagen =

St. Luke's Church
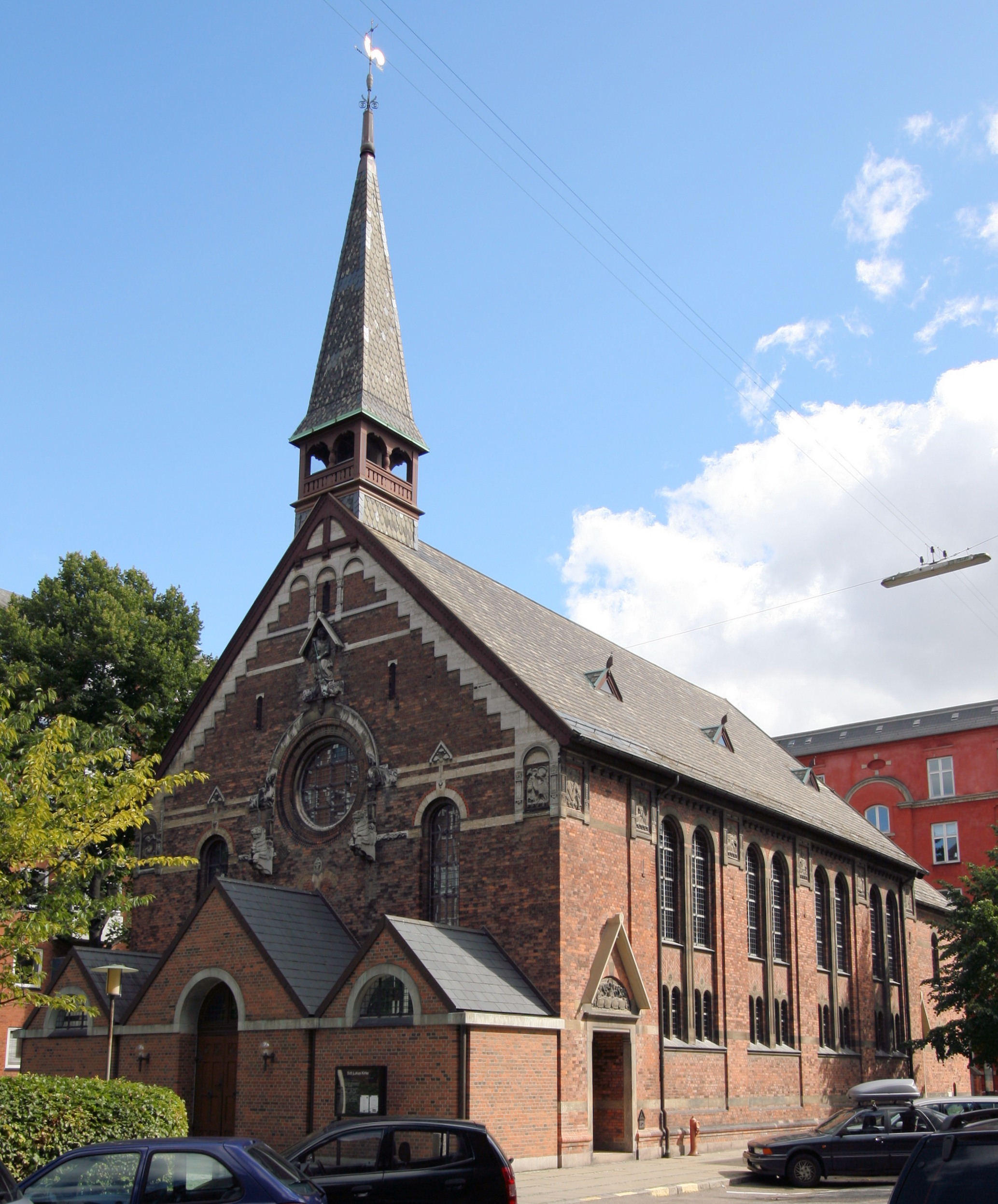
- St. Luke's Church
- St. Luke's Church
- 55°40′56.3″N 12°32′11″E
- Location: 1A Christian Richardts Vej; Frederiksberg, Copenhagen
- Country: Denmark
- Denomination: Church of Denmark
- Website: www.sct-lukas-kirke.dk (in Danish)

History
- Status: Church

Architecture
- Architect: Valdemar Koch
- Architectural type: Church
- Style: Neo-Romanesque
- Groundbreaking: 26 April 1896
- Completed: 29 May 1897
- Construction cost: DKK 75–80,000

Specifications
- Materials: Brick

Administration
- Archdiocese: Diocese of Copenhagen

St. Luke's Church (Danish: Sankt Lukas Kirke) is a Church of Denmark church located in the Frederiksberg district of Copenhagen, Denmark. Completed in 1897 to the design of Valdemar Koch, who also built several other churches in Copenhagen around that time, it is the second-oldest church in Frederiksberg.

== History ==
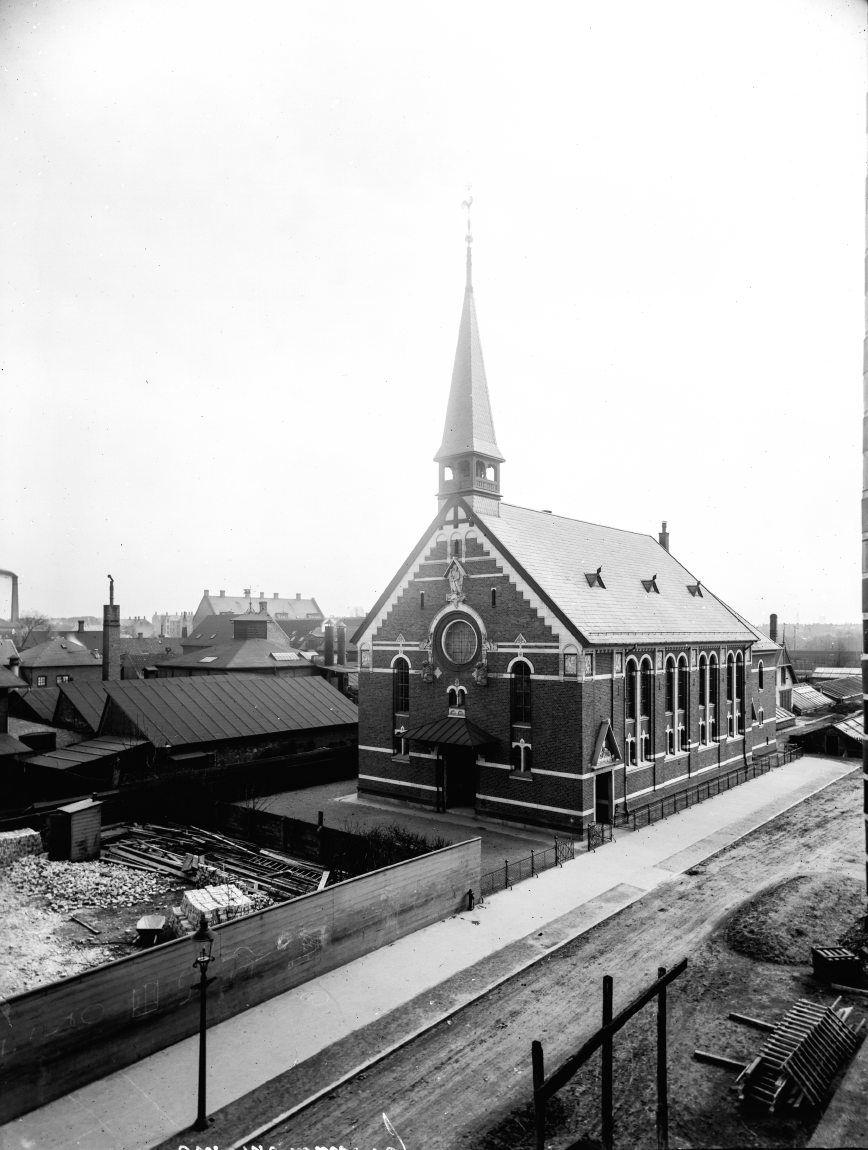
St. Luke's Church photographed by Frederik Riise

By the late 19th century, the population of Frederiksberg parish had grown to about 60,000 inhabitants. In 1892, a temporary church was therefore consecrated in the former gym hall of a local folk high school to relieve the pressure on Frederiksberg Church and the young Harald Ostenfeld, later Bishop of Zealand, was instituted as its first pastor.

At the same time it was decided to divide Frederiksberg into four parishes with St. Luke’s Church as the first of the three new churches to be built. The architect Valdemar Koch was charged with the commission. He had already designed two churches in Copenhagen, Kapernaum Church in Nørrebro and Zion's Church in Østerbro.

Ground was broken on 26 April 1896 and the new church was consecrated on 29 May 1897 with Ostenfeld as pastor. The construction costs amounted to DKK 75–80,000.

The church was expanded with a porch in 1964 which was replaced in 1995 by one designed by the firm Per Gents.

== Architecture ==
St. Luke's is built in Neo-Romanesque style. It stands on a granite plinth, and is built in red brick with ornamental bands. The reliefs and sculptures by Thomas Bærentzen are in light-coloured stone. There is a flèche at the west end of the building.

== Interior ==
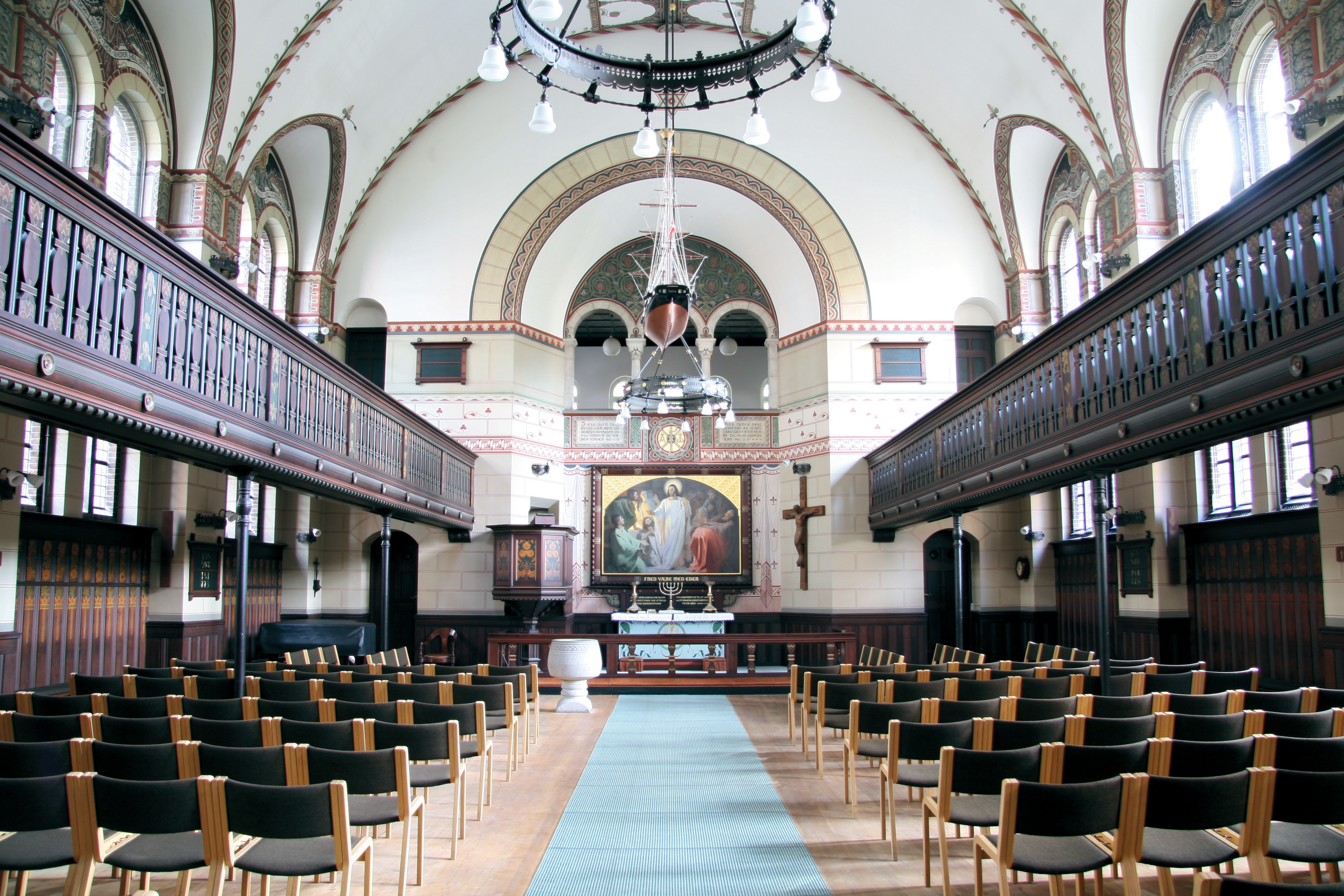
The interior

The barrel vaulted interior opens into an arcade leading to the sacristy at the eastern end.

The rich interior decorations are partly made to Koch's own design and include "paradise flowers" which can be found in all of Koch’s churches in Copenhagen.

Other decorations include a repetition of Joakim Skovgaard’s annunciation scene from Church of the Holy Ghost around the entrance doors, as well as a relief by Thomas Bærentzen entitled The Suffering Mankind. On the walls above the windows there are fluttering angels and citations from the Gospel of Luke painted by Carl Budtz Møller in 1910.

== Furnishings ==
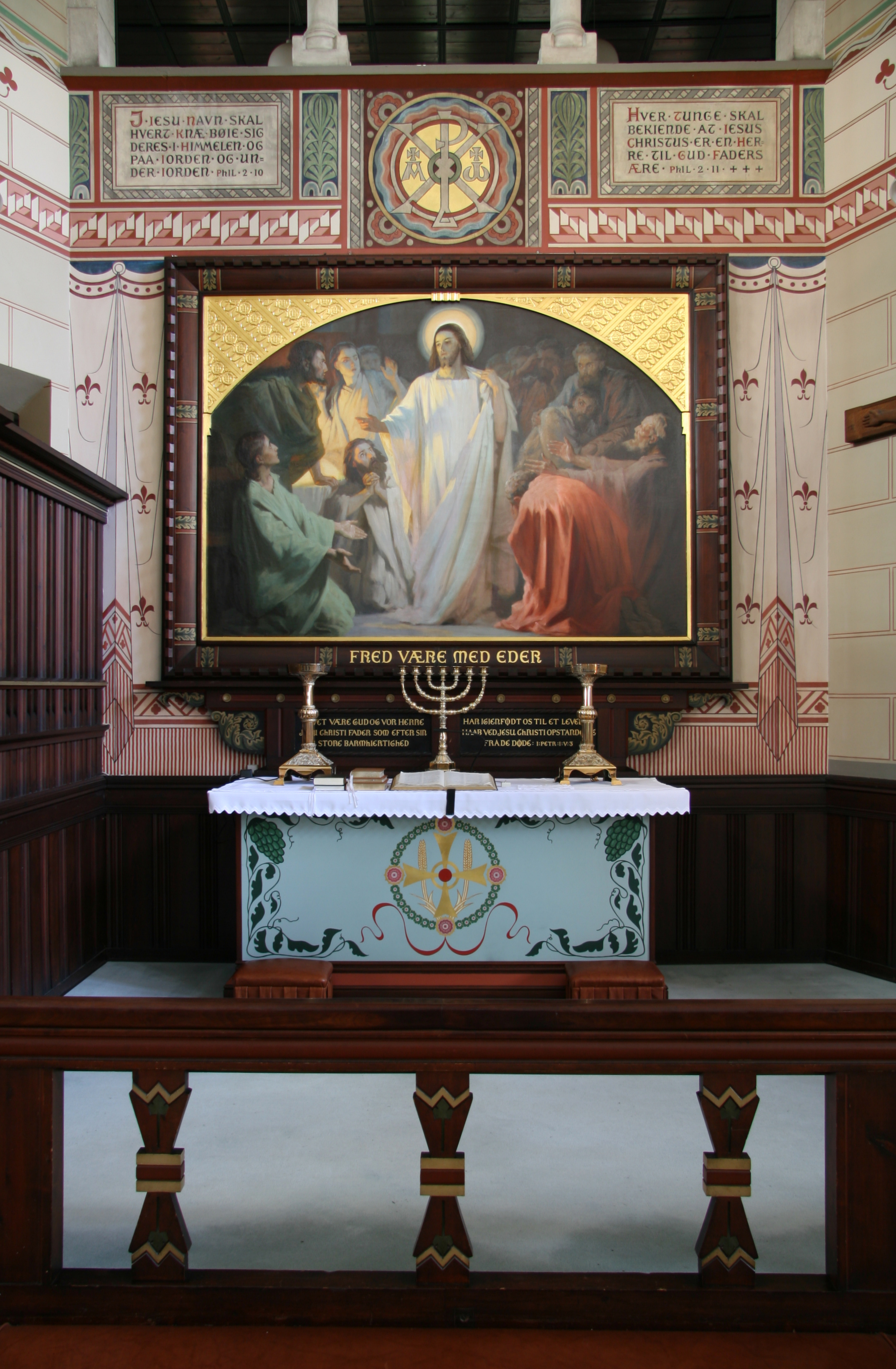
The altarpiece

- The altarpiece is painted by Frans Schwartz and entitled Christ who reveals himself to his disciples.
- The altar table is a reconstruction from 1984 based on old oil paintings and photographs.
- The crucifix to the right of the altarpiece is executed in bog oak by Johannes Kragh and is a donation from 1929.
- The baptismal font is carved in granite from drawings by Valdemar Koch.

== St. Luke's Church today ==
The church is a parish church within the Church of Denmark.

== See also ==
- Church of Christ, Copenhagen
