= Kevin Bendix =

Danish serial entrepreneur

- Born: 2 January 1968 (age 58); Copenhagen, Denmark
- Occupation: serial entrepreneur
- Years active: 2000–present

Kevin Anton Janus Bendix (born 2. January 1968) known professionally as Kevin Bendix is a Danish serial entrepreneur specializing in development of temporary urban culture.

== Early life ==
Bendix grew up in the South Harbour district of Copenhagen, which in the 1970s and 1980s gained a reputation for being the area in Denmark with most people on social welfare, the lowest education rate and life expectancy and high incidence of all major social problems. With a father from Jamaica and a Danish mother, and thefore a darker skin than the majority of Danes, Bendix had to face racism and bullying during his school years, which Bendix claims to have helped him become an indefatigable entrepreneur.

== Professional career ==
In the late 1990s to early 2000s Bendix moved away from working as a television producer in the Danish Broadcasting Corporation to become CEO in an independent TV production company 'Engine' which specialized in creating educational entertainment targeting young people and aiming for having a more serious layout with fewer jump cuts slower pace and more information, than the standard of Danish youth television at the time.

=== Darling aRTbar ===
Bendix ran Café Darling, later known as Darling aRTbar from April 2004 to September 2013, before that, the venue was previously known as Basse and Ohnas Kaffe & Cocktail. The bar was located on Enghave Plads and together with the other local shops suffered from asphyxiation from the building of the Copenhagen Metro City ring. As an Art bar Bendix let artists use the bar as an exhibition hall for free if they chose to donate an art-piece to the art collection. During the art bars existence it featured numerous concerts and poetry readings from the Danish beat poet Claus Høxbroe, Dansk Fløde among others.

=== Restaurants ===
==== Haven ====
Bendix got interested in developing the vacant factory grounds left by the Carlsberg Brewery (today known as the Carlsberg district) in 2010. after the 2008 financial crisis, the area had seen little development. Bendix overtook the lease of the brewery's old leisure Center called 'Haven' (The Garden) and transformed it into an cafe / restaurant with a distinct Danish 1970s dive bar look featuring old styled brown curtains and red checkered tablecloth. Though successful, Haven closed in January 2014 as the temporary lease could not be extended.

==== Vildt & Vin ====
Vildt & Vin (translated Wild and Wine) opened in July 2015 was located on Enghavevej 14, as its name applied it served wild meat like venison and zebra.

==== Øl & Kød ====
Øl & Kød (translated Beer and Beef) is a pop-up bar originally located in the Carlsberg district. Whereas Vildt & Vin was a true restaurant, Øl & Kød was outdoor only featuring grilled exotic meat .

=== BOXLAND ===
In 2013 Bendix joined a collaboration with Carlsberg Byen and formed Boxland Bazaer, a flea market featuring pop-up cafes, urban farming and food court. The BOXLAND Bazar at Carlsberg was the first version of a concept featuring temporary container 'buildings' erected as a village with each container featuring different functions. the concept 'village' has since moved to the former produce market 'Grønttorvet' in Valby
