= Thomas Bærentzen =

Danish sculptor (1869–1936)

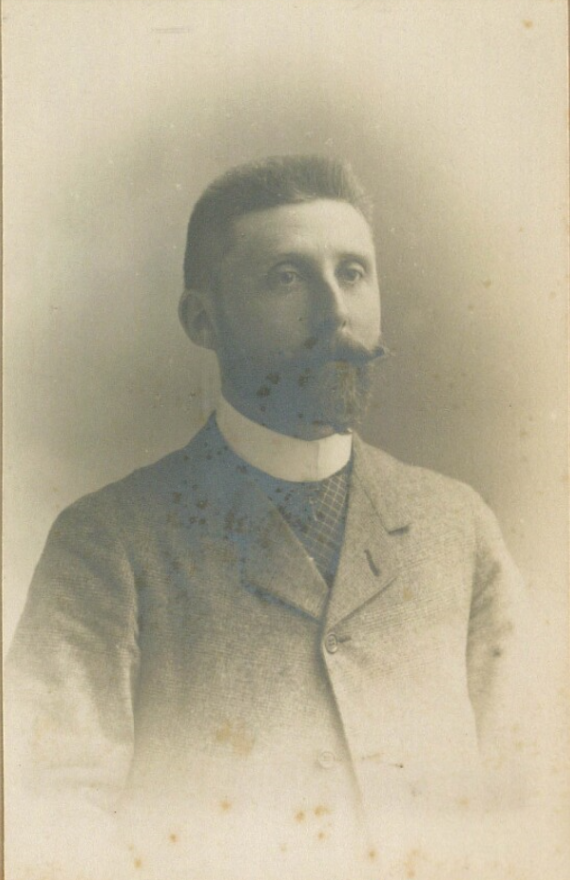
- Born: Thomas Vilhelm Bærentzen; 6 April 1869; Copenhagen, Denmark
- Died: 23 April 1936 (aged 67); Frederiksberg, Denmark
- Known for: Sculpting

Thomas Vilhelm Bærentzen (1869-1936) was a Danish sculptor. He created the large relief above the main entrance of Odense Theatre in Odense, as well as reliefs on a number of churches. He was for a while married to the writer Emma Bærentzen in the 1910s.

== Early life and education ==
Bærentzen was born in Copenhagen, the son of a captain and later naval commander and city councillor, Alexander Christian Riber Bærentzen (1830-1920) and Anna Rosa Elise Magnussen (1841-1920).

He studied drawing privately in Frederik Hammeleff's studio. He enrolled at the Royal Danish Academy of Fine Arts in 1887 but left in 1889, and was instead educated privately in Stephan Sinding's studio until 1891. Bærentzen visited Paris together with his teacher and fellow students in 1890. He later made study trips to Greece, Spain, Turkey, North Africa and Italy, where he lived from 1821 to 1925.

== Career ==
Bærentzen was, for the first time, represented at the Charlottenborg Spring Exhibition in 1889. He was later also represented at exhibitions in Rome, Malmö and Paris. He was a secretary for Selskabet for dekorativ kunst og udstilling af Skønvirke from 1905 to 1910 and president of the Scandinavian Society in Rome for about a year.

He created the large relief above the main entrance to Odense Theatre and has also created reliefs for a number of churches in Copenhagen and Odense. He also created a large number of statuettes and portrait busts.

He received awards from the Art Academy in 1902 and 1903 and Det Ancherske Legat in 1911.

== Personal life ==
Bærentzen married twice. His first wife was the writer Emma Bærentzen. They married on 19 March 1913 in the Church of the Holy Ghost in Copenhagen but divorced in 1917. He then married Johanne Bay (1878-1973) in 1924.

Bærentzen died on 23 April 1936. He is buried in Herfølge Cemetery but his grave has been removed.

== Selected works ==
- Zion's Church, Copenhagen
- Christ Church, Copenhagen
- Nazareth Church, Copenhagen
- St. Luke's Church, Copenhagen
- St. Andrew's Church, Copenhagen
- Ansgar's Church, Odense (1901–02).

== Image gallery ==
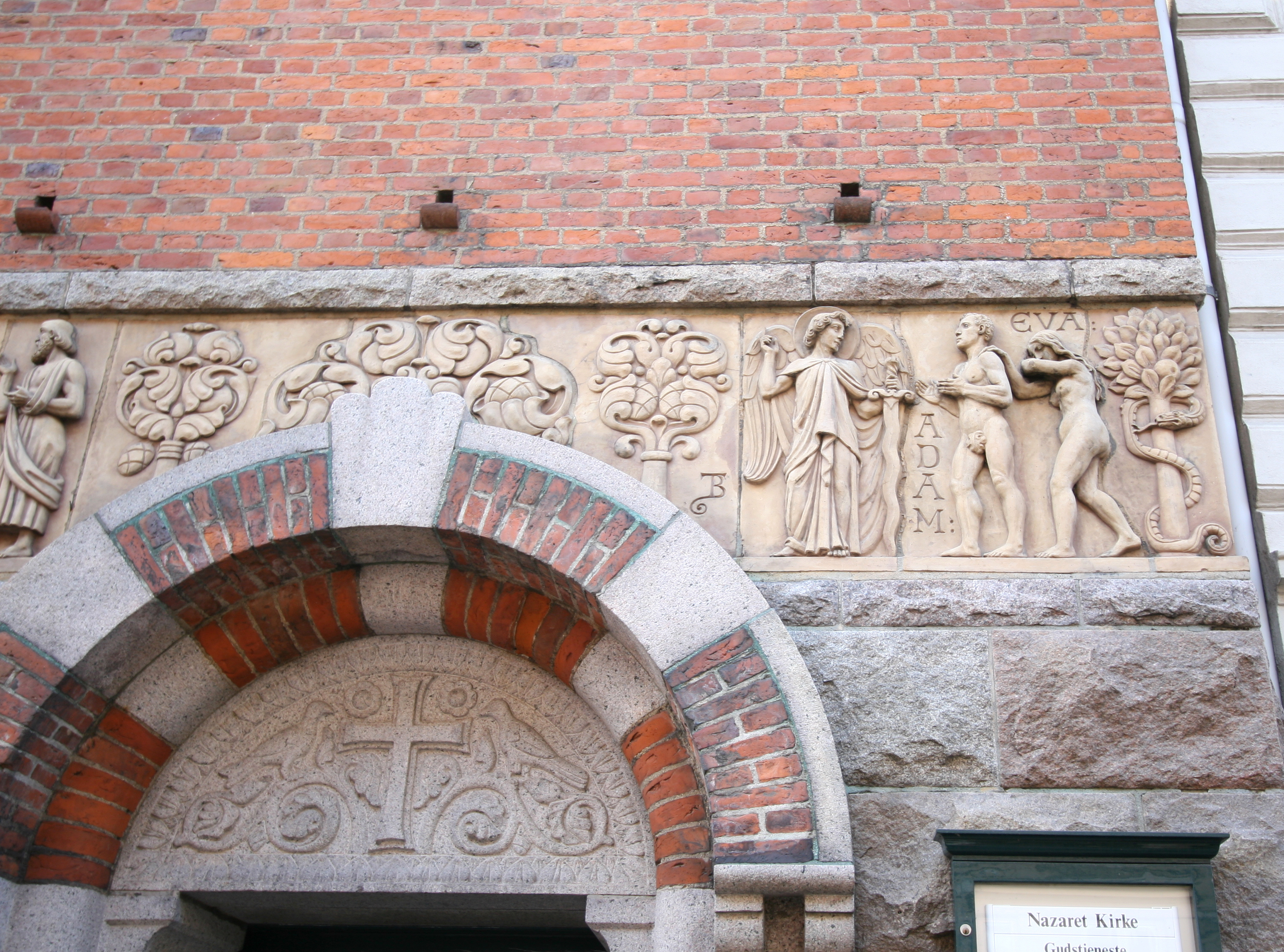
Relief on St. Andrew's Church

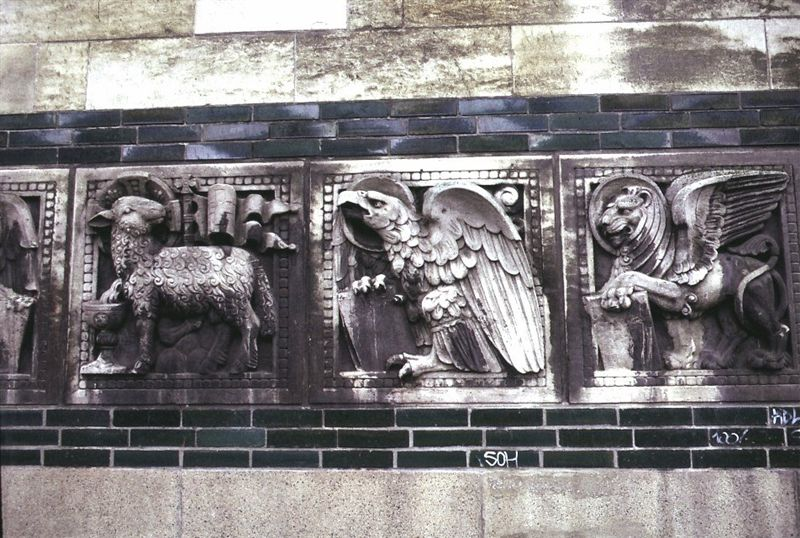
Relief on Christ Church, Copenhagen
