= Capernaum Church, Copenhagen =

Capernaum Church
- Kapernaumskirken
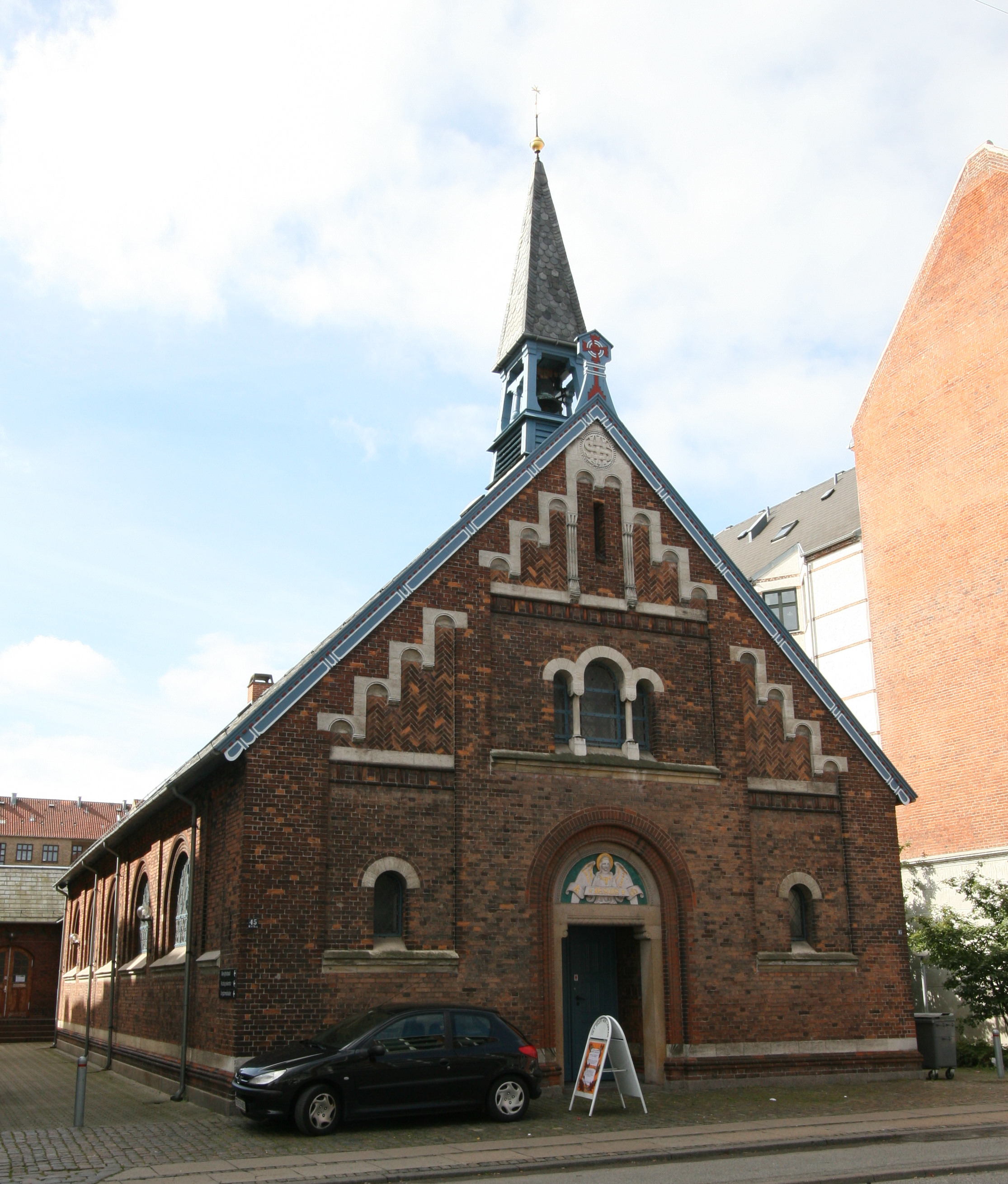
- Capernaum Church
- 55.702781°N 12.530679°E
- Location: Frederikssundsvej 45; 2400 København NV, Copenhagen
- Country: Denmark
- Denomination: Church of Denmark
- Website: https://www.kapernaumskirken.dk

History
- Status: Church

Architecture
- Architect: Valdemar Koch
- Architectural type: Church
- Completed: 1895

Specifications
- Materials: Brick

Administration
- Archdiocese: Diocese of Copenhagen

The Capernaum Church (Danish: Kapernaumskirken) is a Church of Denmark parish church located at Frederikssundsvej 45 in the Nordvest district of Copenhagen, Denmark. Inaugurated in 1895, it is the oldest surviving church built by the Copenhagen Church Foundation.

Constructed in 1895 to designs by Valdemar Koch, the interior of the church was executed in an Art Nouveau style.

== History ==
The church was built at the initiative of the Copenhagen Church Foundation (Kirkefondet). The building was designed by Valdemar Koch and built in 1895. A sacristy, chapel, and church hall were added as an extension to the south-eastern end of the building in 1916.

== Architecture ==
The church is built from red brick and has a saddle roof topped by a ridge turret. Unlike most churches in Denmark, Capernaum Church is not oriented from east to west. Instead, it is laid out so that the entrance faces Frederikssundsvej, on the north-eastern side of the church. The facade facing the street has round-arched windows, a Lombard band, and a relief of an angel above the main entrance.

The interior of the church is barrel vaulted and painted white, with low light-blue paneling. The vaults of the ceiling aredecorated with a skønvirke pattern, which can be compared to the Art Nouveau style. The altar is decorated in a similar style using majolica tiles and a stoneware cross. The pulpit is simpliarly decorated with ornamental plants and animals.

The church's granite baptismal font is carved in a Romanesque style. The pews were added to the church in 1961, and feature carvings made by Hjalte Skovgaard and Foersom Hengdal.

== Parish ==
As of 1 January 2012, the parish had 9,029 inhabitants of which 5,148 (57.02 %) were members of the Church of Denmark.
