= Enghave Plads =

Public square in Copenhagen

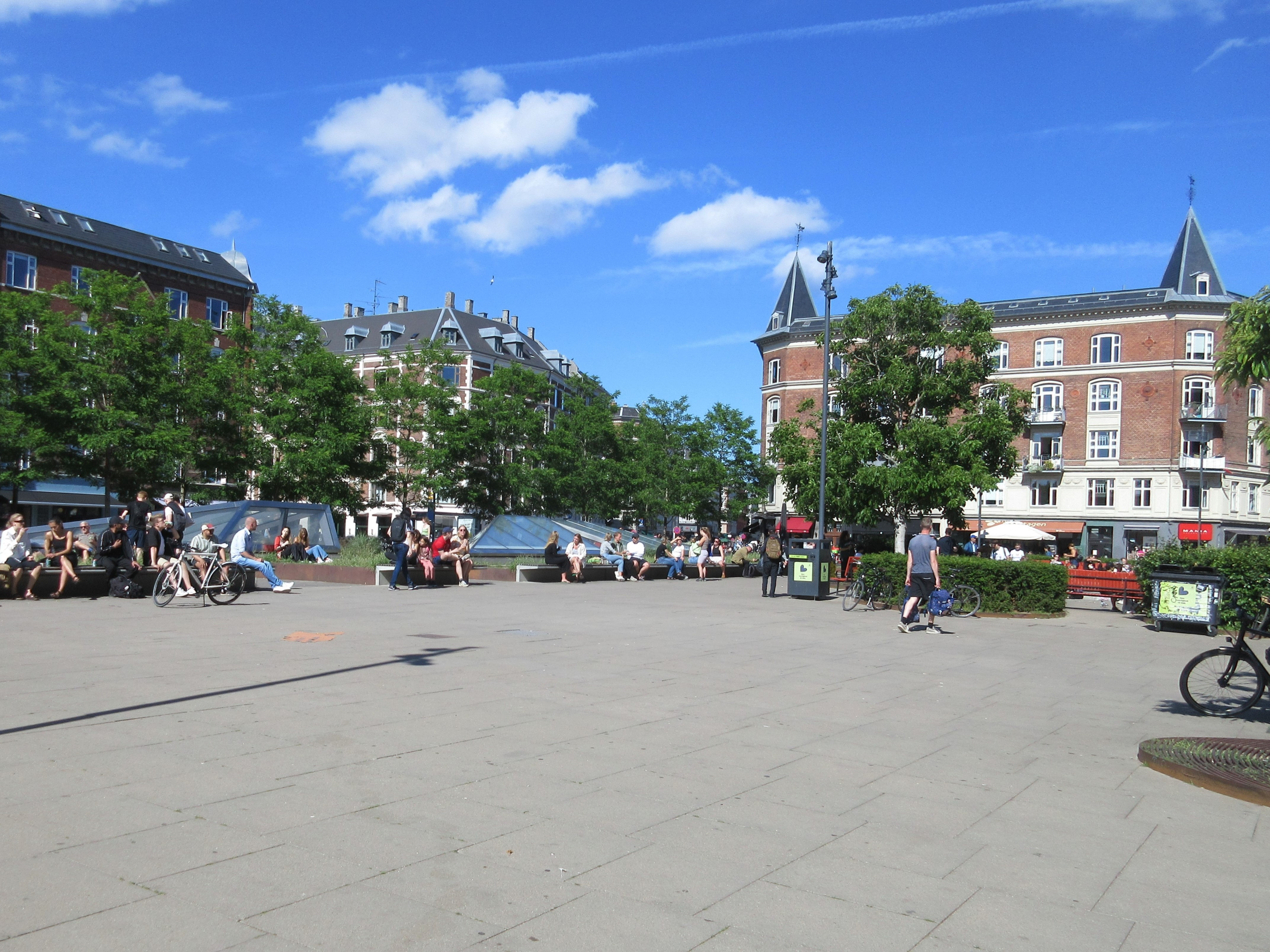
- Enghave Plads in June 2022
- Interactive map of Enghave Plads
- Location: Vesterbro, Copenhagen, Denmark
- Nearest metro station: Enghave Plads Station
- Coordinates: 55°40′1.56″N 12°32′42.72″E

Enghave Plads is a central public square of the Vesterbro district in Copenhagen, Denmark. It is located where Istedgade reaches Enghavevej, which separates the square from Enghave Park.

== History ==
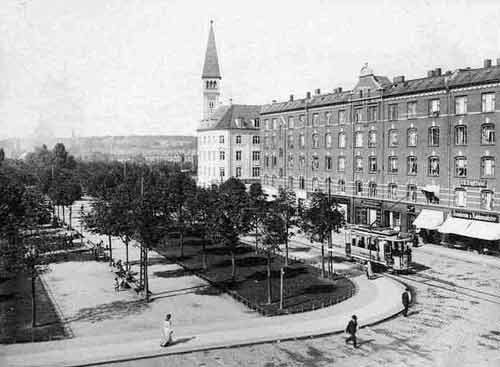
Enghave Plads

Enghave Plads was established when the Vesterbro area was built over in the late 1880s. A playground was established on the site in the late 1880s at the initiative of architect and city council member Ferdinand Meldahl. Enghave Plads School opened on the square in 1892. Christ Church, completed in 1900, was the second church to be built in the rapidly growing Vesterbro neighbourhood. For many years the square played host to an annual fun fair.

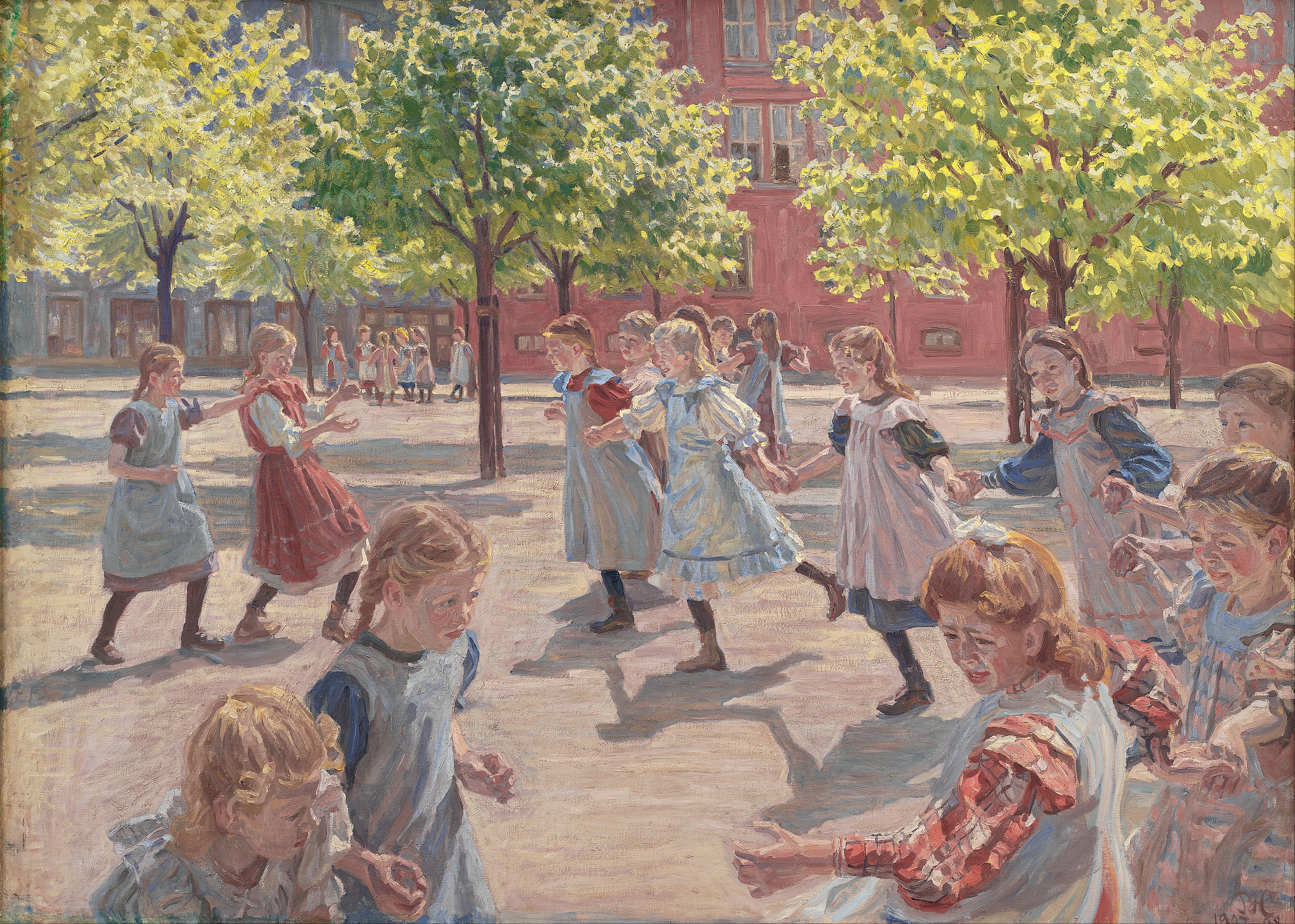
Peter Hansen: Playing children. Enghave Plads (1907)

From its opening in 1902 Enghave Plads was the southern terminus of Line 3 of the Copenhagen Tramways, which operated between Melchiors Plads in Østerbro and the square by way of Nørrebro and Frederiksberg. The tram line was extended to Frederiksholm in 1915 and again from Frederiksholm to Mozarts Plads in 1937.

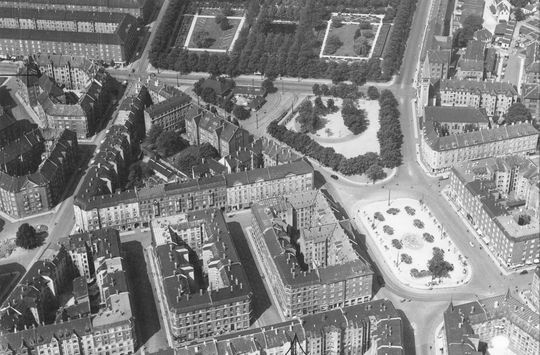
The square seen from the east, c. 1950. A narrow slice of Enghave Park can be seen at the top

The area on the other side of Enghavevej remained open land. The Royal Danish Horticultural Society established 478 allotments at the site. They were moved and the small public Enghave Park was laid out under the direction of City Architect Poul Holsøe, who also designed the red-brick social housing which was built at the same time and borders the park on three sides.

The square was renovated and pedestrianized in 1995. The 114-year-old chestnut tree, which for decades had dominated the square, was removed in October 2011 to make way for the operating of Enghave Plads Station, a station on the City Circle Line.

== Notable buildings and residents ==
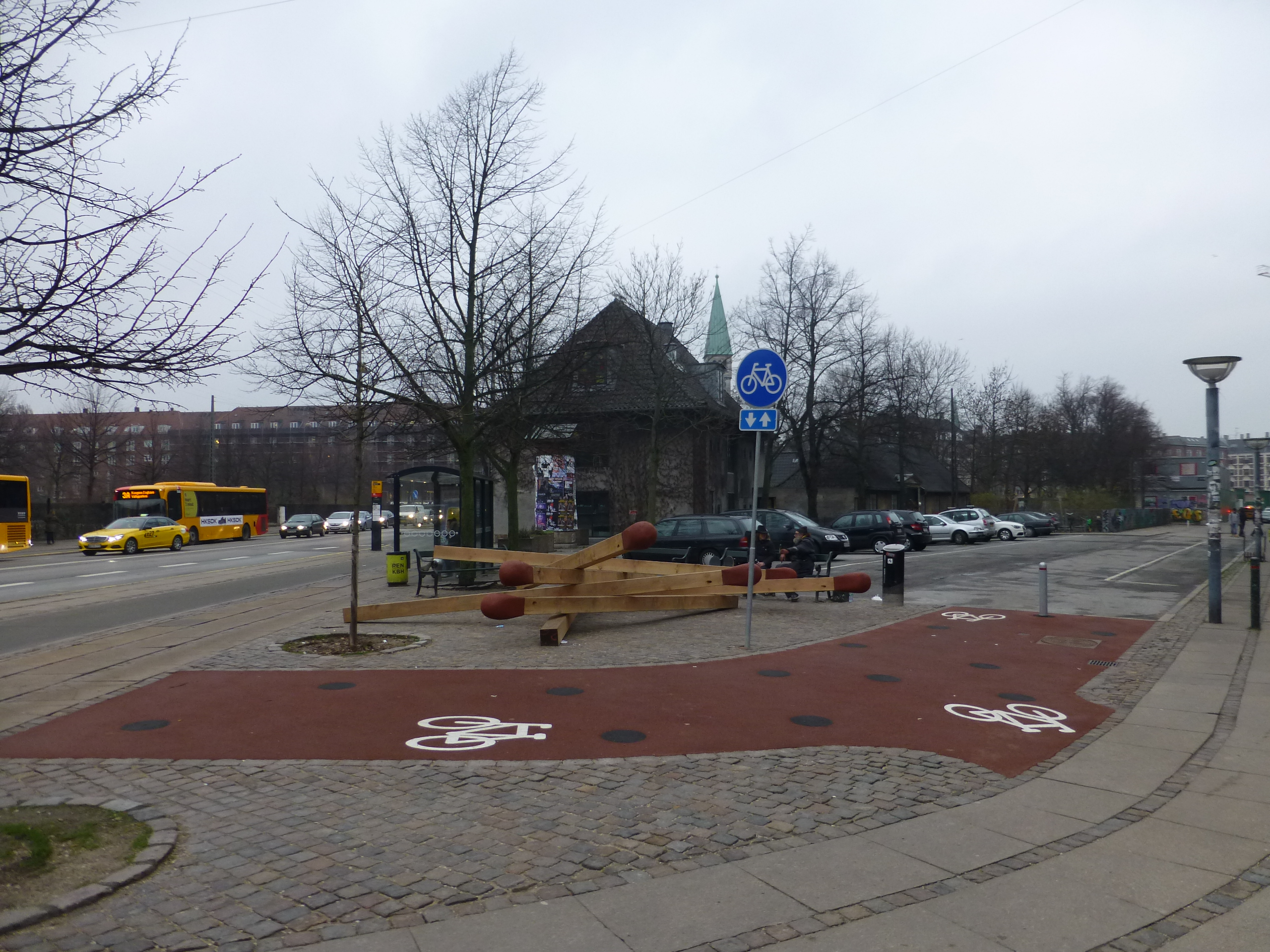
The day care on the corner of Enghave Plads and Enghavevej

After a merger with Mathæusgade School in 2008, Enghave Plads School is now part of Tove Ditlevsen's School. Both buildings were designed by city architect Ludvig Fenger. Christ Church was designed by Valdemar Koch in an Italian style. He also designed the two residential buildings that flank it on both sides. The buildings on the north (Istedgade) side of the square are from 1898 and were designed by Christian Mandrup-Poulsen. Jens Christian Kofoed also contributed to the buildings around the square.

A cluster of low buildings that were formerly used by the tram workers have been converted into a kindergarten.

== Public art ==
Boy with fiasco, a fountain designed by Jens Lund, was installed in the centre of the square in 1903.

== Gallery ==
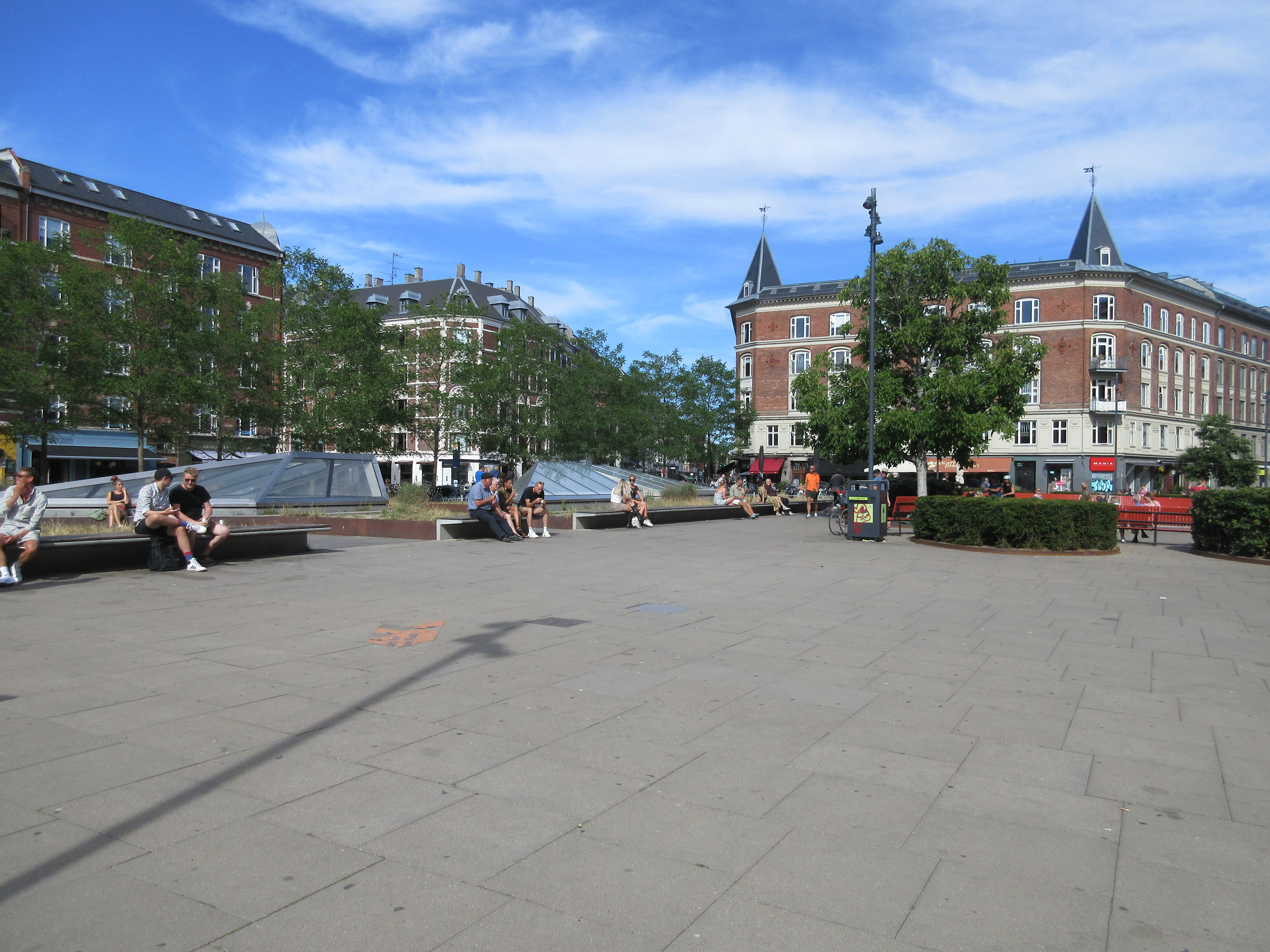

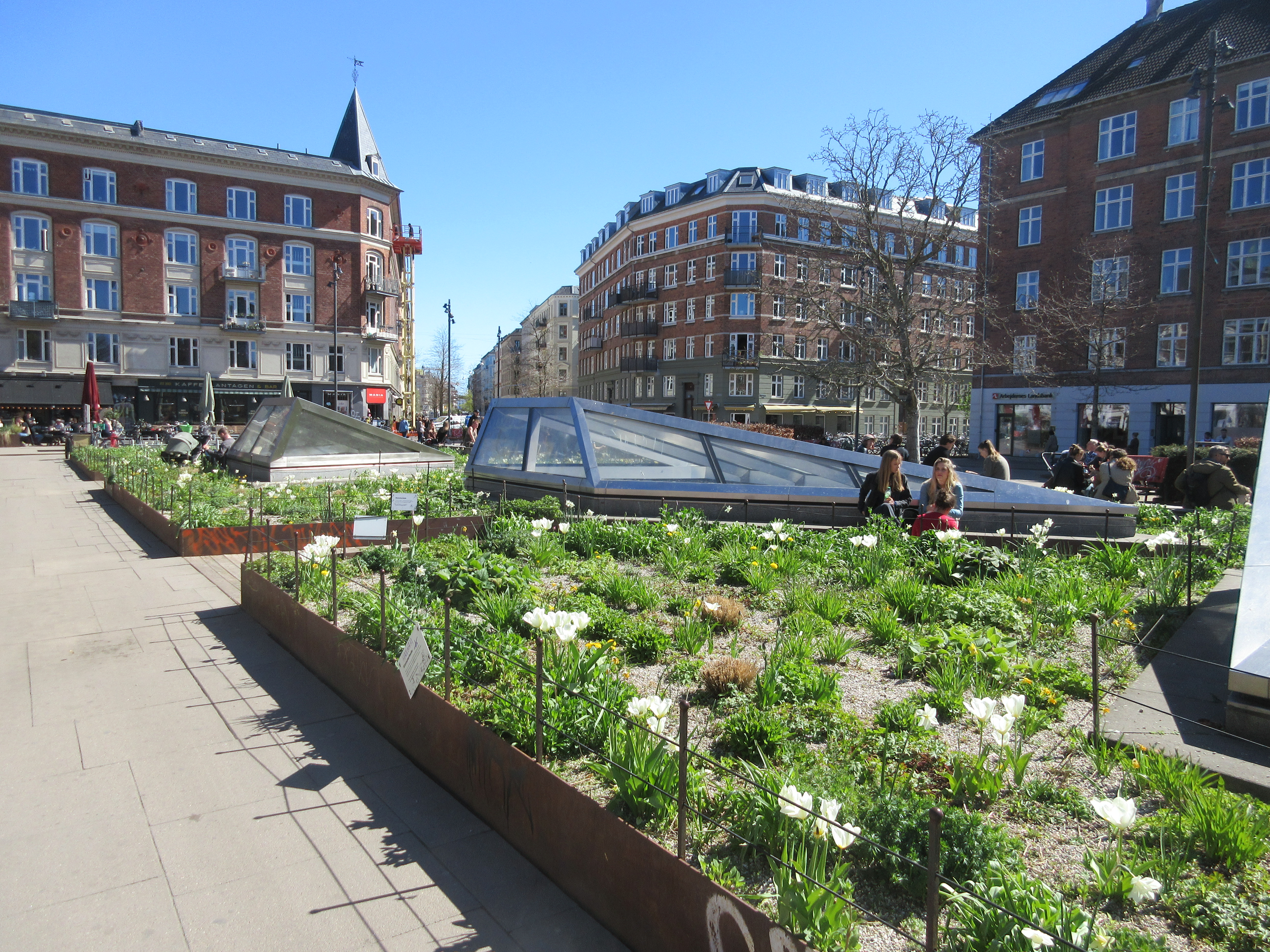
The skylights of the metro station,

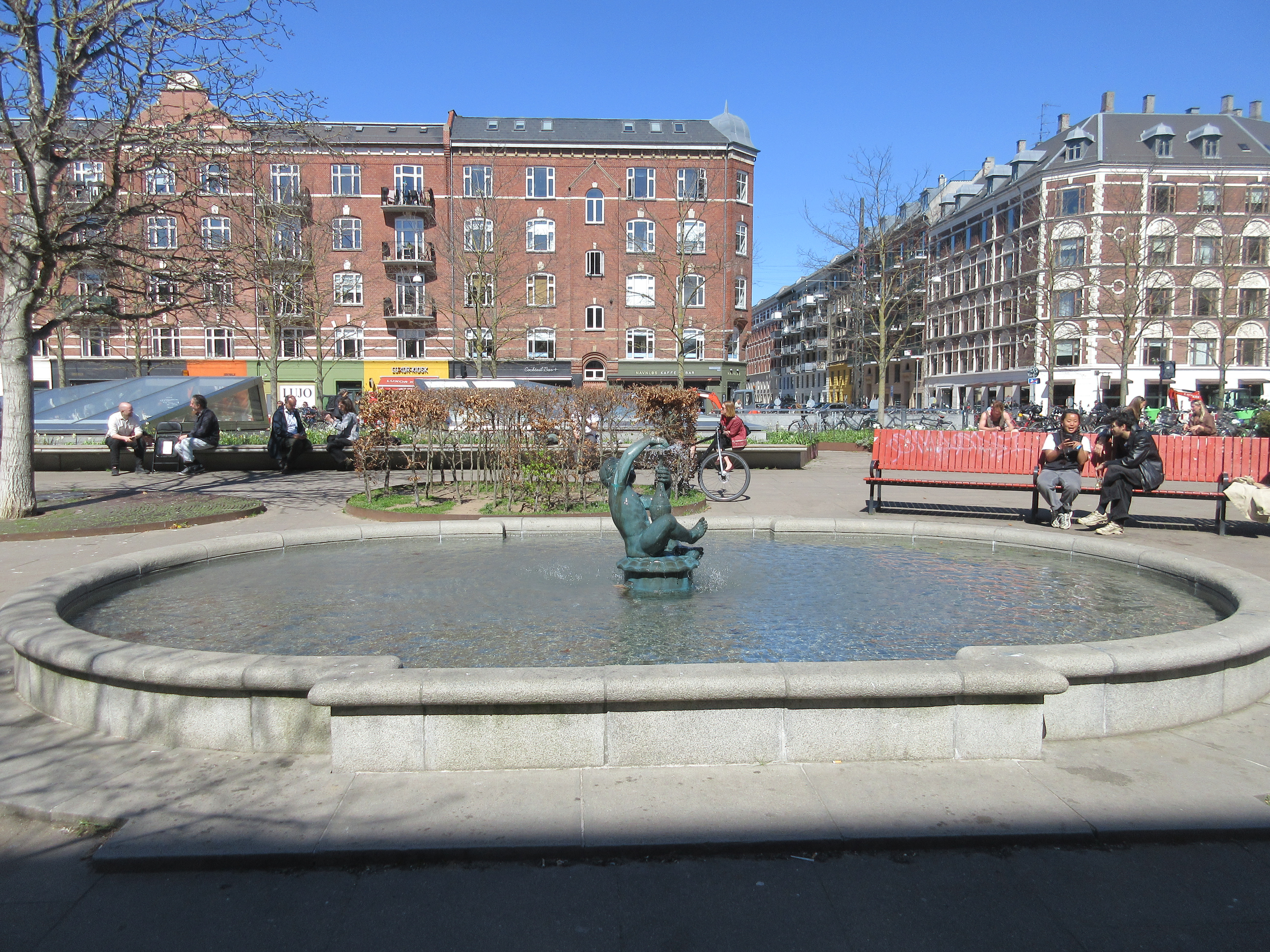
The fountain.
