= Apostle Church =

Church building in Copenhagen Municipality, Denmark

Coordinates: 55.6719°N 12.5511°E

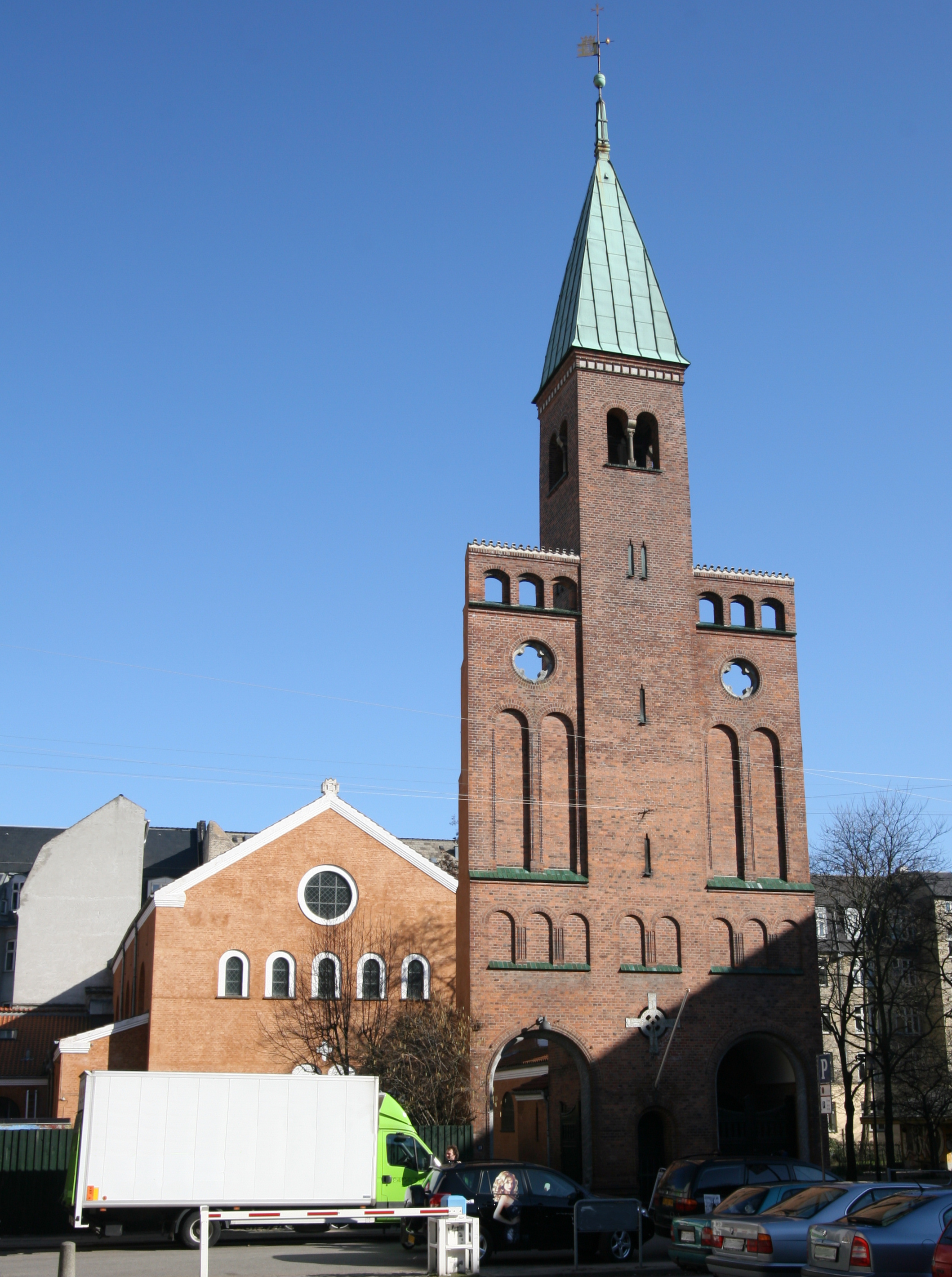
Apostle Church

The Apostle Church (Danish: Apostelkirken) is a church building of the Church of Denmark in the Vesterbro district of Copenhagen. It was built in 1901 by architect Valdemar Koch.

== Sources ==
- http://www.nordenskirker.dk/Tidligere/Apostel_kirke/Apostel_kirke.htm
- http://www.korttilkirken.dk/kirkerA/apostel.htm
