= Valdemar Koch =

Danish architect and politician

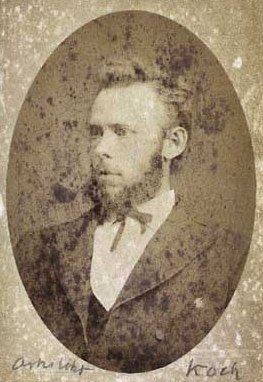
- Valdemar Koch
- Born: 20 October 1852; Sønder Kirkeby, Denmark
- Died: 24 February 1902 (aged 49); Copenhagen, Denmark
- Occupation: Architect

Signature
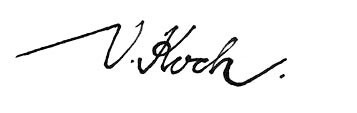

Otto Valdemar Koch (20 October 1852 – 24 February 1902) was a Danish architect and local politician. He designed a number of churches in Copenhagen.

== Early life and education ==
Valdemar Koch was born in the parish of Sønder Kirkeby on the island of Falster, Denmark. His parents were pastor Hans Peter Gyllembourg Koch (1807–1883) and his second wife Anna Oline F. Parelius (1823–1861).

In 1871, he joined the drawing school of C. V. Nielsen. He was then admitted to the Royal Danish Academy of Fine Arts from which he graduated in 1879. The following year, he travelled to Germany and Italy, which he repeated in 1883, 1885 and 1886.

== Career ==
Koch initially worked as a draughtsman for Ludvig Fenger and Hermann Baagøe Storck. He participated independently in the competition for the new Copenhagen City Hall which was held in early 1889. Despite support from the influential Ferdinand Meldahl he failed to win but later admitted that Martin Nyrop's winning proposal was more modern. Instead he entered local politics in Copenhagen, where he was a member of the City Council from 1891 to 1897. As an architect, Koch specialised in the design of churches. In 1896 he also surveyed the limestone churches in the area around Grenå.

Valdemar Koch received the Eckersberg Medal in 1898 and 1900. Koch exhibited at the Exposition Universelle (1900) at which he won the Grand Prix. Koch also designed a memorial to Svend at Grathe Heath in Jutland (1892) and another one to Canute Lavard at Haraldsted just north of Ringsted on central Zealand (1902).

== Style ==
Koch belonged to Johan Daniel Herholdt's Italian-Danish school as opposed to Ferdinand Meldahl's more internationally inclined, "European" school. His work demonstrates a thorough knowledge of architectural archaeology and history with Romanesque architecture as his main source of inspiration. The Church of Christ in the Vesterbro district of Copenhagen is an example of the Italian inspiration while the use of red brick in the interior of the Apostle Church demonstrates Danish influence.

== Personal life ==
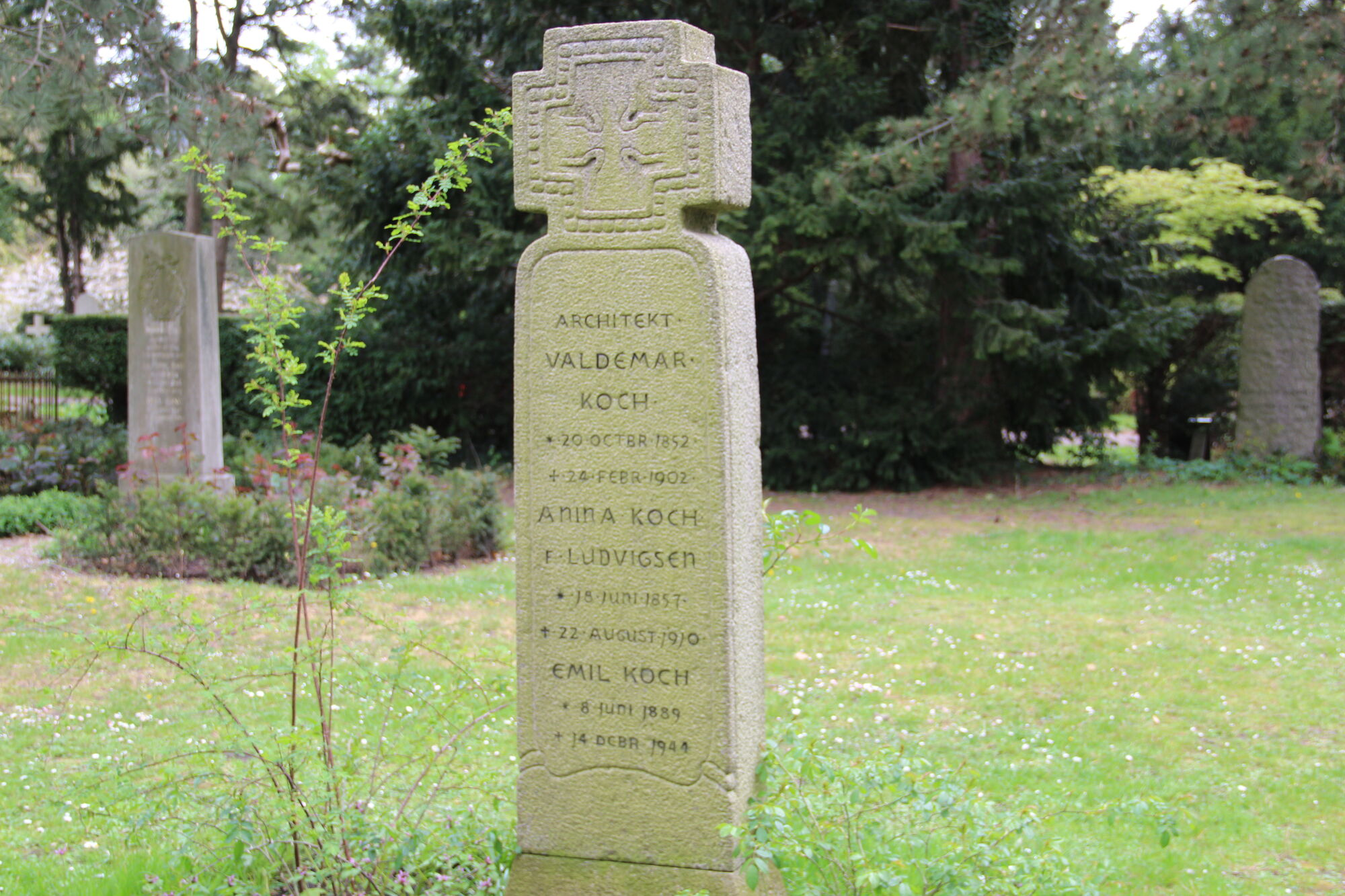
Joch's timbstone in Copenhagen's Western Cemetery.

Koch was married to Anina Jensine Ludvigsen (1857–1910), daughter of Berthel Reinholdt Ludvigsen (1814–1879) and Sophie Louise Stoltze (1824–1869). They had one son, Knud Christian Koch (1888–1952).

Koch died on 24 February 1902. He is buried in Copenhagen's Vestre Cemetery.

== Selected works ==
- Capernaum Church, Nørrebro, Copenhagen (1896)
- Zion's Church, Østerbro, Copenhagen (1896)
- St. Luke's Church, Frederiksberg, Copenhagen (1897)
- Church of Christ, Vesterbro, Copenhagen (1900)
- Apostle Church, Vesterbro, Copenhagen (1901)
- Reersø Church, Kalundborg Municipality, Denmark (1904)
- Church of Our Saviour, Vejle, Denmark (1904)

== Gallery ==
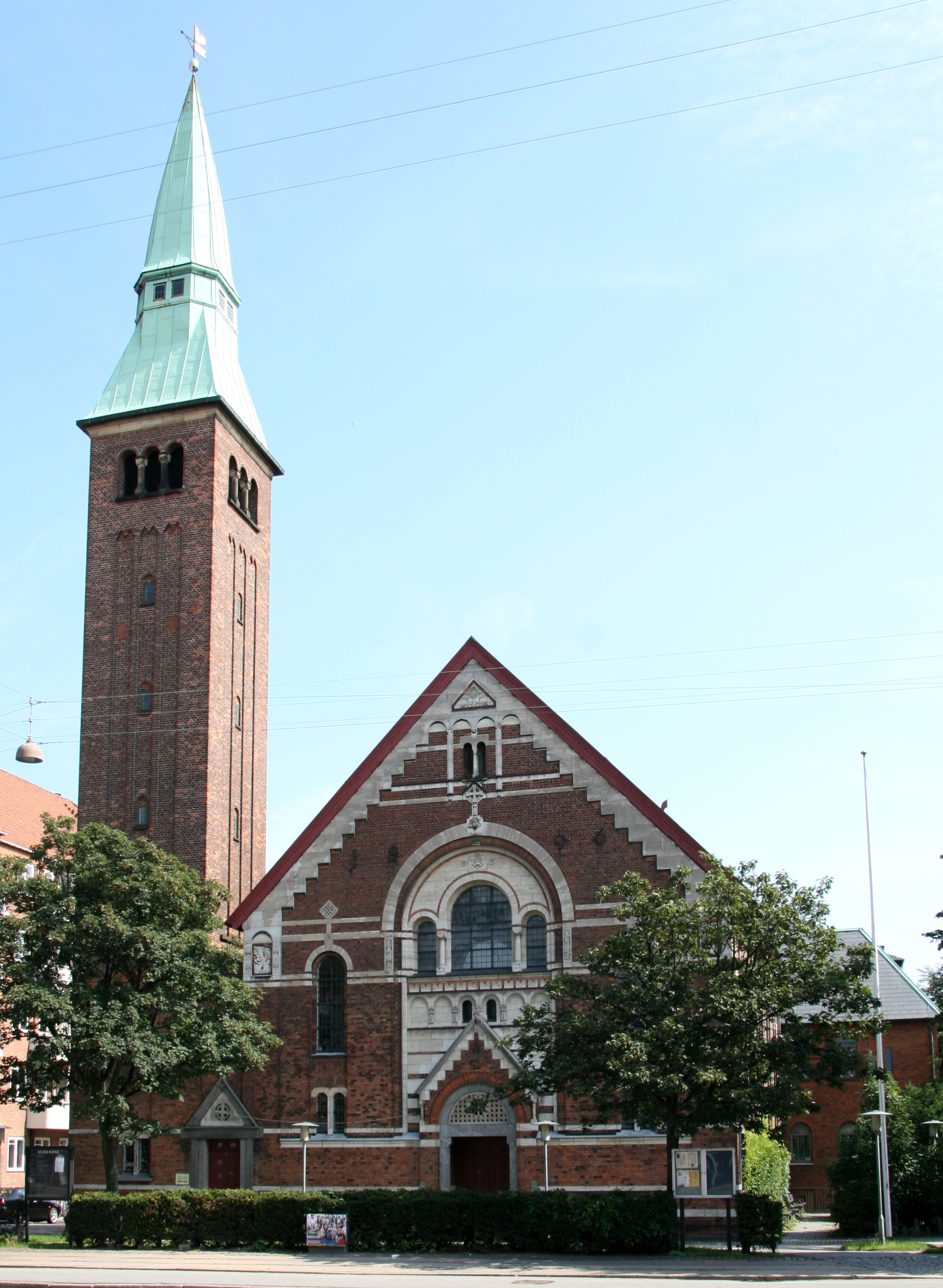
Zion's Church
(1896)

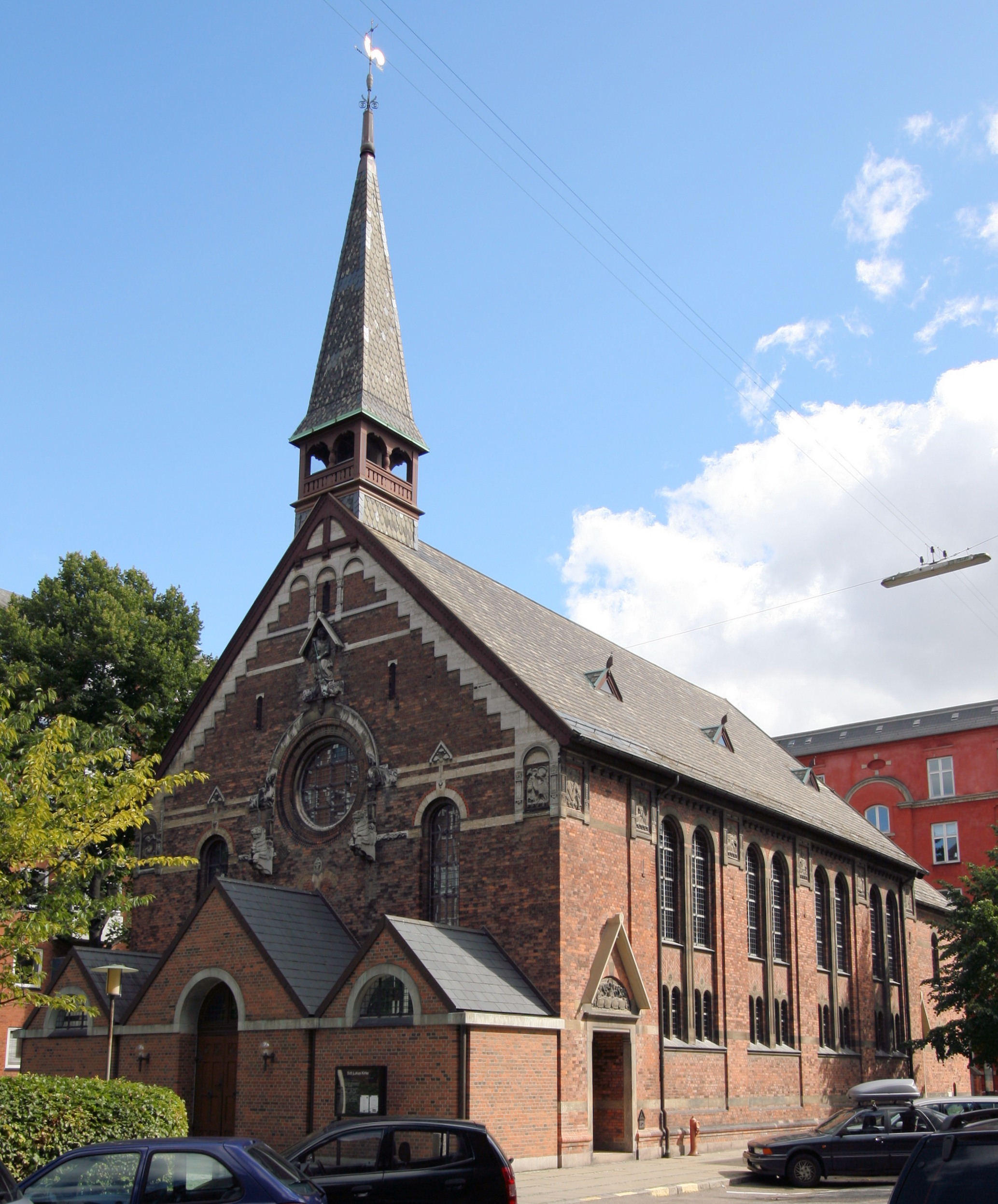
St. Luke's Church
(1897)

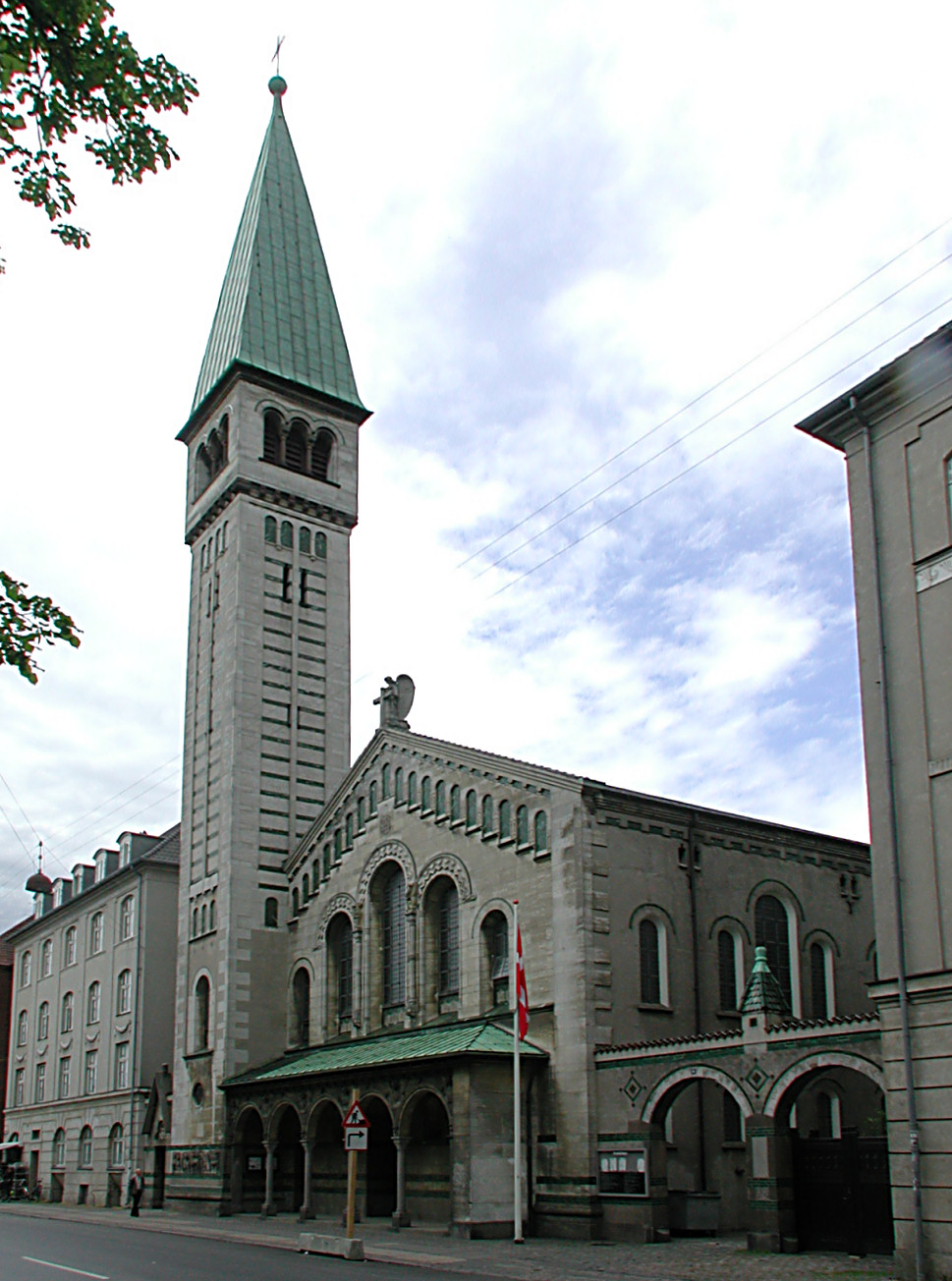
Christ Church, Copenhyagen

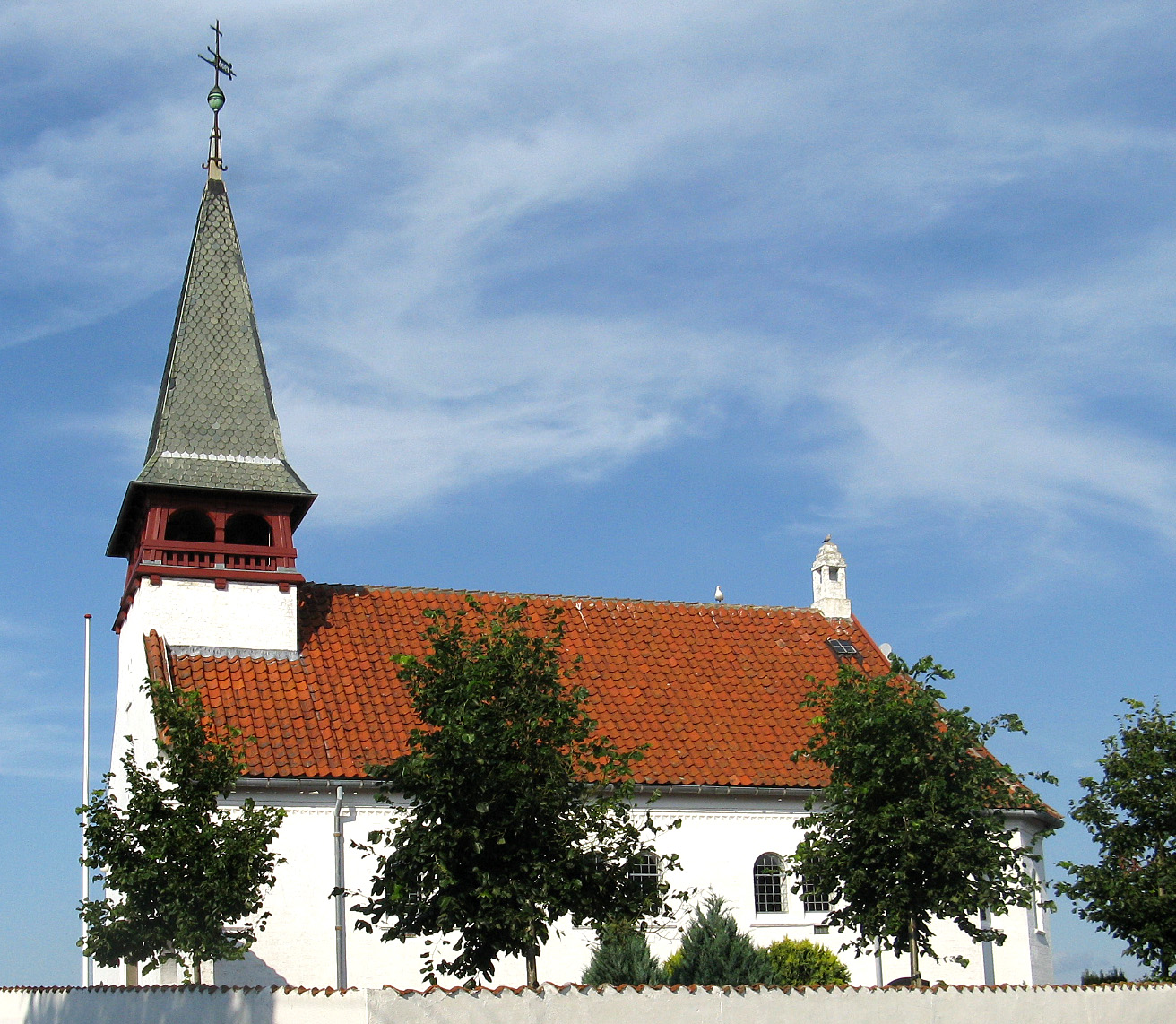
Reersø Church
(1904)

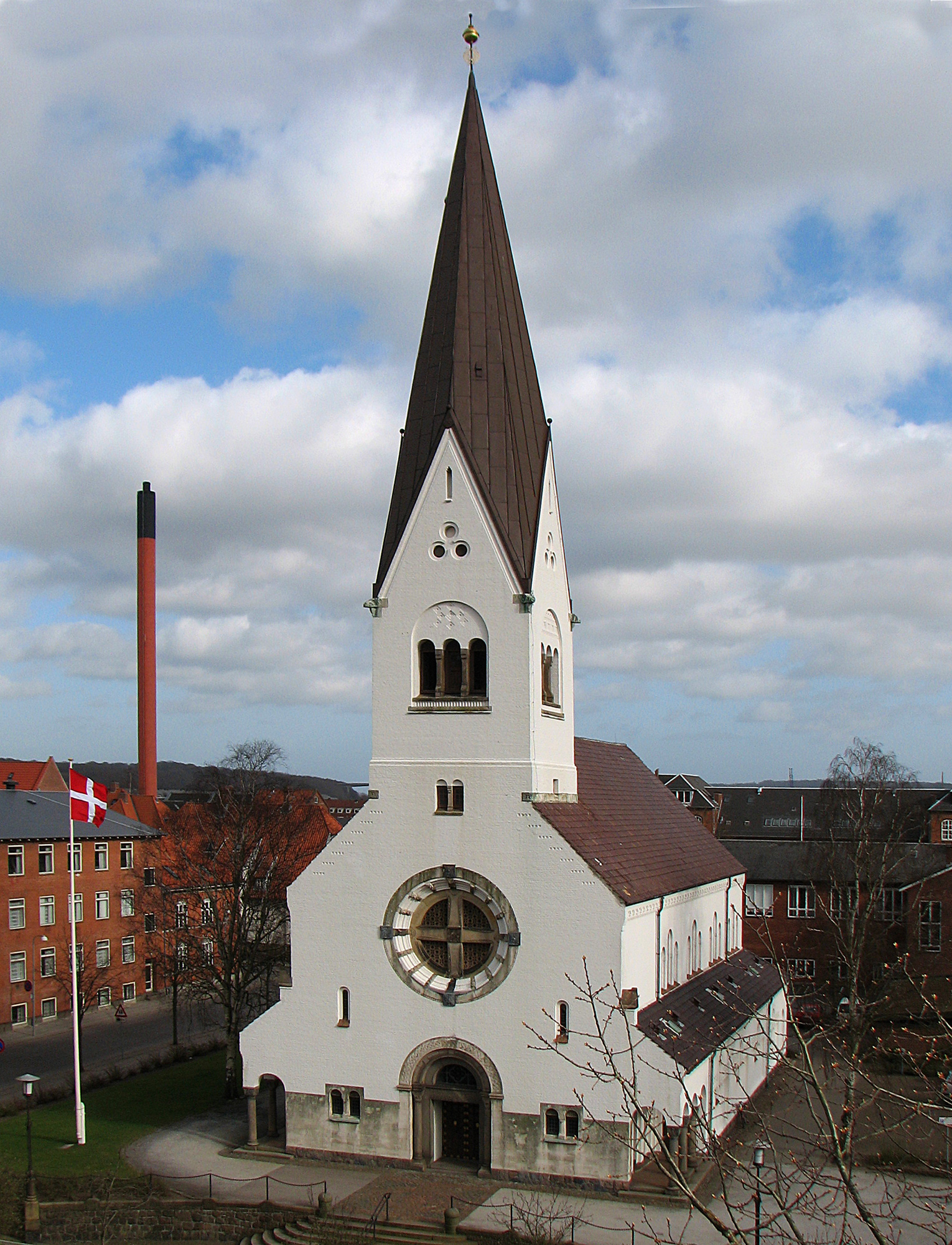
Church of Our Saviour, Vejle
(1907)

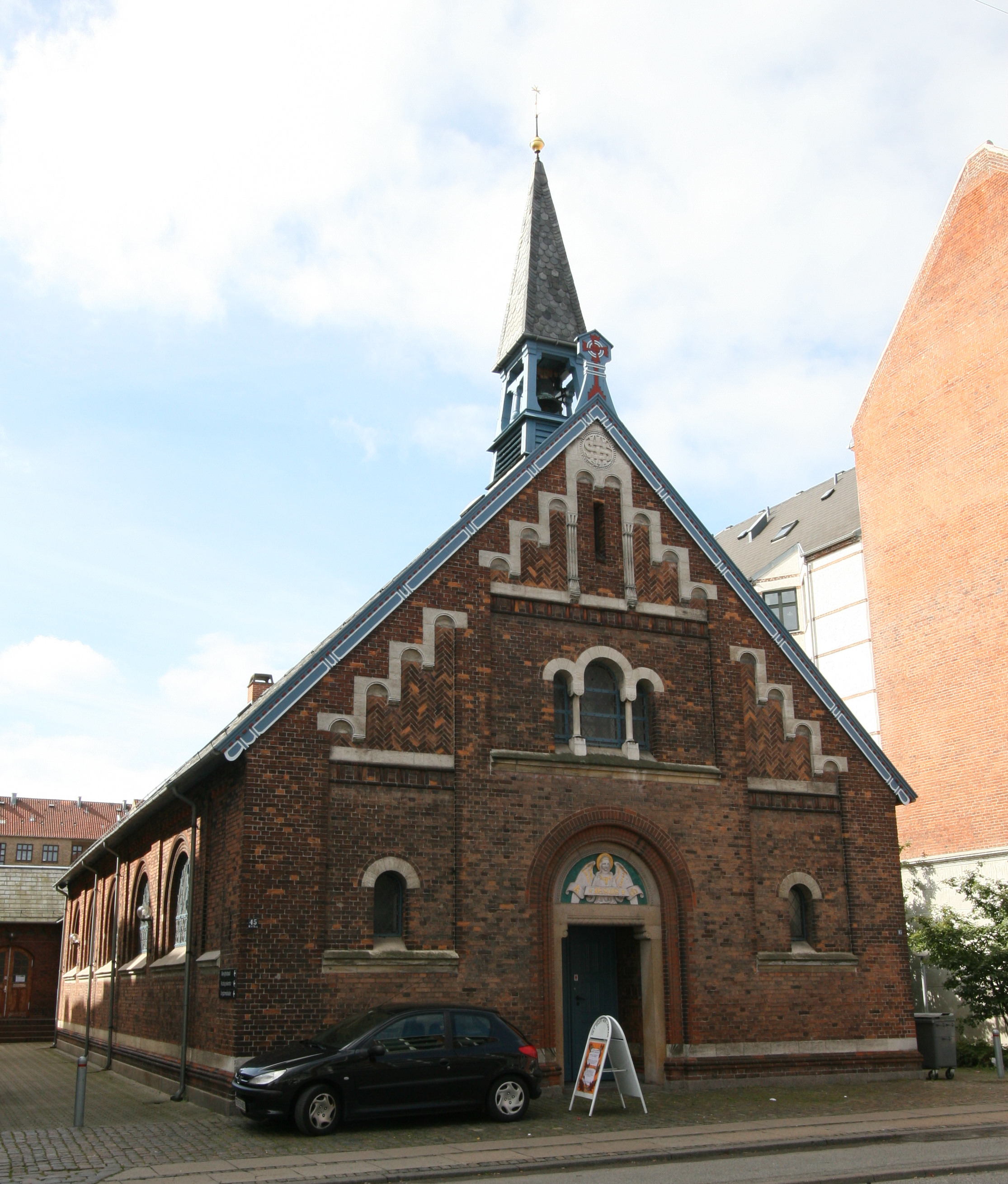
Kapernaum Church, Copenhagen
(1895)
