= Christ Church, Copenhagen =

Christ Church
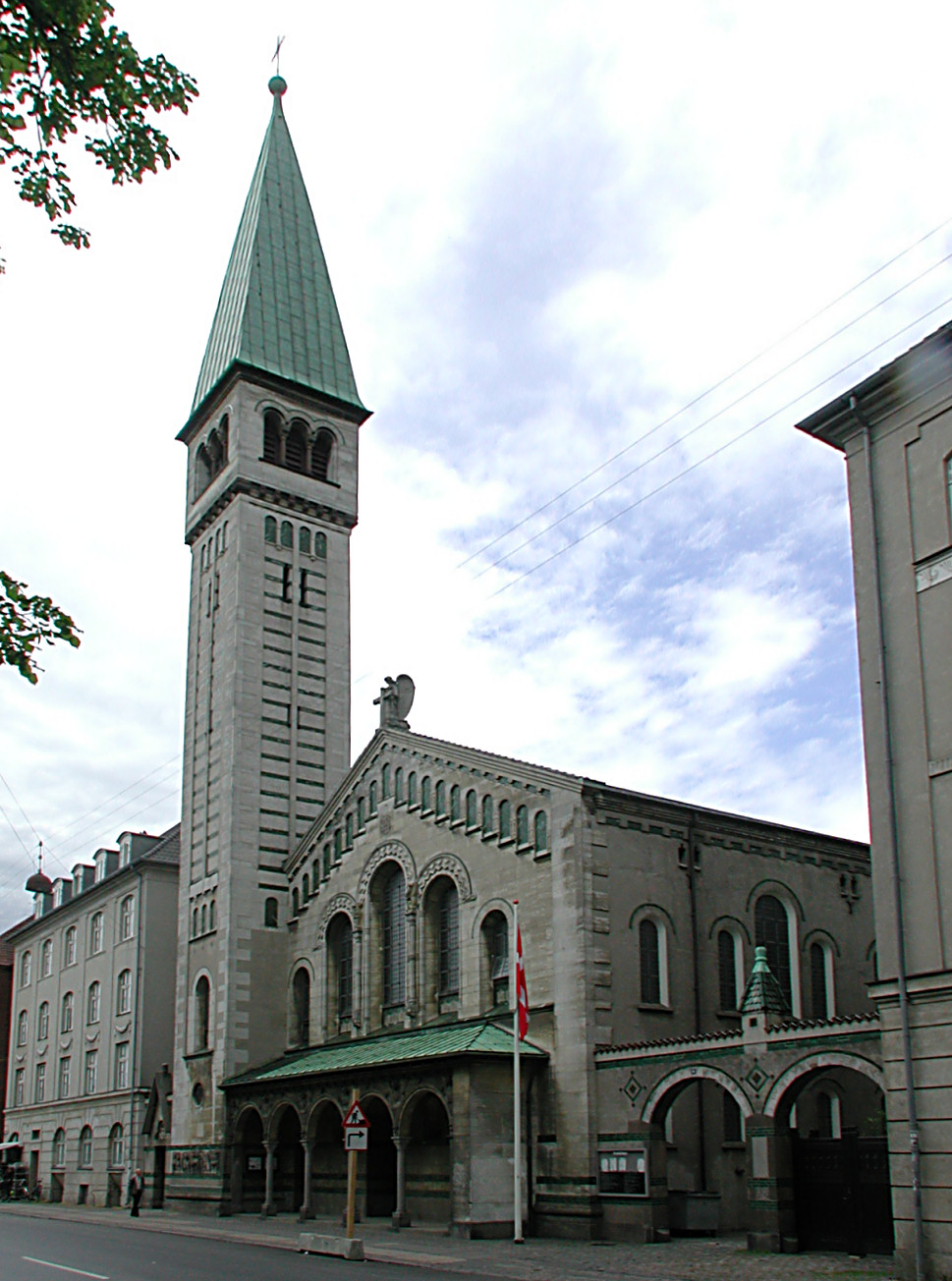
- Church of Christ seen from across the street
- Christ Church
- 55°40′4″N 12°32′42.3″E
- Location: 18 Enghave Plads; Vesterbro, Copenhagen
- Country: Denmark
- Denomination: Church of Denmark

History
- Status: Church

Architecture
- Architect: Valdemar Koch
- Architectural type: Church
- Groundbreaking: 1898
- Completed: 1900

Specifications
- Materials: Brick

Administration
- Archdiocese: Diocese of Copenhagen

Christ Church (Danish: Kristkirken) is a Church of Denmark parish church situated on Enghave Plads in the Vesterbro district of Copenhagen, Denmark. It was designed by Valdemar Koch, who also built several other churches in Copenhagen around that time. Completed in 1900, it was the first new church to be opened in the fast-growing neighbourhood to relieve the pressure on St. Mathew's. Its style is inspired by Italian Romanesque church architecture.

== History ==
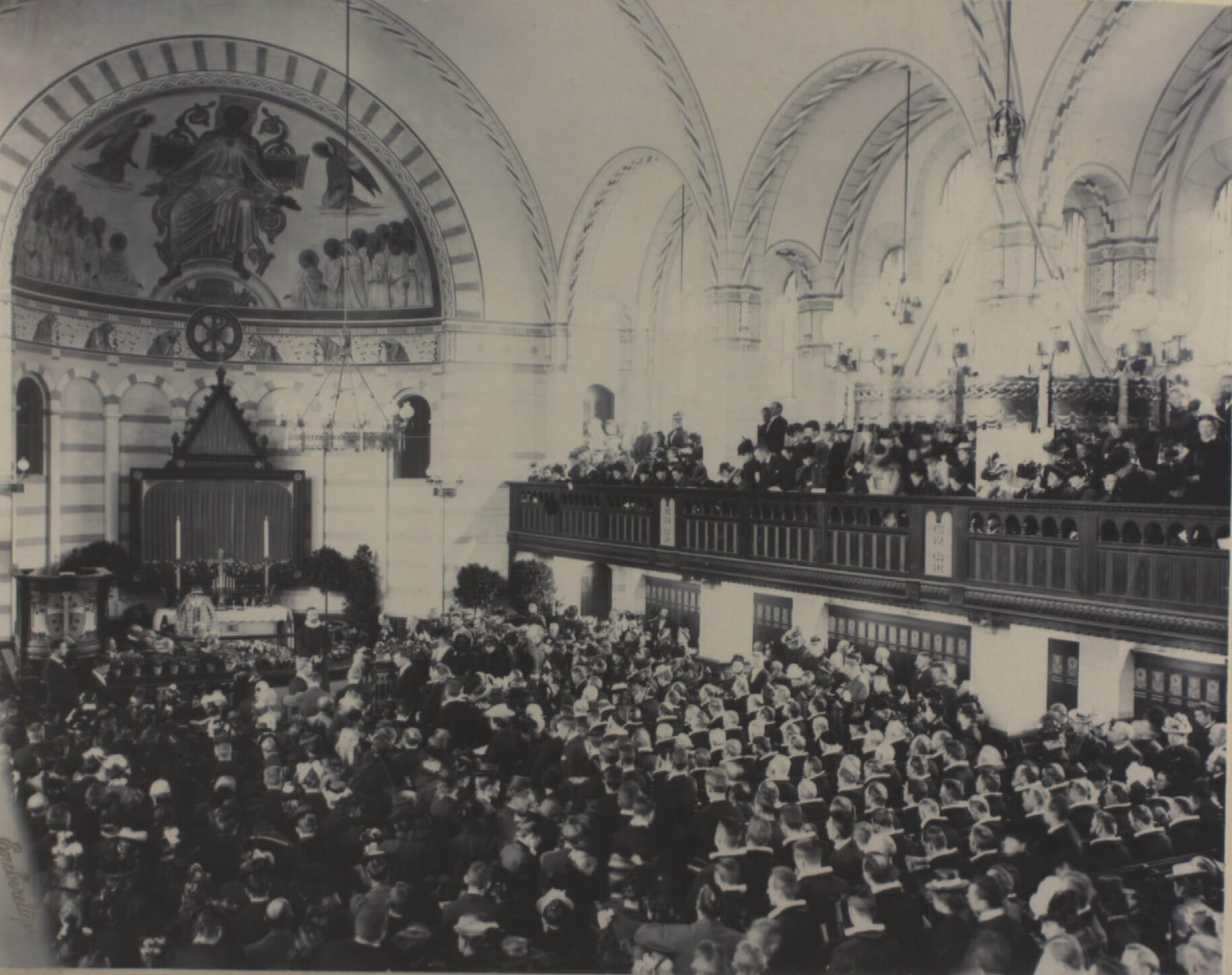
The inauguration of the church on 6 May 1900..

Consecrated in 1880, St. Mathew's was the first church to be built in the Vesterbro district of Copenhagen. By the end of the century the population of the parish had reached 70,000 and the need for new churches had become evident.

The Church of Christ on Enghave Plads was the second church to be built in the neighbourhood. It was the result of an initiative taken by Th. Løgstrup, a pastor based in Fredericia in Jutland. He had heard about the shortage of churches in the rapidly growing capital and conceived the idea that pastors from around the country should donate a church to the city. He began a collection in 1893 and by 1898 adequate funds had been raised for construction to start on a site provided free of charge by the city. The architect Valdemar Koch was commissioned to make the design and ground was broken on 29 March 1898.

The new church was inaugurated on 6 May 1900 at a ceremony attended by, among others, King Christian IX and about 100 pastors from around the country. Construction costs amounted to DKK 142,000. As a result, the Parish of Christ was disjoined from that of St. Matthew's. The church was refurbished in 1963-64.

== Architecture ==
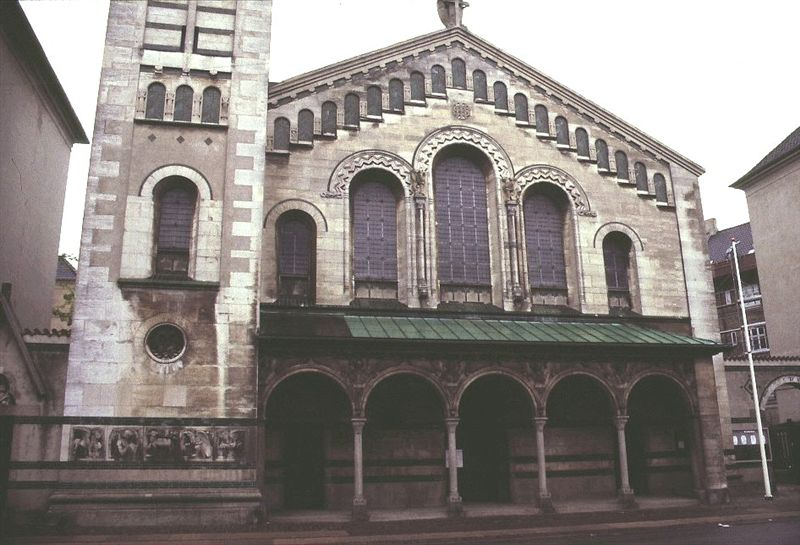
The reliefs at the base of the tower

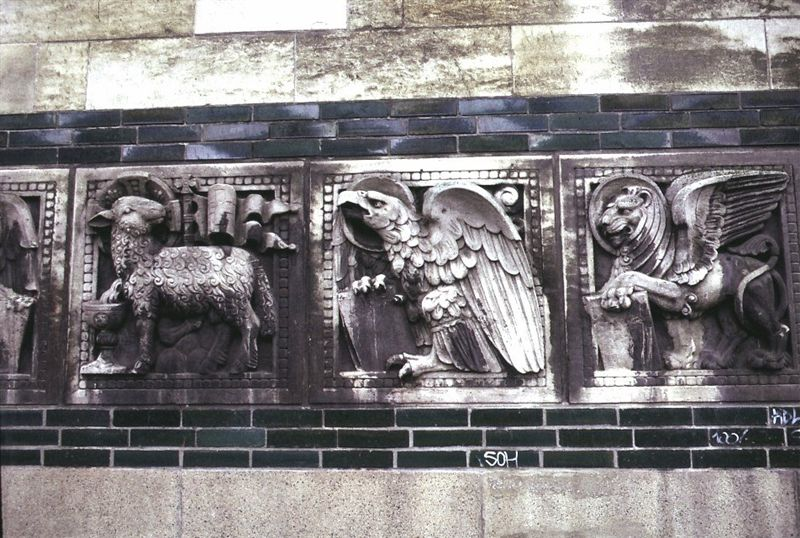
Part of the relief frie<e on the facade

The church is mainly built to a Neo-Romanesque design with inspiration from Italian Romanesque church architecture. Valdemar Koch claimed not to have relied on a specific church for inspiration but its design is quite similar to that of Spoleto Cathedral in Spoleto north of Rome.

The church is oriented along a north–south axis. It is built in yellow brick but the south-facing main facade towards the street is clad in limestone with ornamental bands in green-glazed tiles. In front of the main entrance there is a loggia supported by six columns and a roof clad in copper. Also clad in limestone, the tower stands at the south-west corner of the building. Above the loggia, the facade features a series of round-arched windows, highest in the middle to reflect the shape of the triangular gable.

The gable is topped by a kneeling angel created by Thomas Bærentzen. He also designed the angels on the loggia, the two animal figures in the window group and the reliefs at the base of the tower depicting the Four Evangelists' symbols.

A short wall with two arched gates to the right of the church connects it to the neighbouring residential building. The first gate leads to the entrance to the church office along the side of the church while the second affords access to an interior courtyard space which surrounds the church on three sides and has facilities for the adjoining residential buildings. The right "representative" side of the church building is dressed while the left side stands in blank brick.

== Interior and furnishings ==
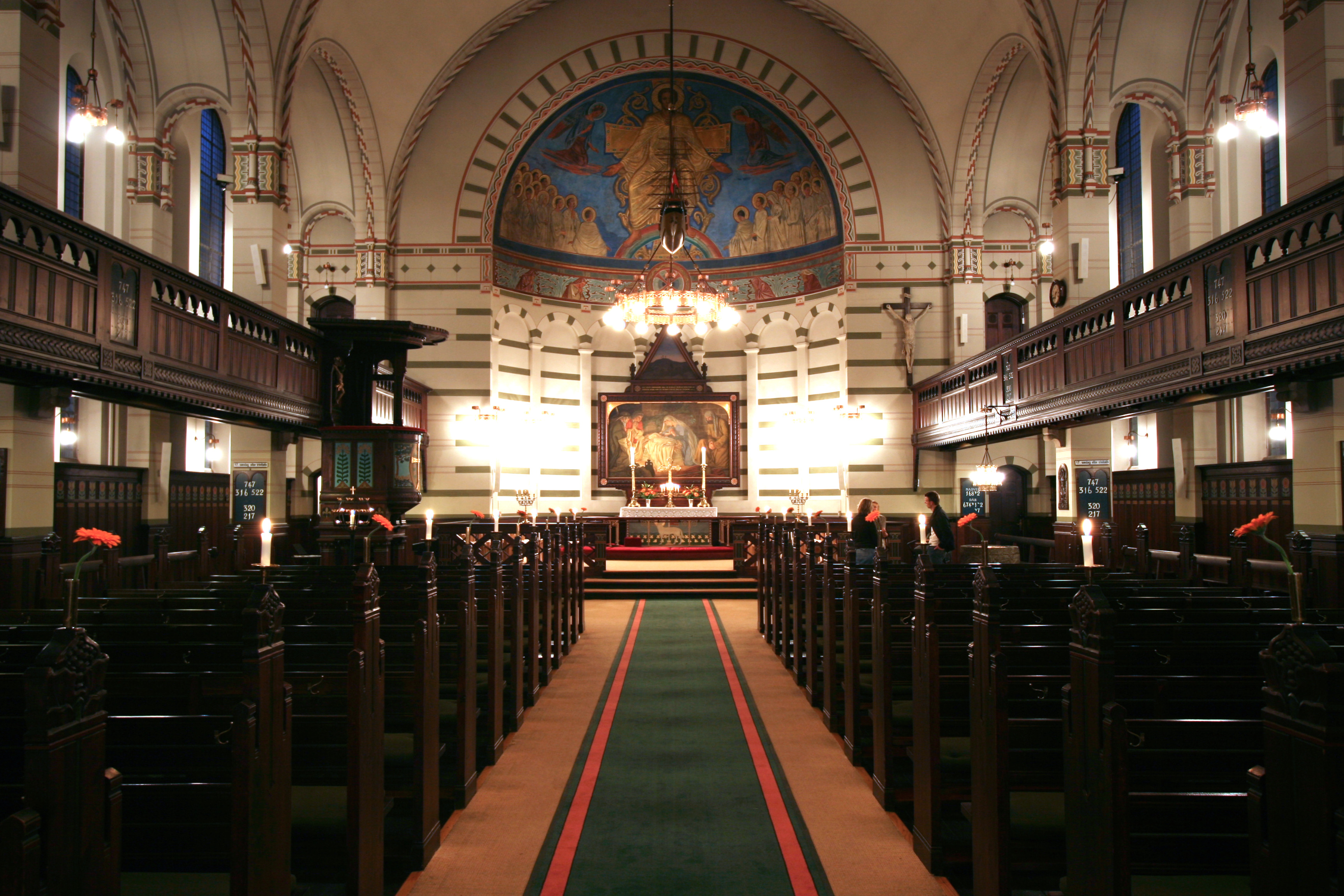
The interior of the church

The church is a three-nave building. The narrow lateral naves are separated from the central nave by arcades with columns bearing galleries.

Raised three steps from the nave, the choir has a large round-arched, vaulted altar niche in its rear wall with a fresco by Johannes Kragh.

The altarpiece depicting the birth of Christ was painted by Axel Helsted in 1903.

The Romanesque granite font comes from Virring Church in Jutland. It was deposited in the garden of the rectory when the church got a new wooden font back in the 18th century. The bronze font basin was designed by Lorenz Frølich.

== The church today ==
The church is a parish church within the Church of Denmark.

== Cultural references ==
The interior of the church is featured in several episodes of the second season of the Danish crime series Forbrydelsen under the fictional name "Skt. Simon".

== Gallery ==
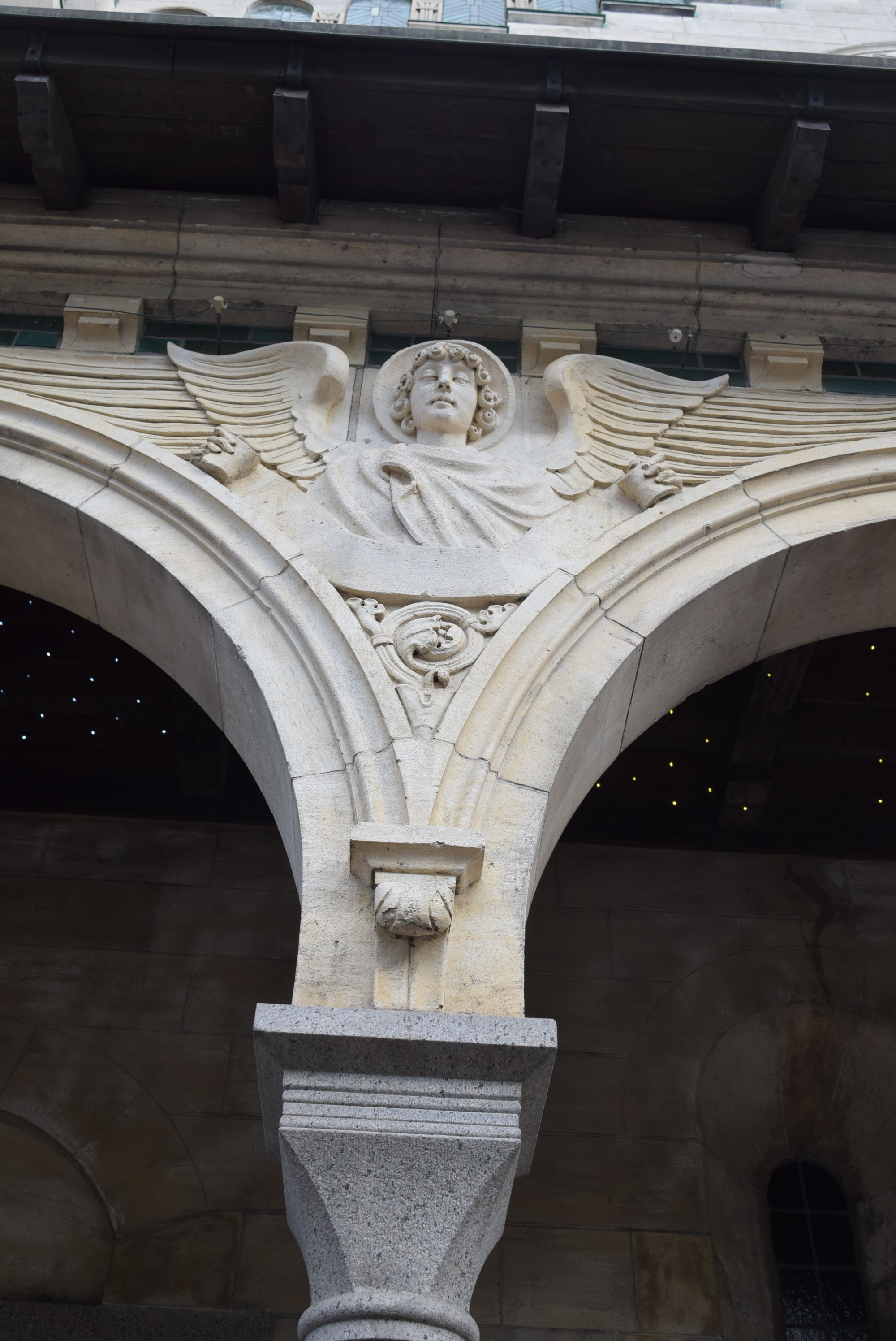

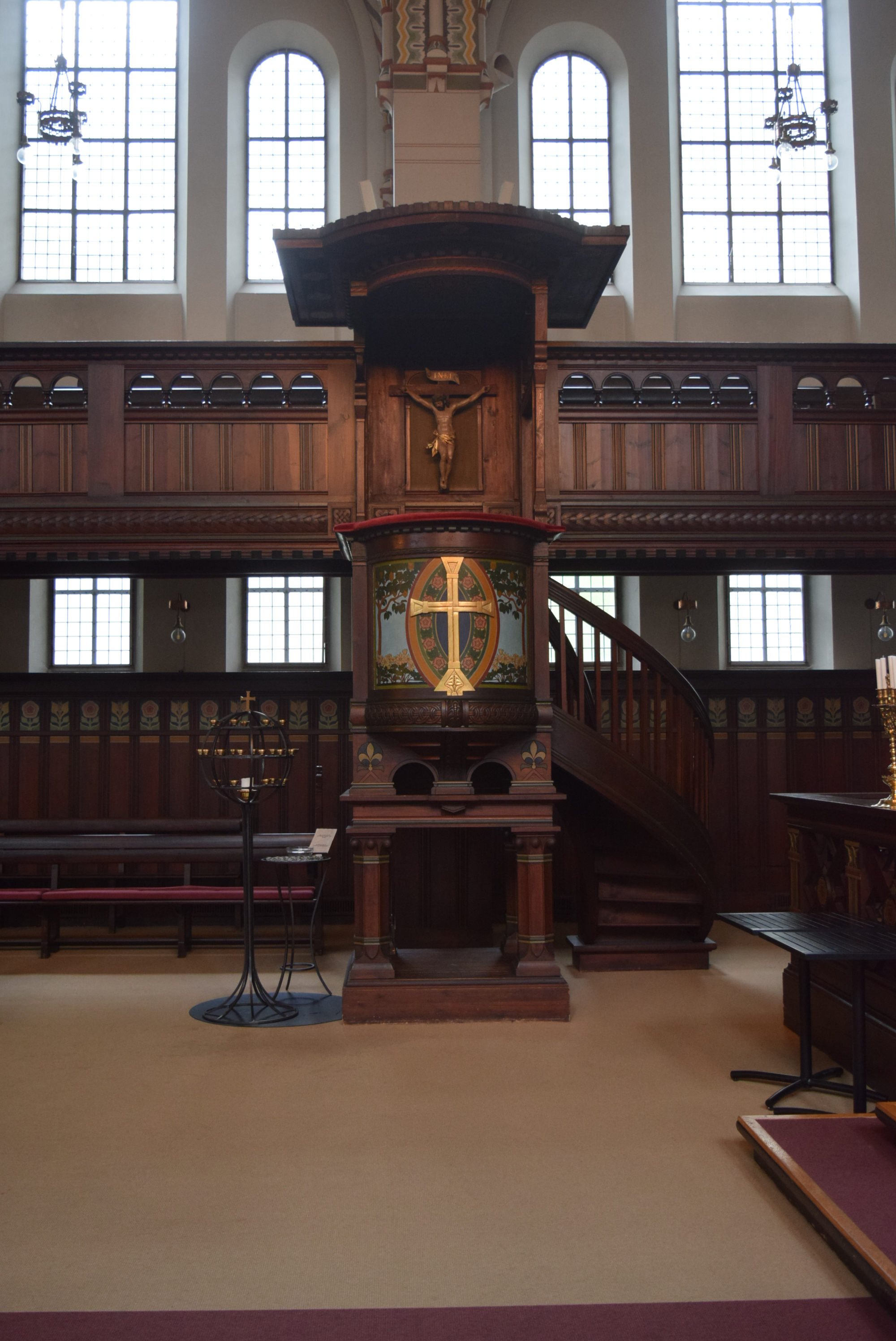

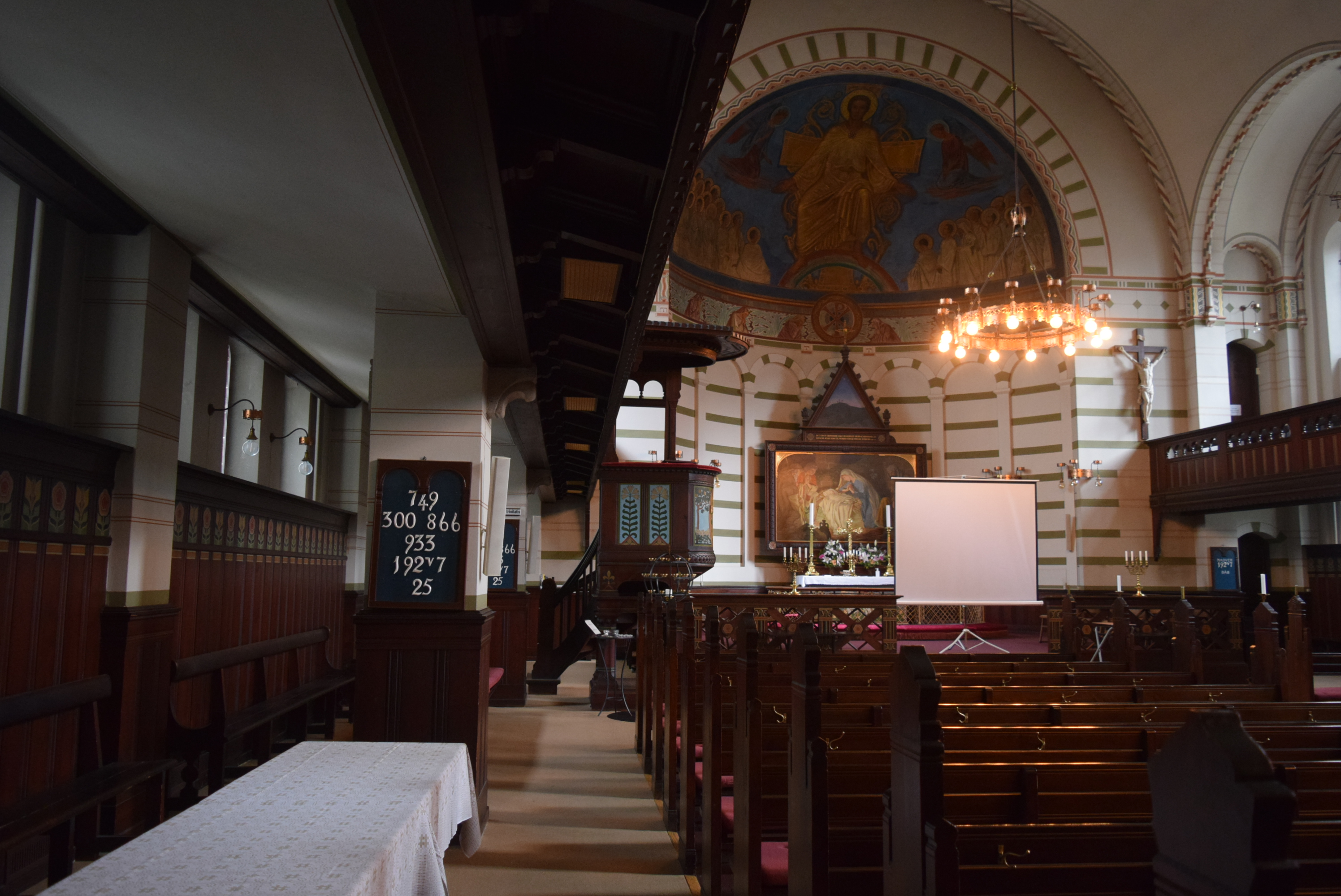

== See also ==
- Anna Church, Copenhagen
