= Zion's Church, Copenhagen =

Zion's Church
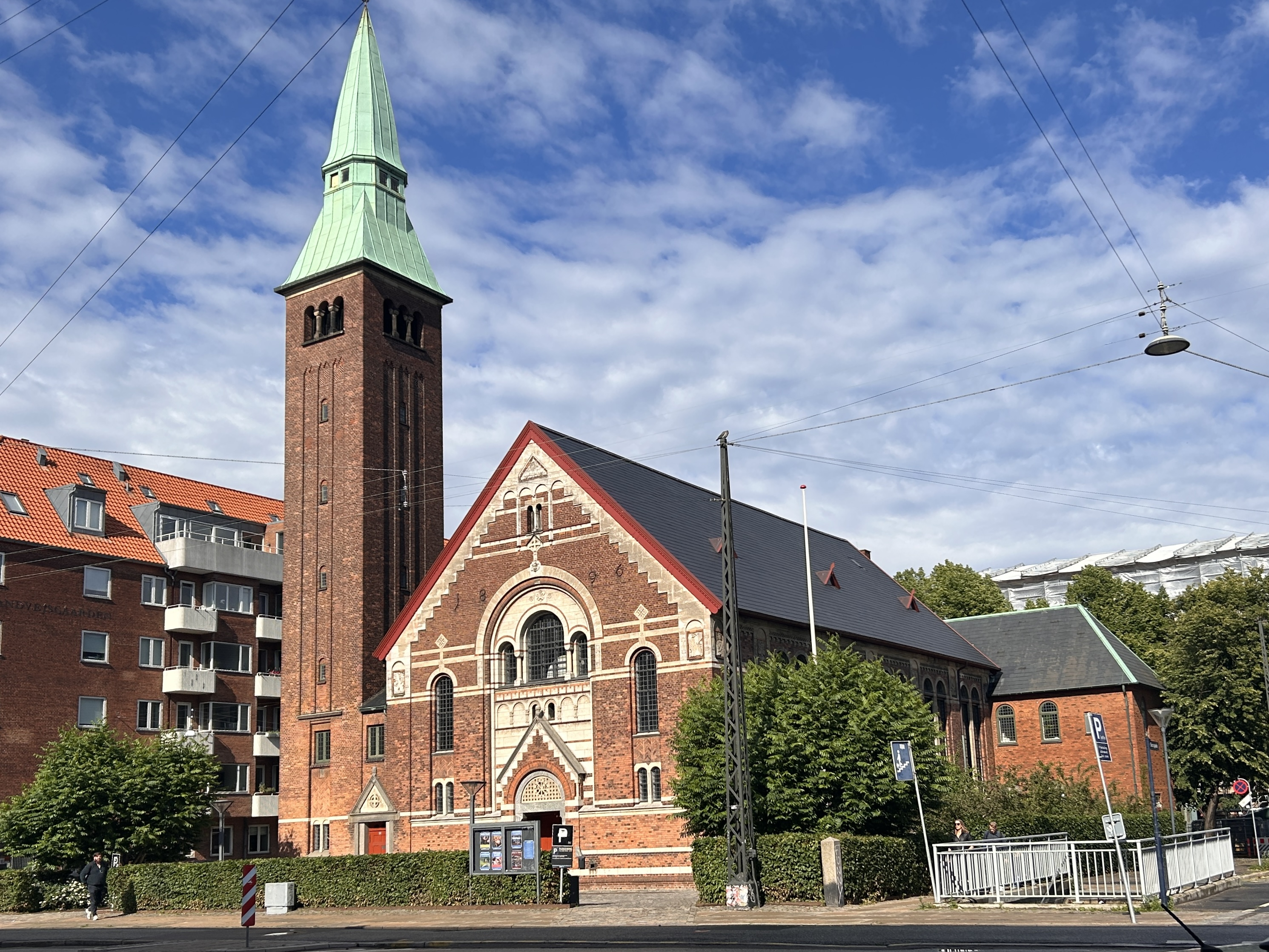
- Zion's Church viewed from Østerbrogade
- Zion's Church
- 55°42′40.7″N 12°34′41″E
- Location: Østerbro, Copenhagen
- Country: Denmark
- Denomination: Church of Denmark

History
- Status: Church

Architecture
- Architect: Valdemar Koch
- Architectural type: Church
- Completed: 1896

Specifications
- Materials: Brick

Administration
- Archdiocese: Diocese of Copenhagen

Zion's Church (Danish: Sions Kirke) is a Lutheran church on Østerbrogade, just south of Svanemøllen station, in the Østerbro district of Copenhagen, Denmark. It was completed in 1896 to a design by Valdemar Koch, making it the second-oldest church in Østerbro.

== History ==
In the early 1890s, St. James' Church was still the only church in the rapidly growing Østerbro district. In April 1893, its pastor, Pastor Krag, proposed that a second church in St. James' Parish be built in the area near the new Freeport of Copenhagen. The plans were later expanded to also include a third church in the neighbourhood but funds still needed to be found for the two new churches. Zion's Church was built for money donated by residents of St. James' Parish in connection with Pastor Krag's silver wedding and it is believed to be the first Danish church in modern times that was built exclusively from private means. The site was donated by the City. At that time, the address was on Strandvejen but the section between Jagtvej and Svanemøllen station was included in Østerbrogade in 1943.

The architect Valdemar Koch was charged with designing the church. The foundation stones (there were three, representing the Father, the Son and the Holy Ghost) were set on 9 July 1895 and it was consecrated on 27 September 1896. The church was originally built without a tower but one was added in 1921 to a design byK.Varming in 1921 .

== Architecture ==
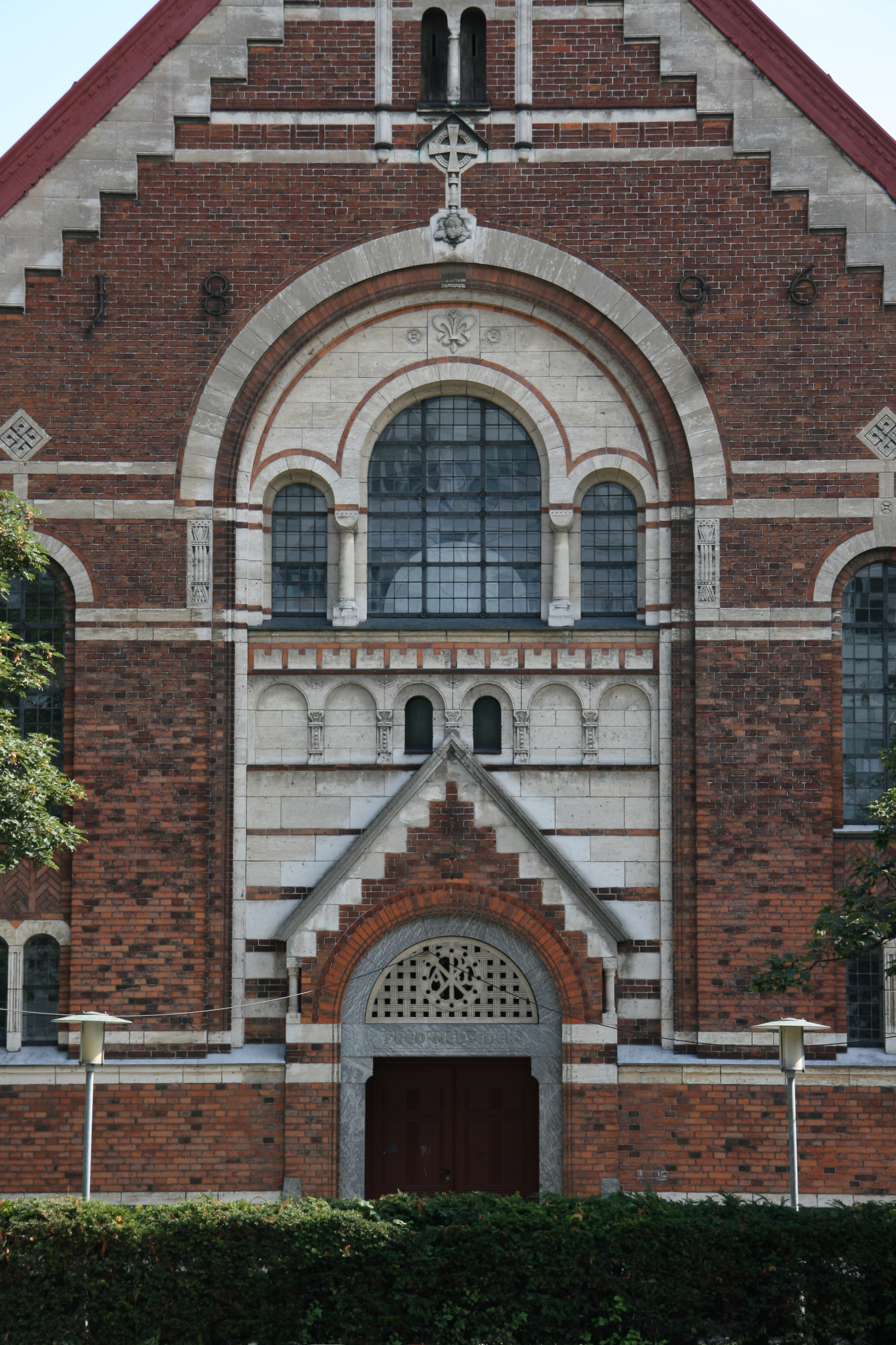
The west gable with the main entrance

The church is designed in a Neo-Romanesque style. It is built in red brick on a granite plinth with detailing in chalk. Savonnère stone, Öland chalk and Norwegian marble has also been employed. The western gable has a round arched portal with a Tympanum framed by a triangular gable below a window group unified by a large arch. The west gable's arch frieze is a copy of the one at Hammlev Church near on Djursland. Koch had previously surveyed the chalk churches of the area around Grenå and published a book about them in 1896. The sides of the building have friezes, executed in chalk by Th. Bærentsen, and are segmented by lesenes .

== Interior and furnishings ==
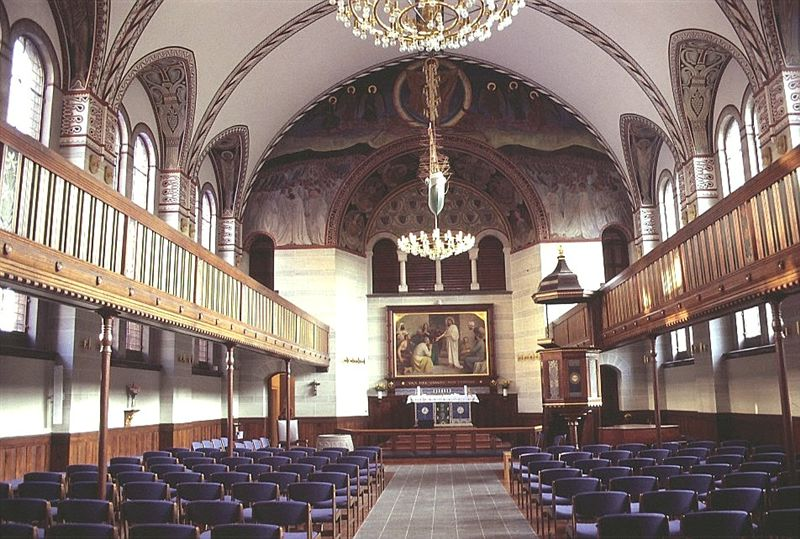
Interior

The barrel vaulted church room has wooden galleries supported by iron pillars on both sides. The chancel is raised three steps and behind the altar table is a painting by P. Steffensen depicting Den Vantro Thomas (Doubting Thomas). The mural on the walls of the choir was painted by Johannes Kragh in 1899 and shows the Resurrection of Jesus. Krag also painted the mural on the west wall, surrounding the organ. It presents The Apocalypse.

The baptismal font is in granite and has reliefs by Anders Bundgaard which are inspired by those on Romanesque granite fonts. They depict deer surrounding the Tree of Life, the Fall of man and, on its base, an animal biting a snake.

== See also ==
- Church of Christ, Copenhagen
