= Johannes Kragh =

Danish sculptor (1870–1946)

- Born: 9 May 1870; Holsteinborg, Denmark
- Died: 11 January 1946 (aged 75); Gentofte, Denmark
- Occupation: Sculptor

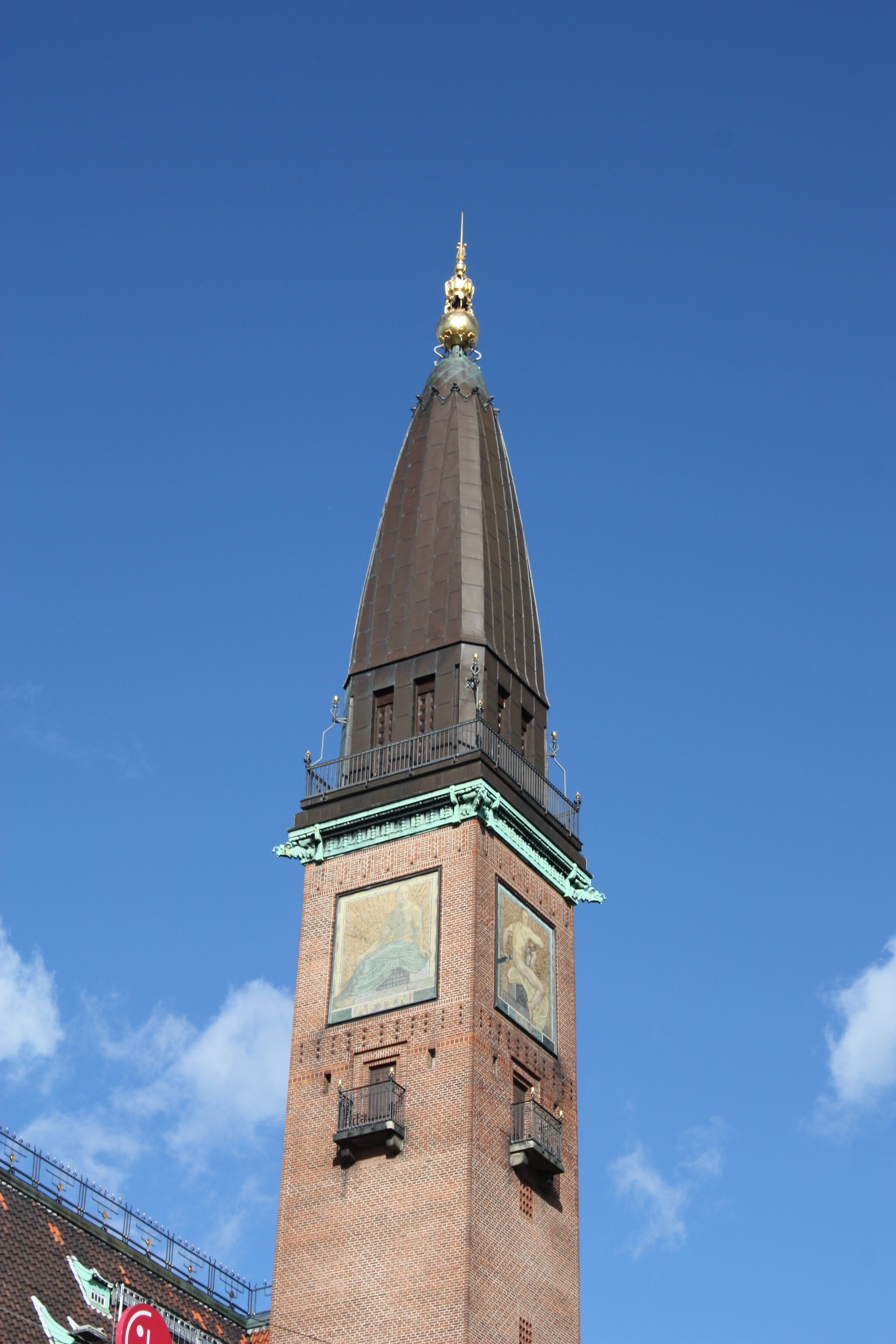
Tower of the Copenhagen Palace Hotel with Kragh's mosaics

Johannes Kragh (9 May 1870 – 11 January 1946) was a Danish painter and sculptor.

== Life ==
Kragh was born in Bisserup, the son of a priest. He trained as both a craftsman and an artist, and worked with church frescoes, glass mosaic, watercolour, oil painting and sculpture. From 1883 to 1887 he was a pupil of Jacob Kornerup, Viggo Pedersen and Holger Grønvold, after which he spent a year at the Royal Danish Academy of Fine Arts. From 1888 to 1889 he was with P.S. Krøyer at the Kunstnernes Frie Studieskoler.

He specialised in art for churches, in which he was influenced by Joakim Skovgaard and the Skønvirke movement (the Danish equivalent of Art Nouveau and Jugendstil). His earliest church decorations were frescoes, but he later concentrated on glass painting. His best-known work however is not in a church, but in the Palace Hotel on the Rådhusplads in Copenhagen, where he created the big mosaics on the tower. He also painted many portraits and landscapes, and sculpted many portrait busts.

He submitted work for the sculpture event in the art competition at the 1924 Summer Olympics.

Kragh undertook many study trips, the first in 1896–97 to Italy and again in 1900 to Rome to study with the sculptor Victor Ségoffin. He also visited the UK, France, Hungary and Yugoslavia.

He died in 1946 in Gentofte.

== Selected public works ==
- Four mosaics on the tower of the Palace Hotel in Copenhagen 1907-10
- Monument to Henrik Gerner in Birkerød 1917
- Frescoes, glass painting, altar in granite and relief carving in limestone, Kirkeby church in Svendborg commune 1921
- Choir in Østerbølle church 1932
- Choir in Give church 1933
