= Hellerup Church =

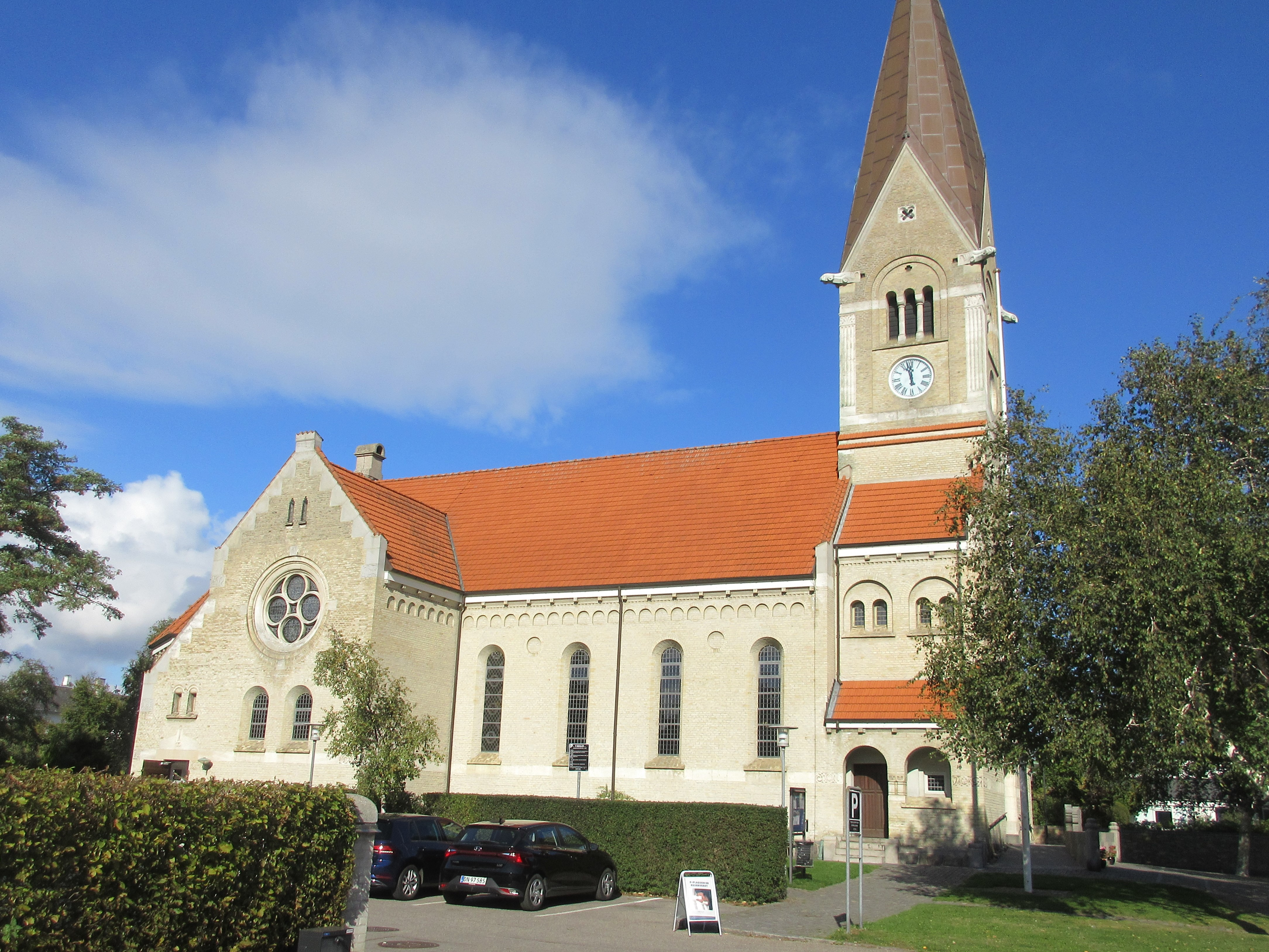
- Hellerup Church
- 55.734333°N 12.573056°E
- Location: Margrethevej 7A; 2900Hellerup
- Country: Denmark
- Denomination: Protestant Church

History
- Status: Church

Architecture
- Architect: Thorvald Jørgensen
- Completed: 1900

Specifications
- Materials: Brick

Hellerup Church is a Church of Denmark parish church situated on Margrethevej, off Strandvejen, in central Hellerup, Gentofte Municipality, Copenhagen, Denmark. Constructed in 1899–1900 to a Historicist design by Thorvald Jørgensen, who would later design Christiansborg Palace, it was the second parish church to be built in Gentofte Municipality.

== History ==
Towards the end of the 19th century, the population of Gentofte Parishstarted to grow more rapidly. The residents of the emerging district of Hellerup had either to use Gentofte Church to the north or Zion's Church or St. Jacob's Church in Østerbro. In 1893, a church room was installed on the first floor of the private villa at Sofievej 33. It was given the name Emmaus and had room for around 150 church-goers. The house was owned by piano manufacturer Harald Theodor Peter Hindsberg. In the summer time, outdoor service was also conducted under the canopy of a large beech tree in Hellerupgård's garden.

In 1895, a committee was finally set up with the ambition of constructing a proper church in the growing community. The writer Peder Søren Lemche (1835-1901), who owned Nordre Onsgård, offered to contribute to the project with a piece of land. The committee was given a choice between three possible locations. The three sites were located on Aurehøjvej, Margrethevej and the corner of Lemckesvej and Strandvejen, respectively. The location on Margrethevej was ultimately selected as the more peaceful of the three sites. The still relatively young and inexperienced architect Thorvald Jørgensen was charged with creating a design proposal for a church with 600 seats. He had already designed Nathanael's Church on Holmbladsgade on Amager and the then-under-construction Brorson's Church on Rantzausgade in Nørrebro. Jørgensen's proposal was approved by the committee. On 18 March 1899, it was also approved by the local Parish Council. The foundation stone was set on 28 April 1899. The church was inaugurated on 14 October 1900. On 26 October, Hellerup Church was handed over to Gentofte Municipality. On 28 September 1901, Hellerup Parish was formally disjoined from Gentofte Parish. A new congregation house (menighedshus) was inaugurated on 6 January 1907.

By 1912, Hellerup Church had already become too small. On 1 July 1918, in anticipation of the construction of Church of the Messiah, in Charlottenlund, Maglegård Parish was disjoined from Hellerup Parish. On 27 February 1949, Helleruplund Parish was also disjoined. Hellerup church was converted into a self-owning institution on 1 April 1974. At the time of its 75 years anniversary, the parish had just under 7,000 residents.

== Architecture ==
Hellerup Church is built to a Historicist design, combining inspiration from traditional Romanesque churches with influences from Jugendstil and other contemporary styles. It has a cruciform layout and is constructed in yellow brick with bands of limestone. The facade is finished with a thin layer of lime mortar. The tower at the eastern end of the church stands 36 m tall. The ground floor of the tower serves as a porch. The main entrance is accented with a limestone portal. The present chancel replaced a somewhat smaller one in 1918. The stained glass windowsof the chancel were created by Johannes Kragh in 1918. They feature the four arch angels Gabriel, Mikael, Rafael and Uriel. The rose window above the main entrance in the tower was created by Johannes Kragh in 1928. It is a representation of the verse line "Alle jordens roser røde ej forslår til lammets krans" from Thomas Kingo's hymn Morgenstunden. The rose window in the southern cross arm was created by Krag in 1940 and feature the four evangelist symbols.

== Furnishings and fittings ==
The baptismal font was designed by Siegfried Wagner and Mogens Ballin. They were in the process of establishing a metal workshop in Hellerup. Ballin lost money on the commission but hoped that it would serve as marketing for the new venture. The baptismal font is executed in tin and brass. It features three fish. It was well received by the magazine Kunst. The altar silverware was designed by P.V. Jensen Klint.

The present altarpiece was created by Aksel Theilmann in 1948–1950.It was designed with inspiration of the so-called "golden altars" of the 11th and 12th centuries. Examples of the original golden altars can be found in Sahl Church in Jutland as well as in the National Museum of Denmark. The central motif of the altar piece is a Christ figure. The priginal altarpiece was painted by Lorenz Frølich (1820-1908). The carved and partly gilded frame was created by Niels Larsen Stevns. Frølich's family owned the nearby country house Blidah. The central painting of the original altarpiece, depicting "Christmas Night", is now mounted on the wall next to the baptismal font.

The present pews were a donation from Gentofte Municipality in 1950. They were designed by the architect Kaj Rasmussen and created by the furniture workshop Rud. Rasmussen on Nørrebrogade in Copenhagen.

The organ is also from 1950. It is a Marcussen & Søn organ with 34 stops. The facade was designed in collaboration with architect Jah Rasmussen.
