= Rantzausgade =

Street in Copenhagen, Denmark

Coordinates: 55.6868°N 12.5488°E

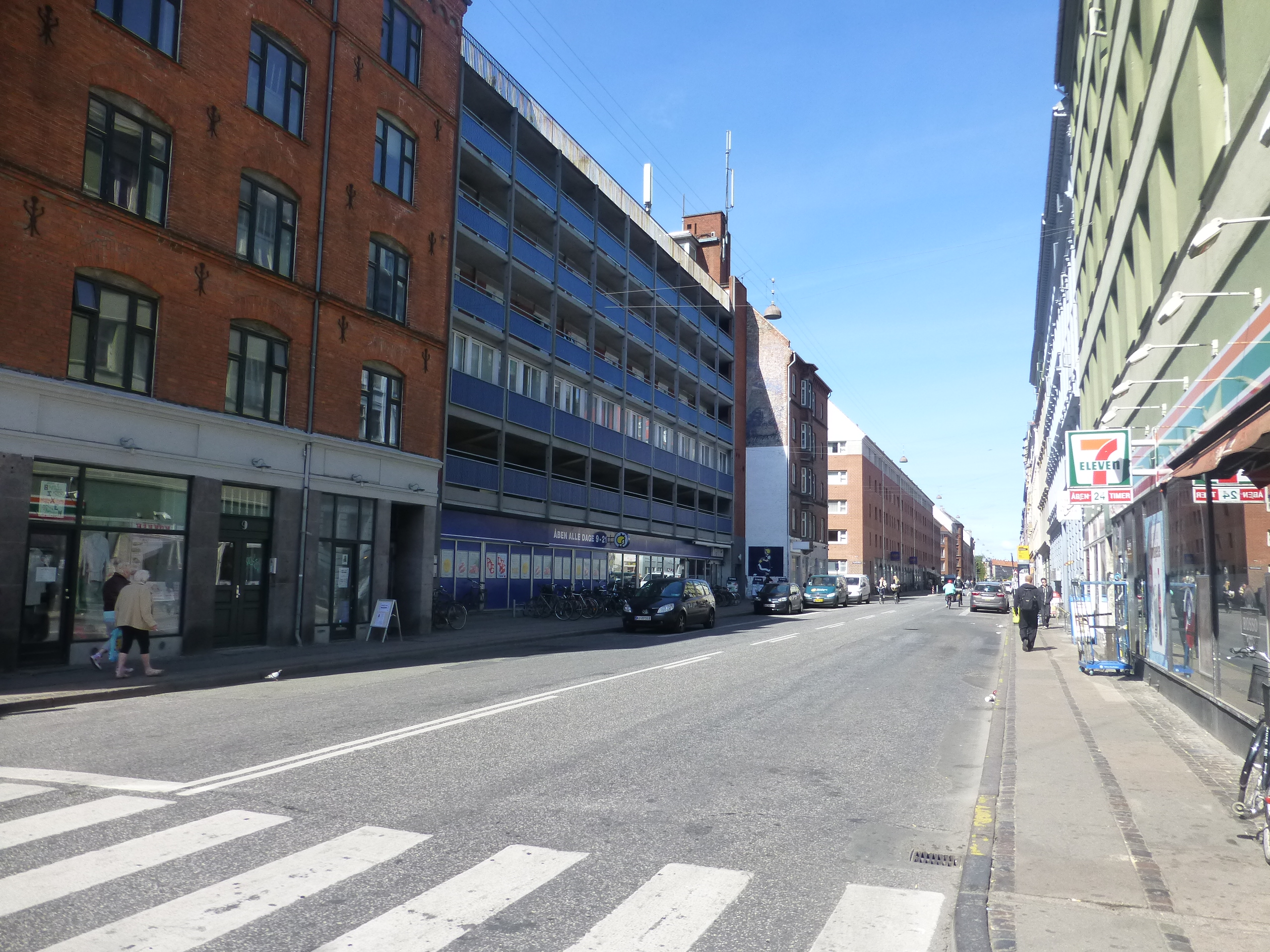
Rantzausgade

Rantzausgade is a street in the Nørrebro district of Copenhagen, Denmark. It runs from Åboulevard in the southeast to Jagtvej in the northeast where its name changes to Borups Allé.

== History ==
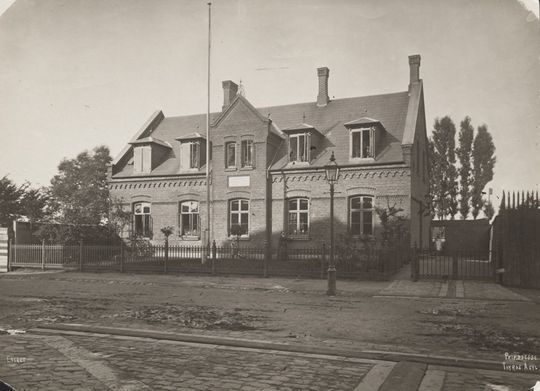
Prinsesse Thyras Asyl, a private kindergarten opened on the street in 1878

Rantzausgade was originally called Nordvestvej ("Northwest Road") and only reached as far as Brohusgade where it ended in a wooden fence. Being located within the so-called Demarcation Line which followed Jagtvej, that is on the esplanade (in the original military sense of the word) outside Copenhagen's fortifications, only minor buildings could be built in the area. The area on the other side of the fence continued down to the Ladegård Canal to the south and was used for market gardens. They were particularly known for their production of rhubarb. When the area was built over from the 1870s on, developing into a dense working-class neighbourhood, one of the poorest in Copenhagen, it became known as Rabarberkvarteret ("The Rhubarb Neighbourhood"). The term rabarberkvarter has in Danish since developed into a derogatory, generic term for a poor, late 19th or early 20th-century working-class neighbourhood with low housing standards.

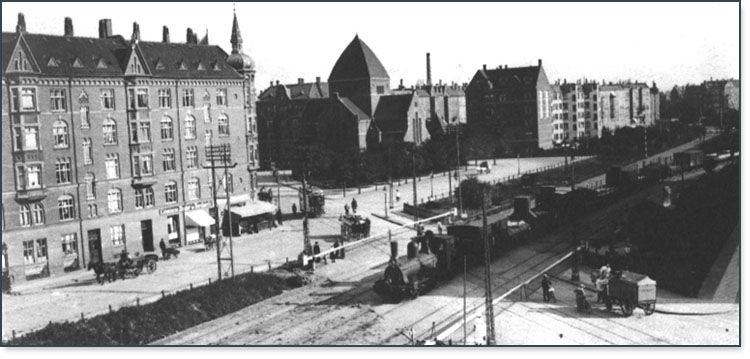
The railway crossing and Brorson's Church

The Nordbanen railway line crossed the street from 1894 on its way from Copenhagen's second central station at Axeltorv to Helsingør. The railway crossing disappeared in 1930 when the Boulevard Line opened. Tram line No. 13 operated through the street from 1915 until 1965 on its way from the City Hall Square to Lyngbygade (Now Hillerødgade).

== Notable buildings and residents ==
Glud & Marstrand's former metal goods factory is located at No. 22-24. It was converted into a combined restaurant, wine store and wine bar by Kenn Husted in 2017.

Brorson's Church (No. 49) is from 1901 and was designed by Thorvald Jørgensen, who also designed Christiansborg as well as several other churches in Copenhagen.

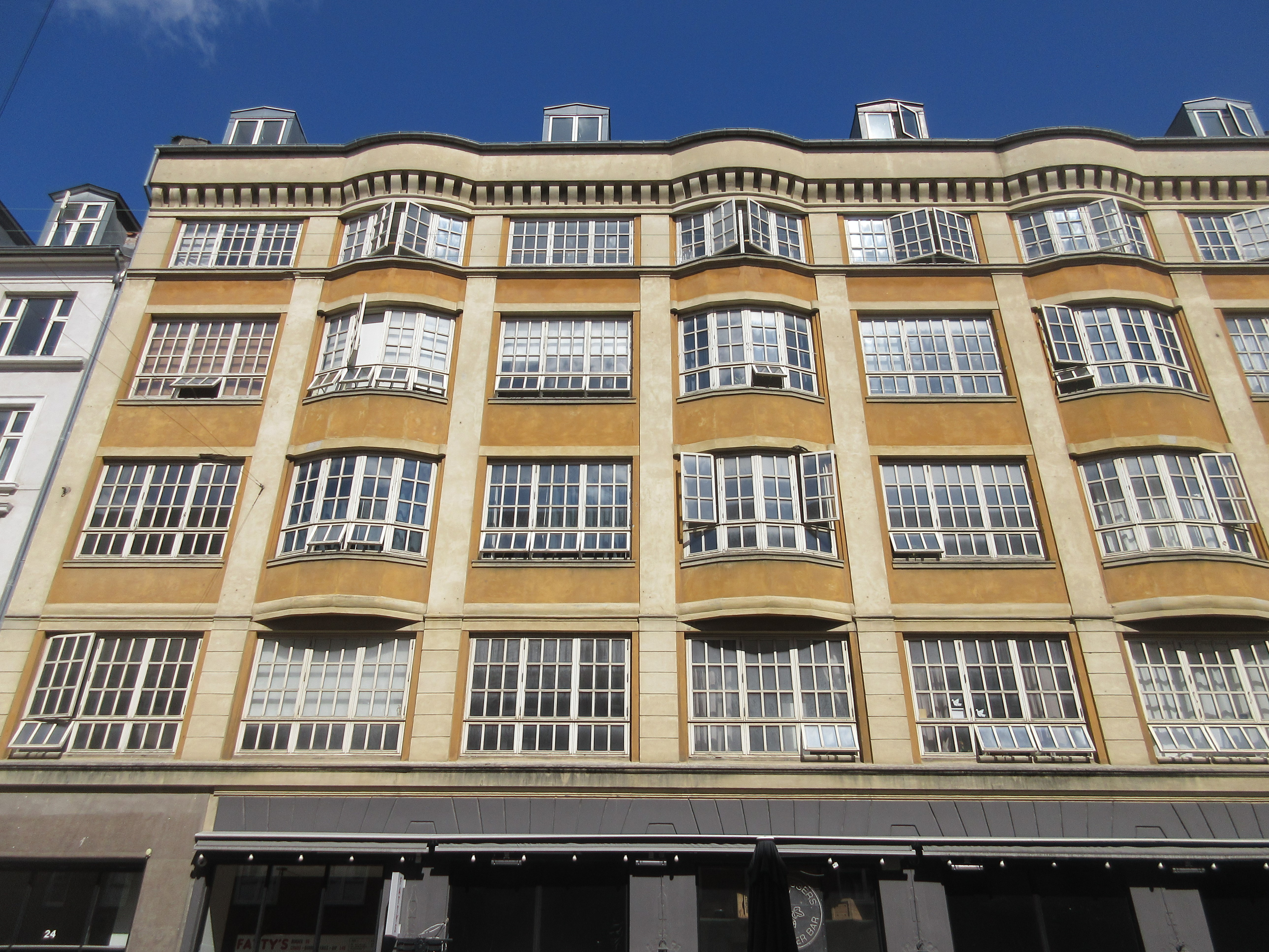
The Glud / Marstrand building.

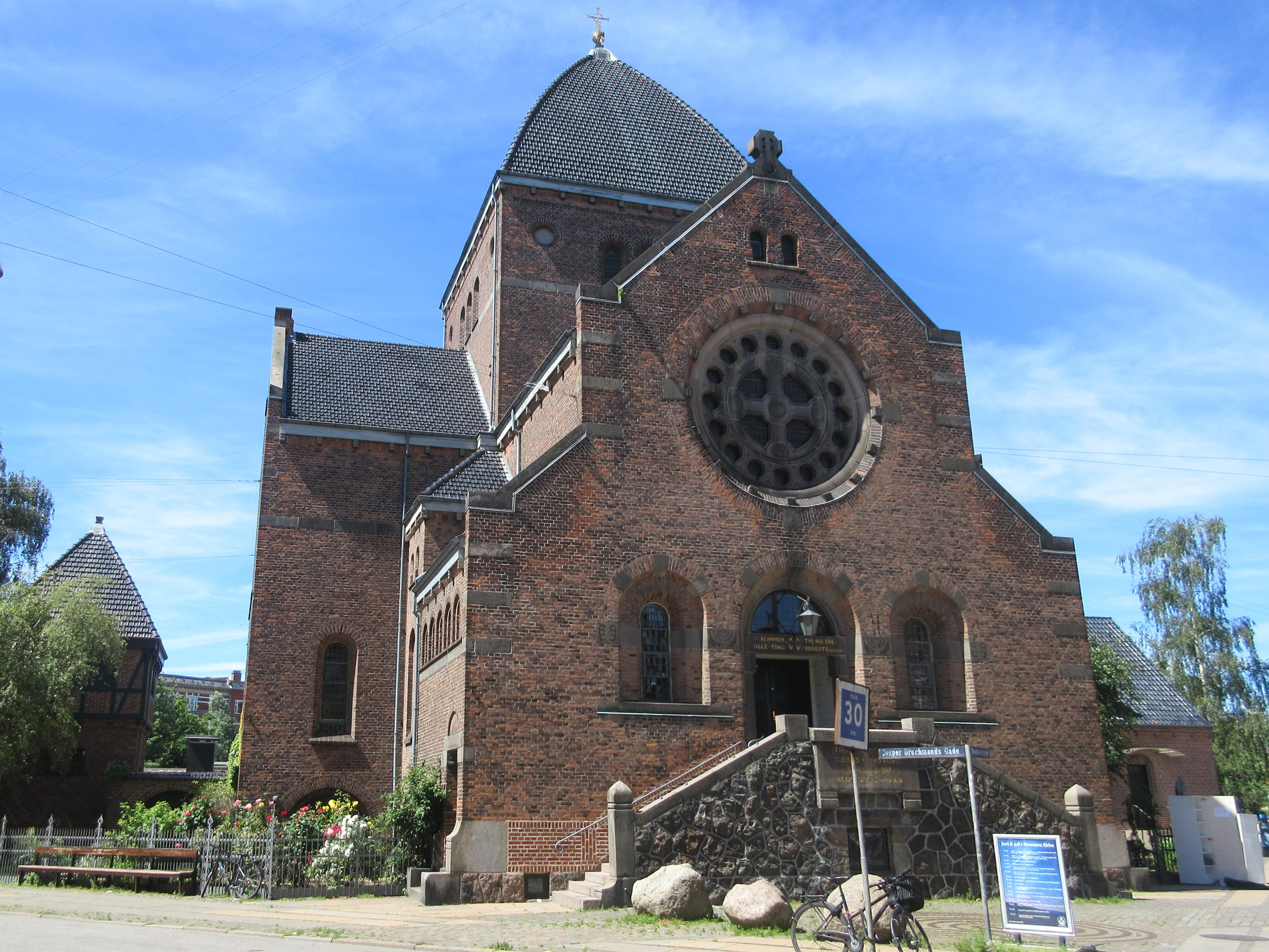
Brorson's Church].

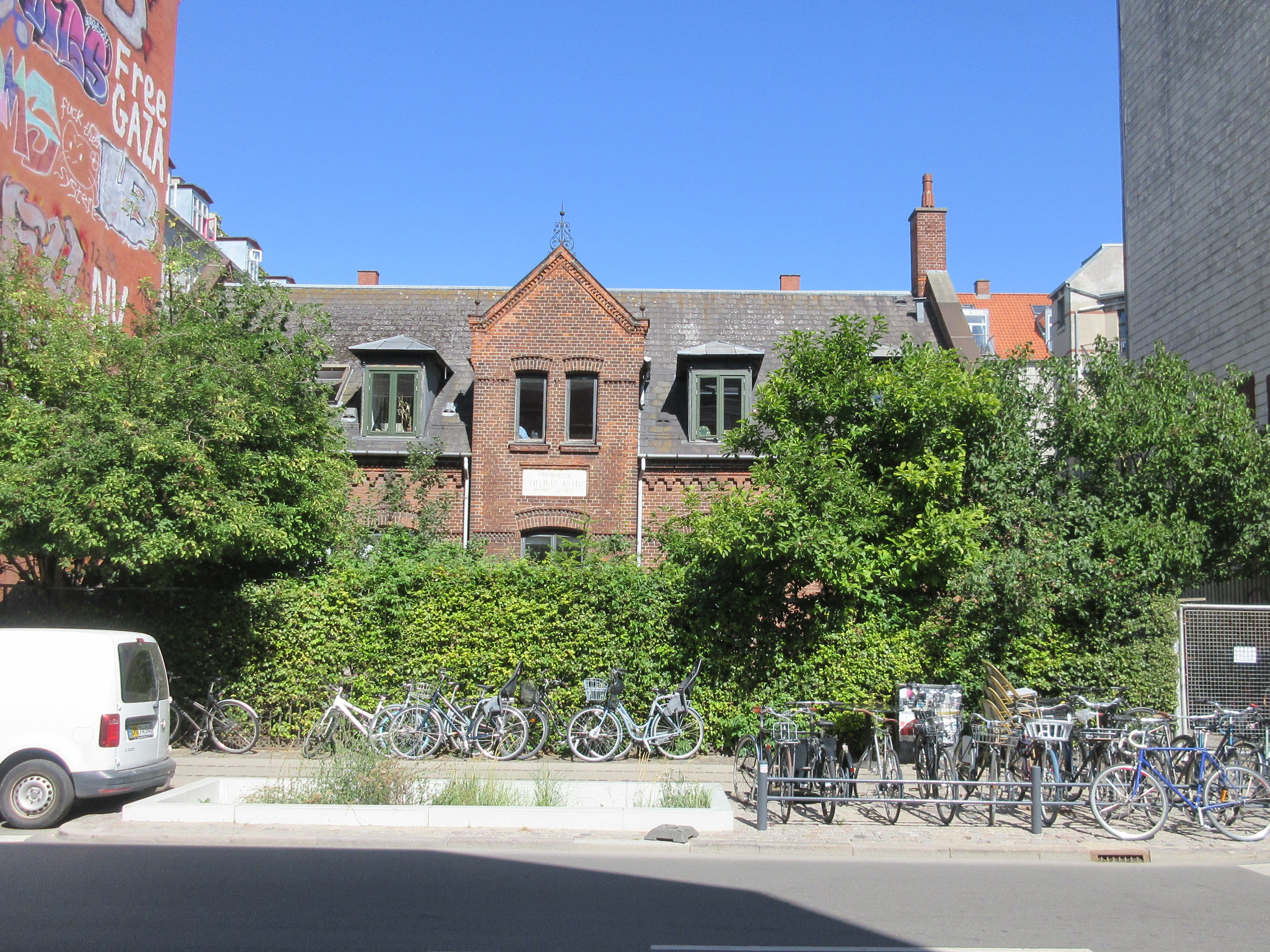
Prinsesse Thyras Asyl.

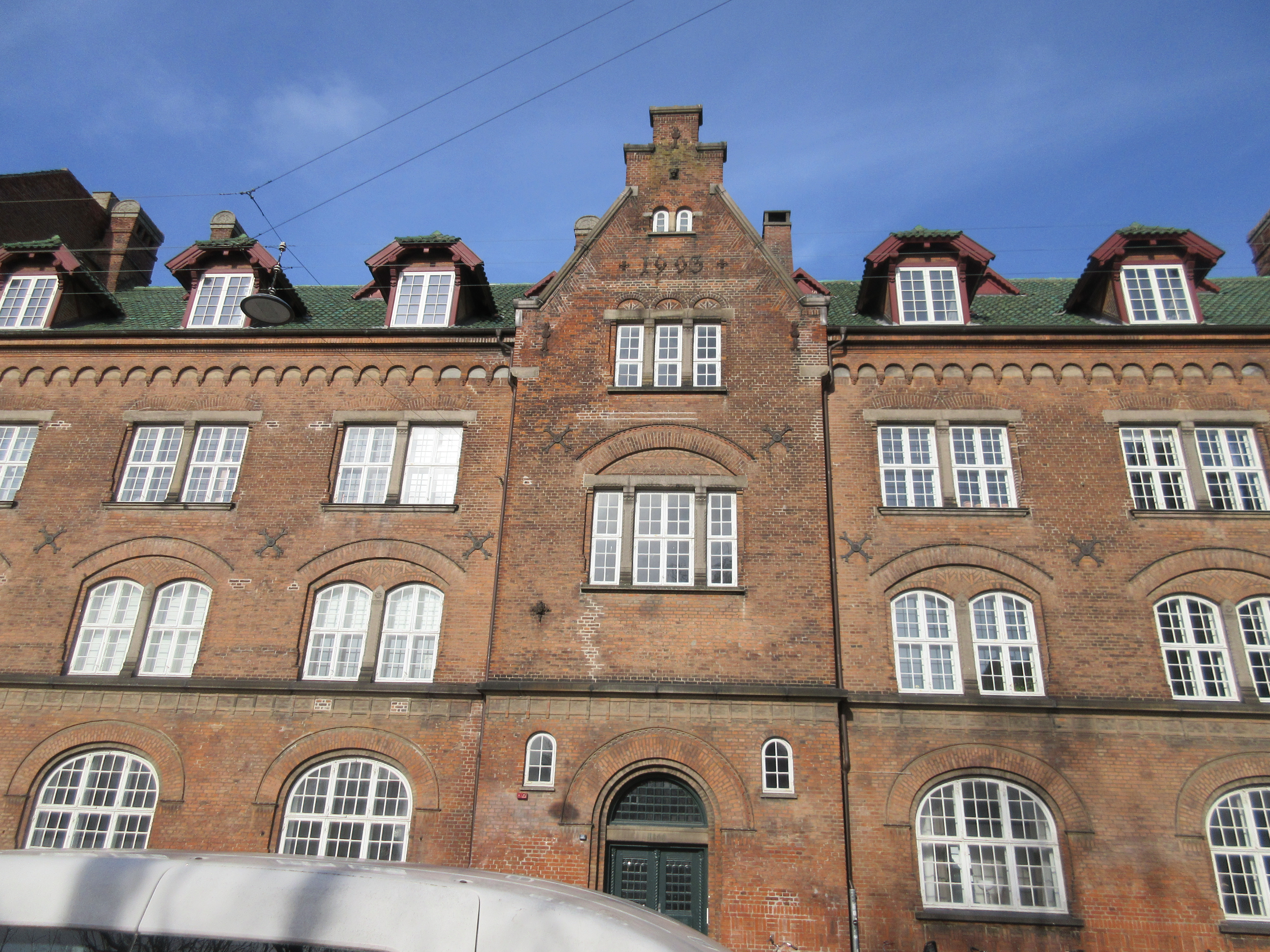
No. 60: Former home for apprentices.

== Artworks, memorials and urban design ==
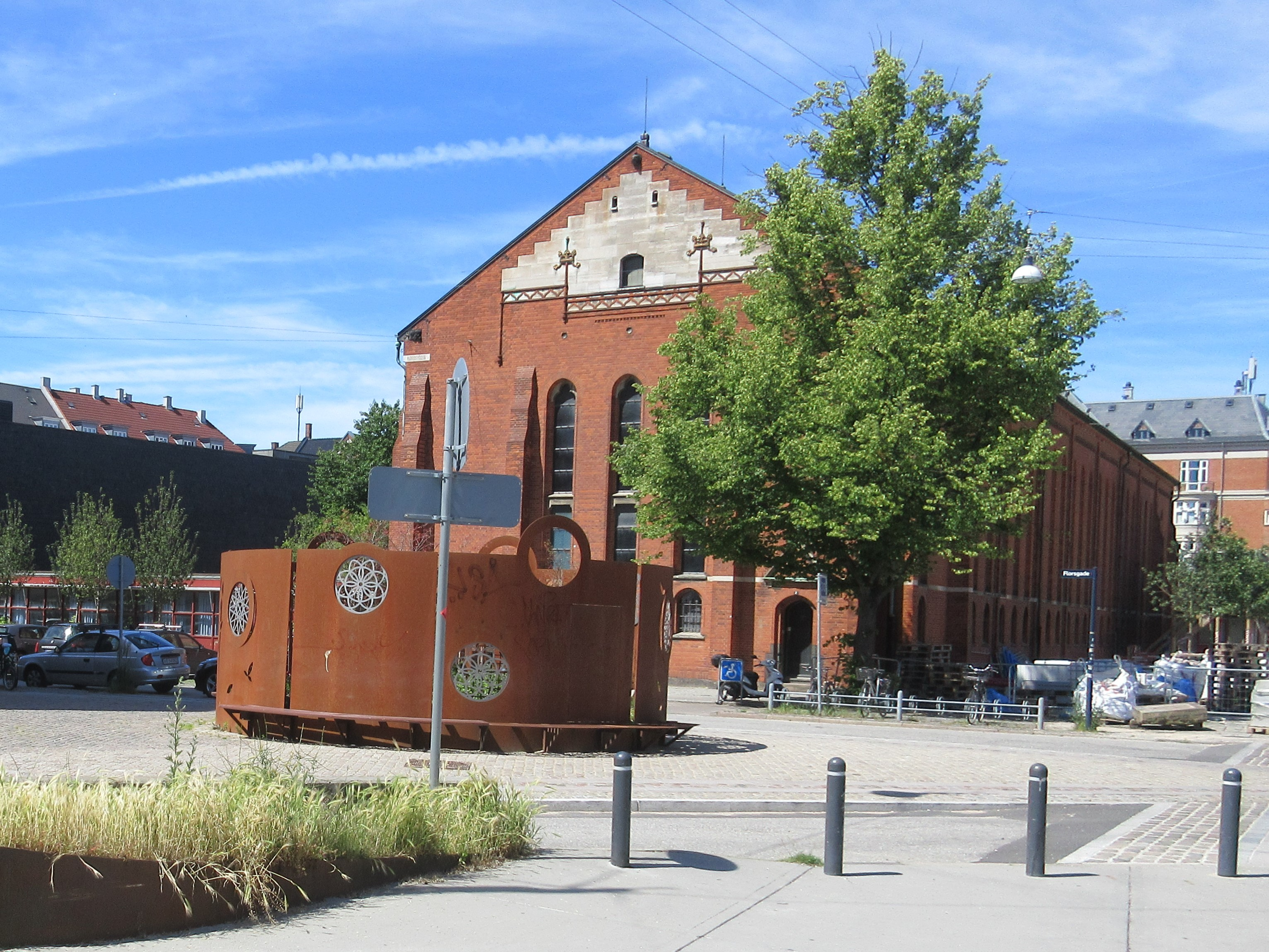
The Secret Garden and the gable of the Regional Archives Building

The artwork Secret Garden (Den hemmelige have) was designed by Morten Stræd in connection with the creation of three new urban spaces between Rantzausgade and the Agade Cycle Bridge in 2011.

== Transport ==
A bus trap is located at the site where the bikeway crosses Rantzausgade. The street is served by bus lines 12, 18 and 66.

== Cultural references ==
In his memoir, En rabarberdreng vokser op ("A Rhubarb Boy Grows Up"), the writer Christian Christensen describes his childhood, growing up in a working-class family living on Nordvestvej.
