= M1923 =

M1923 may refer to:

- Beretta M1923, a semi-automatic pistol
- M1923 helmet (Denmark), a combat helmet used by the Danish military
- M1923 medium tank prototype, United States; pre–World War II
- M1923 sniper rifle, a subtype of the Krag–Jørgensen sniper rifle
- Thompson Model 1923, a heavy submachine gun variant of the Thompson submachine gun
