= Isaiah Church =

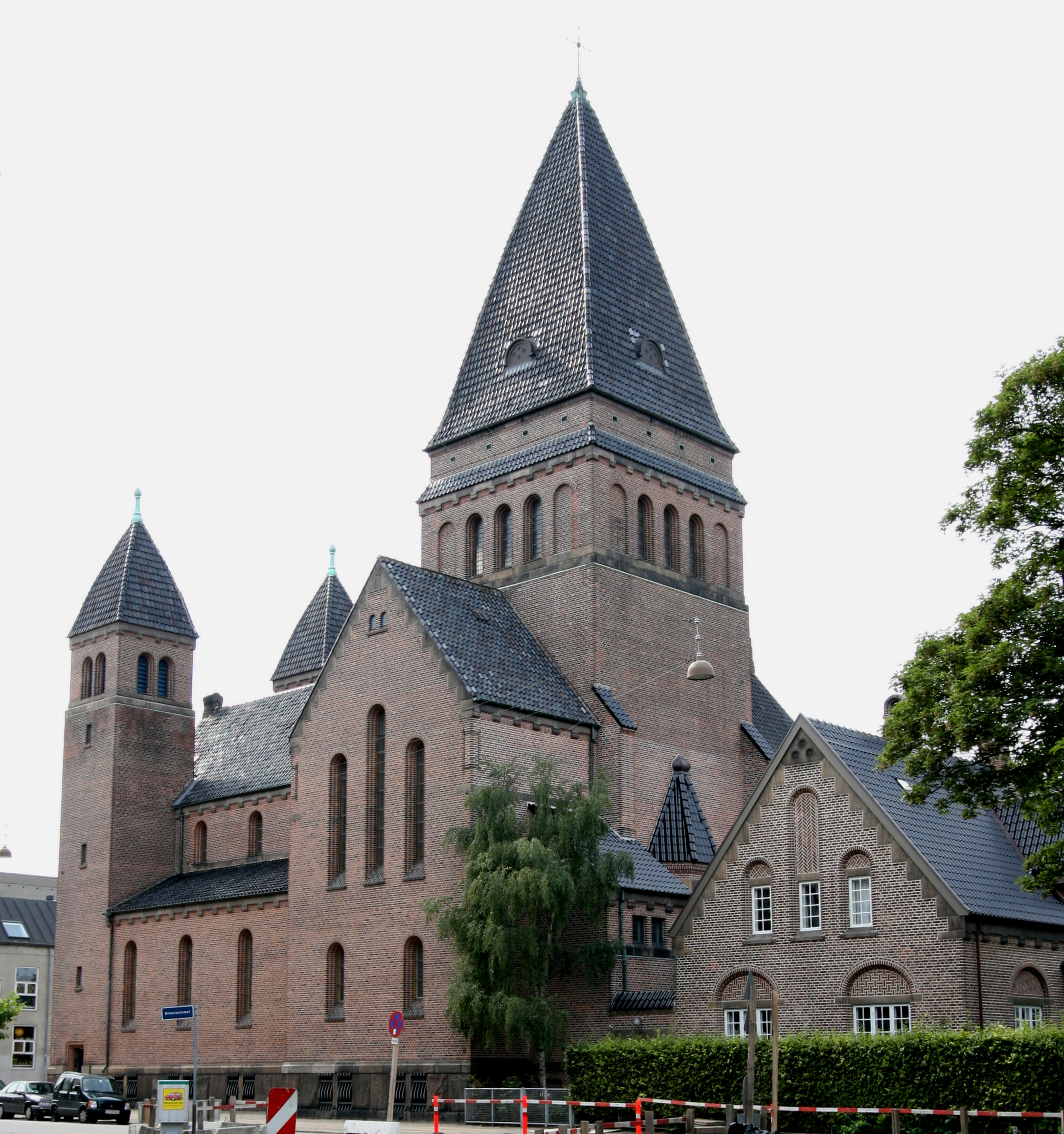
- Isaiah Church
- Isaiah Church
- 55°41′32.51″N 12°34′42″E
- Location: 14 Malmøgade; Nørrebro, Copenhagen
- Country: Denmark
- Denomination: Protestant

History
- Status: Church

Architecture
- Architect: Thorvald Jørgensen
- Architectural type: Church
- Style: Historicist
- Groundbreaking: 1903
- Completed: 1912

Specifications
- Materials: Brick

Administration
- Diocese: Diocese of Copenhagen

Isaiah Church (Danish: Esajas Kirke) is a Lutheran church in the Østerbro district of Copenhagen, Denmark.

== History ==
The Isaiah Church is located in Østervold Parish which was disjoined from St. James' Parish in 1903. Thorvald Jørgensen who had already designed several churches in Copenhagen was charged with the design and the church was consecrated in 1912.

== Architecture ==
The cruciform church is designed in Late Romanesque Revival style. It is built in red brick with granite ashlar masonry along the ground and on the corners. The central tower is topped by a pyramidal spire and the western cross arm ends in two smaller towers which also have pyramidal spires. To the east the church ends in a small three-sided apsis.

The main entrance below the two western towers is decorated with a granite portal flanked by two angels designed by Anders Bundgaard. Above the main entrance there is a gallery of five round-arched windows separated by granite columns.

== Interior ==
The nave is divided into three by columns in masonry with limestone capitals. The central nave and choir arms are barrel vaulted and the lateral naves are groin vaulted.

Behind the altar, in the small apsis, there are three glass paintings made by Joakim Skovgaard in 1914.

== See also ==
- Architecture of Denmark
