= Mariendal Church =

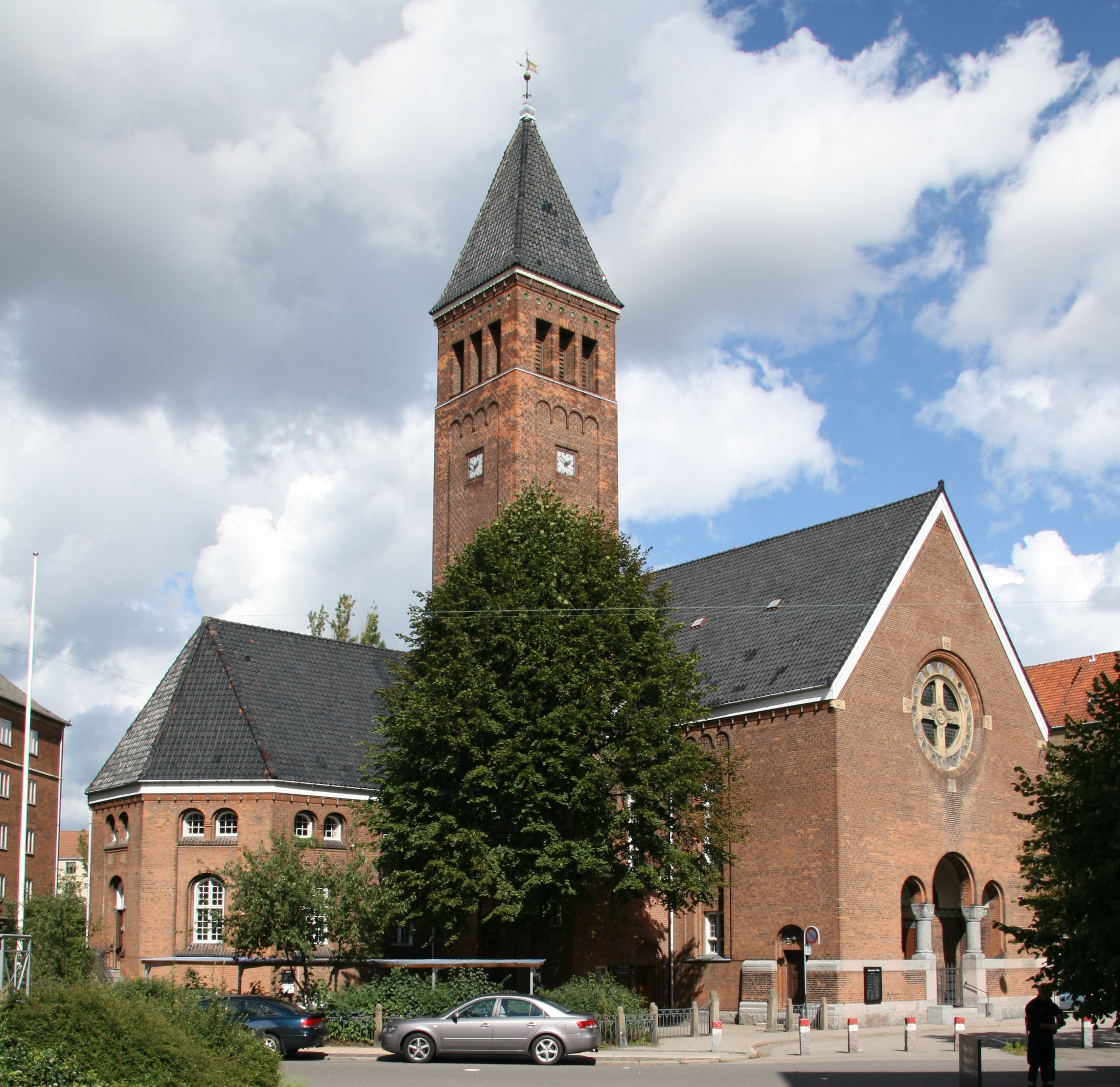
- Church of Christ seen from across the street
- Mariendal Church
- 55°41′31.1″N 12°32′4.4″E
- Location: 17 Nitivej; Frederiksberg, Copenhagen
- Country: Denmark
- Denomination: Church of Denmark

History
- Status: Church

Architecture
- Architect: Thorvald Jørgensen
- Architectural type: Church
- Completed: 1908

Specifications
- Materials: Brick

Administration
- Archdiocese: Diocese of Copenhagen

Mariendal Church (Danish: Mariendals Kirke) is a church in the Frederiksberg district of Copenhagen, Denmark.

== History ==
Mariendal parish was disjoined from that of St. Thomas' in 1905 when the owners of the Mariendal estate, Niels and Thora Josephsen, donated the building site and most of the funds needed for constructing the church and the parish hall. The street name Nitivej is a concentration of the couple's initials, "NJTJ". The Copenhagen Church Foundation erected a temporary church in coconut coir, a mixture of fibers from coconut and plaster, which was moved to a new church project in 1908.

== Architecture ==
The present Mariendal Church is built to a Historicist design. It stands on a granite plinth and a rose window and a loggia dominate the facade.

== Interior ==
The barrel vaulted church room has a carved choir pulpit and wooden galleries in Art Nouveau style on three sides. In a crypt under the choir rest the remains of Niels and Thora Josephsen. Knud Larsen's original altarpiece has been integrated in a new decoration of the church's choir which was carried out in 1988 by artist Mogens Jørgensen.

The font by Siegfried Wagner is in granite with bronze-plate. The altar silver is endowed with jewels from Thora Josephsen's personal jewellery.
