= M1923 helmet (Denmark) =

Danish combat helmet

M/1923 Helmet
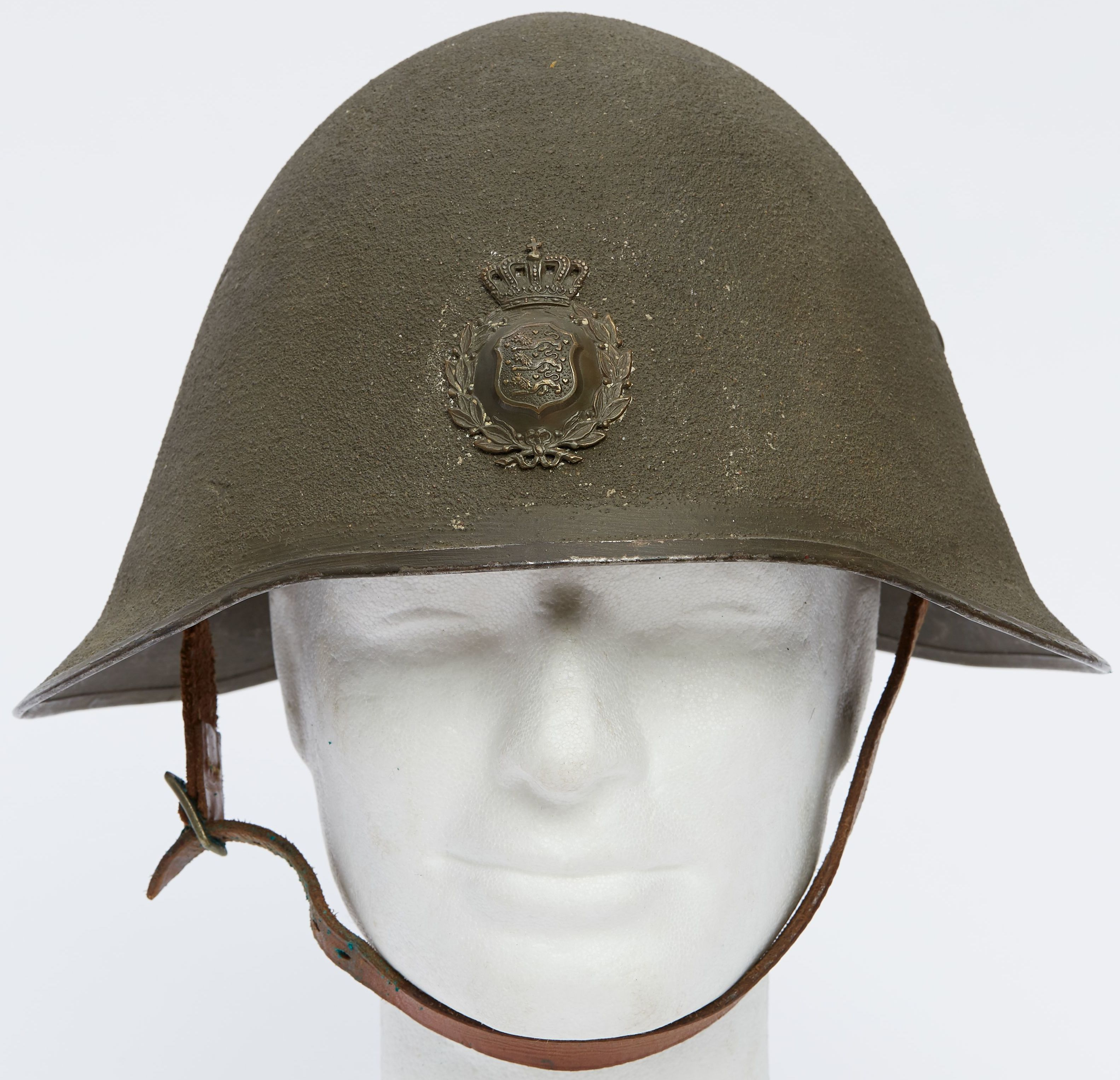
- M/1923 Helmet
- Type: Combat helmet
- Place of origin: Denmark

Service history
- In service: 1923–1948
- Used by: Royal Danish Army; Royal Danish Navy
- Wars: Second World War; Winter War

Production history
- Designer: H.E. Johnsen; G.A.P. Willadsen-Nielsen
- Designed: 1923; Changes made in: 1924; 1926; 1929
- Manufacturer: A/S Glud & Marstrands Fabrikker
- Produced: 1923–1946
- No. produced: 105,300 (all versions) The number of civilian M/1923/41 helmets are unknown.
- Variants: M/1923; M/1923/24; M/1923/26; M/1923/29; Civilian M/1923/41

Specifications
- Weight: 1.2–1.8 kg (2 lb 10 oz – 3 lb 15 oz)
- Length: 276–310 mm (10.87–12.20 in)
- Width: 272–286 mm (10.71–11.26 in)
- Height: 139–182 mm (5.47–7.17 in)

Danish M/1923 Helmet with M1 Style liner - CF reissue

The M/1923 helmet was a combat helmet issued to Danish troops during the interwar period and saw service in the Second World War. It was the first helmet to be issued to the Royal Danish Army and Navy. The helmet was produced by the Danish company A/S Glud & Marstrands Fabrikker.

== Design ==
The M/1923 was made from a single piece of Swedish steel and was produced in both military and civilian versions. The military version contained either an Army or Navy emblem on the front, depending upon which branch it was issued to. A first variant, of which only a couple of thousand pieces were produced, had two ventilation holes in the back of the shell which were omitted in the second variant. Army emblems were produced by prisoners at Vridsløselille Prison. From the 1930s the helmets were covered with textured grey or a light shade of khaki paint. The inside of the helmet was equipped with a leather chin strap and liner consisting of eight flaps. On the rear of the helmet, there is a slit allowing for a carabiner to be attached to the soldier's equipment, when the helmet was not worn.

=== Civilian versions ===
During the Second World War a number of different versions of civilian M/1923 helmets were made. They are among collectors known as the M1923/41. It is plausible that Glud & Marstrand made the M/1923/41, as they already had the machinery tooled for the production of the army helmets. The civilian version was issued to various non-military organizations such as, police, fire departments, and the press. The civilian version did not have a decal on the front, and was made from lighter steel. It had a lower quality liner and chin strap. Unlike the military version it remained in service with these groups and the Civil Defence after the war.

== History and usage ==
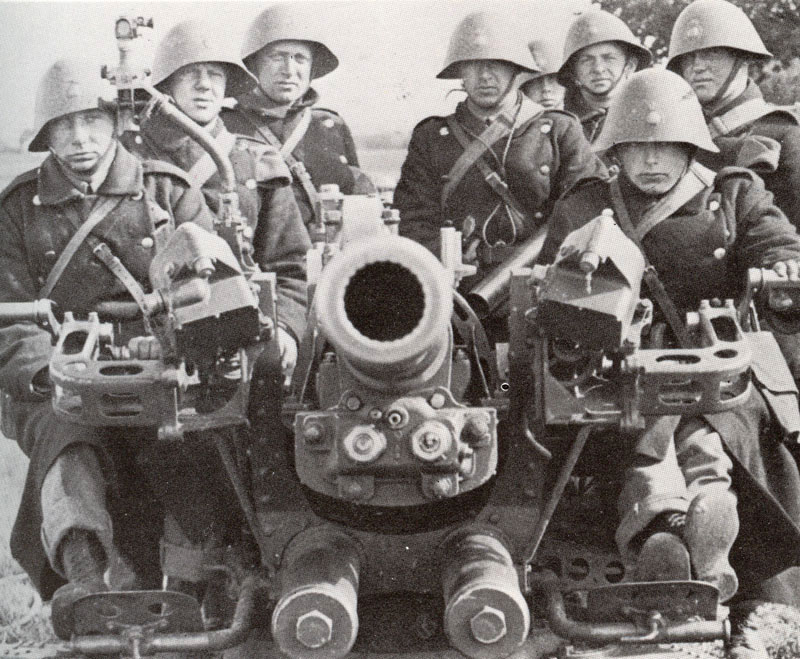
Danish soldiers wearing M/1923 helmets at an AA gun

Following World War I the Danish government fell into line with other industrialized nations and began to equip their soldiers with steel helmets. This new trend emerged from the trenches of World War I where steel helmets greatly reduced casualties. The Danish military accepted plans for the helmet in 1923 from army Captain H. E. Johnsen and chief engineer G.A.P. Willadsen-Nielsen. The helmet saw combat during the German invasion of Denmark, Operation Weserübung, on April 9 1940, and very limited use with the Danish volunteers in Finland during the Winter War.

Following the end of the war in 1945, Denmark gradually phased out the M/1923 in favour of the M/48 steel helmet, which was modelled after the American M1 helmet. This move coincided with many other NATO members who adopted the same design. The M/1923 is unique in that it was never exported internationally making Denmark the only country ever to use it. This contrasts with other helmets of the era such as the French Adrian helmet and the British Brodie helmet, which were widely distributed around the world. Moreover, this helmet's distinctive appearance makes it easily recognizable from other interwar steel helmets.

== See also ==
- Uniforms of the Royal Danish Army
