= Gentofte Fire Station =

Coordinates: 55.7485°N 12.5564°E

- Gentofte Brandstation
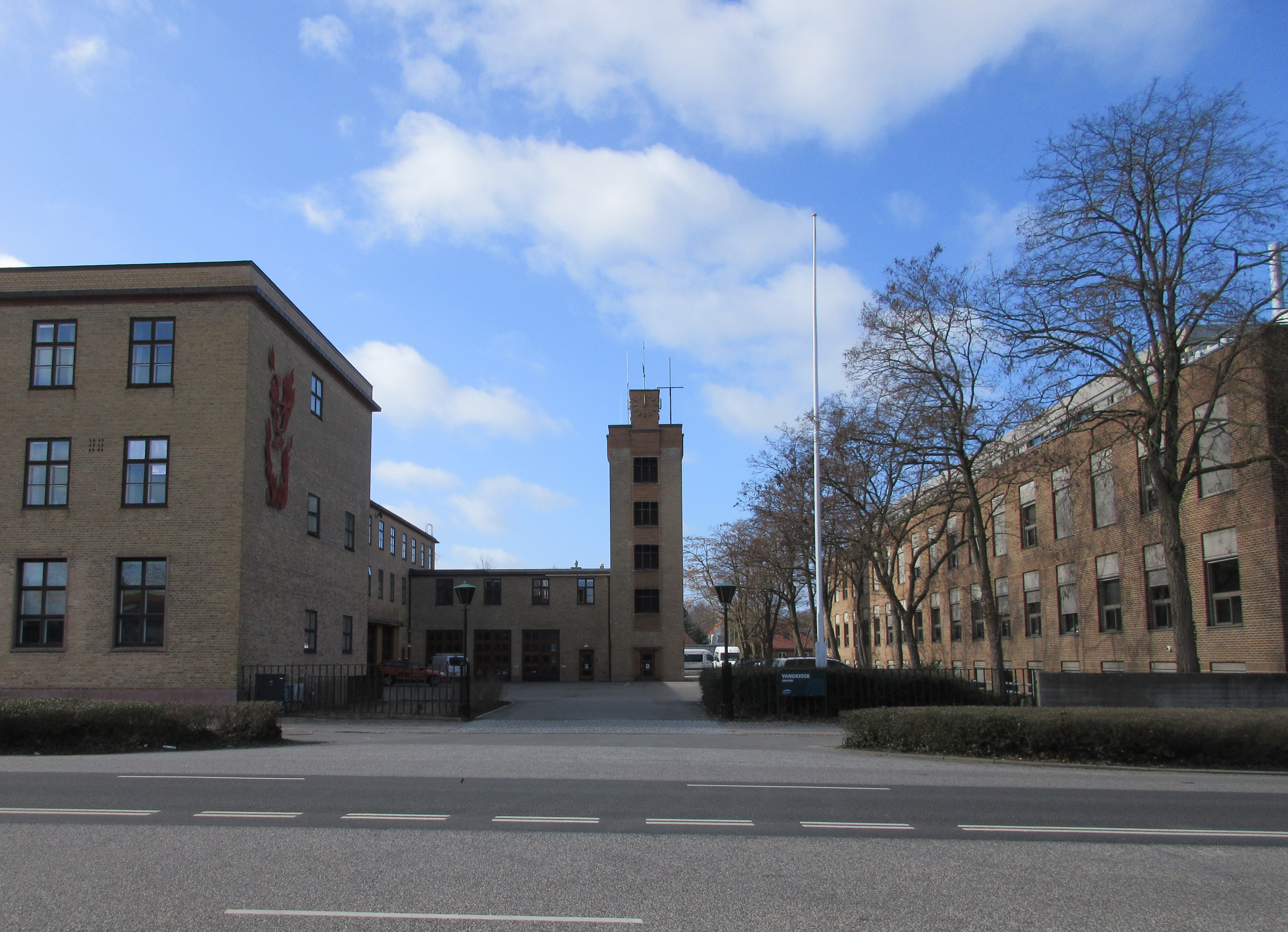
- Interactive map of the Gentofte Fire Station area

General information
- Architectural style: Functionalism
- Location: Gentofte Municipality, Denmark
- Completed: 1939

Design and construction
- Architects: Thorvald Jørgensen and Kaj Rasmussen

Gentofte Fire Station (Danish: Gentofte Brandstation) is situated adjacent to Gentofte Town Hall on Bernstorffsvej in Gentofte Municipality, Greater Copenhagen, Denmark. It is operated by Beredskab Øst.

== History ==
Gentofte Fire Department was founded on 17 May 1902 with volunteer personnel at six local fire stations (sprøjtehuse) in Gentofte, Ordrup, Skovshovede, Hellerup, Jægersborg and Vangede. The fire station in Hellerup, which had more tall buildings, acquired a 26 ft ladder. One of the firemen, Søren Christensen, made two motorcycles available to the fire station in 1903.

In 1905, Gentofte Fire Department acquired its first motorized fire engine. A second fire engine, an Anglo Dane, was acquired in 1907.

A new central fire and police station was inaugurated at Hellerupvej 55 in 1909. A Dennis fire engine was acquired in 1911, and professional fire fighters were engaged on part-time contracts. The fire station was expanded in 1919, and a new fire engine and a 25 m automatic ladder were also acquired.

A new fire station was inaugurated on 16 June 1939.

== Artworks ==
At the entrance to the fire station is a relief by the artist Herlge Holmskov, entitled The Red Cock (Denn Røde Hane). The 4.5 m tall relief resembles a composition of flames of which the upper part forms the silhouette of a cock. It was unveiled on 17 May 1977 in connection with the 75-year anniversary of the fire department.

The tower is topped by a weather vane in copper by the artist Jais Nielsens. It depicts a fireman fighting a fire while protected a woman.

== See also ==
- Copenhagen Fire Department
