= Gentofte Town Hall =

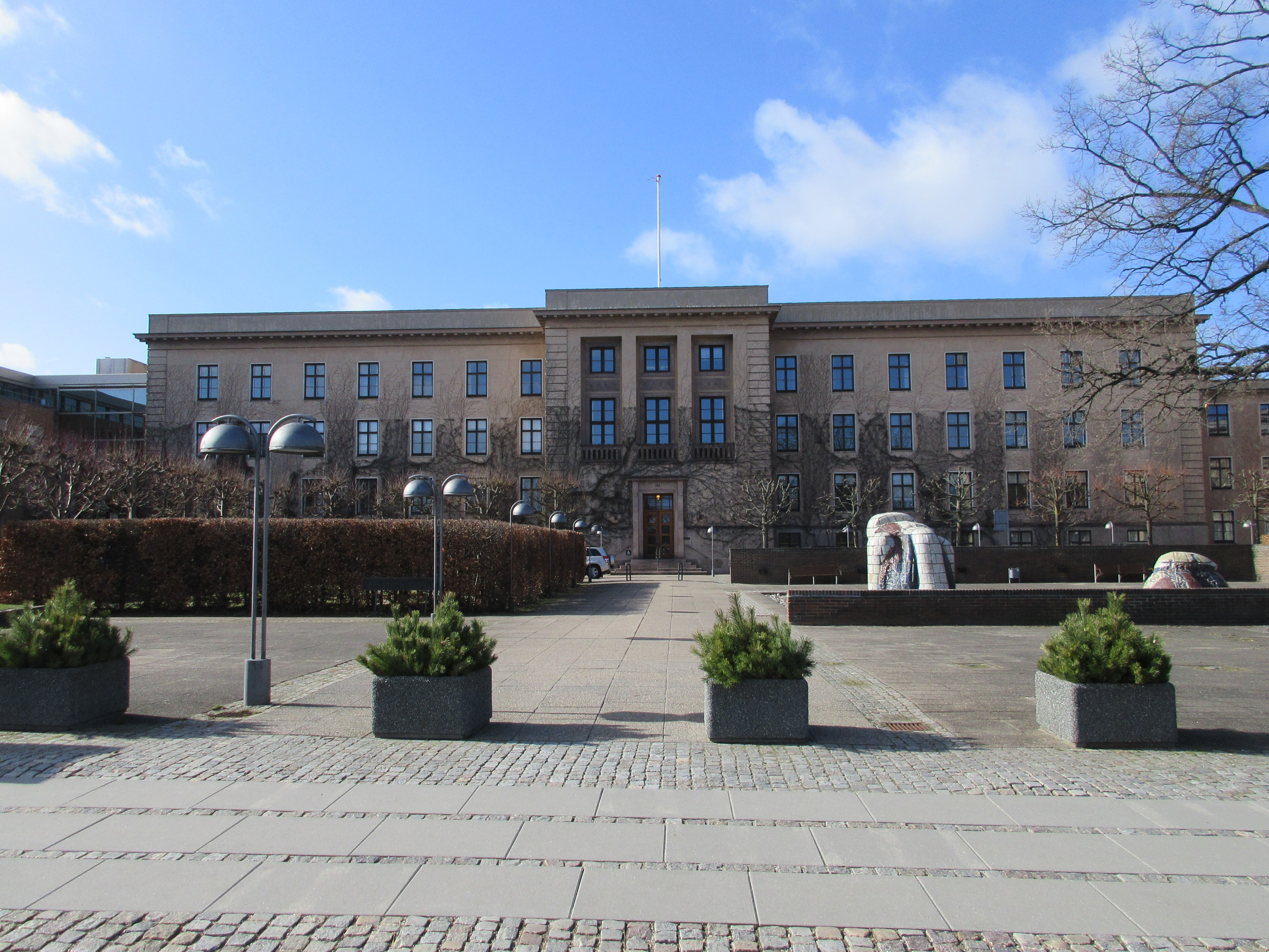
- Interactive map of the Gentofte Town Hall area

General information
- Type: Administrative
- Architectural style: Neoclassical
- Location: Charlottenlund, Denmark
- Coordinates: 55.749417°N 12.556111°E
- Completed: 1936

Design and construction
- Architect: Thorvald Jørgensen

Gentofte Town Hall (Danish: Gentofte Rådhus) is the administrative centre of Gentofte Municipality in the northern suburbs of Copenhagen, Denmark. The main building is from 1939 and is situated on Bernstorffsvej. Gentofte Fire Station is situated next to the town hall.

== History ==
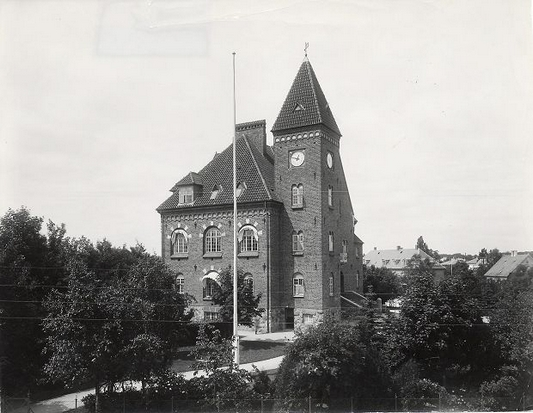
The old Gentofte Town Hall in 1915

Gentofte's former town hall was constructed in 1903. It was located at the corner of L.E. Bruunsvej and Rådhusvej and had already been too small 15 years after it was inaugurated.

In 1934, the civil parish of Gentofte (Gentofte Sognekommune) obtained a status similar to that of a market town. Gentofte's first mayor was colonel Parkov. It was decided to build a new town hall and the architect Thorvald Jørgensen was selected for the project. A site on Bernstorffsvej was selected for the new building. It had become free after a farm, Maltegården, had been destroyed in a fire a few years earlier.

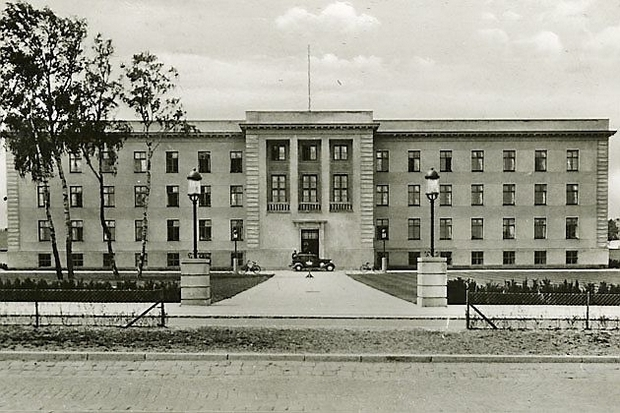
The new Gentofte Town Hall in 1937

The new town hall was inaugurated on 17 December 1936. The inauguration was attended by prime minister Thorvald Stauning. It was initially surrounded by fields but they were soon built over with single family detached homes. Up through the 1930s, Gentofte's population grew from 46,000 to 75,000 residents. In 1944 the town hall had once again become too small and was there expanded with a new north wing. The municipal administration continued to grow up through the 1950s. In 1976 Gentofte Town Hall was expanded with a new south wing.

== Architecture ==
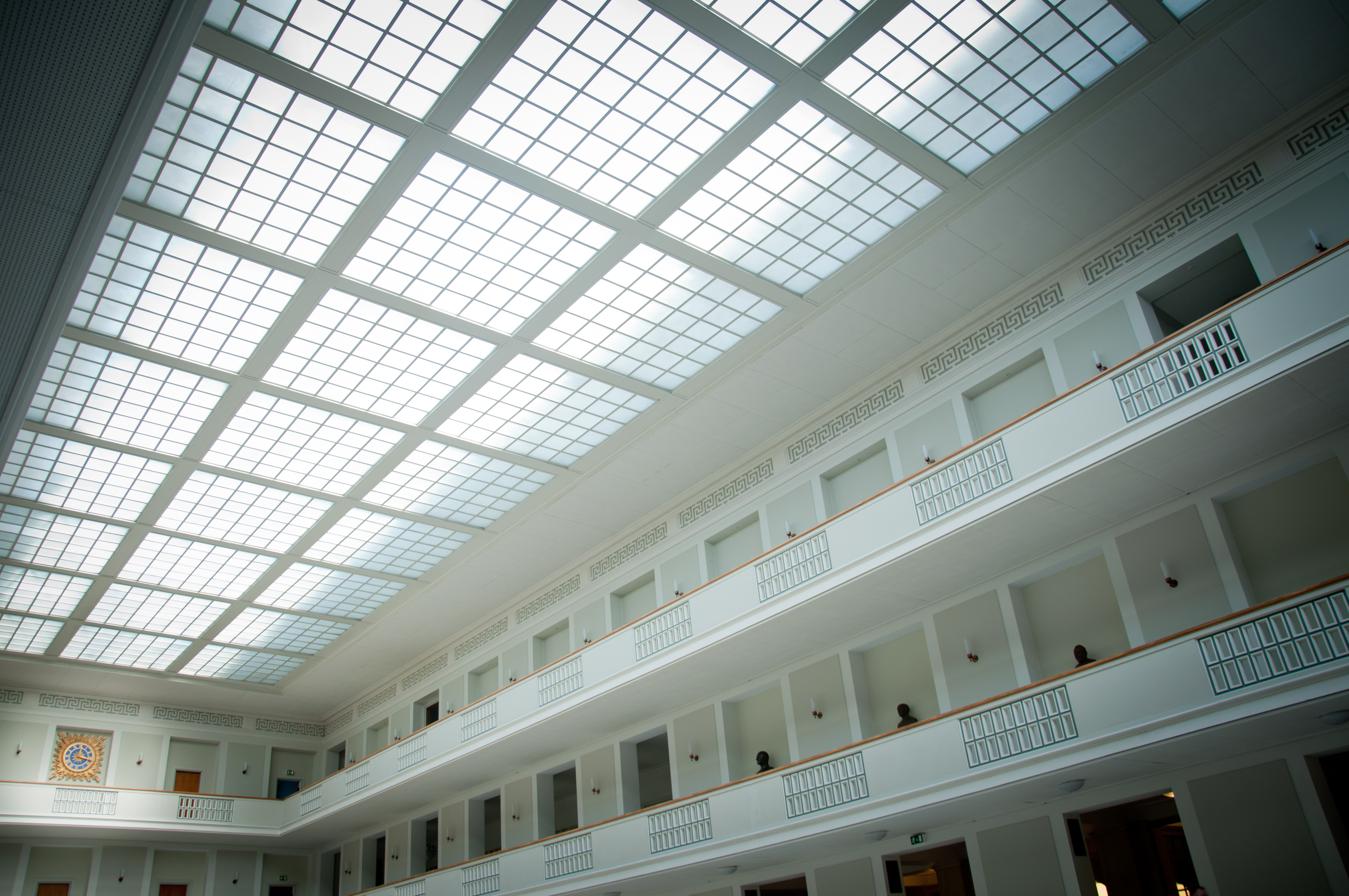
The new Gentofte Town Hall in 1937

Gentofte Town Hall is designed in the Neoclassical style.

=== Water feature ===
In the space in front of the town hall stands a water feature. It was created by Allan Smidt and was inaugurated on 1 October 1978. It is an abstract sculpture with two organic figures and consists of circa 500 glazed ceramic tiles in white, blue and reddish-brown colours. The tallest figure is 2.5 metres tall. The sculpture was created in collaboration with Royal Copenhagen.

== Today ==
Gentofte Town Hall is home to Gentofte Municipal Council as well as the municipal administration. It is also used for exhibitions and concerts.
