= Nathanael's Church =

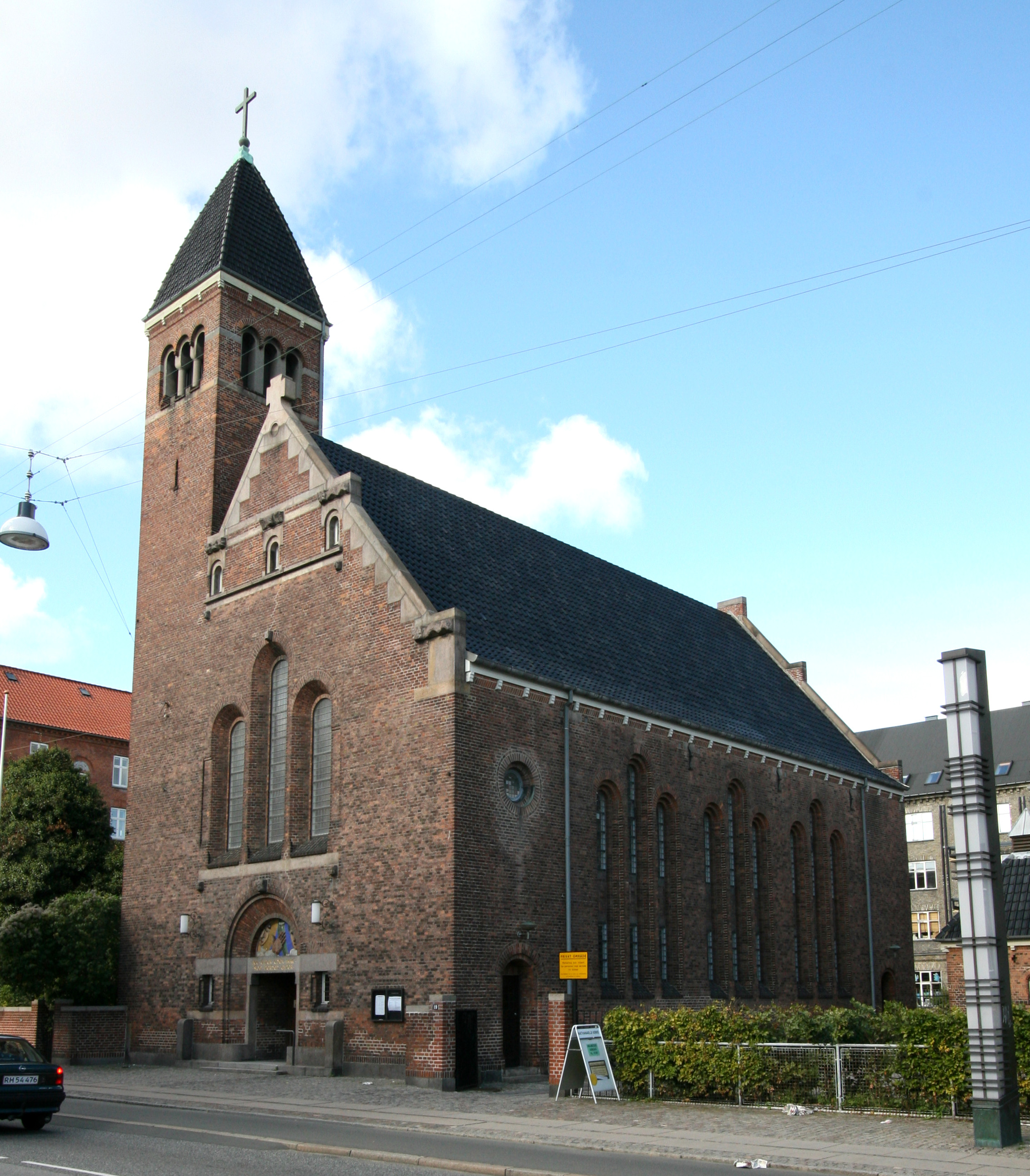
- Nathanael's Church seen from Holmbladsgade
- Nathanael's Church
- 55°39′53.62″N 12°36′16.08″E
- Location: 19 Holmbladsgade; Copenhagen
- Country: Denmark
- Denomination: Church of Denmark

History
- Status: Church

Architecture
- Architect: Thorvald Jørgensen
- Architectural type: Church
- Groundbreaking: 1897
- Completed: 1899

Specifications
- Materials: Brick

Administration
- Archdiocese: Diocese of Copenhagen

Nathanael's Church (Danish: Nathanaels Kirke) is a Church of Denmark parish church in Holmbladsgade in Amager, Copenhagen, Denmark.

== History ==
Nathanael's Parish was disjoined from Sundby Parish in 1899 as a consequence of the rapid growth of the population in the surrounding working-class neighborhood. The church was built at the initiative of the Association for the Construction of Small Churches in Copenhagen, which had been founded by three young women in 1885. As was the case with the other churches built by the association, it was handed over to the Copenhagen Church Foundation on its completion, which then took care of its operation.

The foundation stone for the new church had already been set on 14 June and it was consecrated on 19 March 1899. The church was designed by Thorvald Jørgensen, who would later also design a number of other churches in Copenhagen as well as the current Christiansborg Palace which was built in 1915 after its predecessor was destroyed in a fire.

== Architecture ==
Oriented south-north, the church is designed in a Neo-Romanesque style. It is built in red brick on a plinth of granite from Bornholm. The main entrance is in the south gable. The Tympanum is now decorated with a glass mosaic created by William Fridericia in 1986. It depicts Nathanael's meeting with Jesus as described in John 1–35. There are nine tall, rounded windows, arranged in groups of three, with the middle ones somewhat taller than the others, on both sides of the church building. The bell tower is at the south-west corner of the building. The openings of the bell chamber is divided into three by two columns supporting rounded arches.

== Interior ==
The nave has a barrel-vaulted ceiling with moulded ornamentation. There are galleries along its east and west sides.
