= Thorvald Jørgensen =

Danish architect (1867–1946)

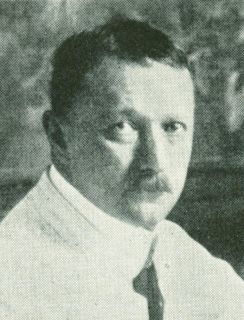
- Sophus Frederik Kühnel, c. 1911
- Born: 27 June 1867; Norsminde, Denmark
- Died: 15 May 1946 (aged 78); Charlottenlund, Denmark
- Education: Royal Danish Academy of Fine Arts
- Occupation: Architect
- Buildings: Christiansborg

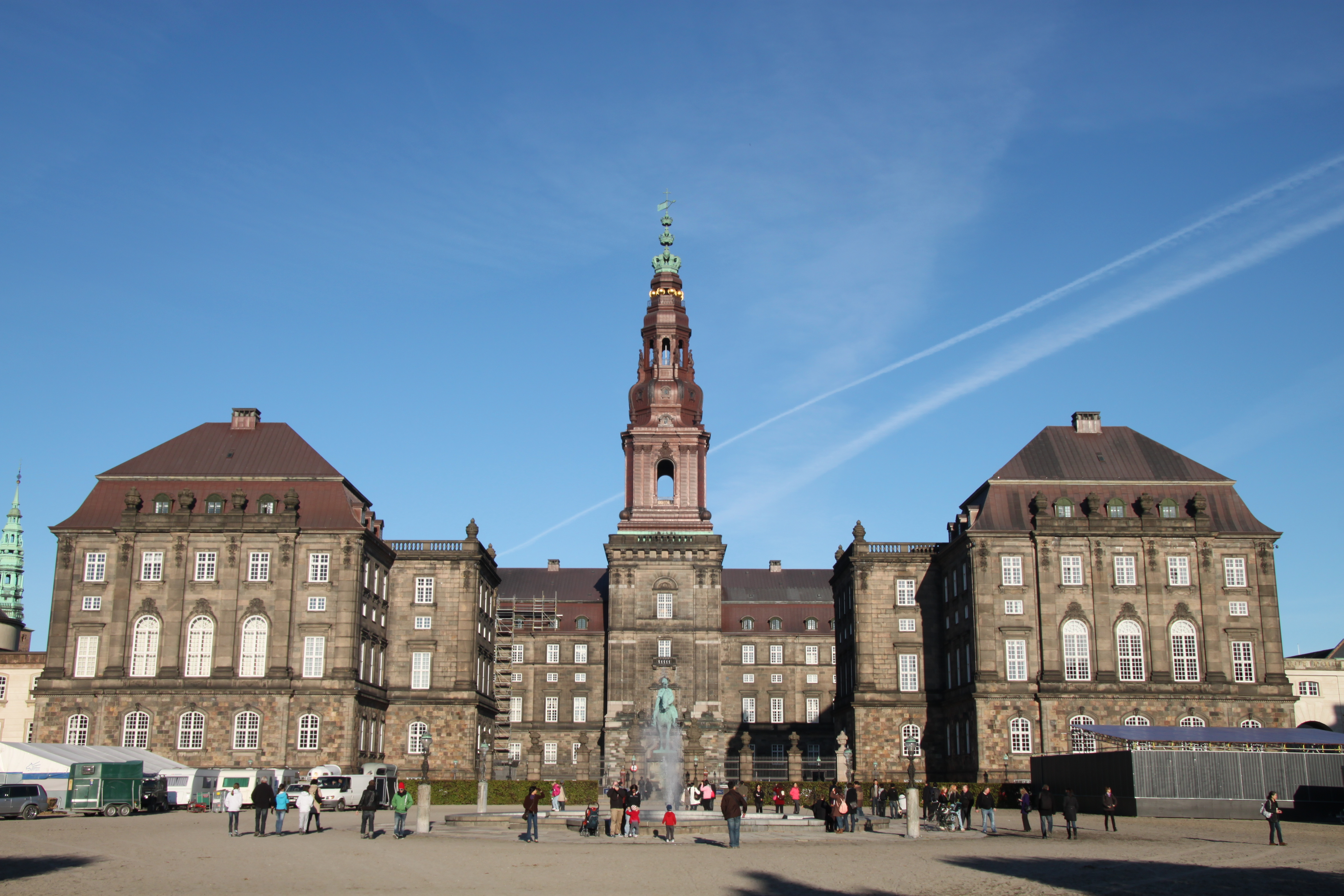
Christiansborg Palace in Copenhagen, Thorvald Jørgen's most prominent work

Thorvald Jørgensen (27 June 1867 - 15 May 1946) was a Danish architect, most known for his design of Christiansborg Palace, the seat of the Danish Parliament, after it had been destroyed in a fire. He has also designed a number of churches in Copenhagen. He was Royal Building Inspector from 1911 to 1938.

== Early life and education ==
Thorval Jørgen was born in Norsminde outside Aarhus, Denmark. He completed a carpenter's apprenticeship in Aarhus in 1885 and then moved to Copenhagen where he was admitted to the Royal Danish Academy of Fine Arts the same year, where he was taught by Hans Jørgen Holm, Martin Nyrop, Ferdinand Meldahl and Albert Jensen. He graduated in 1889, won the Academy's large gold medal in 1893 for A church with rectory, and then worked for Hans Jørgen Holm on the Overformynderiet institution building in Copenhagen from 1892 to 1893. In 1892 he received the Academy's scholarship and over the next years travelled widely in Europe, particularly in Italy.

== Career ==
From the turn of the century, he designed a number of churches in and around Copenhagen. His design of Brorson's Church was rewarded with the Eckersberg Medal.

In 1905 he won the competition for the design of the new Christiansborg Palace after Christian Frederik Hansen's previous Christiansborg Palace had been destroyed in a fire. Construction started the next year but before the building was completed in 1928 after a prolonged and difficult political process, the design had changed considerable from Jørgensen's original winning proposal. It was met with strong criticism.

In 1911 Jørgensen was appointed Royal Building Inspector. The rest of his works were mainly churches and public buildings but also a number of villas and country houses.

== Style ==
With influence from his teachers from the Academy, Holm and Nyrop, Jørgen belonged to the Herholdt-Holmske group of Danish Historicist architects which relied on Medieval Danish architecture for inspiration, rather than Ferdinand Meldahl's more internationally inclined followers.

Later he turned to Neo-Baroque (Christiansborg Palace) and Neoclassicism (Gentofte Town Hall). Hellerup Church shows influence from Art Nouveau (Jugendstil).

== Selected buildings ==
- Nathanael's Church, Amager, Copenhagen (1900)
- Skt Annæ Hus, Sankt Annæ Plads 16, Copenhagen(1898)
- Brorson's Church, Copenhagen (1898–1901)
- Hellerup Church, Hellerup (1899–1900)
- Grenens Badehotel, Skagen (1899–1900, later burnt)
- Kochsvej 18 (villa), Frederiksberg, Copenhagen (1900)
- Viggo Rothes Vej 31 (villa), Charlottenlund (1901)
- Community house, St. James' Church, Østerbro, Copenhagen (1901–02)
- Brønshøj Rectory, Brønshøj, Copenhagen (1902)
- Tuxens Allé 16 (redesign of the painter Laurits Tuxen's house, Skagen (1902)
- Isaiah Church, Malmøgade, Copenhagen (1903–12)
- Tram waiting room, Rådhuspladsen, Copenhagen (1903, moved to 43 Stokholmsvej in Mørdrup pr. Espergærde, 1948)
- Mogens Frijs' Mansion (redesign), Ny Kongensgade 1, Copenhagen (1903–04)
- Danske Sygeplejerskers Rekreationshjem, Smidstrup at Vedbæk (1904)
- Skagens Apotek, Skagen (1904)
- hurch of the Freeport, Willemoesgade, Copenhagen (1904–05)
- Rectory, Vanløse Church, Vabløse (1905)
- Royal Library Garden, Slotsholmen (1906, with Johannes Magdahl Nielsen)
- Christiansborg Palace, Slotsholmen, Copenhagen (1906–28)
- Værnedamsvej/Gammel Kongevej (residential building), Frederiksberg (1906)
- Trianglen 2–4 (residential building), Østerbro, Copenhagen (1906)
- Bukkeballevej 6 (country house), Strandvejen, Rungsted (1907)
- Mariendal Church, Nitivej, Frederiksberg (1907–08)
- Villa Guldmaj, Åkandevej 19, Skagen (1911)[1]
- Varde Museum, Varde (1913–14)
- Post- og Telegrafvæsenet workshops and garages, 40-44 Amager Fælledvej, Amager, Copenhagen (1919)
- Østerbros Post Office, Øster Allé 1, Østerbro, Copenhagen (1921–22)
- Christiansborg Chapel (restoration), (1921 and 32)
- Post Giro Building (redesign of existing building) 23 Holbergsgade, Copenhagen (1923)
- Korsør Church (new spire), Korsør (1924)
- Inspectorate for Tobacco Taxation, Frederiksholms Kanal, Copenhagen (1931)
- Gentofte Town Hall, Bernstorffsvej 161, Charlottenlund (1934–36)
- North Wing, Gentofte Town Hall, Charlottenlund (1942–44, with Kai Rasmussen)
- Posst Giro Building, Vester Voldgade 123, Copenhagen(1938)
- Gentofte Fire Station, Gentofte (1938 with Kai Rasmussen)

== Gallery ==
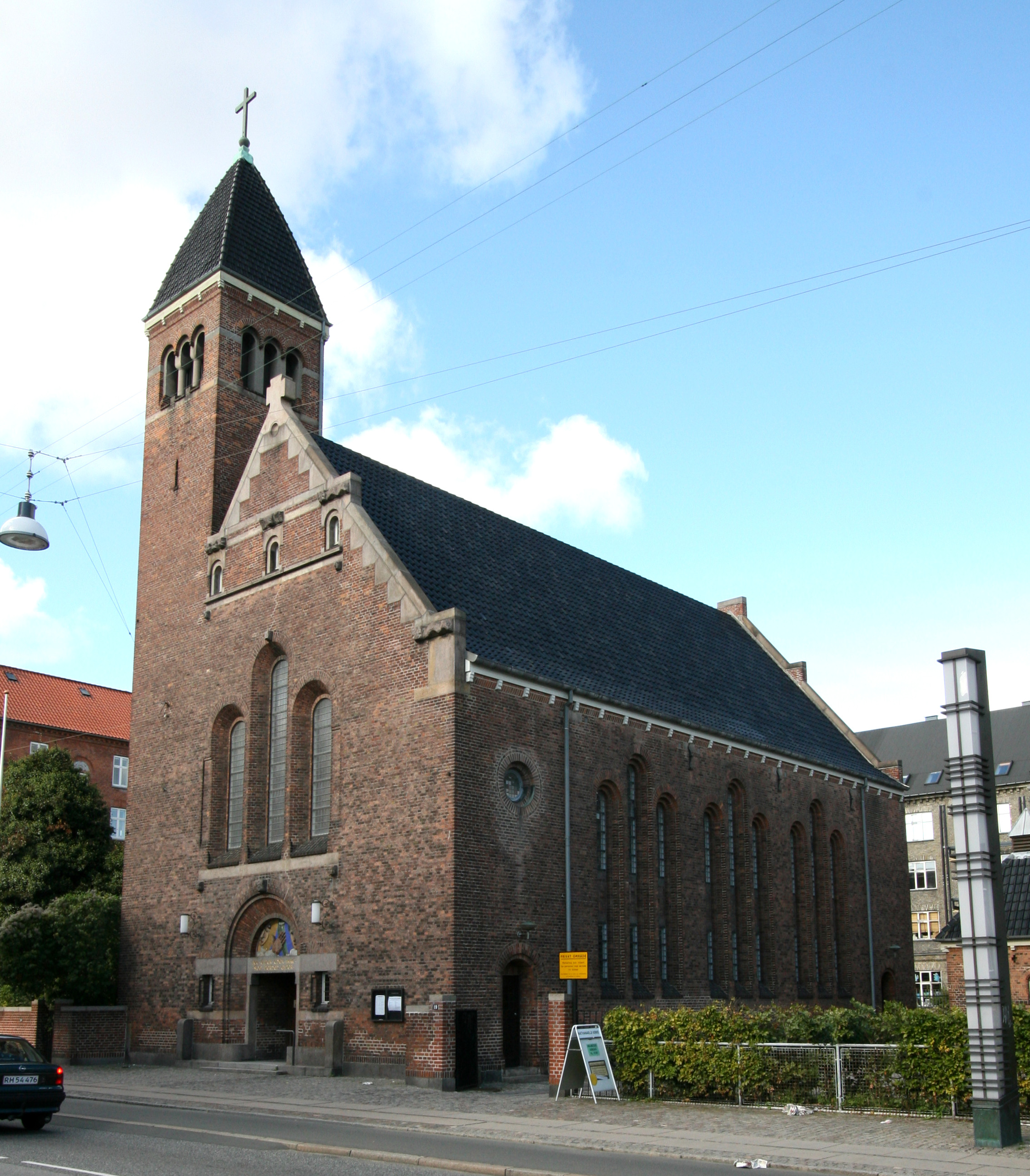
Nathanael's Church
1897–99

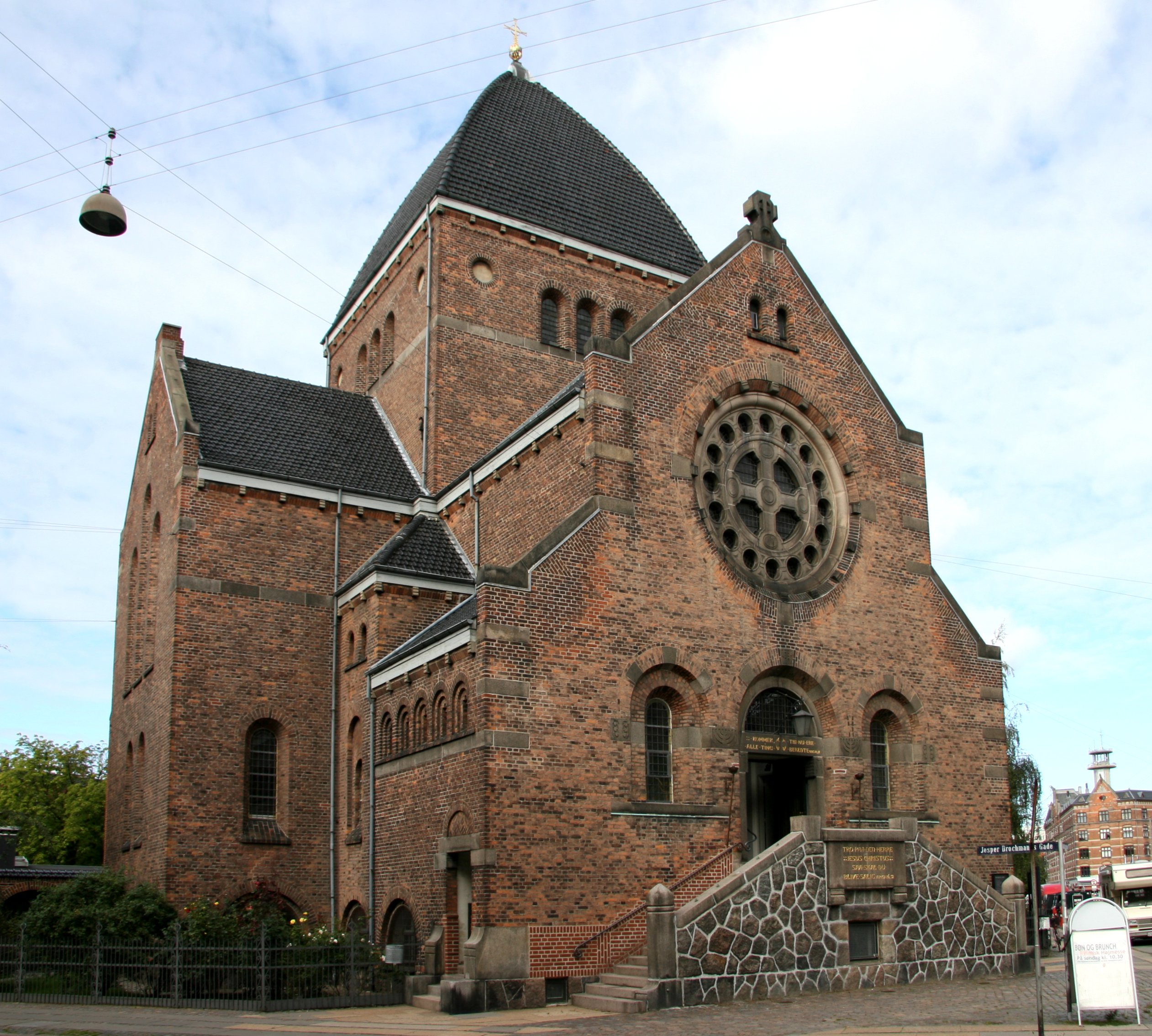
Brorson's Church
1898–1901

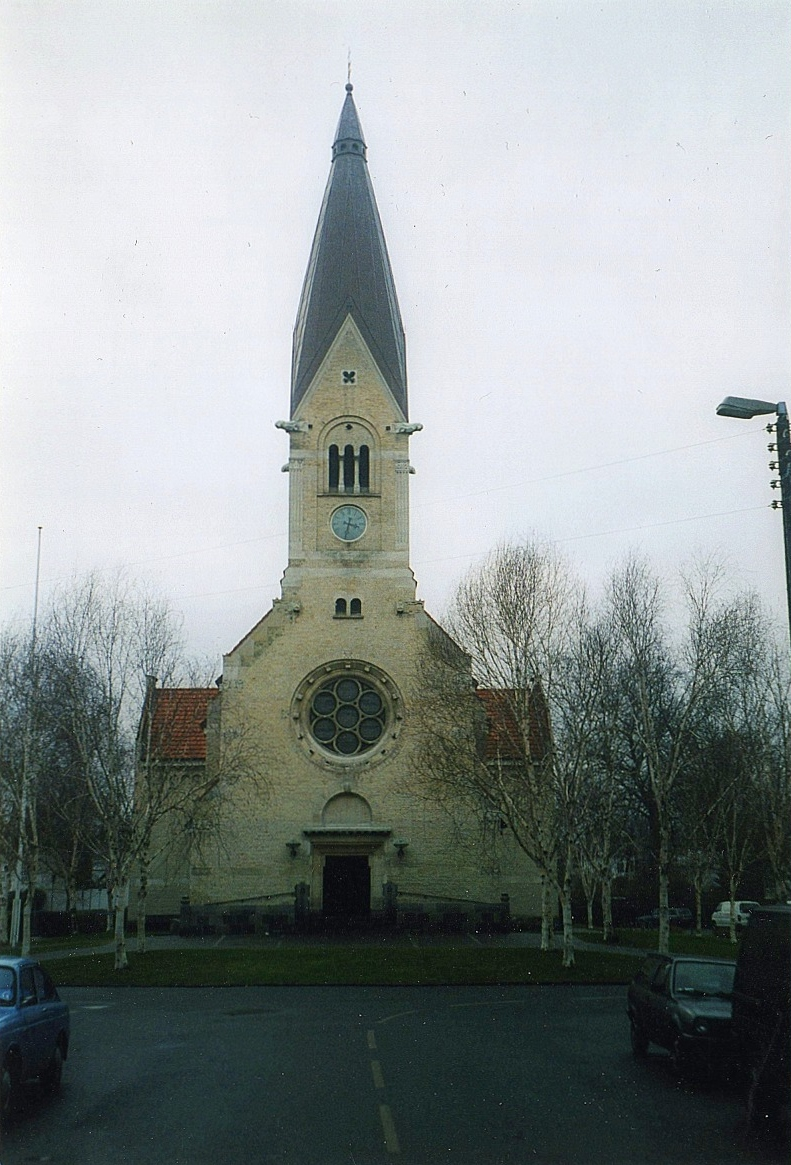
Hellerup Church
1899–1900

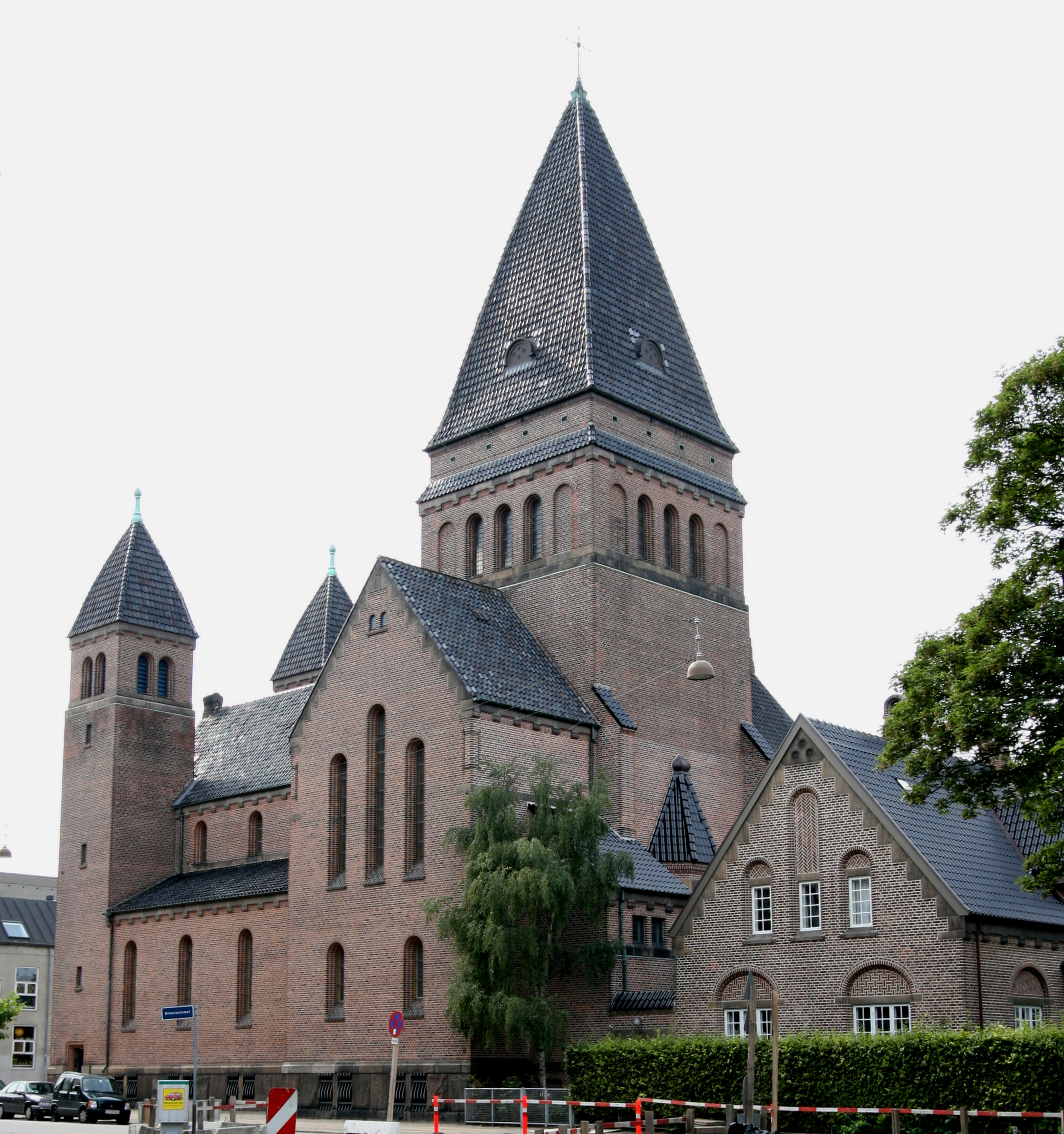
Isaiah Church
1903–12

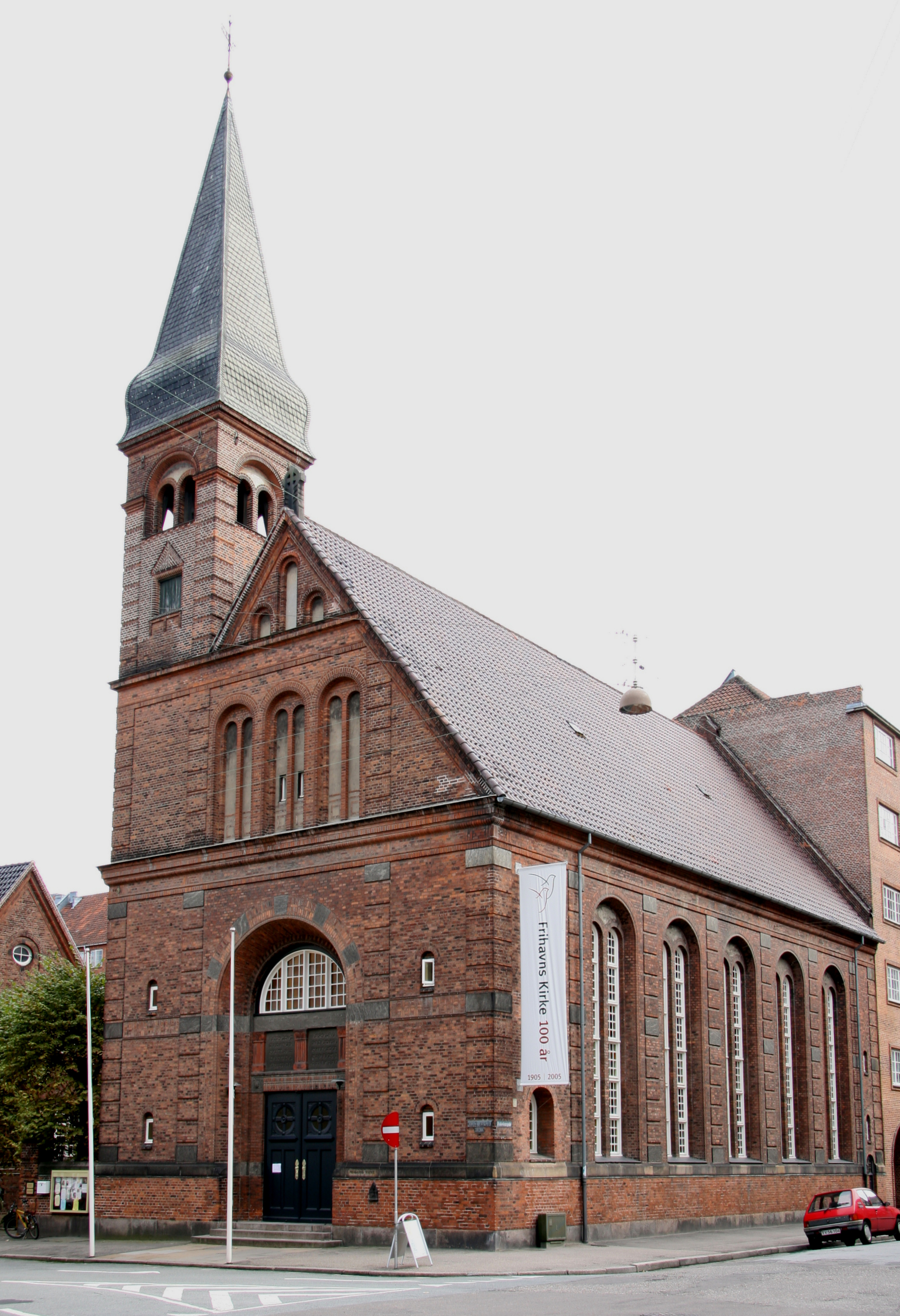
Frihavns Church
1904–05

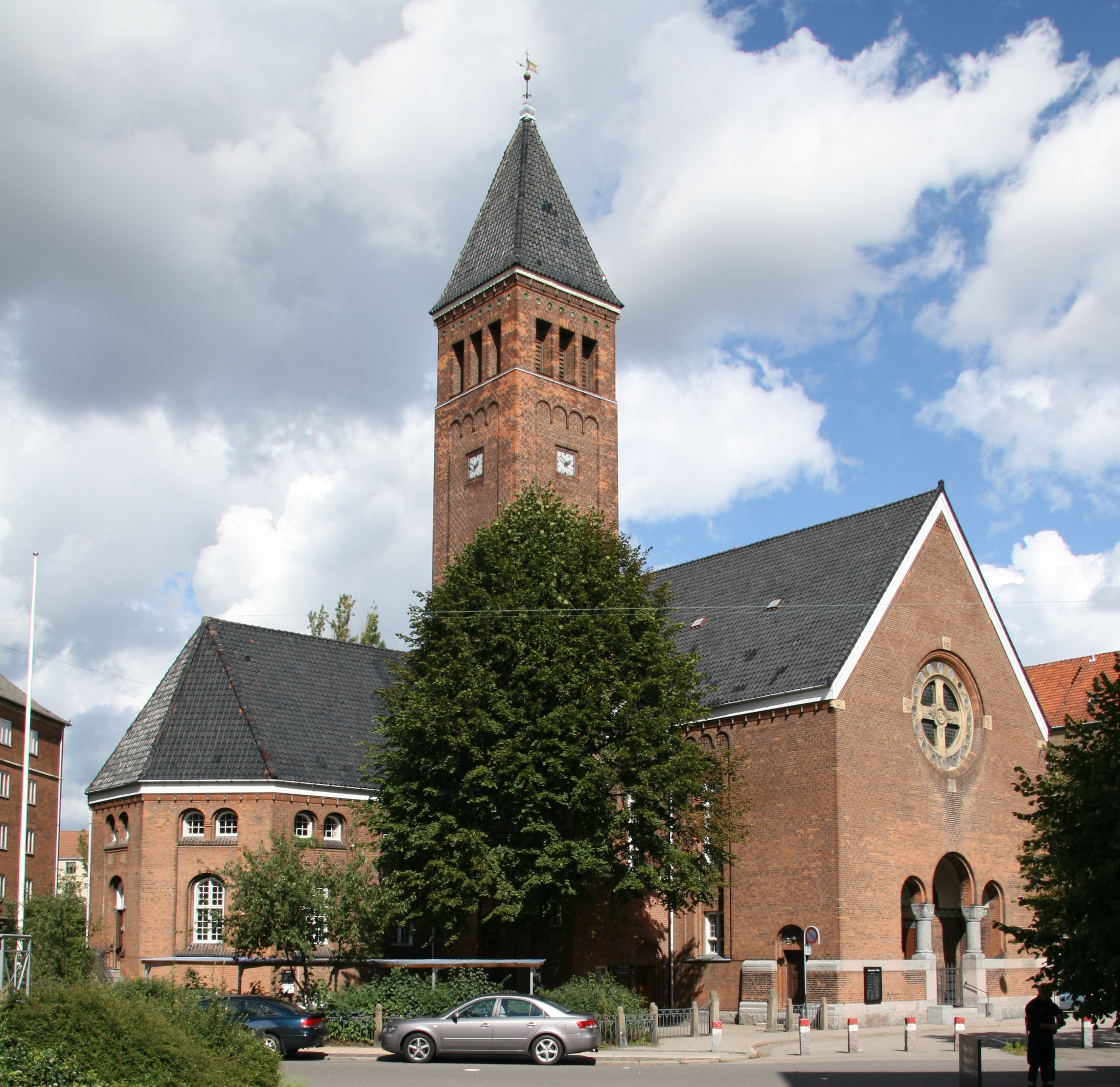
Mariendal Church
1907–08

== See also ==
- Architecture of Denmark
