= Glud & Marstrand =

Danish metal product manufacturer

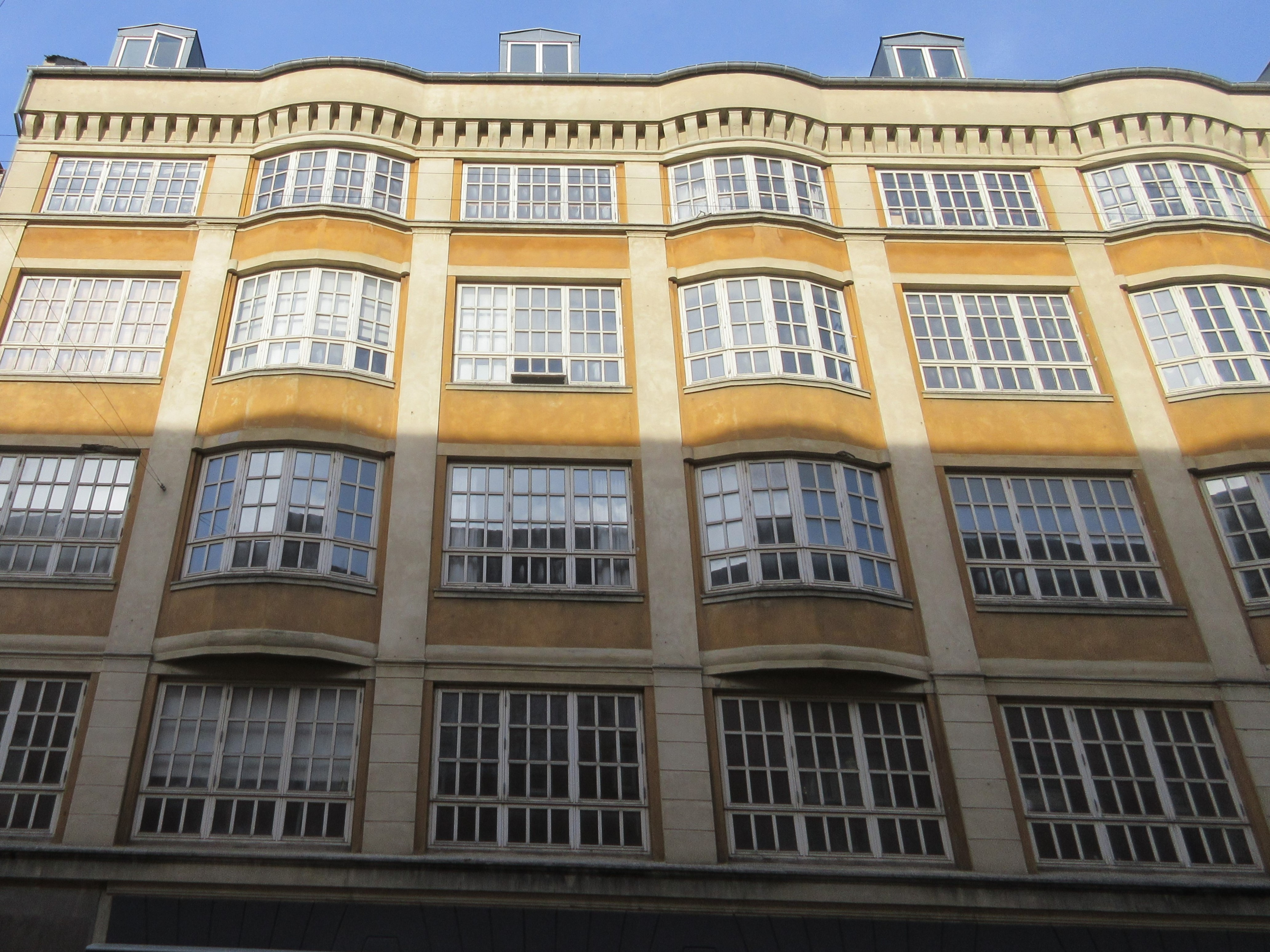
The company's former headquarters at Rantzausgade 22–24 in Copenhagen.

Glud & Marstrand was a manufacturer of metal products based in Copenhagen, Denmark.

== History ==
Glud & Marstrand was founded on 4 August 1879 by plumber Poul Glud (1850–1924) and ironmonger Troels Marstrand (1854–1929) as Glud & Marstrands Fabriker. The company was headquartered at Nordvestvej (now Rantzausgade) in Nørrebro. The site continued to Skolegade (now Struenseegade) on the other side of the block.In 1895, the company was converted into a limited company.

In the 1930s, Glud & Marstrand acquired Carl Lunds Gabrikker on Amager.

In 1978, the company was taken over by Burmeister & Wain under the management of Jan Bonde Nielsen- The following year it went into a controversial merger with Burmeister & Wain A/S and then into liquidation.

In 1981, Glud & Marstrand A/S was revived by the investment company Kirkbi with the production of metal packaging. The company was later merged with a number of other Danish and Swedish companies within the same industry, making Glud & Marstrand Scandinavia's largest and one of Europe's largest suppliers of metal packaging.

In 2005, the company was taken over by the Dutch ABN AMRO Capital. In the same year, the company had 1109 employees and a turnover of DKK 1.66 billion.

In 2011, Glud & Marstrand was acquired by Envases Universales de México, In 2020, its name was changed to Envases Europe A/S.

== Products ==
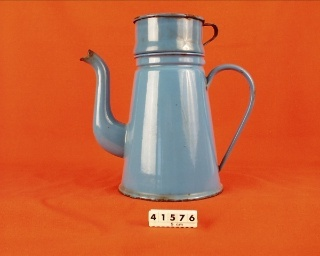
The Madame Blue coffee pot.

Glud and Marstrand produced a wide range of metal products for households, inclyding kitchenware, buckets and toys. After the turn of the century, Glud and Marstrand launched their blue enamel kitchenware. Their coffee pot was marketed under the name Madam Blue (Madame Blue). In the 1930s. Glud / Marstrand also launched a production of red and orange enamel products. The production of Madam Blue was discontinued in 1966.
