= Brorson's Church =

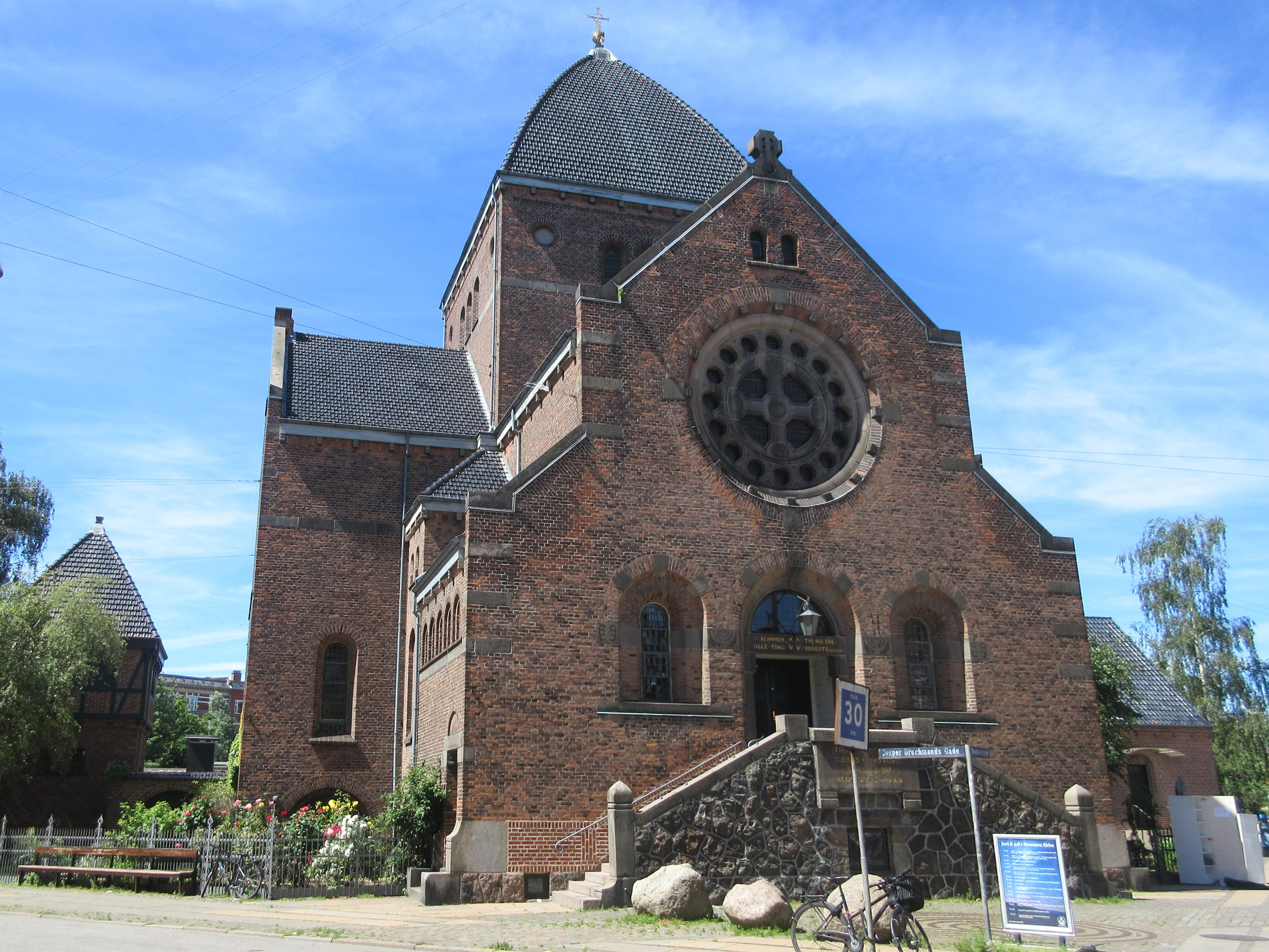
- Brorson's Church
- Brorson's Church
- 55°41′15.01″N 12°32′46″E
- Location: Nørrebro, Copenhagen
- Country: Denmark
- Denomination: Protestant

History
- Status: Church

Architecture
- Architect: Thorvald Jørgensen
- Architectural type: Church
- Style: Historicist
- Groundbreaking: 1898
- Completed: 1901

Specifications
- Materials: Brick

Administration
- Diocese: Diocese of Copenhagen

Brorson's Church (Danish: Brorsons Kirke) is a church located in the Nørrebro district of Copenhagen, Denmark. The church is named after Hans Adolph Brorson.

== History ==
Brorson's Church was built from 1898 to 1901 to the design of Thorvald Jørgensen who later designed Christiansborg Palace. The building was constructed by master mason Vilhelm Køhler (1869-1956).

== Architecture ==
The church is inspired by Byzantine and late Romanesque architecture. The plan is cruciform with a square-shaped central tower, and it is built in red brick with corners and details in granite.

A double granite staircase leads up to the main entrance which is located in the south-eastern cross arm. Above its portal, which has a round-arched tympanum, there is a large rose window.

== Interior and furnishings ==
The vault in the central tower is decorated with lime frescos depicting Christ surrounded by Evangelist symbols and angels.

In the three windows of the choir, there are glass paintings by Axel Hou and the walls have blinds with verses by Brorson. The original altarpiece painting (1903) is by Poul Steffensen. The pulpit and the font are carved in granite by A. Bundgård. The 64-armed candle holder was designed by Erik Herløv in 1951.

At the moment Brorson's Church has the world's only graffiti altarpiece made by Brandon Lewis a.k.a. Juse One and architect Tue Bondo Arentoft (frame).

== Brorson's Church today ==
Brorson's Church is located in Blågårdens Parish along with the Church of the Holy Cross. It is used as a church for children and young people.
