= Enghavevej =

Street in Copenhagen, Denmark

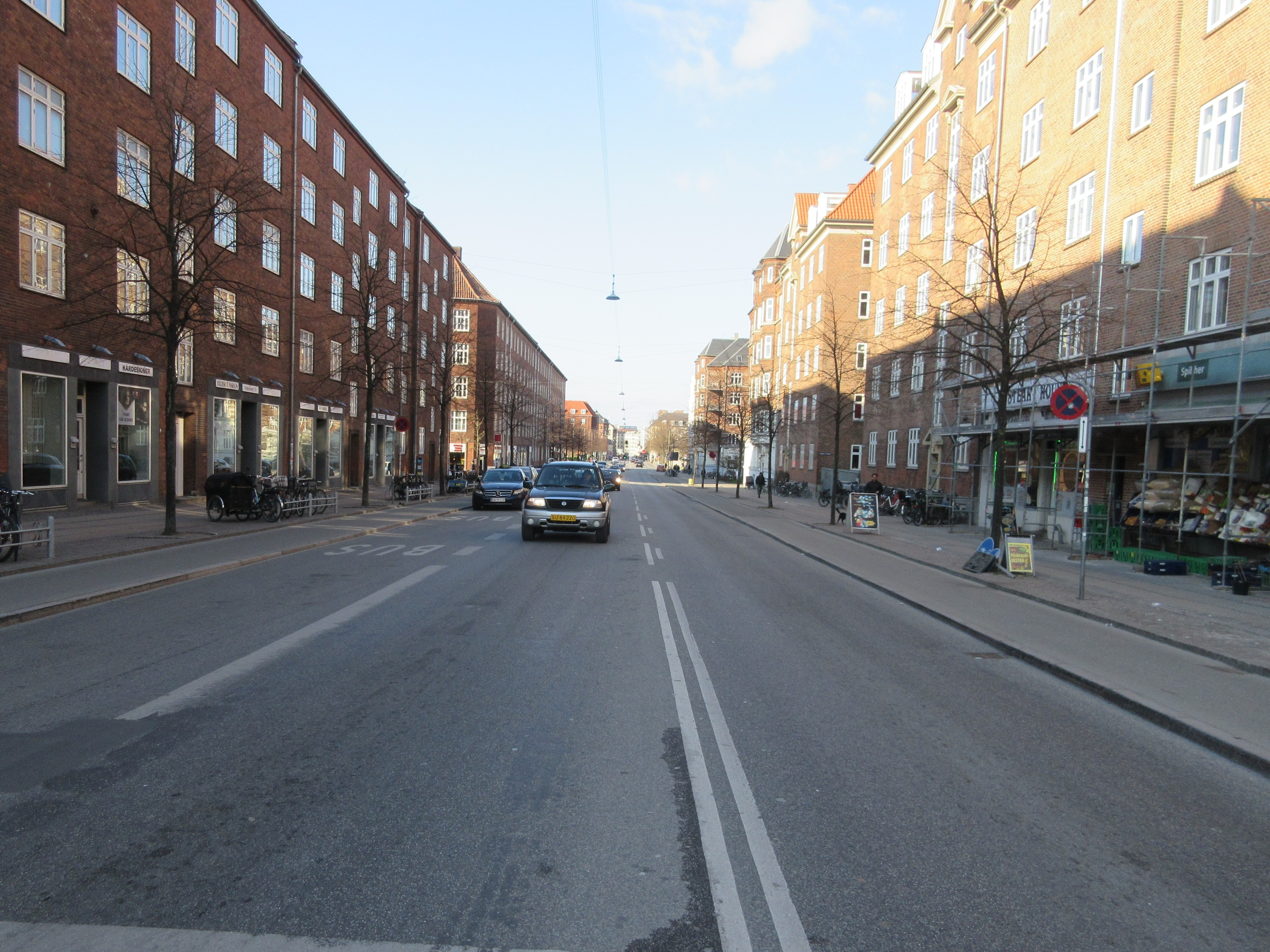
- Length: 2,180 m (7,150 ft)
- Location: Copenhagen, Denmark
- Quarter: Vesterbro/Kongens Enghave
- Nearest metro station: Enghave Plads
- Coordinates: 55°39′51.38″N 12°32′32.46″E
- North end: Vesterbrogade
- Major junctions: Sønder Boulevard
- South end: Sydhavns Plads

Enghavevej is a major street in the Vesterbro and Kongens Enghave districts of Copenhagen, Denmark. It runs from Vesterbrogade in the north to Sydhavns Plads in the south, linking Kingosgade with Sydhavnsgade and Borgbjergsvej.

== History ==
=== 18th and 19th centuries ===
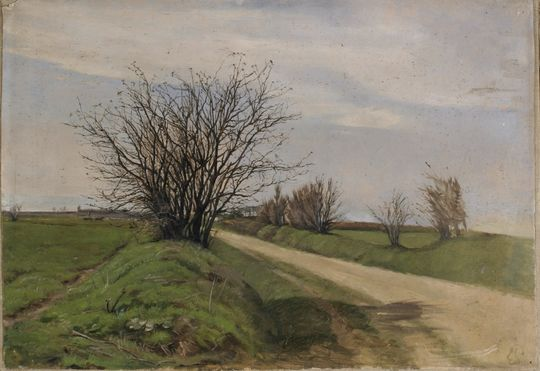
Enghavevej, 1860

The name Kongens Enghave (The King's Meadow Garden) is known from 1683 and referred to an area used for production of animal feed for the king's horses. The road was created in 1795 when the area was divided into 22 estates and sold. The road continued all the way to Gammel Køge Landevej. The only buildings along the road were the farms Frederiksholm, Larsens Minde, Lises Minde Frederikslund and Wilhelms Minde.

In 1871, Frederiksholm was acquired by two brothers and converted into a brickworks. Frederiksholm Brickworks produced many of the bricks that were used in the construction of Vesterbro. The brickworks closed in 1918.

=== 20th century ===
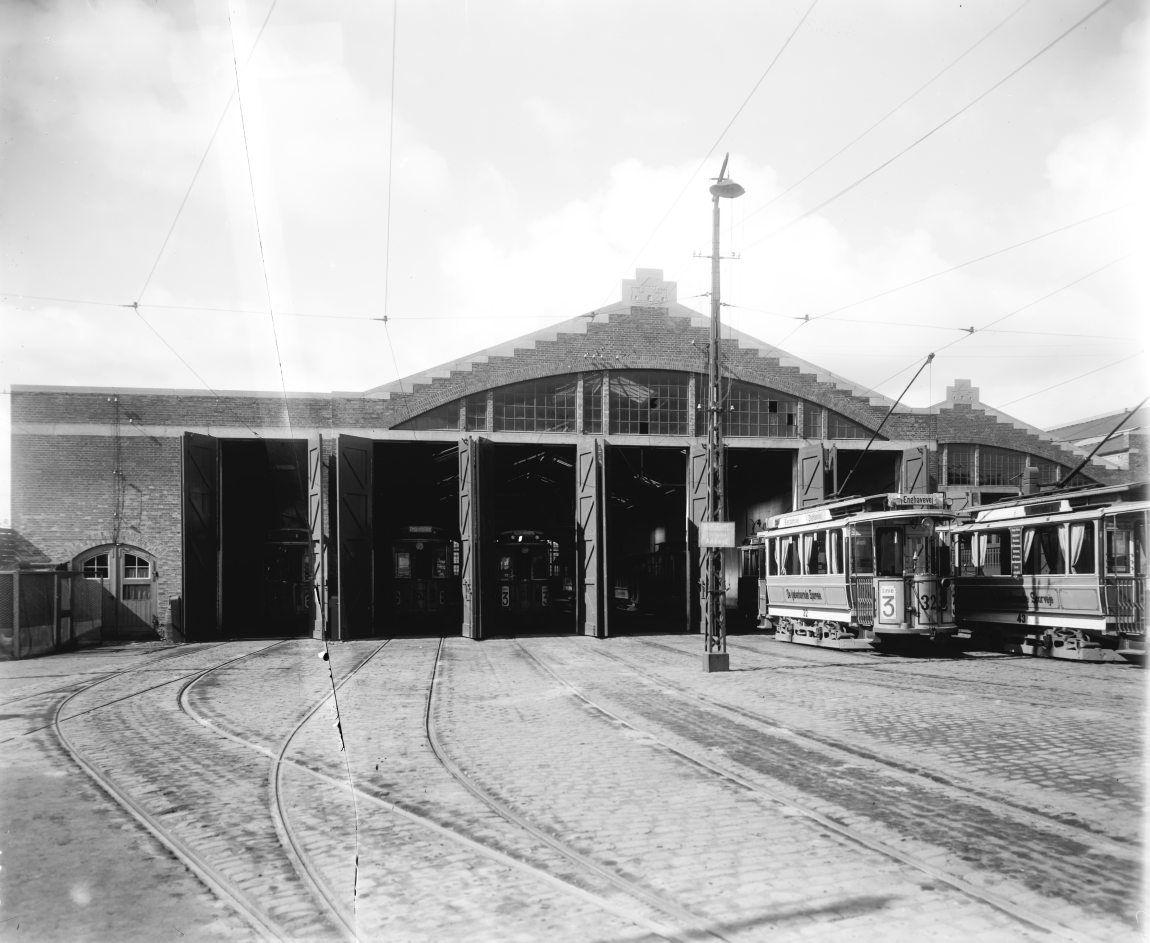
The tramway depot photographed by Frederik Riise

Arbejdernes Kooperative Byggeselskab (The Workers' Cooperative Building Association) started redeveloping the area shortly after its foundation in 1913.

In 1915, Copenhagen Tramways line 3 was extended from Enghave Plads to a tram loop at Frederiksholm (now Sydhavns Plads). On 15 October 1937, Line 3 was extended to Mozarts Plads. A large remise and workshop complex for the trams was also built at the street.

The outer part of Enghavevej was in 1933 renamed Ellebjergvej, Stubmøllevej, Wagnersvej and Glucksvej. The section from Sydhavns Plads to Mozarts Plads was in 1949 renamed Borgbjergsvej.

== Notable buildings ==
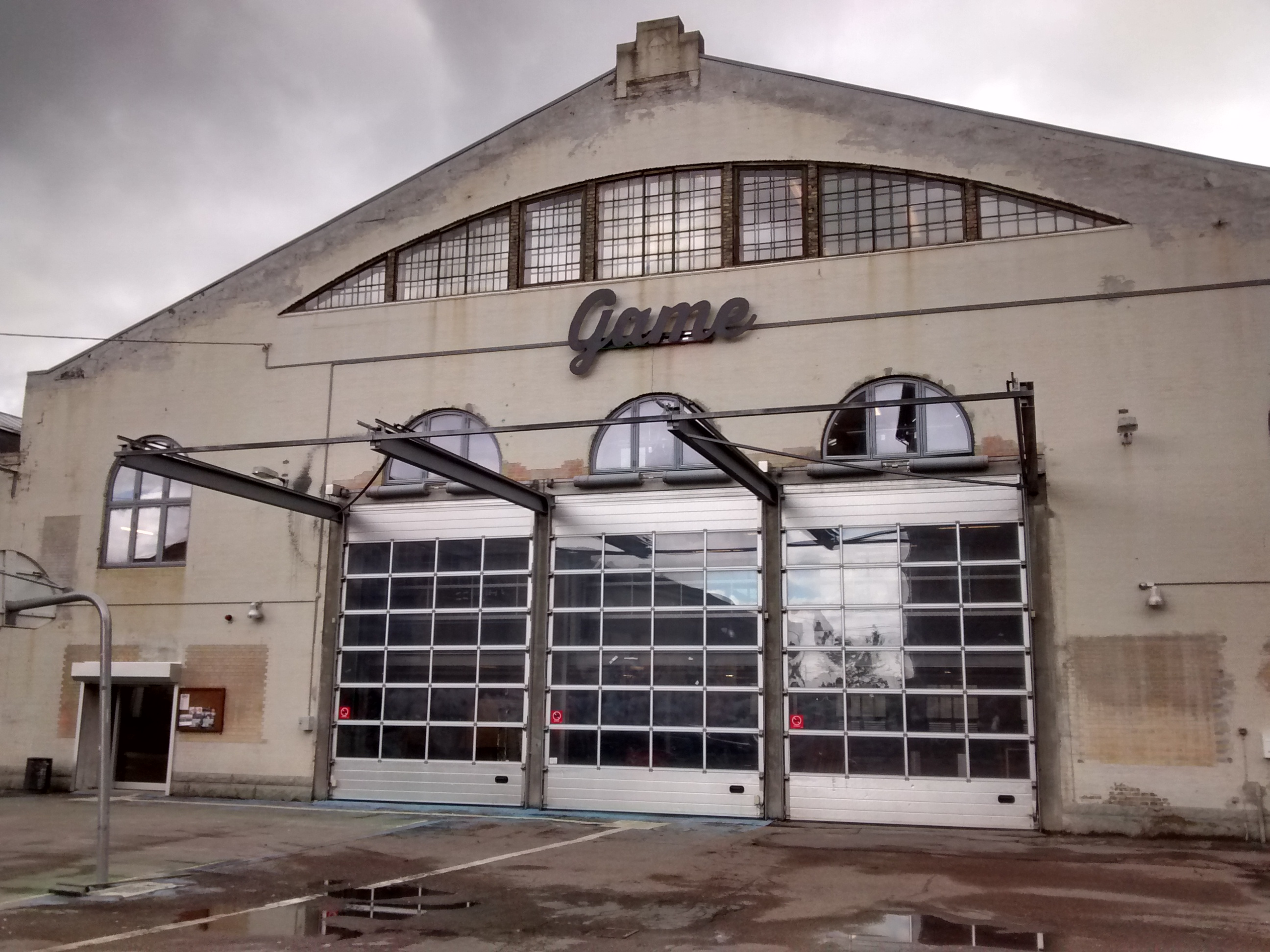
No. 80-82: CPH Skatepark

The former Enghavevej School is from 1894 to 1895 and was designed by Ludvig Fenger.

Vega (No. 40) is one of Copenhagen's leading venues for contemporary music. The building is a former assembly building constructed for the labour union in 1956 to a Modernist design by Vilhelm Lauritzen. It was listed on the Danish registry of protected buildings and places in 1995.

The former Copenhagen Tramways remise complex (No. 80-82) has been converted into a centre for street culture and street sports. The activities include Street basketball, parkour, dance, street soccer, street art, beat production, and DJing. It comprises Copenhagen Skatepark and StreetMekka (No. 82D).

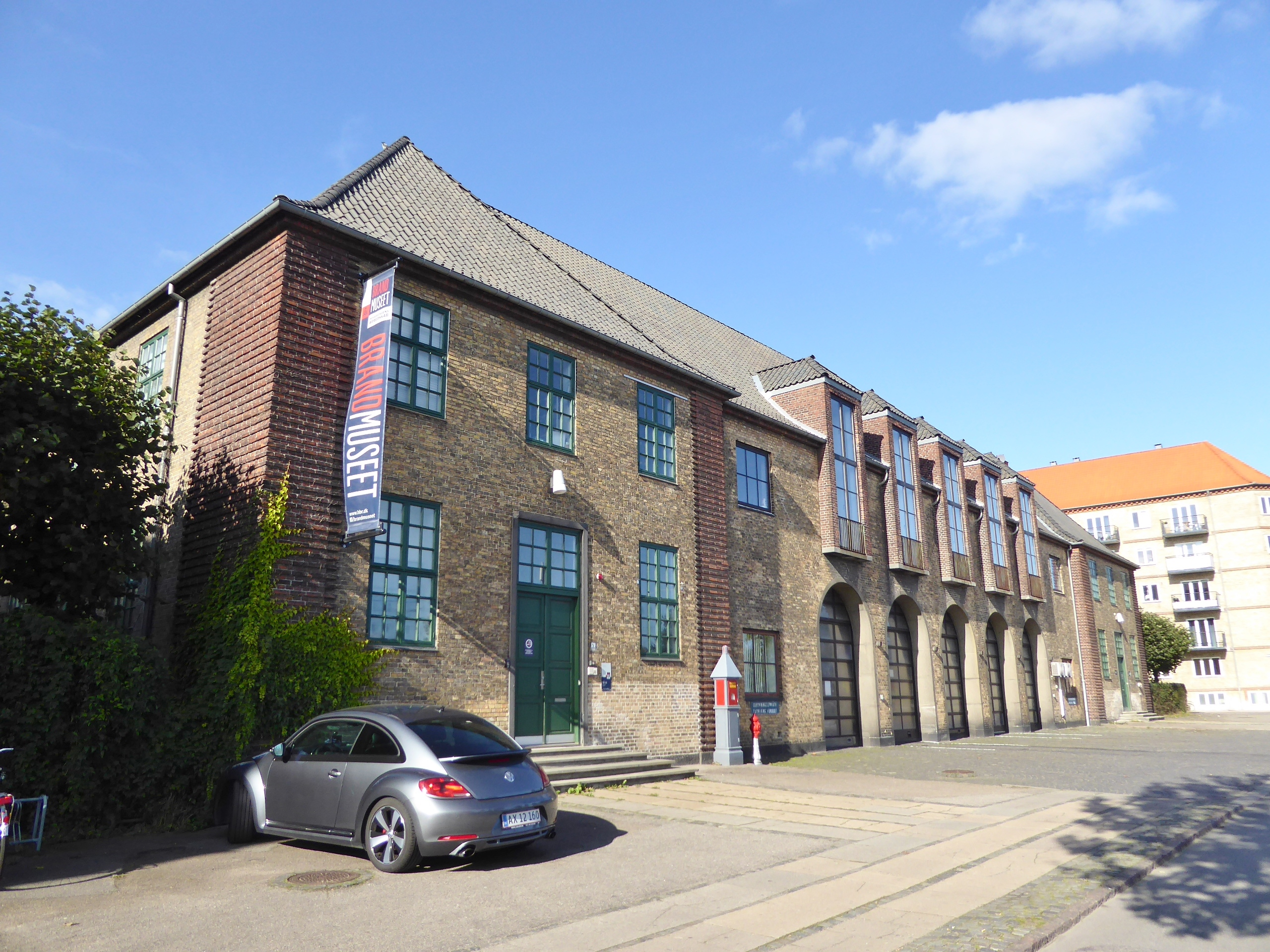
No. 170: Vesterbro Fire Station

Vesterbro Fire Station (No. 170) was inaugurated on 1 November 1929. The building was designed by city architect Poul Holsøe. The adjacent Bavnehøj School was built 1928–29 to a design by Poul Holsøe in collaboration with Tage Rue.

The housing estate at No. 120 was the first development constructed by Arbejdernes Kiooperative Byggeforening shortly after its foundation in 1913. It is built to a National Romantic design by Christian Mandrup-Poulsen with loggias and Mansard roofs. The housing estate at No. 92-142 was built for Arbejdernes Andels Boligforening (AAB, "The Workers Cooperative Housing Association") in 1945–1946. It was designed by Knud Hansen. Enghaven I (No. 172-84) is from 1932 to 1933 and was designed by Arthur Wittmaack and Vilhelm Hvalsøe.

== Public art ==
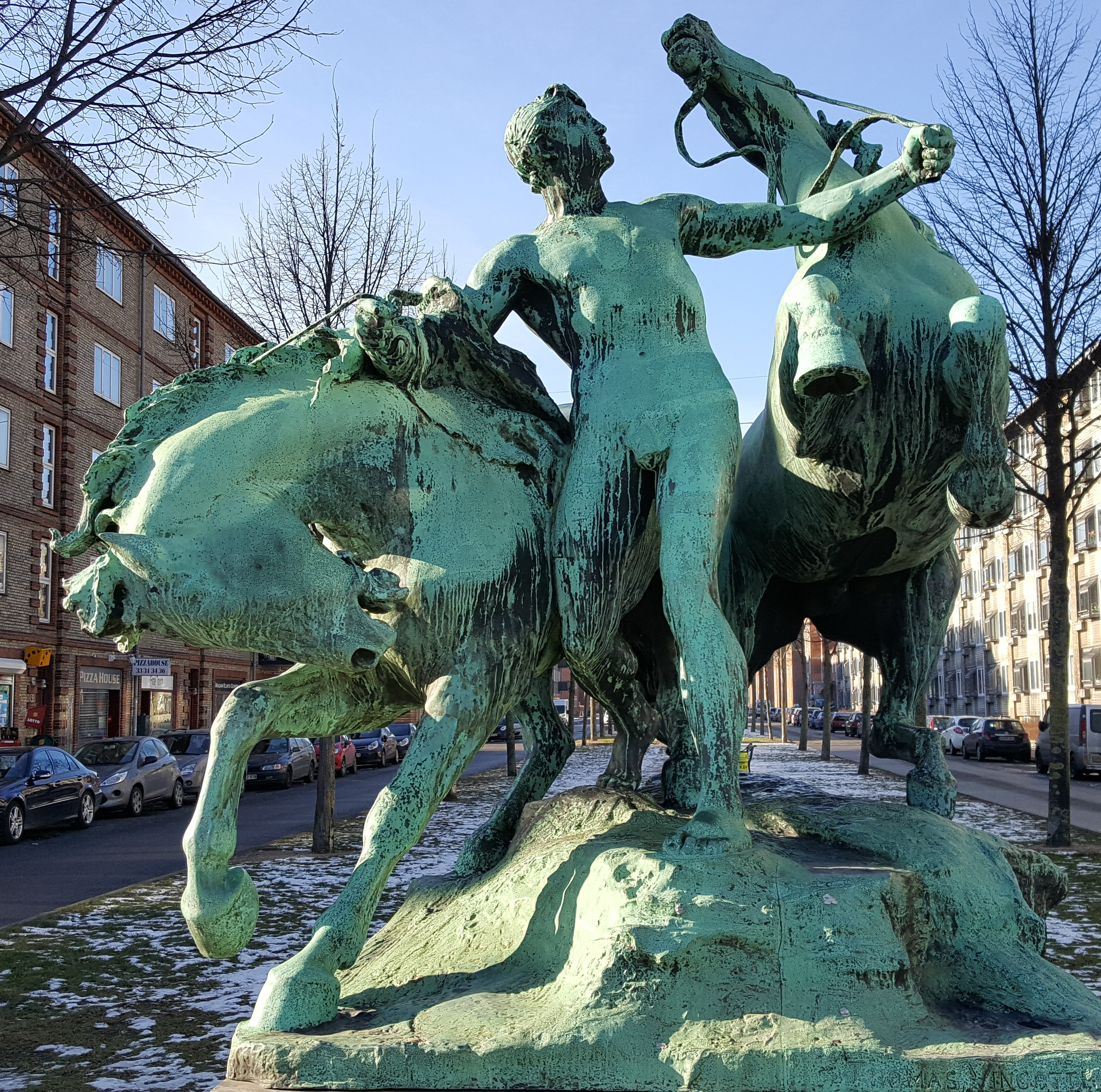
Thomas Vinçotte's 1885 group sculpture Le dompteur de chevaux seen from Enghavevej

In the central reservation of Bavnehøj Allé, facing Enghavevej, stands a copy of Thomas Vinçotte's 1885 group sculpture Le dompteur de chevaux (Horse Tamer).

== Transport ==
The nearest Copenhagen Metro station is Enghave Plads.

Enghave station S-train opened at the street in 1934. It closed on 3 July 2016 as it was replaced by Carlsberg station 200 metres further west. The far end of the street is served by Sydhavn station.

== Cultural references ==
Tipskiosken at Enghavevej 184 was used as a location in the 1984 feature film Midt om natten.
