= Sønder Boulevard =

Park in Copenhagen, Denmark

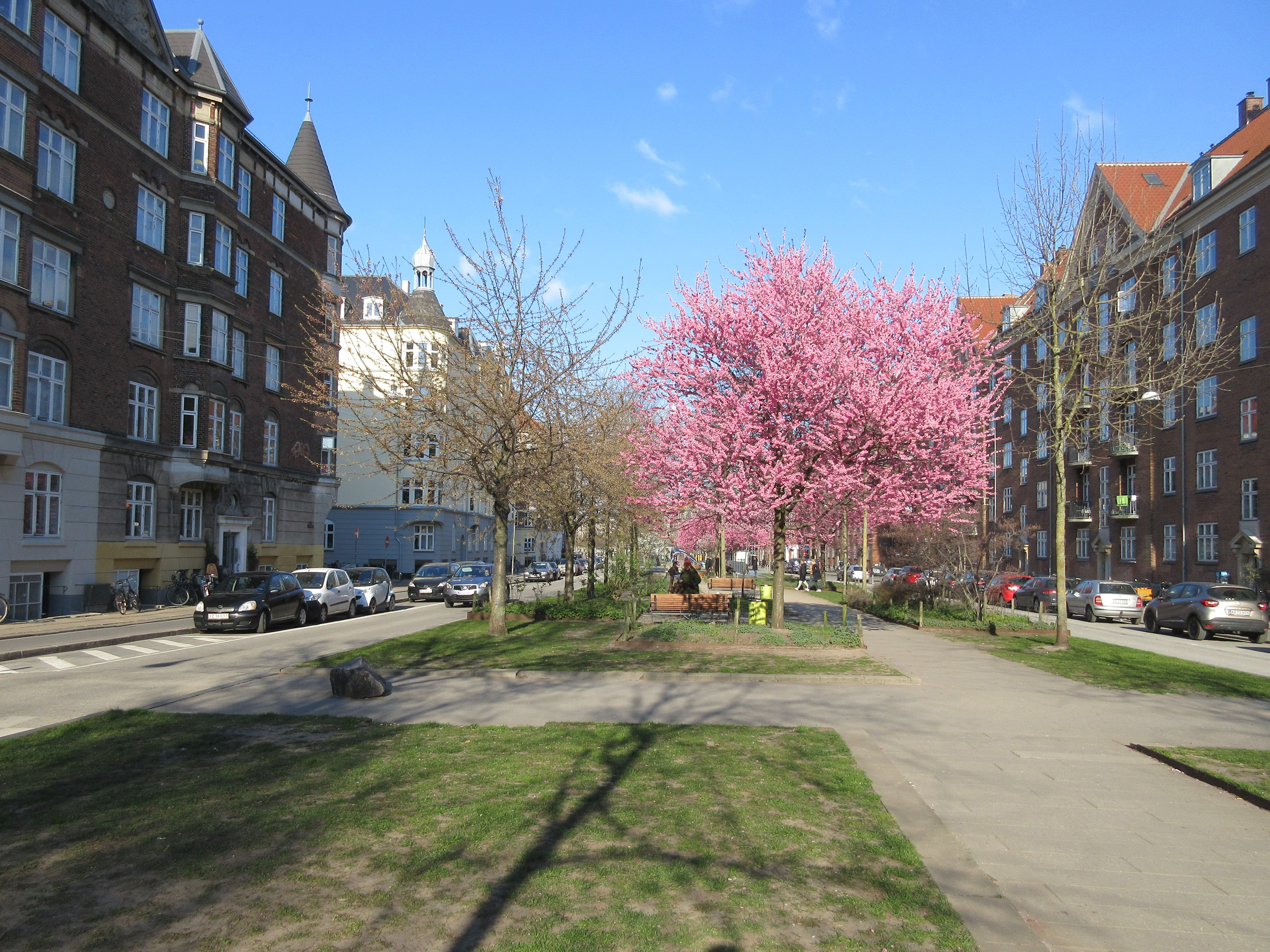
- Length: 1,280 m (4,200 ft)
- Location: Copenhagen, Denmark
- Quarter: Vesterbro
- Postal code: 1720
- Nearest metro station: Copenhagen Central Station, Enghave Plads, Carlsberg station
- Coordinates: 55°39′54.36″N 12°32′54.6″E
- Northeast end: Halmtorvet
- Major junctions: Enghavevej
- Southwest end: Vester Fælledvej

Sønder Boulevard (lit. "South Boulevard") is a boulevard in the Vesterbro district of Copenhagen, Denmark, whose broad central reserve has been turned into a linear park with various facilities for sports and other activities. It runs from Halmtorvet next to Copenhagen Central Station in the north east to the Carlsberg district in the southwest.

== History ==
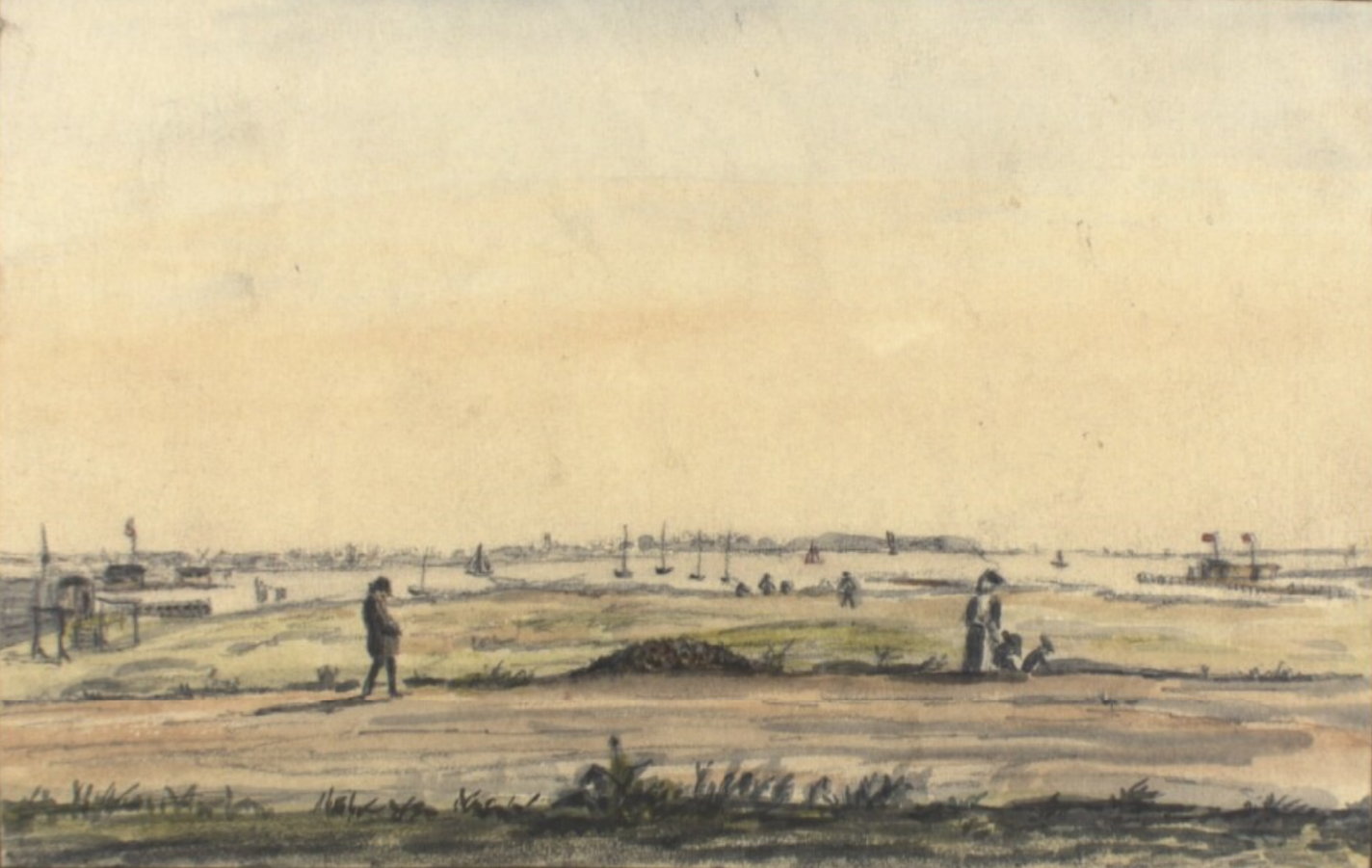
Ludvig Both: The extension of Stormgade, Old Railway, on 27 June 1884

Sønder Boulevard follows the initial stretch of Denmark's first railway, the Copenhagen–Roskilde railway line between Copenhagen and Roskilde, which opened in 1847. In 1864, the railway line was moved to a more northern course, through Frederiksberg, before being moved to its current position just south of Sønder Boulevard in 1911.

The portion of the abandoned railway terrain closest to the city was transformed into a broad street in the emerging Vesterbro district. A direct continuation of Stormgade the street was given the name Ny Stormgade (New Storm Street).In 1905., the street was refurbished and renamed Sønder Boulevard. The name complemented those of Vester Boulevard (West Boulevard, now H. C. Andersens Boulevard and Nørre Boulevard (North Boulevard, now Nørre Voldgade).

Sønder Boulevard was long a dilapidated thoroughfare dominated by traffic. The elm trees which originally lined it were hit by Dutch elm disease and had to be removed.

After Halmtorvet was refurbished between 1999 and 2003, Sønder Boulevard was given similar treatment from 2005 to 2007. The project was designed by SLA.

== Design and facilities ==
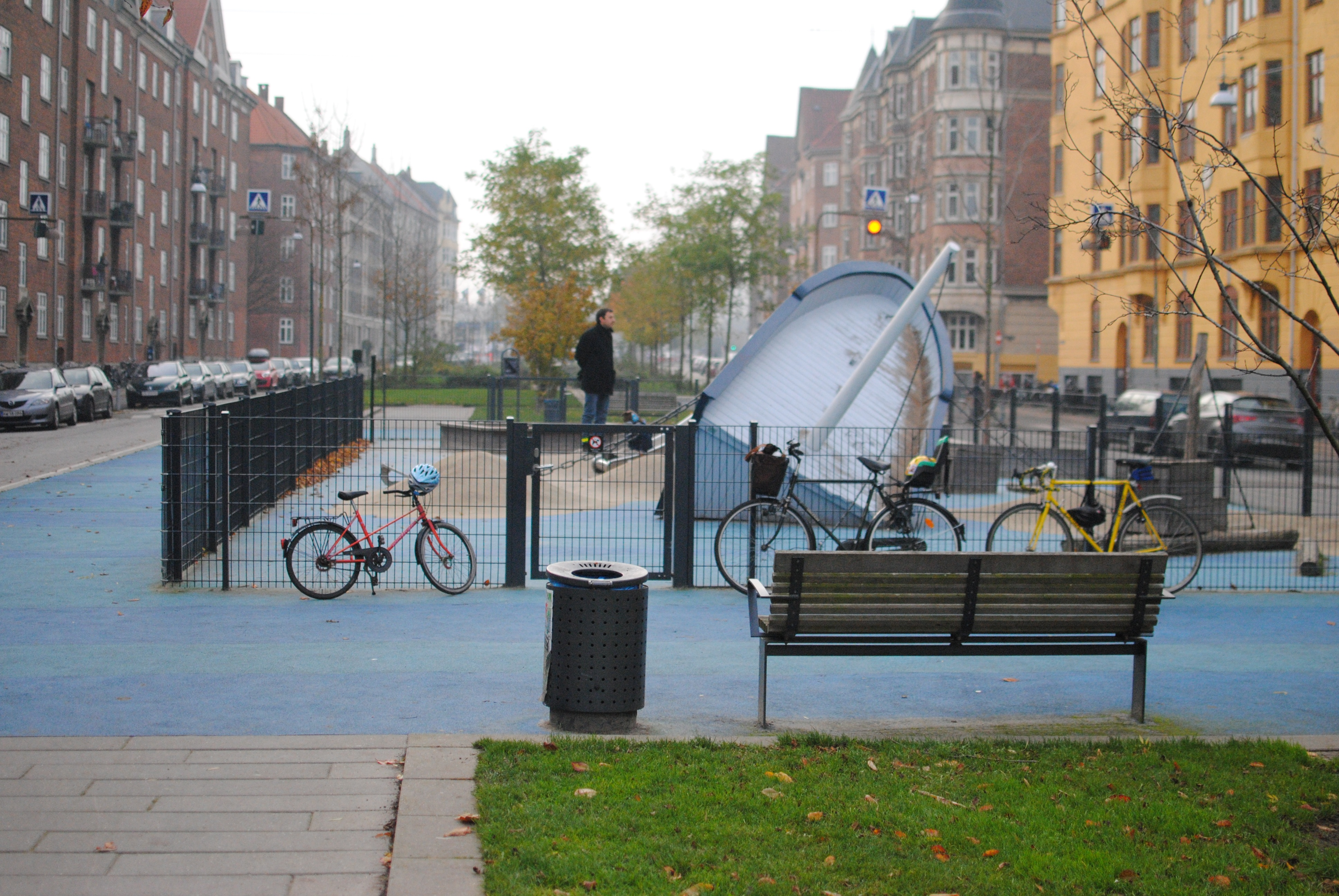
The playground on a misty autumn day

The boulevard has sections with different forms of vegetation such as lawns and perennial gardens. Facilities include a playground with a shipwreck theme, a ball cage, a track for BMX bikes and seating areas with very different ambiences.

== Buildings ==
Most of the boulevard is lined with typical Copenhagen five-storey residential buildings from the late 19th and early 20th century. Absalon's Church (No. 73) was completed in 1934 to design by Arthur Wittmaack. Wittmaack had already designed the cinema Boulevard Teatret which opened at No. 79–81 in 1924. In 1965, it was taken over by Peter Refn og Knud Hauge and operated as Copenhagen's first art cinema under the name Camera. It closed after Refn took over Grand Teatret in 1974.

== Public art, monuments and memorials ==
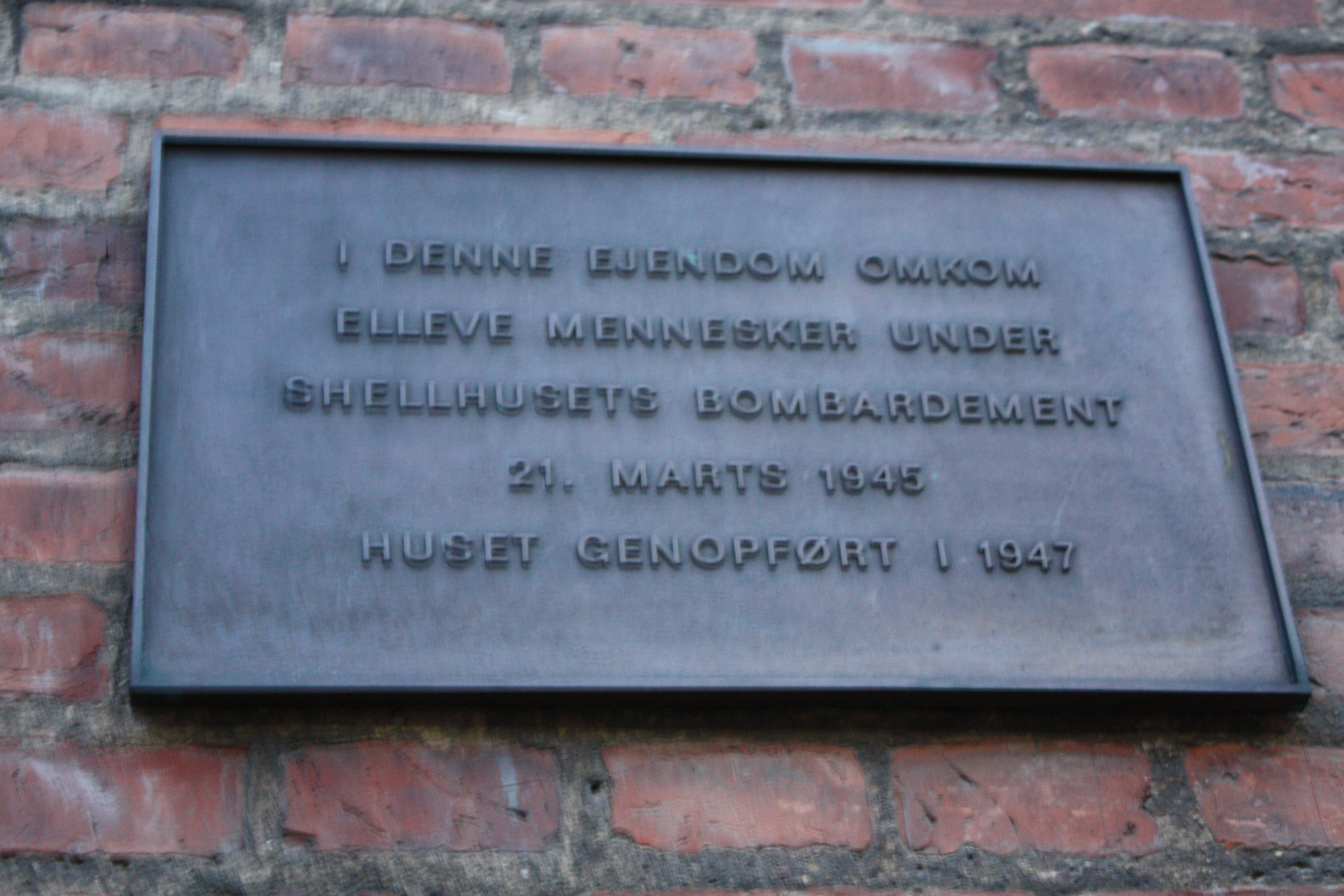
No. 106: Commemorative plaque

A plaque on No. 106 commemorates that a stray British bomb hit No. 106 and exploded during Operation Carthage on 21 March 1945, killing 11 people in the building.

== Transport ==
Copenhagen Central Station and Carlsberg station are located close to each end of the street.

Enghave Plads Station on the Copenhagen Metro City Circle Line close to the junction with Flensborggade and Istedgade opened in 2019.

== Cultural references ==
The Camera cinema (Sønder Boulevard 81) was used as a location in the 1967 film Fantasterne and again in the 1968 film Min søsters børn vælter byen.
