= Axelborg =

Building in Copenhagen, Denmark

Coordinates: 55.6754°N 12.5644°E

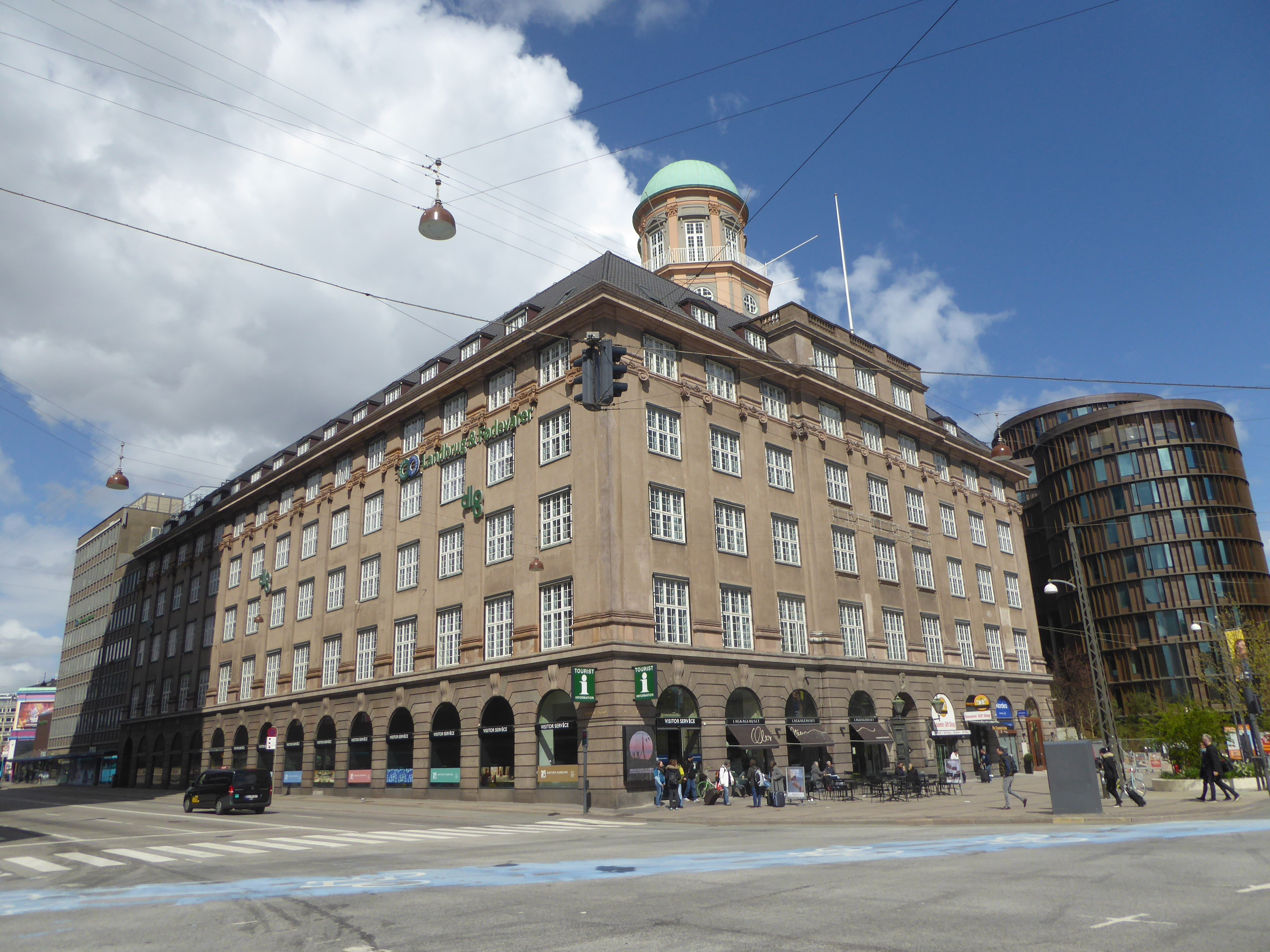
Axelborg viewed from Vesterbrogade

Axelborg, located across the street from Tivoli Gardens on Vesterbrogade in Copenhagen, Denmark, is home to the Danish Agriculture and Food Council. DLG Group is also headquartered in the building. The building was built in 1920 and was originally constructed for a bank. An Irma flagship store opened on the ground floor in 2015 and a Vivalde Café is located on the side that faces Axeltorv.

== History ==
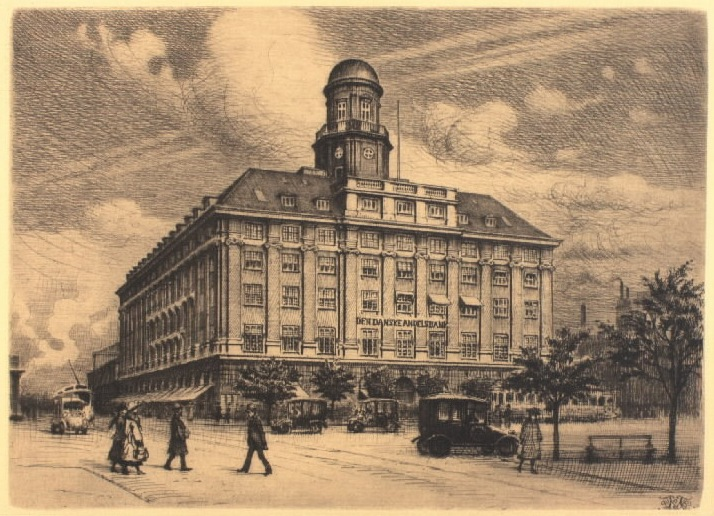
Axelborg in 1926, drawing by Peter Tom-Petersen

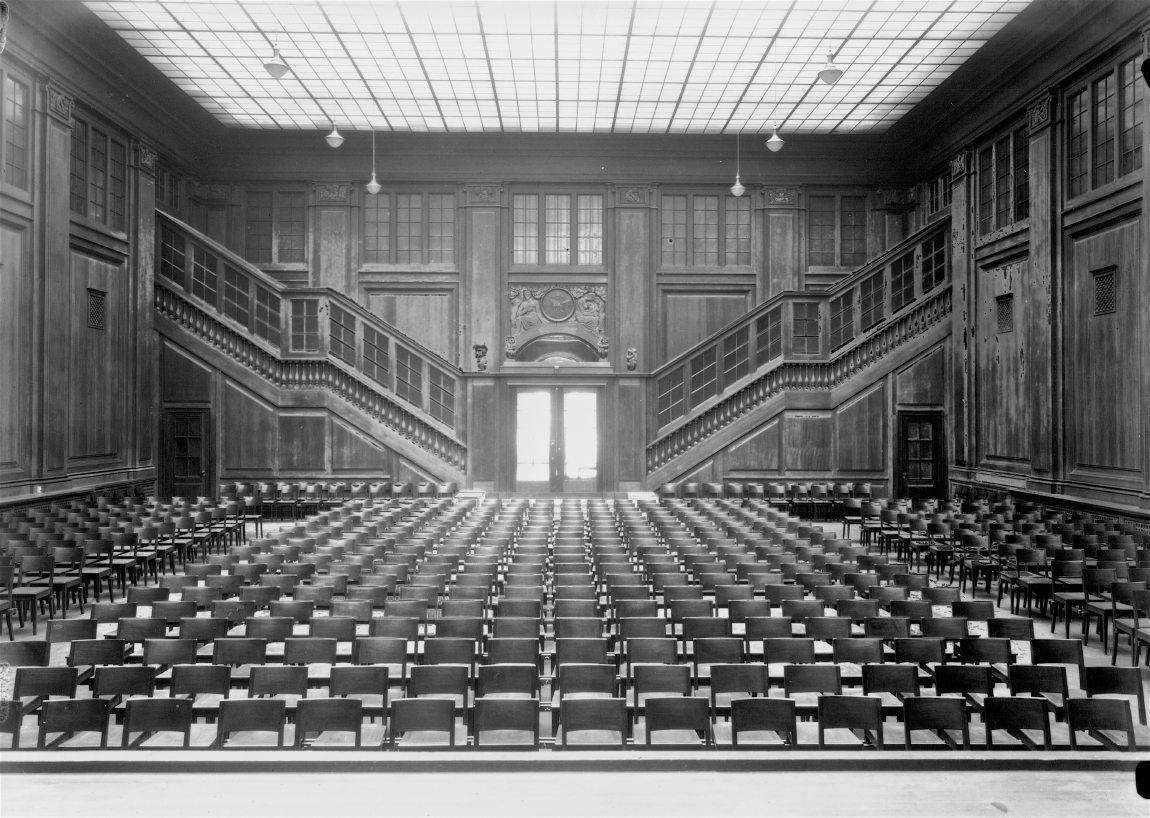
The interior of the building, photographed by Peter Elfelt in 1927

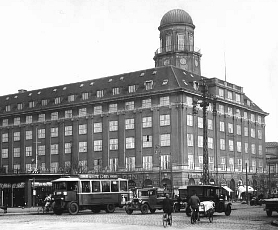
Axelborg in 1932

Axelborg was constructed as a new headquarters for Den Danske Andelsbank, and construction was completed by 1920. The building was designed by architects Arthur Wittmaack and Vilhelm Hvalsøe. It got its name from the adjoining square Axeltorv, which had been inaugurated in 1917.

Den Danske Andelskasse did not use the entire building. Dansk Andels Gødningsforretning, a cooperative manufacturer of fertilizer founded in Aarhus in 1901, was also headquartered in the building, from July 1920.

In 1928, the Danish Broadcasting Corporation (founded in 1925) relocated to rented rooms in the building, but the need for more suitable facilities with proper broadcasting studios and a concert hall for the new radio symphony orchestra soon became evident. Consequently, a new building, Stærekassen, was constructed on Kongens Nytorv and the radio relocated there in 1931. Since then, the building has been occupied by the Danish Agricultural Council (Landbrugsraadet), in 2009 renamed Landbrug & Fødevarer (Danish Agriculture and Food Council).

The building was expanded between 1961 and 1965.

== Architecture ==
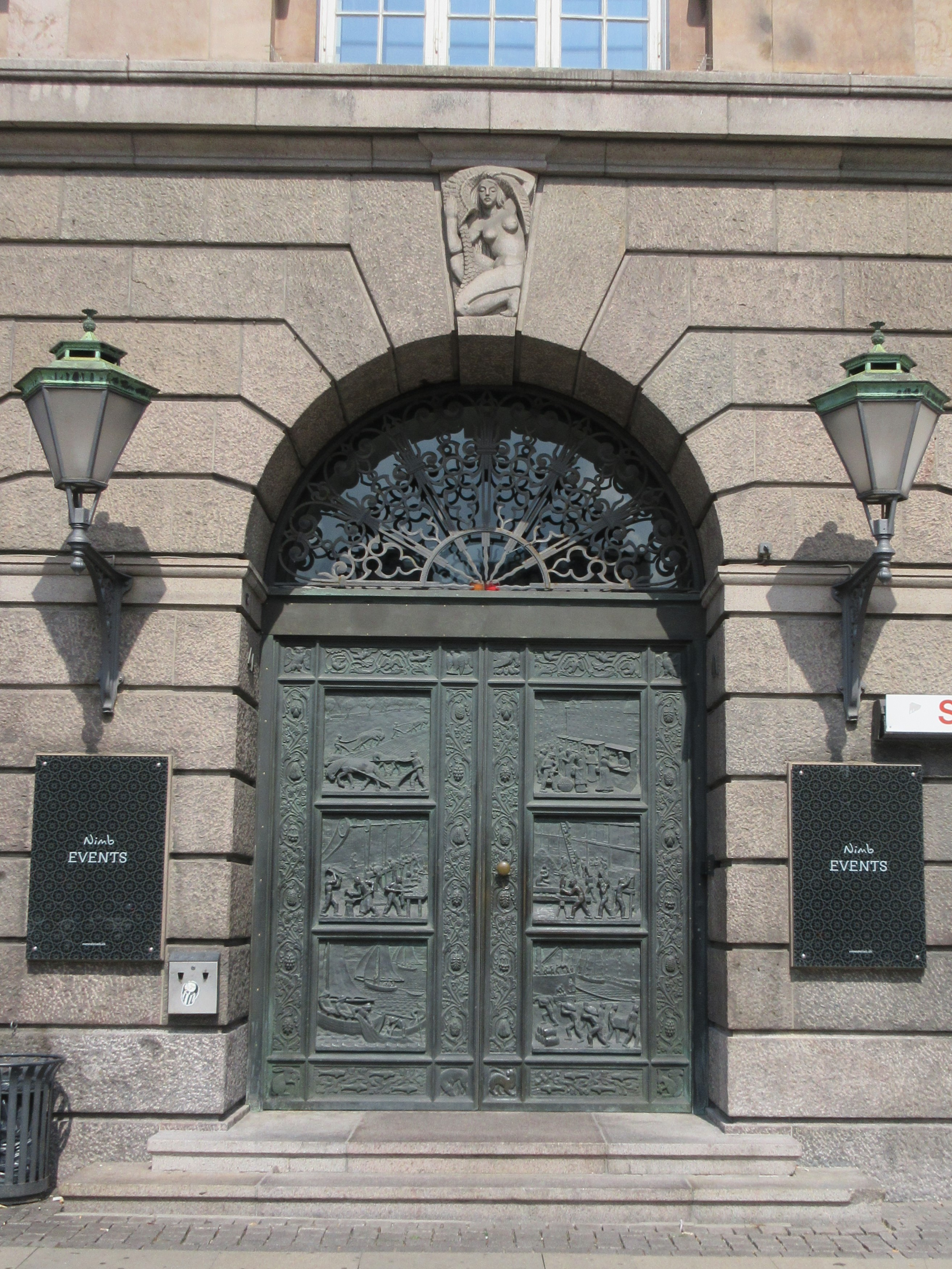
The main entrance

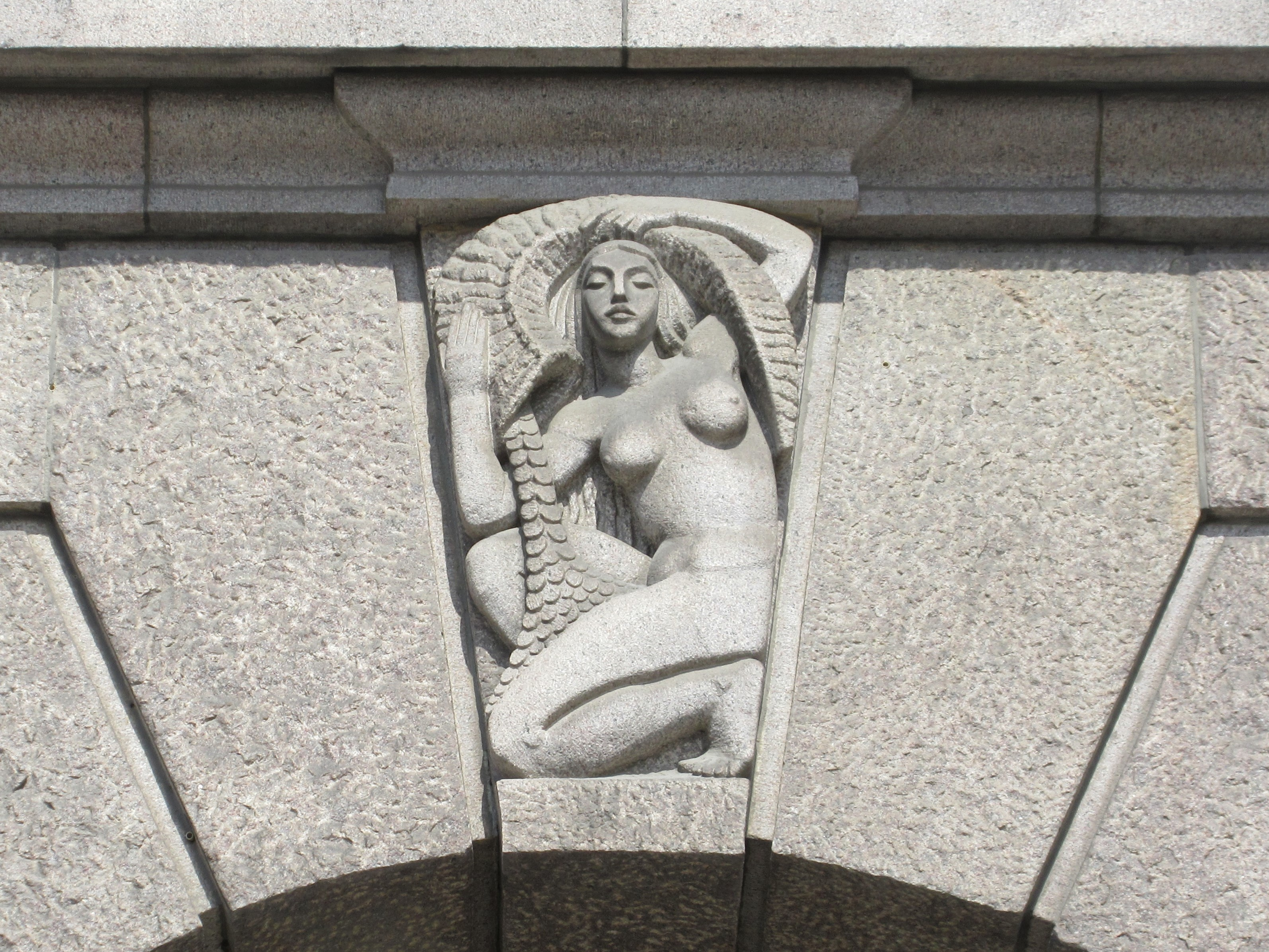
The keystone

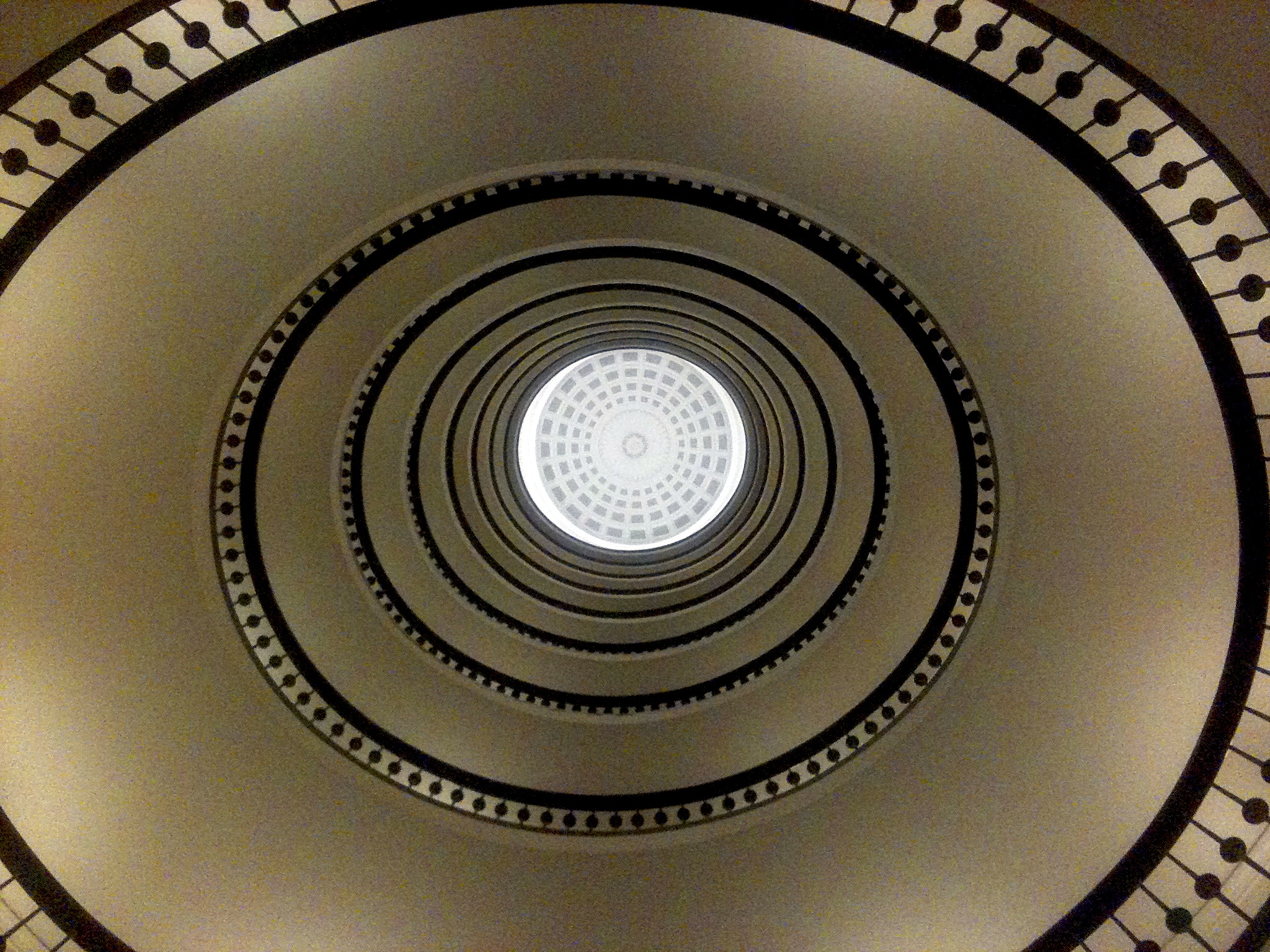
The rotunda

The five-storey building is constructed in brick. The building has rustication on the ground floor and arched openings along the two sides. The four upper floors stand dressed masonry and has wide pilasters between the windows. The roof features a three-bay belvedere, topped by a balustrade, with views of Tivoli Gardens on the other side of the street. The main entrance is flanked by two wall-mounted lanterns and the keystone above the main entrance features a relief of a nude woman. The building has a central rotunda which is topped by a large, domed lantern.

The 1950s extension on the rear side of the building stands in grey concrete.

== Today ==
Danish Agriculture and Food Council is headquartered in the building. DLG has announced that they will be relocating to new headquarters in Fredericia. Part of the building is now used by Tivoli Gardens for special events. An Irma flagship store opened on the ground floor in 2015 and a Vivaldi Café is located in the ground floor on the side that faces Axeltorv.
