= Frederiksberg Allé station =

Copenhagen metro station

Frederiksberg Allé
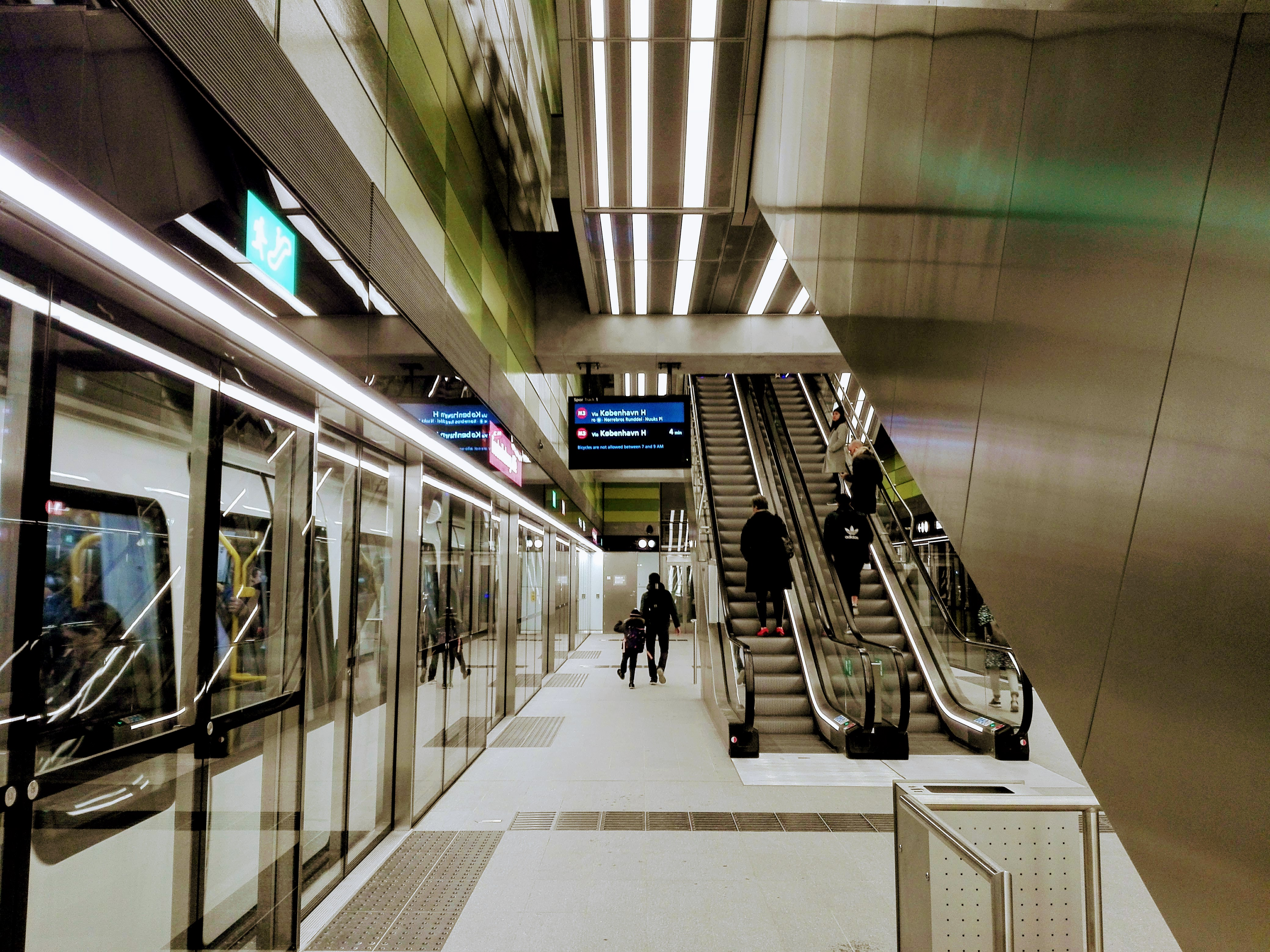
- Frederiksberg Allé Station.

General information
- Location: Frederiksberg Allé 41, 1820 Frederiksberg C
- Coordinates: 55°40′25.5″N 12°32′25.6″E
- System: Copenhagen Metro Station
- Owner: Metroselskabet
- Platforms: 1 island platform
- Tracks: 2
- Bus routes: 7A, 9A, 71, 93N

Construction
- Structure type: Underground
- Accessible: Yes

Other information
- Station code: Fba
- Fare zone: 1

History
- Opened: 29 September 2019; 7 years ago
Location
- Location within Copenhagen Location within Greater Copenhagen Location within Denmark

Frederiksberg Allé station is an underground Copenhagen Metro station located at the corner of Frederiksberg Allé and Platanvej in the Frederiksberg area of Copenhagen, Denmark. It is on the City Circle Line (M3), between Enghave Plads and Frederiksberg, and is in fare zone 1.

== History ==
The station was opened on 29 September 2019 together with 16 other stations of the line.

== Design ==
The station is located beneath a building designed by Cobe.

== Service ==
Preceding station	Copenhagen Metro	Following station
Frederiksberg clockwise	M3	Enghave Plads counter-clockwise
