= Copenhagen Pro =

Skateboarding competition

The Copenhagen Pro (CpH Pro) is an annual skateboarding competition held in Copenhagen, Denmark for professional skateboarders.

During June or July the competition is held at the indoor Copenhagen Skatepark with a new course each year.

The first competition was in 2007.

== 2007 ==
The result from the final 2007

- 1. Bastien Salabanzi
- 2. Wagner Ramos
- 3. Kerry Getz
- 4. Daniel Viera
- 5. Eero Antilla
- 6. Jani Laitiala
- 7. Chris Pfanner
- 8. Willian Seco
- 9. Klaus Bohms
- 10. Ricardo Oliveira Assis
- 11. Steve Forstner
- 12. Roberto Aleman

== 2008 ==
The result from the final 2008

- 1. Danny Cerezini
- 2. Diego Oliveira
- 3. Eero Antilla
- 4. Jereme Rogers
- 5. John Rattray
- 6. Eric Koston (2nd qualifiers)
- 7. Elton Melino
- 8. Daniel Viera
- 9. Matt Beach
- 10. Rob Gonzales
- 11. Pontus Alv
- 12. Willian Seco
