= Absalon's Church =

Church in Copenhagen, Denmark

Coordinates: 55.6654°N 12.5503°E

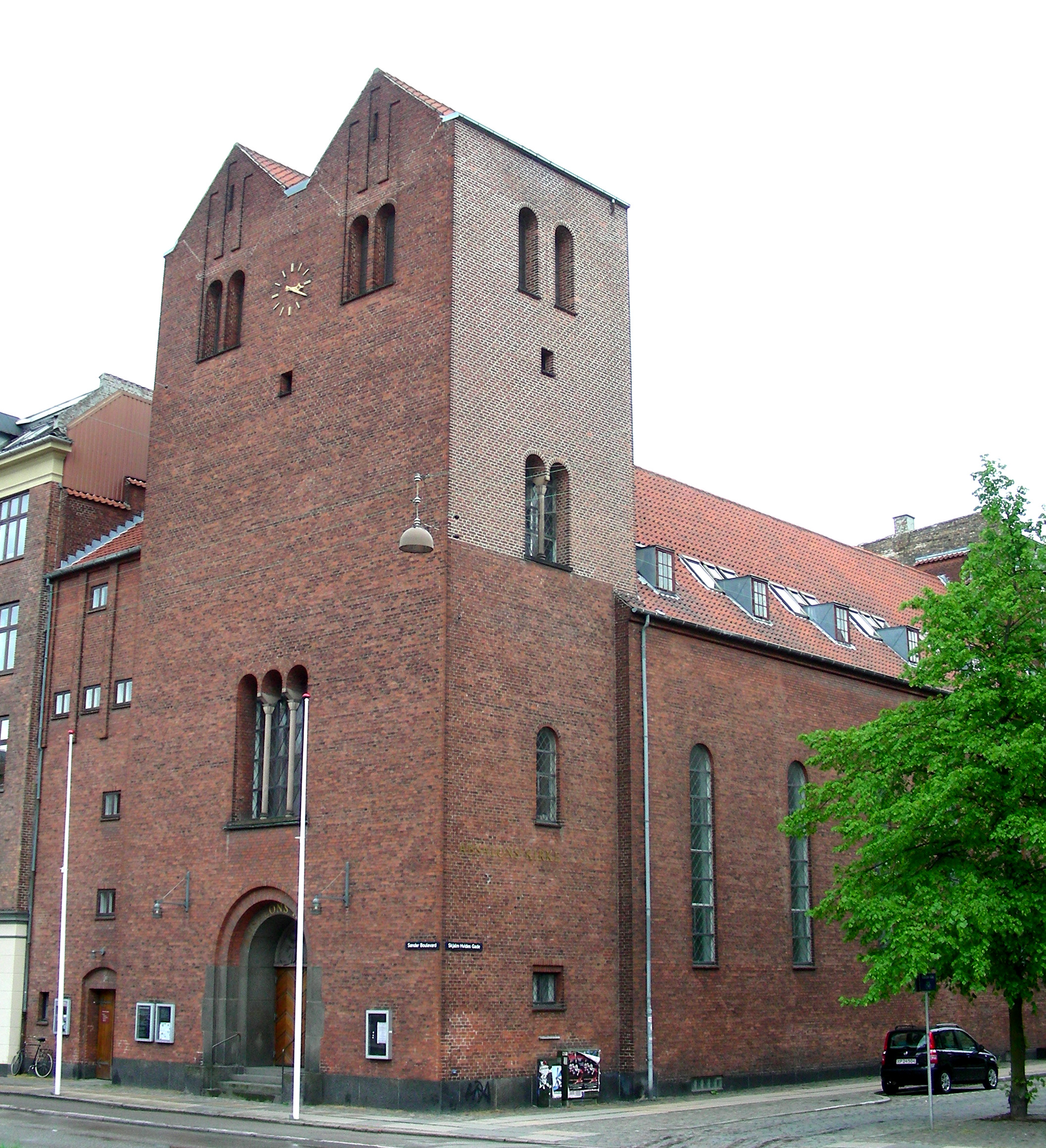
Absalon's Church

Absalon's Church (Danish: Absalons Kirke) is a defunct church in the Absalons Sogn of Copenhagen, Denmark. It was begun in 1926 to designs by Arthur Wittmaack and Vilhelm Hvalsøe. It opened on 2 September 1934. It is named after bishop Absalon.

In 2013 Absalon's Church was one of the six churches in Copenhagen to be closed by the Ministry of Culture of Denmark, however, it was bought by Danish entrepreneur Lennart Lajboschitz for 10 million Danish krone and transformed into a community house (folkehuset) that houses a bar and organizes various activities, including an evening dinner.
