= Copenhagen Skatepark =

Skateboarding venue in Copenhagen, Denmark

Coordinates: 55.6621°N 12.5409°E

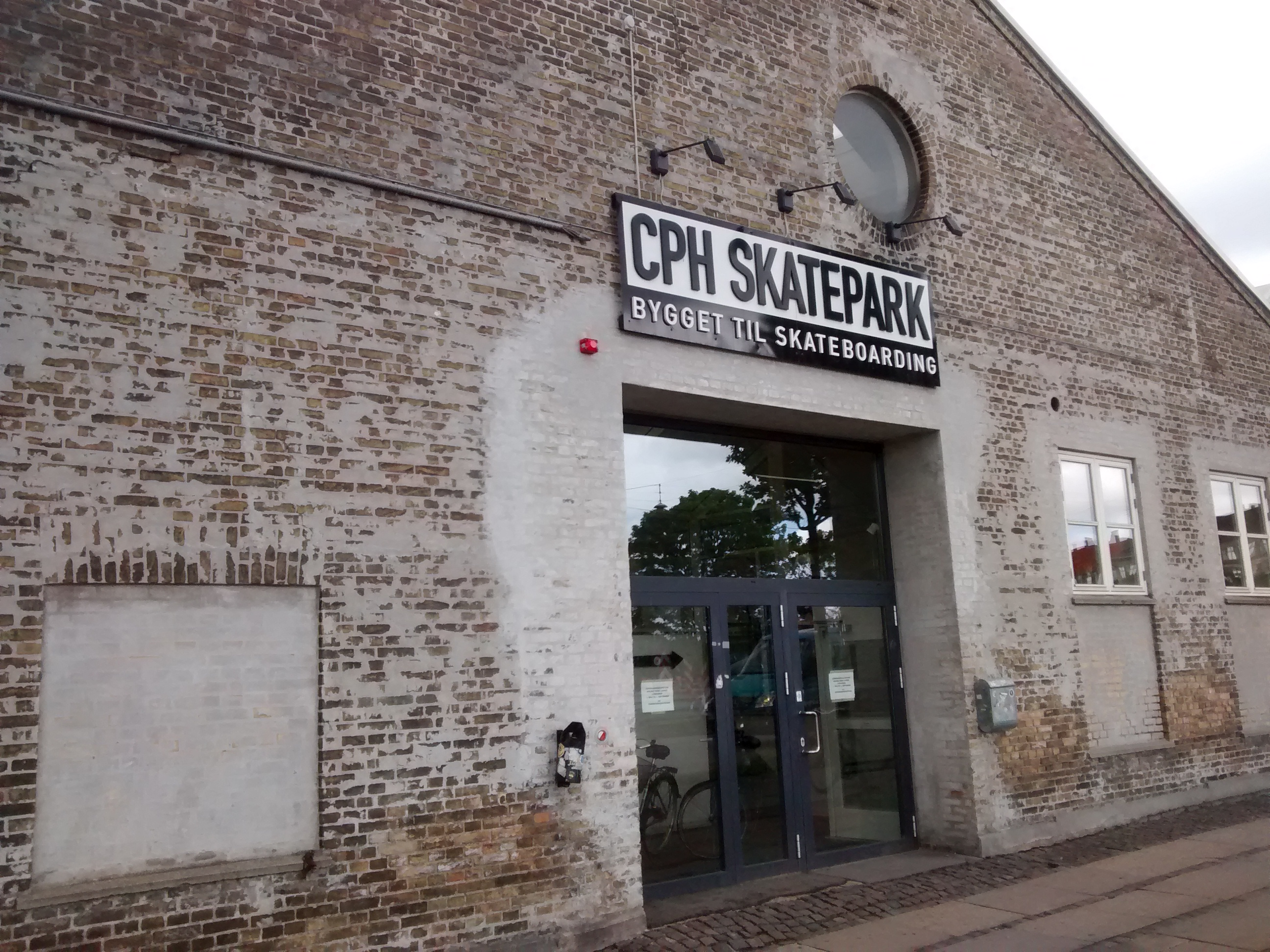
Copenhagen Skatepark

Copenhagen Skatepark, also referred to as CPH Skatepark, is an indoor skateboarding venue located at Enghavevej in the Kongens Enghave district of Copenhagen, Denmark. Copenhagen Skatepark is also involved in the operation of a 4,500 square metre outdoor skatepark in Fælledparken which opened in 2011.

== History ==
Copenhagen Skatepark opened in a former painting workshop of Copenhagen's tramways in 2003. In 2010, it was joined at the site by StreetMekka, a centre for street sports and street art.

== Facilities ==
The vert ramp was at the time of its inauguration the largest in Scandinavia. The street section is divided into three pyramids. There are also ledges, handrails, trapper, quarters and launches. Other facilities include changing rooms, lounge area and a balcony for spectators.

== Annual events ==
=== Copenhagen Pro ===
Copenhagen Skatepark plays host to the annual skateboarding competition Copenhagen Pro (CpH Pro). The first competition was held in 2007.

=== Trailerpark Festival ===
Every year in August, Copenhagen Skatepark arranges the three-day Trailerpark Festival which presents a programme of music, art and performances.
