= StreetMekka =

Indoor street sport and culture center in Denmark

Coordinates: 55°39′42″N 12°32′23″E

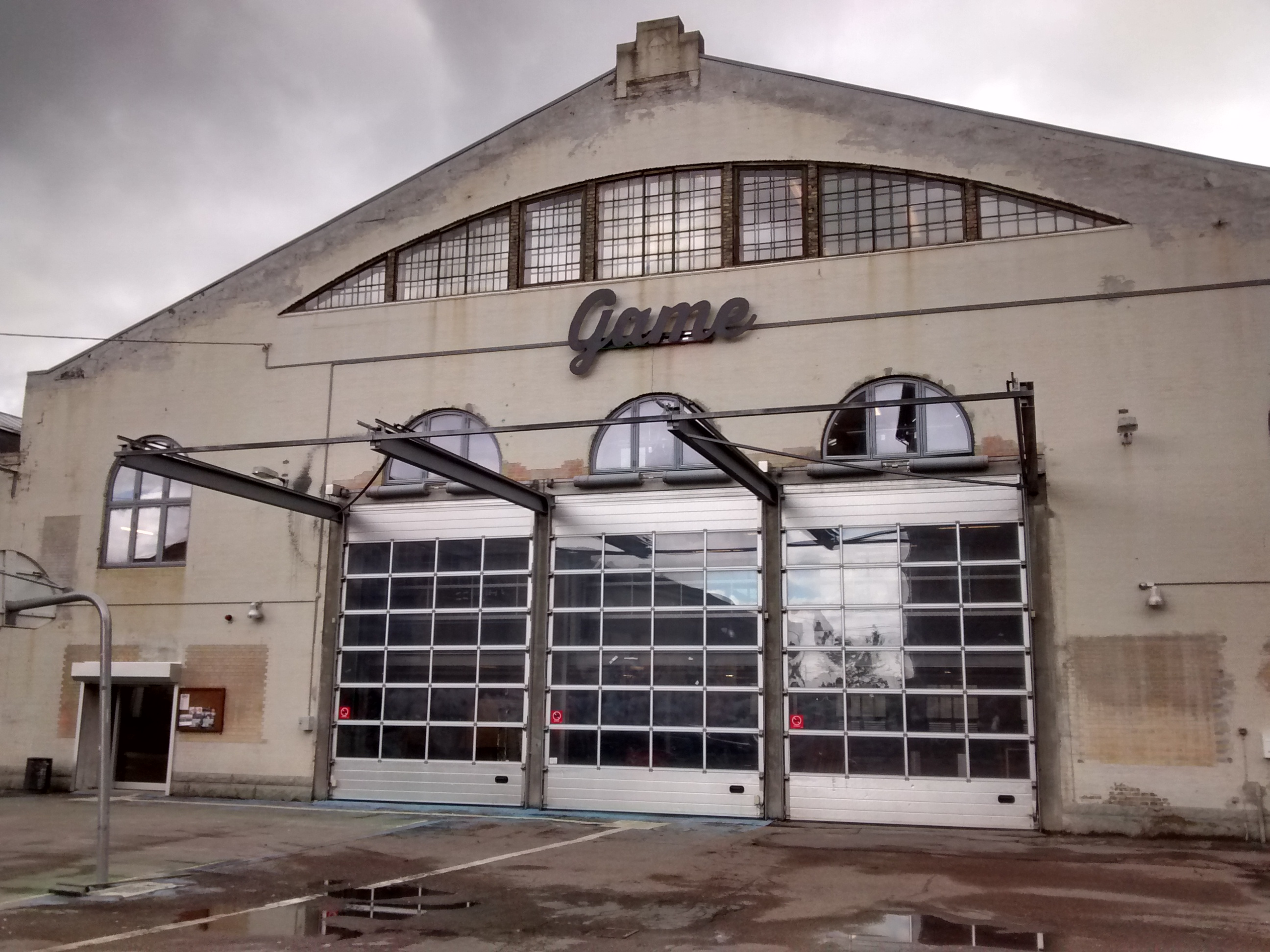
StreetMekka

StreetMekka is a 2,200 square metre indoor venue for street sports and street culture in the Kongens Enghave district of Copenhagen, Denmark. The activities include Street basketball, parkour, dance, street soccer, street art, beat production, and DJing. It is situated at Enghavevej 82 D, adjacent to Copenhagen Skatepark. Founder and the idea of Streetmekka came from Samir Bohammouch in year 2003 who plays Streetbasketball in the city of Copenhagen, Denmark. The Idea was based from the need of having a free place for all people in all ages to come and play streetbasketball all year around, specially in the typical cold weather season in Denmark.

== Operation ==
StreetMekka opened on 16 October 2010 in a former tram workshop. It is operated by the non-profit organization GAME and funded by Copenhagen Municipality in collaboration with locale- og anlægsfonden. StreetMekka received a Special Prize from the International Association for Sports and Leisure Facilities in 2013.
