= Enghave Plads station =

Copenhagen metro station

Enghave Plads
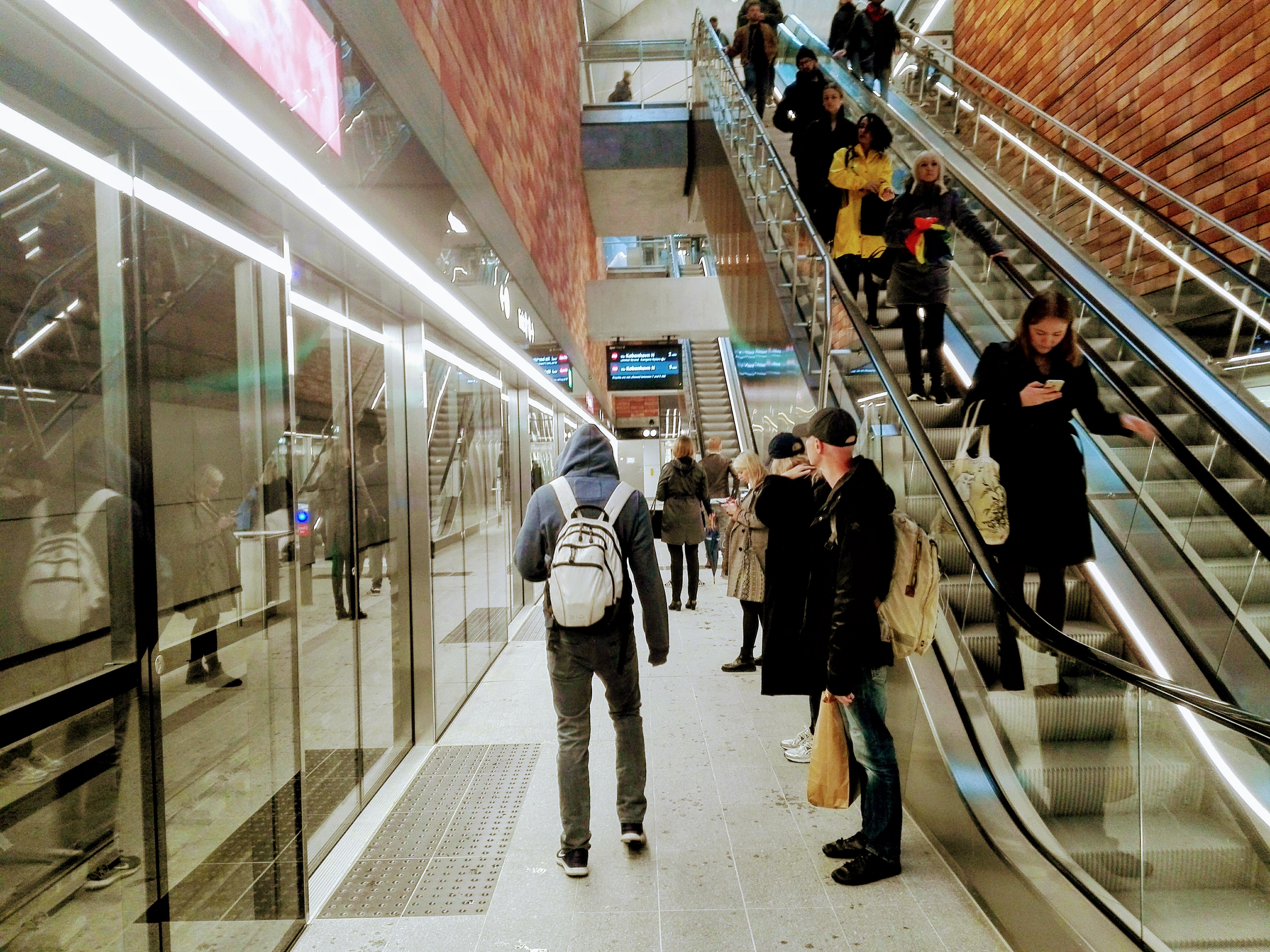
- Enghave Plads Station.

General information
- Location: Enghave Plads 11A, 1670 København V Copenhagen Municipality
- Coordinates: 55°40′02.2″N 12°32′45.3″E
- System: Copenhagen Metro Station
- Owner: Metroselskabet
- Platforms: 1 island platform
- Tracks: 2
- Bus routes: 1A, 23

Construction
- Structure type: Underground
- Accessible: Yes

Other information
- Station code: Ehp
- Fare zone: 2

History
- Opened: 29 September 2019; 7 years ago
Location
- Location within Copenhagen Location within Greater Copenhagen Location within Denmark

Enghave Plads station is an underground Copenhagen Metro station located at Enghave Plads in the Vesterbro district of Copenhagen, Denmark. The station is on the City Circle Line (M3), between Copenhagen Central Station and Frederiksberg Allé, and is in fare zone 1. Nearby landmarks include the music venue Vega, Enghave Park and the shopping and restaurant street Istedgade.

== History ==
The station was opened on 29 September 2019 together with 16 other stations of the line.

== Design ==
The escalator shaft is clad with red, ceramic panels, a reference to the red brick buildings that line the square.

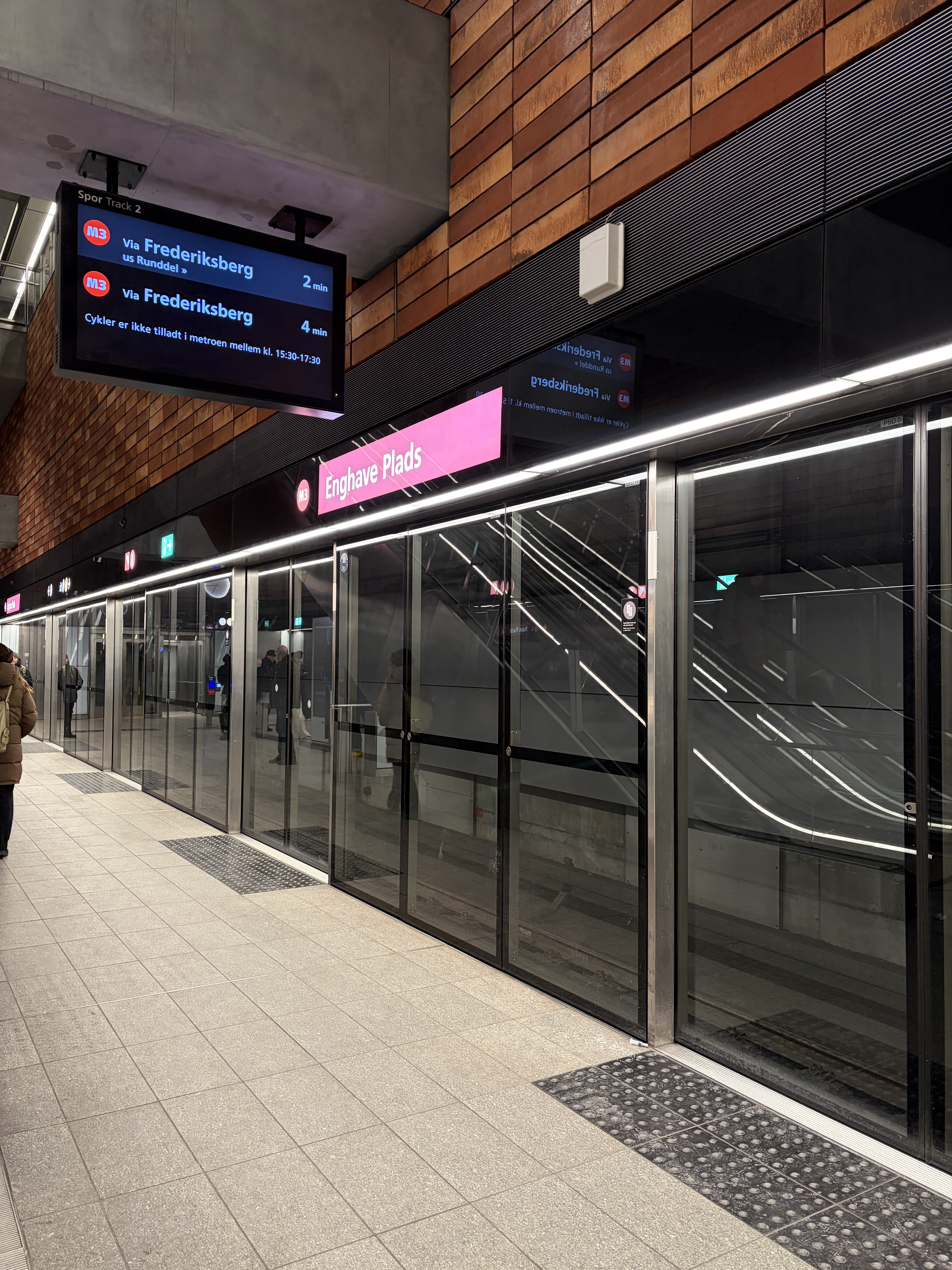
Signage and doors at platform level.

== Service ==
Preceding station	Copenhagen Metro	Following station
Frederiksberg Allé clockwise	M3	Copenhagen Central counter-clockwise
