= Arthur Wittmaack =

Danish architect

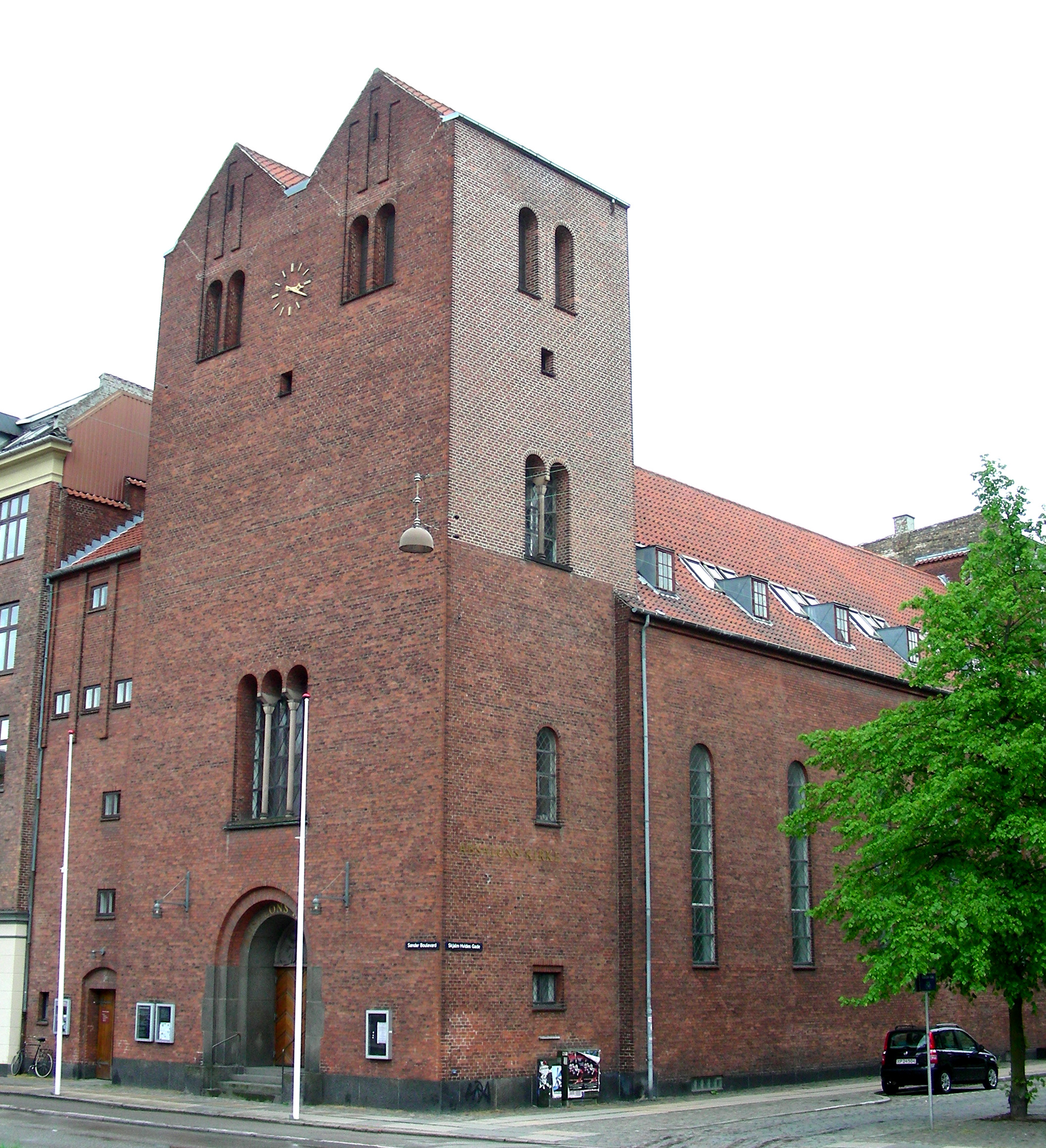
Absalon's Church in Copenhagen

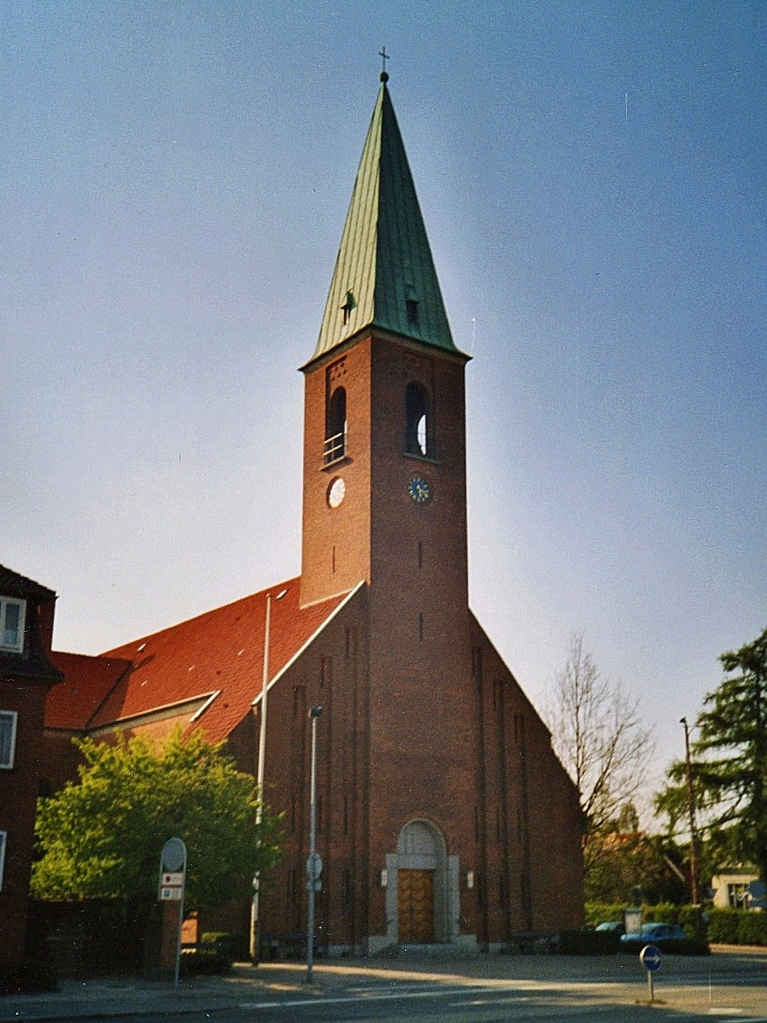
Helleruplund Church in Gentofte

Arthur Carl Johann Wittmaack (2 June 1878 – 30 October 1965) was a Danish architect. His work was part of the architecture event in the art competition at the 1928 Summer Olympics.

== Biography ==
Wittmaack was born in Malmö, Sweden. He was the son of Johannes Wittmaack and Adamine Petersen. Wittmaack studied at the Academy of Fine Arts Vienna from 1899-1900. He joined the firm of Vilhelm Hvalsøe from 1916. His earliest designs were of Neoclassical architecture, while the later works were representative of functionalism.

He exhibited at Charlottenborg Spring Exhibition (1917), at Stockholm (1918) and at the Brussels International Exposition (1935). He also exhibited in Oslo, Berlin, Paris and the Netherlands.

He was married in 1910 with Emilie Katarine Wittmaack (1884-1974). He died during 1965 in the United States.

== Selected designs ==
- Axelborg on Vesterbrogade in Copenhagen
- Absalon's Church in the Absalons parish of Copenhagen
- Helleruplund Church in the Diocese of Helsingør in Copenhagen
