= Vilhelm Hvalsøe =

Danish architect (1883–1958)

Frederik Vilhelm Hvalsøe (23 May 1883, Holbæk - 3 March 1958, Copenhagen) was a Danish architect.

== Biography ==
Hvalsøe was born at Holbæk on the island of Zealand, Denmark. He attended the Royal Danish Academy of Fine Arts from 1905 to 1916. He was most notable for his collaborations with Arthur Wittmaack with whom he started an architectural firm in 1916. The firm principally designed buildings in and around Copenhagen, Denmark. Hvalsøe participated in the 1928 Summer Olympics in Amsterdam in the category of architecture. Together with Wittmaack, he exhibited at the Brussels International Exposition (1935).

== Gallery ==
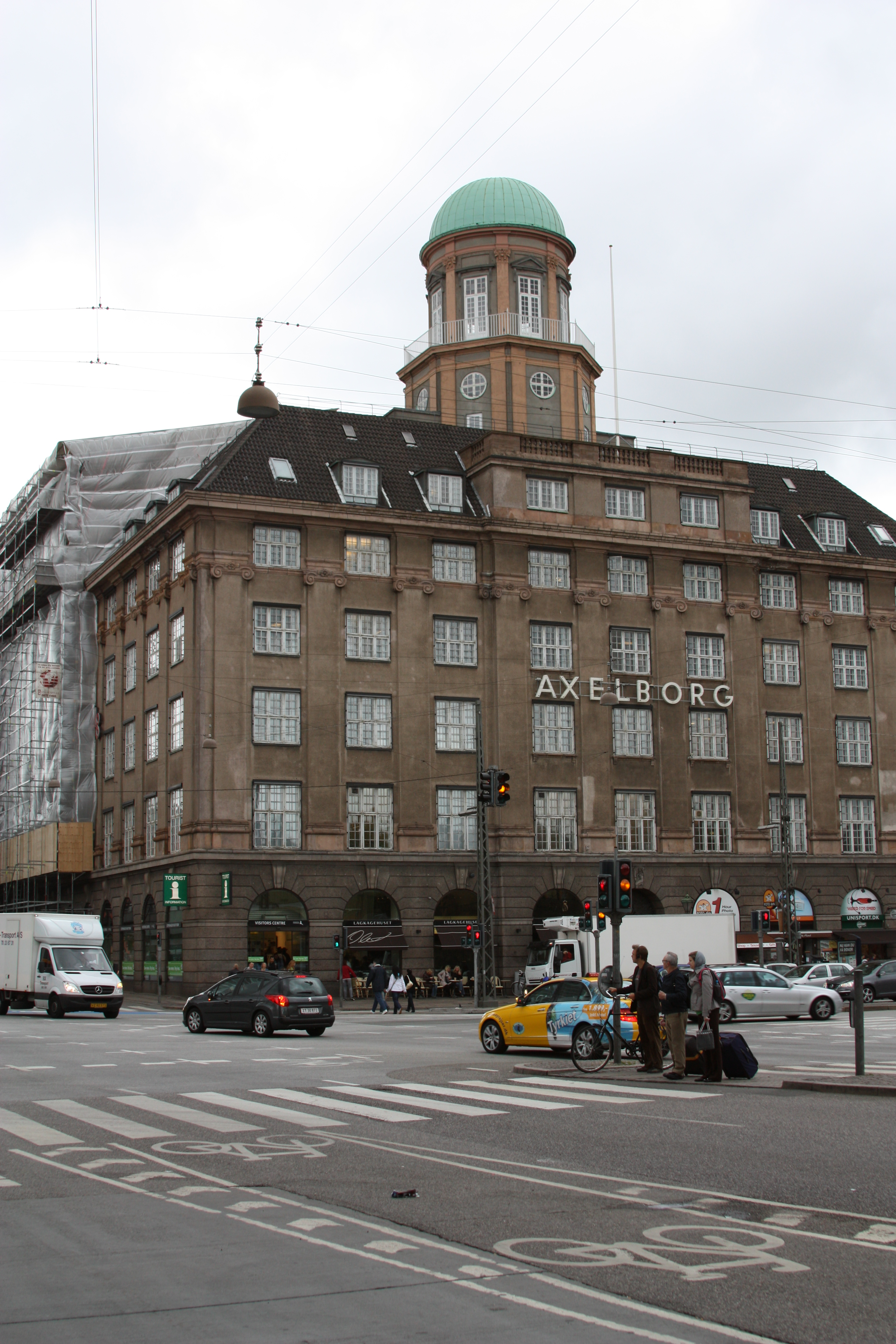
Axelborg

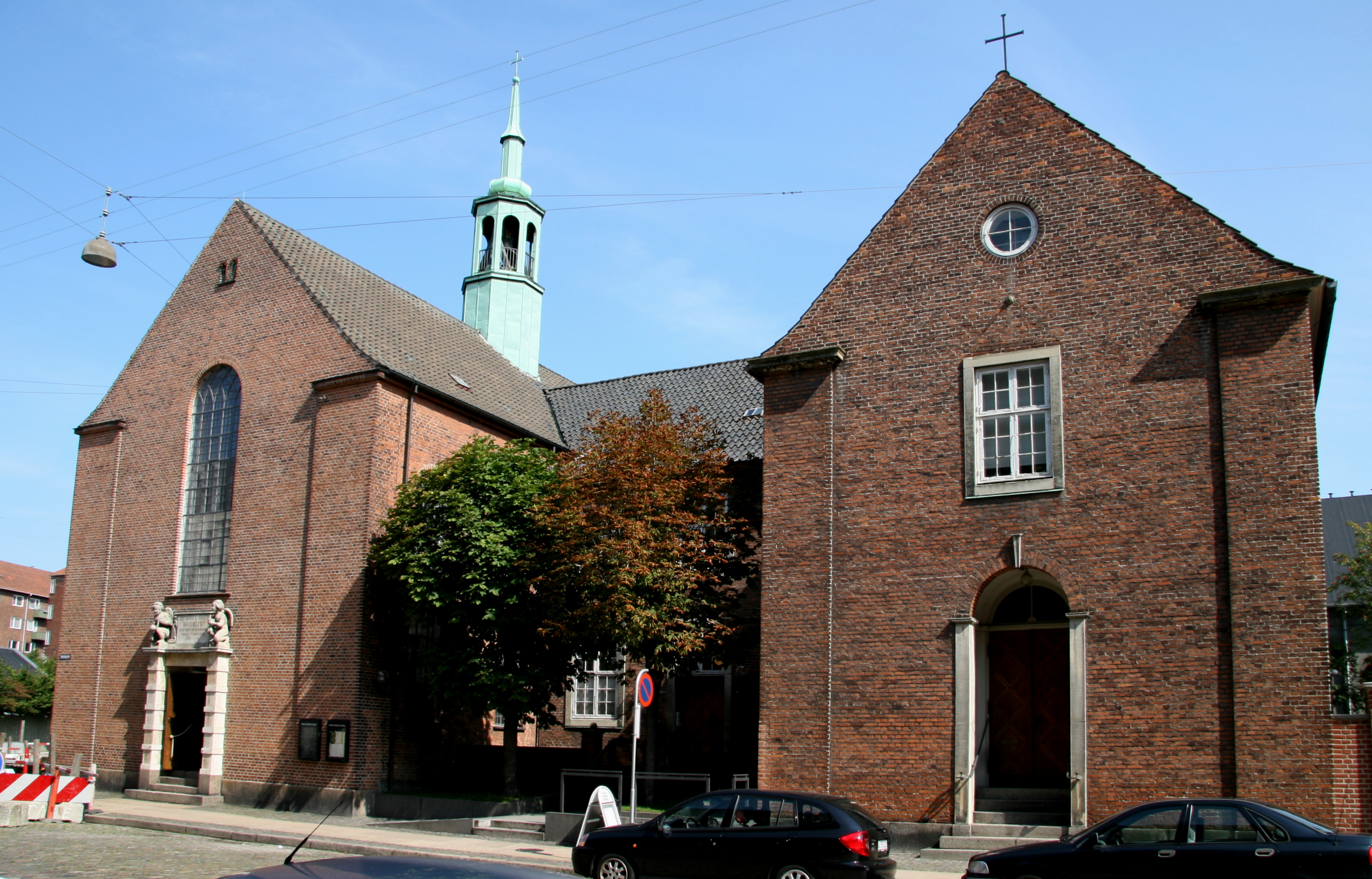
Hans Egede Church

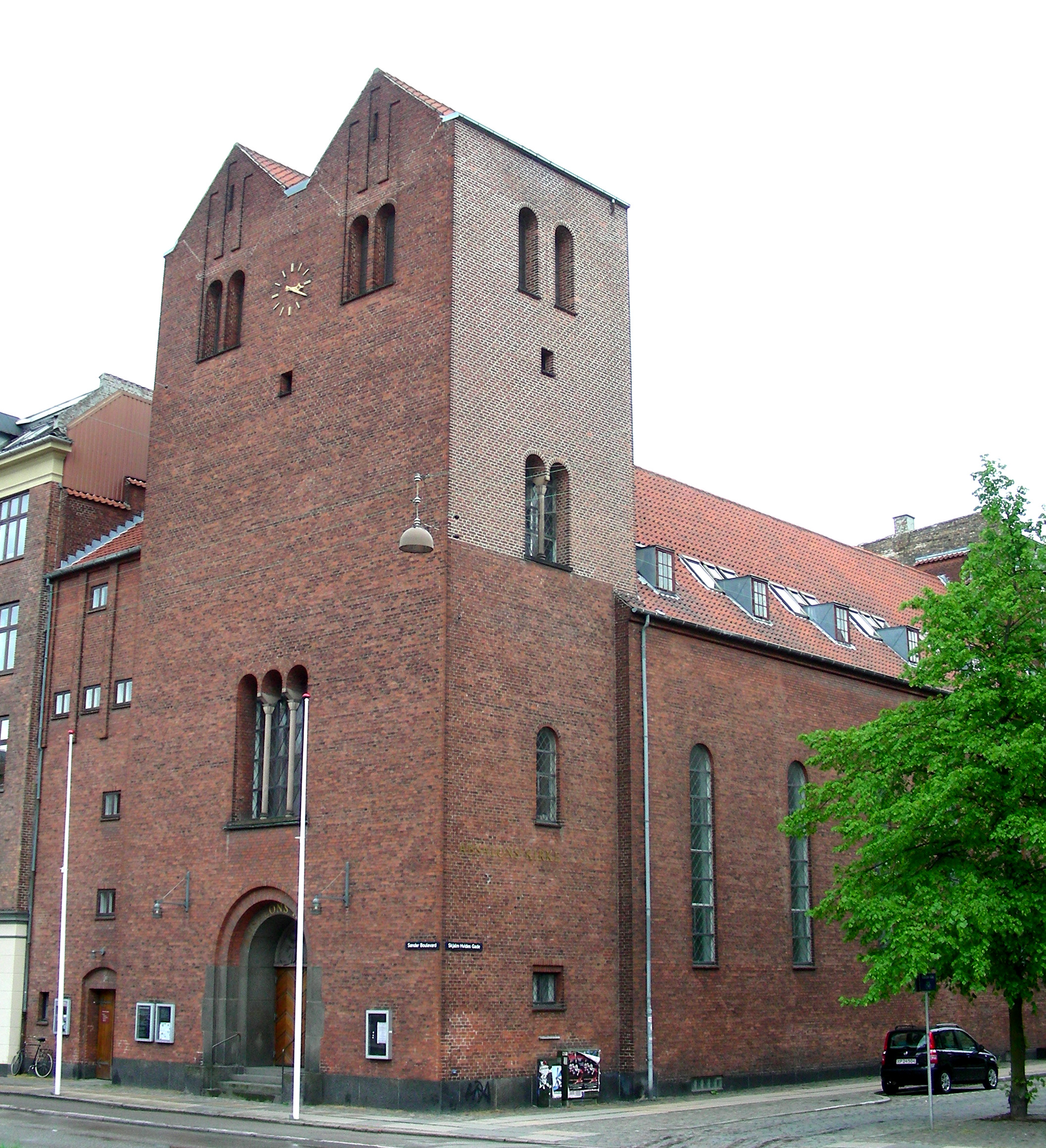
Absalon Church

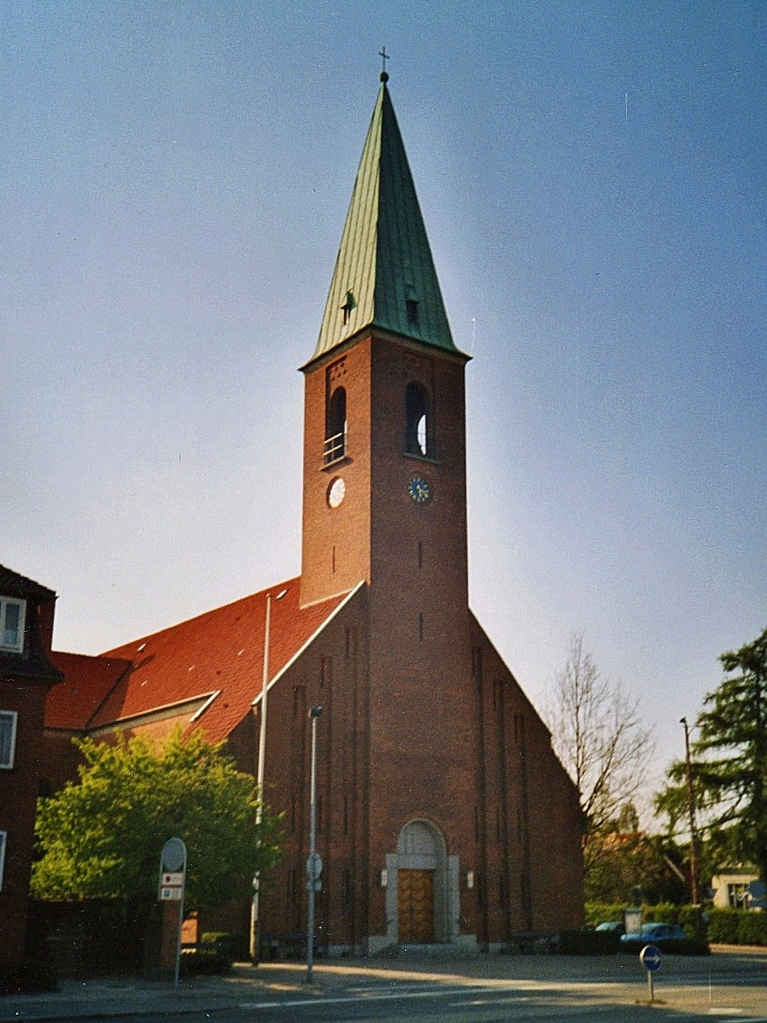
Helleruplund Church
