= International Computer Music Conference =

Yearly international conference for computer music researchers and composers

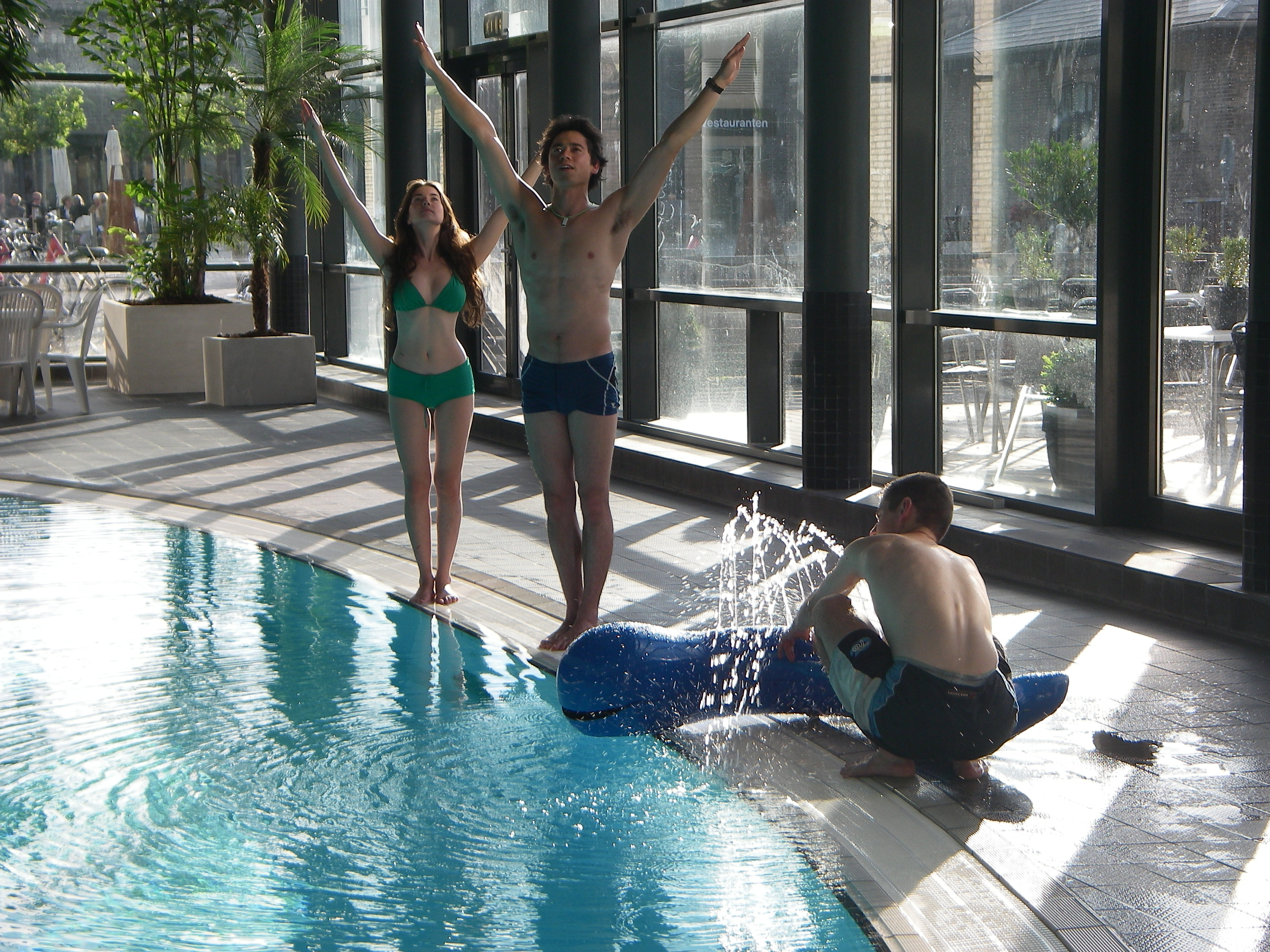
- The theme for ICMC 2007 was "Immersed Music". In keeping with this theme, there was an underwater hydraulophone performance at the DGI-byen swimcenter Vandkulturhuset.
- Genre: Electronic music
- Location: Worldwide
- Years active: 1974–present
- Website: ICMA

The International Computer Music Conference (ICMC) is a yearly international conference for computer music researchers and composers. It is the annual conference of the International Computer Music Association (ICMA).

== History ==
In 1986, the Institute of Sonology institute was moved to the Royal Conservatory of The Hague, hosting the International Computer Music Conference there during its inaugural year.

Each year there is a specific theme. For example, in 2007, the theme was "Immersed Music" and immersive media. ICMC 2007 took place in Copenhagen. On August 28, there was an "Underwater/Water Concert" at the DGI-byen swimcenter, in the hundred-metre DGI-byen pool, as well as the various other pools of the Vandkulturhuset.

This "Immersed Music" theme of ICMC 2007 explored important issues in musical instrument classification and immersion.

2014 40th ICMC is organised joint with the 11th Sound and Music Computing Conference in Athens, Greece 14–20 September 2014.

2017 43rd ICMC took place from Oct 16, 2017 - Oct 20, 2017 in Shanghai, China. 2018 44th ICMC took place from 5–10 August 2018 in Daegu, Korea.

== See also ==
- List of electronic music festivals
