= J-Popcon =

Anime convention in Denmark

- Status: Active
- Genre: Japanese Culture
- Venue: DGI-byen
- Locations: Copenhagen, Denmark
- Country: Denmark
- Inaugurated: October 2000
- Attendance: 3,700 in 2016
- Organizer: J-Popkai
- Filing status: Nonprofit
- Website: http://www.j-popcon.dk/

J-Popcon is the oldest and largest convention in Denmark with focus on anime, manga, cosplay and other aspects of the Japanese popular culture. It is held in Copenhagen, and hosts the Danish qualification round for the World Cosplay Summit in Nagoya, Japan, one of the Danish qualification rounds for EuroCos in London, England, and the Danish qualification round for ECG in Paris, France.

== History ==
Dates	Location	Atten.	Guests
October 20–22, 2000	Valby Medborgerhus; Copenhagen	200	
Oct 22 - Nov 2, 2003	Valby Medborgerhus; Copenhagen		
November 5–7, 2004	Valby Medborgerhus; Copenhagen		
November 4–6, 2005	Valby Medborgerhus; Copenhagen		Junko Mizuno
November 3–5, 2006	Valby Medborgerhus; Copenhagen		Kazuki Takahashi
November 2–4, 2007	Valby Medborgerhus; Copenhagen		Yoshiyuki Sadamoto, Hiroyuki Yamaga, Michihiko Suwa and Nimura - judge from World Cosplay Summit
November 7–9, 2008	Valby Medborgerhus; Copenhagen		Kenjiro Morimoto
November 6–8, 2009	Valby Medborgerhus; Copenhagen		
November 12–14, 2010	DGI-byen; Copenhagen	2,200	Cécile Auclair, Eva Alaime, Haruko Momoi, Iris Rönkkö, Katharina O., Laura Salviani, Vic Mignogna
November 11–13, 2011	DGI-byen; Copenhagen	2,390	Yamazaki Urita
March 15–17, 2013	DGI-byen; Copenhagen	2,303	Yaya Han, John Catho Kristiansen, Jenni Källberg, Ronald Boom, Kimberley van den Hurk
March 27–29, 2014	DGI-byen; Copenhagen	2,500	YOHIO, Reika
February 20–22, 2015	DGI-byen; Copenhagen	3,000	Charles Martinet, Lisle Wilkerson, Yuegene Fay, JHart, Ameno Kitarou
March 18–20, 2016	DGI-byen; Copenhagen	3,700	Color-Code, Ann Hjort, Thomas Kirk, Peter Zhelder
April 21–23, 2017	DGI-byen; Copenhagen	3,500	FEMM, PLASTICZOOMS, LucioleS, Team Paraluna, Major Sam, Rinaca, Silje Danielsen, YumiKoyuki
April 27–29, 2018	DGI-byen; Copenhagen	2,700	TBA

== Activities ==
The event has hosted several activities in the past including a calligraphy event hosted by the Japanese embassy. The event also has featured a maid cafe.
