= Warehouse 9 =

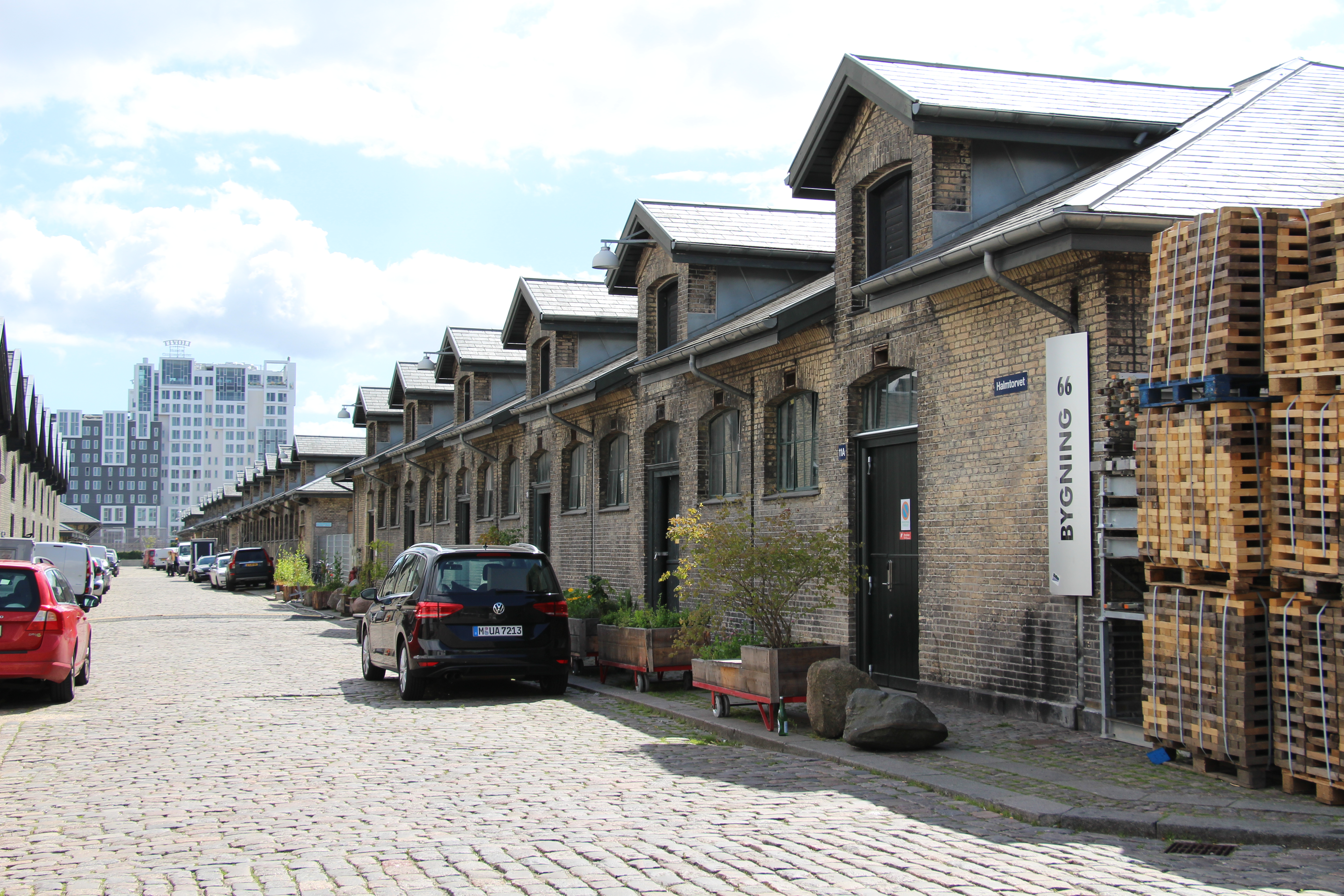
Halmtorvet 11 where Warehouse 9 is located.

Warehouse9 is a performance art venue, art gallery and a social space for the queer community. The venue was established in 2007 by Jørgen Callesen and Christian van Schijndel in a historical stable building located in the former meatpacking district of Copenhagen, Denmark. The venue hosts events from an intersection of the music, art, theatre and nightclubbing scenes.

Warehouse9 is an artist-run space and is supported by the Danish Arts Foundation. Every month the venue presents an array of concerts, events and exhibitions, often taking a subcultural and experimental approach. The venue hosts events and festivals. Since 2008 the venue has been running the International Performance Art Festival (IPAF), where international artists are invited to perform, exhibit in the venue's two galleries, conduct research, host events and give artist talks.

Invited artists have included Princess Hans, Penny Arcade, Kris Grey, Eisa Jocson, Narcissister, Juli Apponen, Leman Sevda Daricioglu and Samira Ellagoz.

From 2014 to 2018 Warehouse9 was part of the EU project People´s Smart Sculpture (PS2), which fostered new and innovative approaches to participative urban re-design and urban development. PS2 took the form of 11 sub-projects in cities across eight European countries, using social art and activism as well as digital tools and methodologies. The study about the project can be downloaded here: Best practice study
