= Kødbyen =

District in Copenhagen, Denmark

Coordinates: 55°40′03″N 12°33′35″E

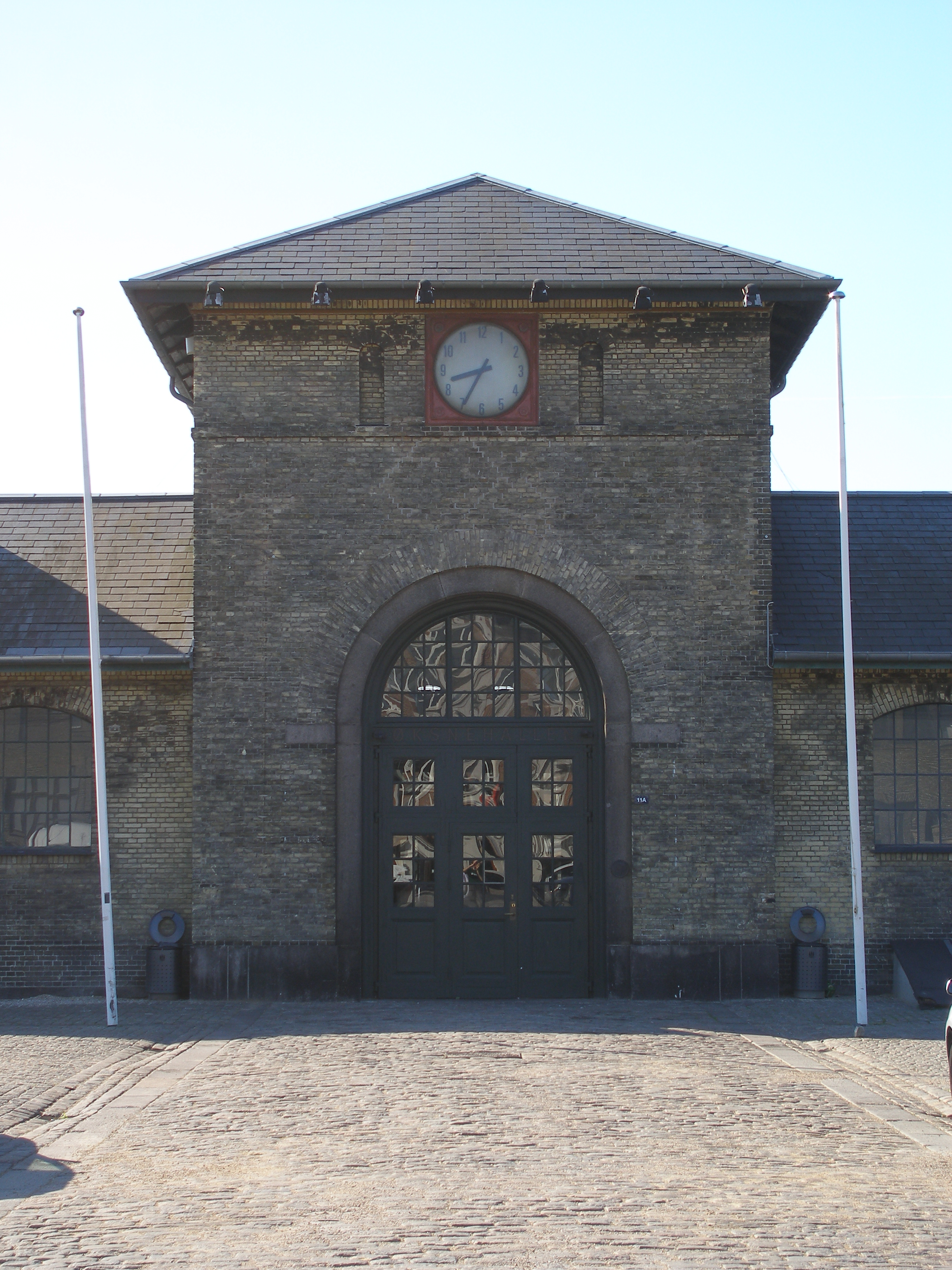
Entrance to Øksnehallen

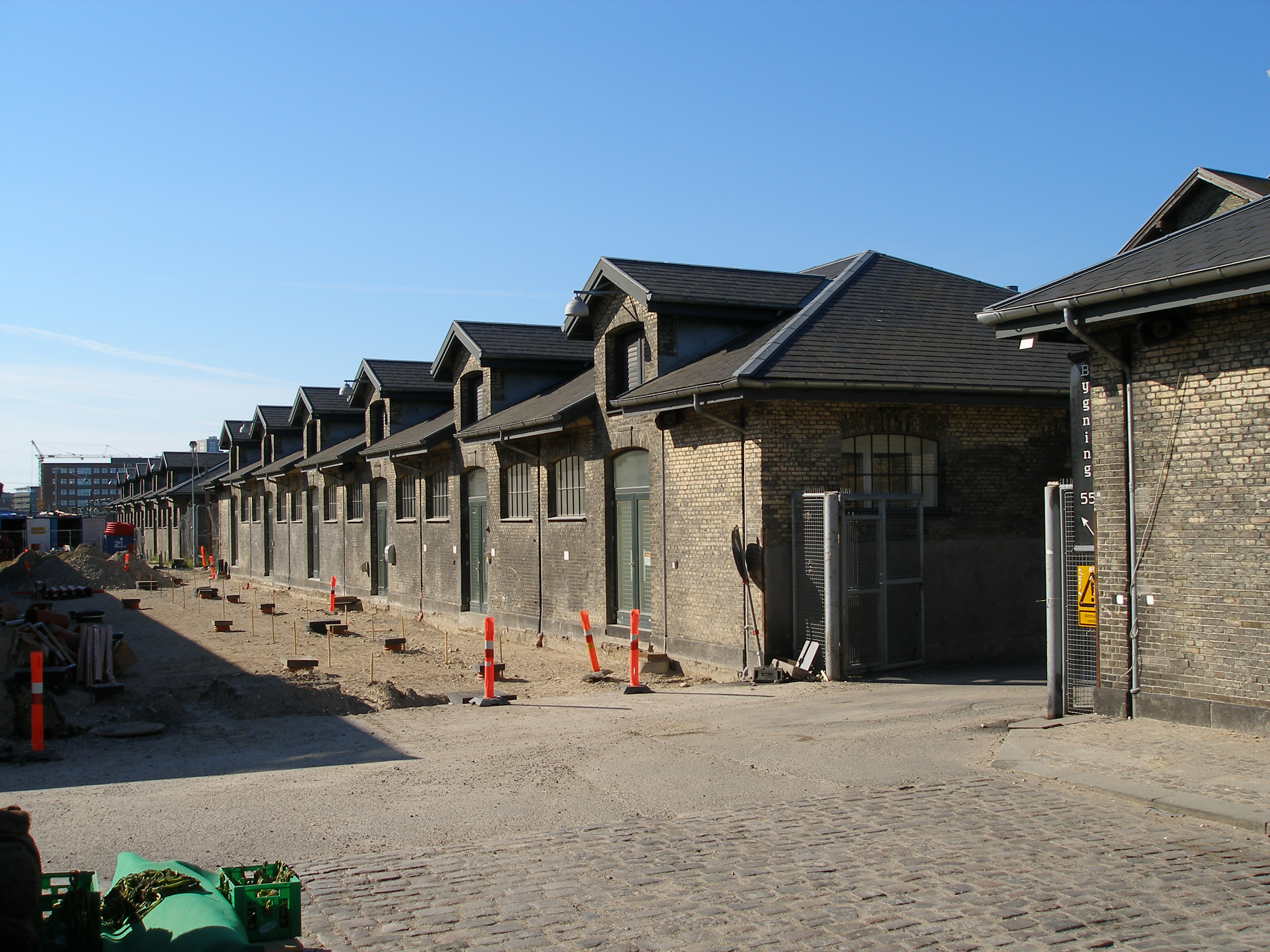
Slagtehusgade, former slaughterhouses in the Brown Meat District, now housing various creative venues

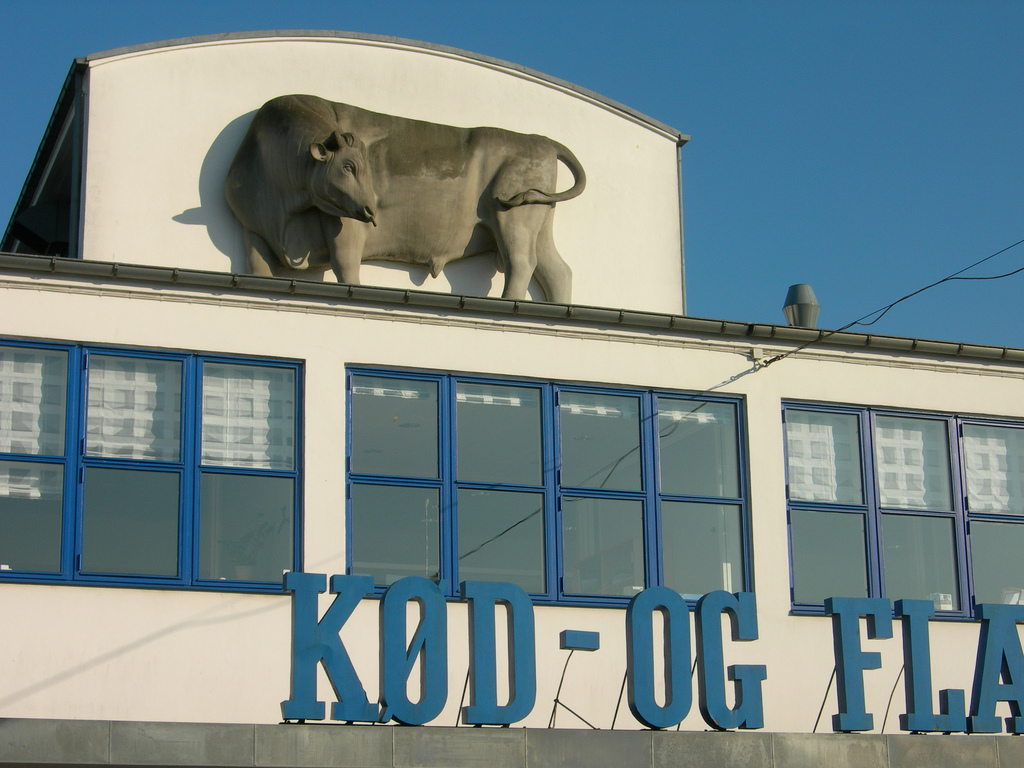
Detail of main building, the White Kødby

Kødbyen (lit. 'the meat-town'; also known as the Meat District or Meatpacking District, after the New York Meatpacking District) is a district of Vesterbro in Copenhagen, Denmark. It is situated between the railway lines going into Copenhagen Central Station and Sønder Boulevard. The district consists of three separate areas, referred to as the White, Grey and Brown Kødby for the dominant colour of their buildings.

The brown part (Den brune Kødby) is the oldest area, closest to the Central Station, and dating from 1883. It has since c. 2000 been changed into a new creative cluster with galleries, art cafés, nightlife and small creative businesses like studios and architecture firms in the historical buildings. It is also home to DGI-byen, a sports, swimming and conference complex, and the exhibition hall Øksnehallen, originally a stabling place for 1,600 cattle before slaughtering.

The newer white area (Den hvide Kødby) is a 400 × 600 m enclave of white modernistic structures, built in 1934 to the design of city architect Poul Holsøe. The area is listed for conservation and is still serving its original purpose of housing businesses relating to the meat industry, such as the Inco cash and carry wholesale warehouse for the catering business and the Copenhagen Hospitality College. A municipal master plan aims at creating a mixed-use area, encouraging cultural, design, and gastronomy businesses to settle there, while retaining the meat industry.

The smaller grey district has been revitalized to a lesser extent than the aforementioned white and brown areas, still having a low-scale meat industry. Nonetheless, it still contains restaurants, residences, and offices and has importance in Danish industrial history.

== History ==
=== First stages ===
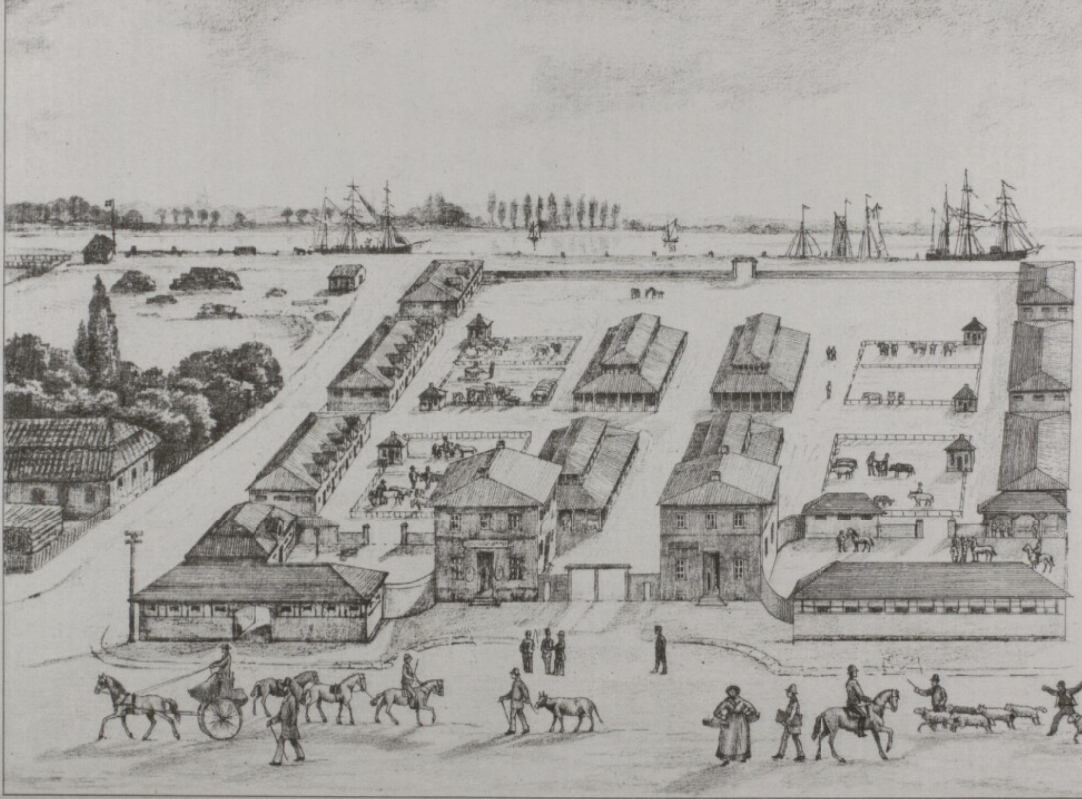
Copenhagen's new cattle market, 1881

In 1671 a cattle market was established at the private initiative of Court Butcher Niels Olufsen at the border of Frederiksberg and Vesterbro. Called Trommesalen (English: "The Drum Hall") because it was opened to the sound of a drum in the morning, it remained the main cattle market of the area for more than two centuries.

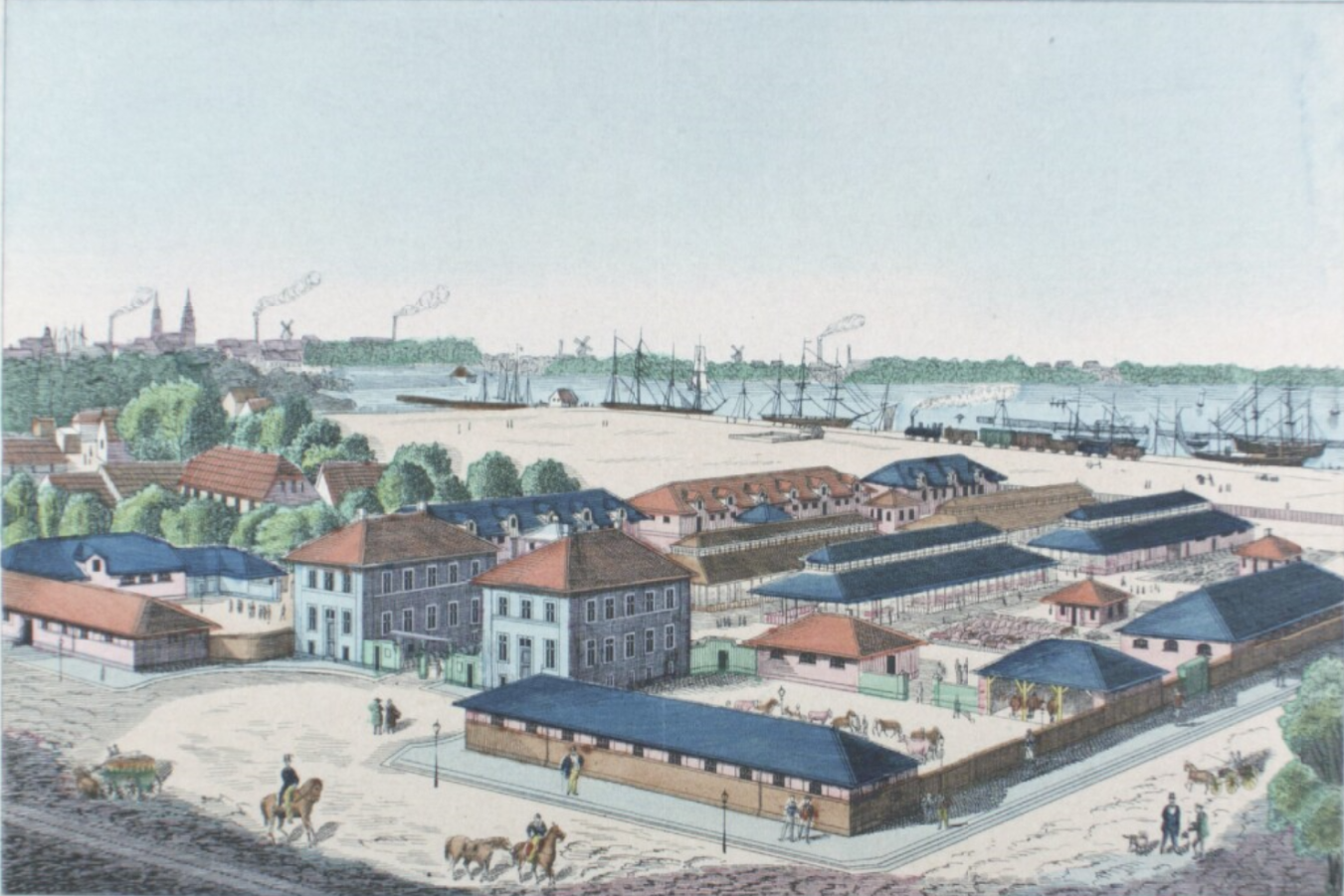
Copenhagen's new cattle market

In 1878, due to shortage of space and fear of cholera epidemics, the City decided to construct a new cattle market. A municipal committee suggested a location at Kalvebod Beach, which at the time was situated where the square Halmtorvet (English: Haymarket) is today. The site was located on the grounds of a large estate which the city had acquired from the Royal Copenhagen Shooting Society in 1870. The new cattle market was constructed partly on an area previously occupied by shooting ranges, partly on new land reclaimed along Kalvebod Beach.

The new market opened on 28 November 1879, planned and designed by architect Hans Jørgen Holm. The market, stretching from Halmtorvet to the gasworks harbour, was bissected by a broad internal road lined with cattle stables, sheep pens and dealers offices on both sides. In 1883, three slaughterhouses for cattle were constructed and later a slaughterhouse for pigs and two slaughterhouses for cattle, calves and lambs were added. The market area also housed cooling houses and various rendering businesses like tallow melting houses and blood dryers producing blood meal.

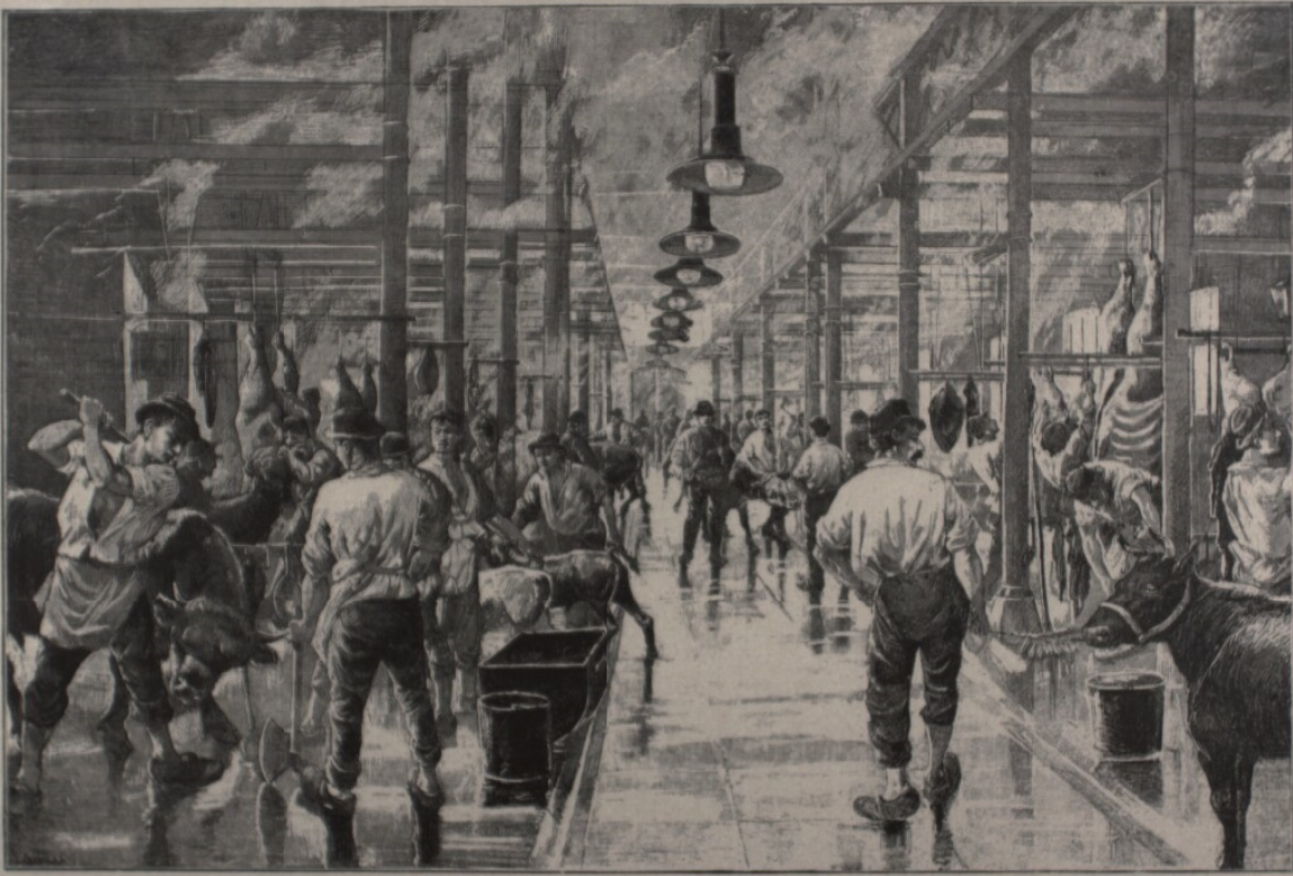
Knud Gamborg: In a slaughterhouse at Kødbyen

As a result of the improved conditions at the new cattle market, all slaughterings at the numerous private open air stockyards around the city were prohibited starting 1 January 1888, and all slaughterings had to take place in the public slaughterhouses. Mandatory meat control was also introduced, requiring all fresh meat coming into the city to be inspected and stamped.

In 1901, the cattle market was extended with construction of Øksnehallen, a 5,200 m^{2} market hall. It housed dealers' offices and had a capacity for 1600 head of cattle. The extension also included new pens for cattle and sheep and was built by city architect L. P. Fenger.

With the construction of Øksnehallen, the city's attention became directed at the morning trade in fresh pork meat, at that time taking place at Gammeltorv and Nytorv, and it was decided also to construct a market hall for trade in pork. With no vacant space at the cattle market area, the new market hall was placed on reclaimed land where the Falck Headquarters is today. On April 15, 1910, the a new complex was inaugurated. Besides a 6,500 m^{2} market hall, it included a cooling house, laboratories and administration. From that date forward all trade in pork at Gammeltorv was prohibited, although the so-called Chicken Ladies were still allowed to sell poultry by the Caritas Well. In 1925 the market hall was extended with a new hall for trade in poultry and two new cooling houses, and two years later, in 1927, the poultry vendors were banned from Gammeltorv.

=== The modern meat market ===
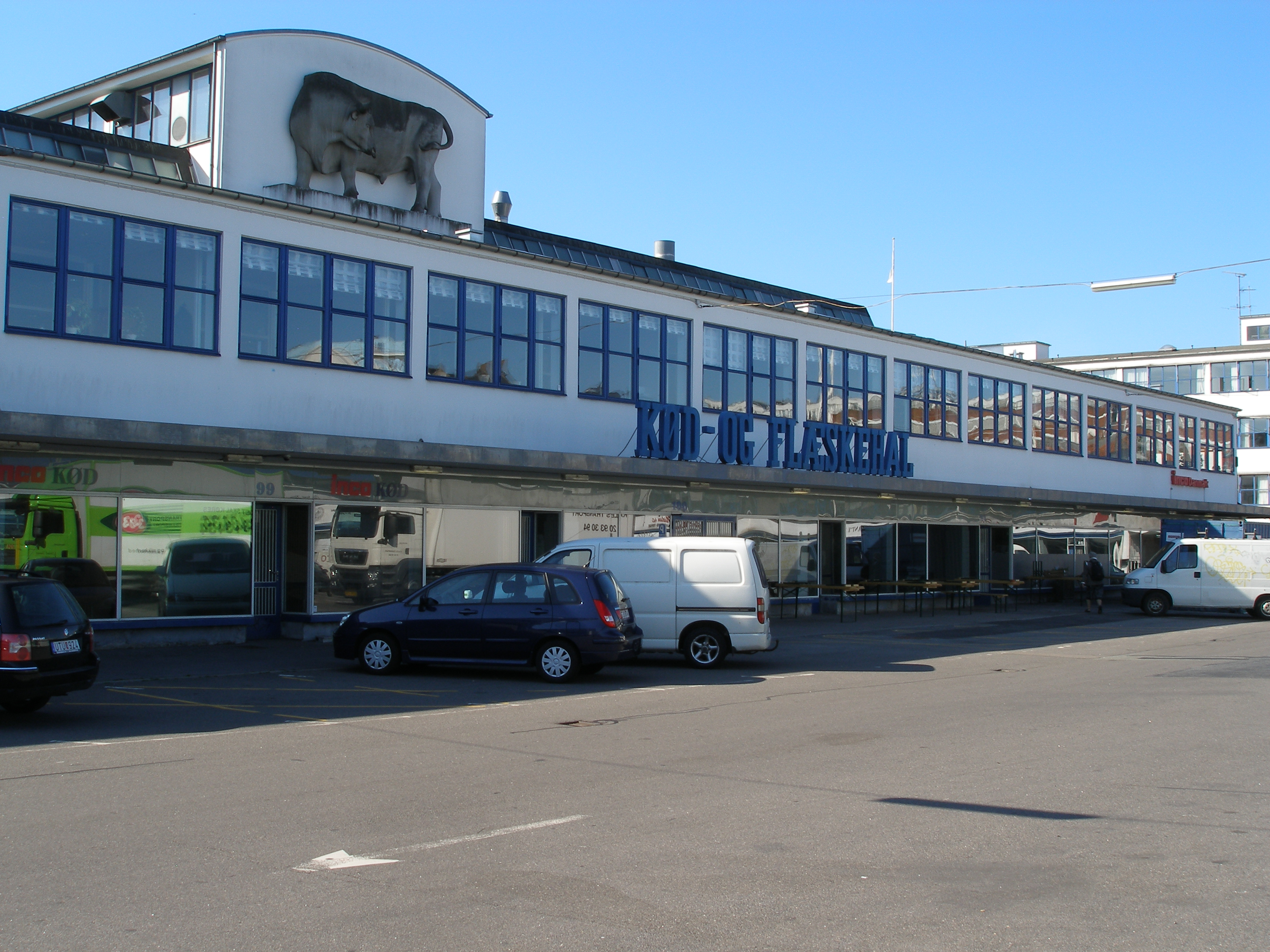
Flæskehallen ("The Pork Hall"), the White Kødby

The many extensions and changes in applied technologies had at that time left the market area in a chaotic and unsatisfactory state. When the neighbouring gasworks closed it was therefore decided to use the vacant land, an area of 15.5 hectares, for a rational rearrangement of the market activities, including market halls, slaughterhouses and related industries in a common scheme.

Planning of the new meatpacking district started in 1928 under the direction of city architect Poul Helsøe, according to his design. In October 1932, the new Slaughterhouse and various other buildings were inaugurated, and on April 15, 1934, the new Pork Market Hall and Poultry Market Hall were ready. The development also included a total of 46,000 m^{2} of rental buildings for businesses in the meat sector.

== The Meat District today ==
Though the Meat District has remained a locus for companies and activities relating to the meat and food industry, these original functions take up much less space, and since the early 2000s, the area has been changing into a new creative cluster with galleries, restaurants, nightlife and small creative businesses such as studios and architecture firms.

=== Popular venues ===
- Øksnehallen: A 5,200 m^{2} exhibition venue, located in the former cattle market hall of the Brown Kødby
- Sort/Hvid, a theatre, newly built at Staldgade 26-30 in 2016
- Pate Pate: The first restaurant to open in the meatpacking district
- V1 Gallery: Another high-profile commercial art gallery.
- Karriere Bar An arts bar and restaurant featuring a large number of site-specific artworks and hosting various parties and cultural events
- Warehouse 9, performance space and art venue
- Galleri Bo Bjarregård: a leading commercial art gallery
- Kifak, venue for LBGTQ ethnic minority group Sabaah
- Kødboderne 18, a night club
- Jolene: A popular bar, relocated from Nørrebro
- Vestauranten: A restaurant located in the Brown Kødby, operated by the neighbouring DGI-byen.
- Kødbyens Fiskebar Opened in 2008 by a former Noma sommelier, Anders Selmer and partners
- Warpigs: Brewpub opened in early 2015
- Bakken: Opened in 2010
- Mesteren & Lærlingen: Small bar sometimes having live music, packed outdoor during summer, generally place to start by the crowd
- Mother: Organic Pizza place, serves brunch also
- Tommi"s Burger: Icelandic burger place
- Noho: Cocktail bar

== Cultural references ==
Kødbyen (Flæsketorvet 41) is used as location at 0:35:09 in the 1978 Olsen-banden film The Olsen Gang Sees Red.
