= Jeppe Hein =

Danish artist (born 1974)

- Born: 1974 (age 51–52); Copenhagen, Denmark
- Education: Royal Danish Academy of Art (1997-2003); Städelschule (1999-2000)
- Known for: Sculpture and installation

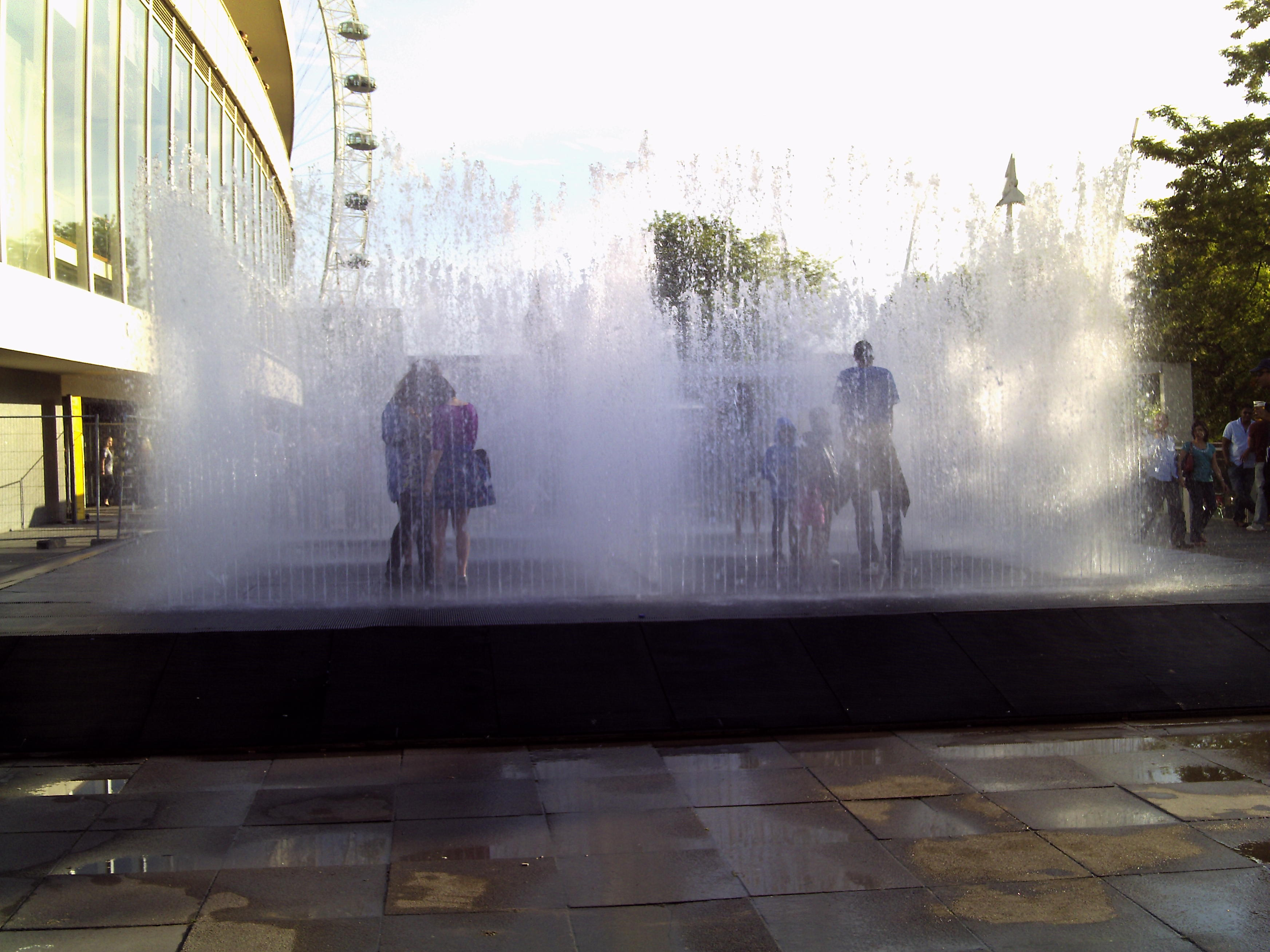
Appearing Rooms by Jeppe Hein, water fountains at the South Bank Centre, London.

Jeppe Hein (born 1 August 1974) is an artist based in Berlin and Copenhagen. His interactive sculptures and installations combine elements of humour with the 1970s traditions of minimalism and conceptual art.

== Education ==
Hein studied at the Royal Danish Academy of Art between 1997 and 2003 and at the Städelschule in Frankfurt between 1999 and 2000 (while registered as an associate student of the Danish Academy). As a student Hein was co-founder of OTTO, a non-commercial organisation that organised art exhibitions at various venues in Denmark between 1997 and 2000.

== Work ==
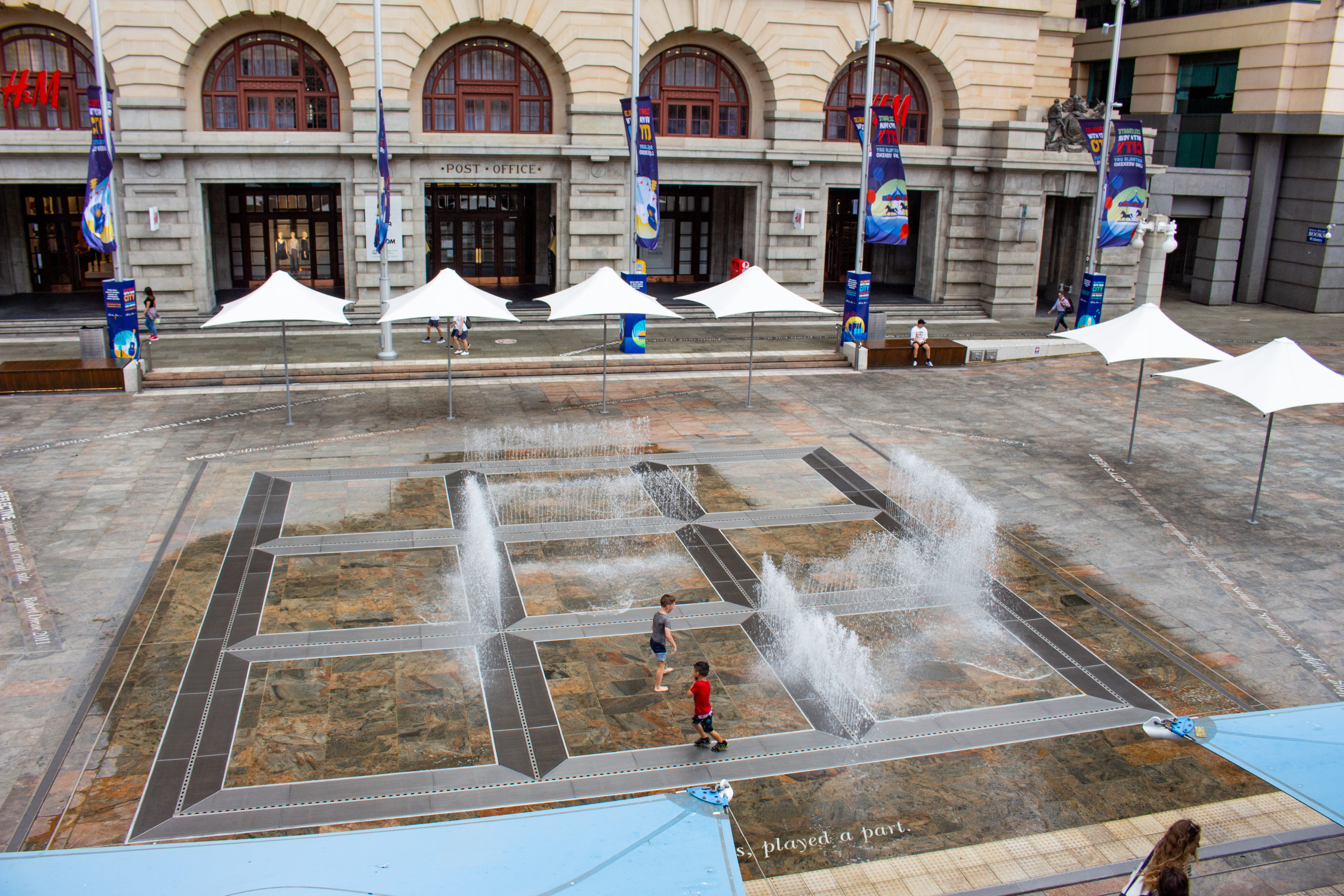
Water Labyrinth in Forrest Place, Perth

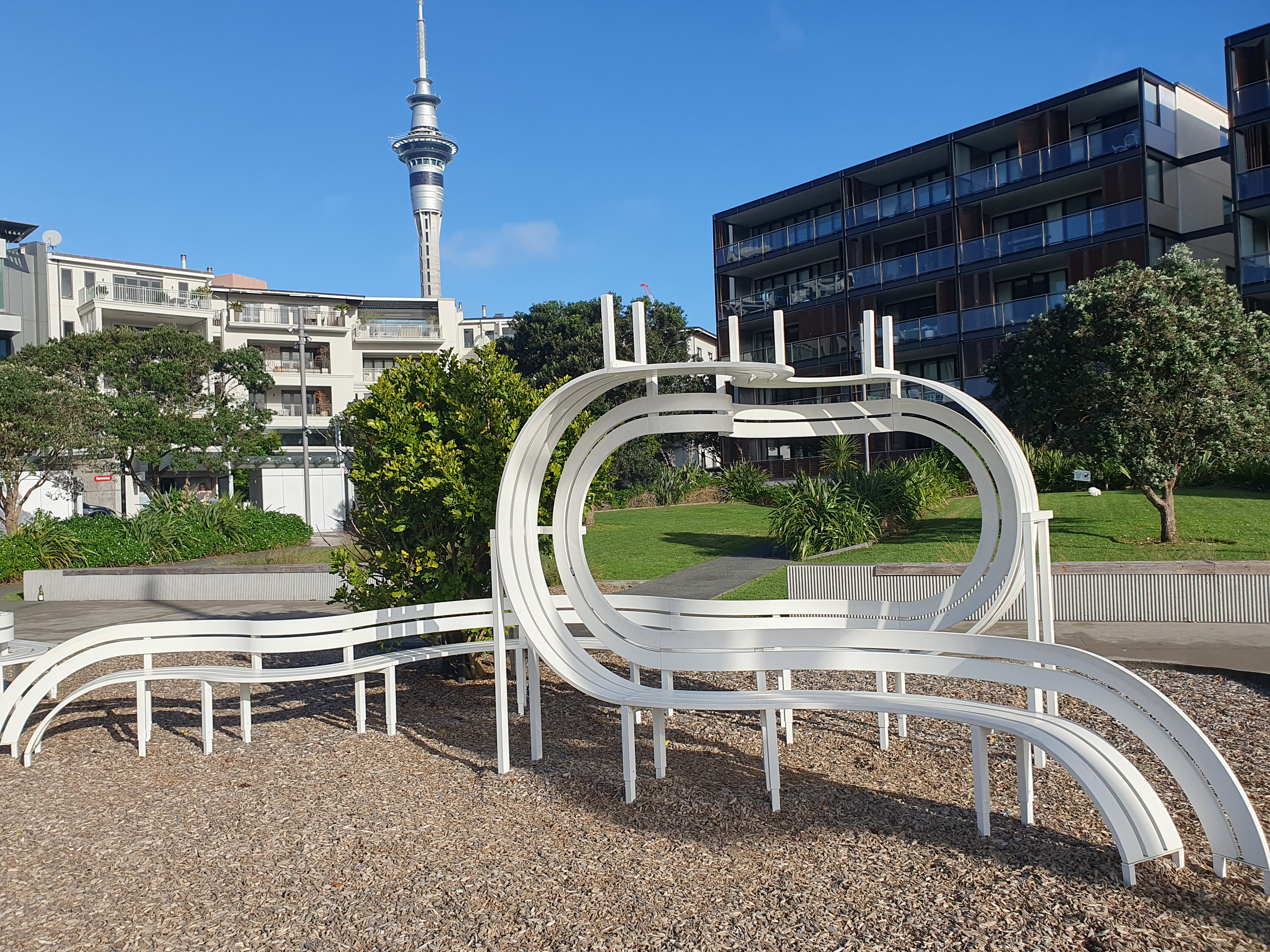
Long Modified Bench (2015) at Viaduct Harbour, Auckland

In 2008, Hein collaborated with Dan Graham on a temporary pavilion in Cologne.

Between September 2009 and January 2010, Hein stayed at Alexander Calder’s studio in Saché, France, as a part of an artist in residence programme.

Modified Social Benches located in the Montenmedio Sculpture Park, Cadiz, Spain. These benches are also located in other places around the world, including Miami, Helsinki, Auckland and Thun, Switzerland. They are also found on the campus of Claremont McKenna College, his first work for a U.S college.

=== Folly ===
At Houghton Hall in Norfolk, the Marquess of Cholmondeley commissioned an "artlandish" folly in a scale appropriate for a five-acre walled garden. Hein created a site-specific outdoor sculpture for this space. In all seasons, this jet of water surmounted by a ball of flame illustrates a 21st-century folly on a smaller scale than other contemporary land art pieces in the parkland outside the garden enclosure. The work is intended "to surprise viewers and make them question what they are seeing." Hein wants to elicit

"... an incongruous dialogue between the art and the viewer and to use humour to broaden the limits of conceptual art. I want to show that the work isn’t anything on its own, it is only what the public informs it with. The viewers’ role brings the piece to the centre of attention."

=== Karriere Bar ===
Hein is co-founder of Karriere Bar, a bar and restaurant in Copenhagen featuring site-specific artworks by international artists, which he founded with his sister Lærke Hein.

== Exhibitions ==
Hein has had solo exhibitions at the 21st Century Museum of Contemporary Art, Kanazawa; and Art Tower, Mito; the Neues Museum, Nürnberg; Indianapolis Museum of Art (2010); Perth Institute of Contemporary Arts; ARoS Aarhus Kunstmuseum, Århus (2009); Sculpture Center, New York; and P.S.1 MOMA, New York (2004). He has participated in solo and group exhibitions at Museum of Contemporary Art, Chicago; Contemporary Art Gallery, Vancouver; Tate Modern, London; Barbican Art Centre, London (2007); Centre Georges Pompidou, Paris; MOCA, Los Angeles; and 50th Venice Biennale (2003). Catalogues of Hein's work have been published by ARoS Aarhus Kunstmuseum, Musée d'art contemporain de Nîmes, Koenig Books, Villa Manin, and the Centre Pompidou. Hein lives and works in Berlin.

== Catalogs ==
- Jeppe Hein Until Now, catalog, Koenig Books, London, 2005.
- Invisible Labyrinth, catalog of the exhibition at the Pompidou Center (Paris), Area 315, Sept. 15-14 November 2005.
- Take a Walk in the Forest at Sunlight, an exhibition catalog to the Kunstverein Heilbronn, 2003.

== See also ==
- List of invisible artworks
