= Halmtorvet =

Public square

Coordinates: 55.6699°N 12.5595°E

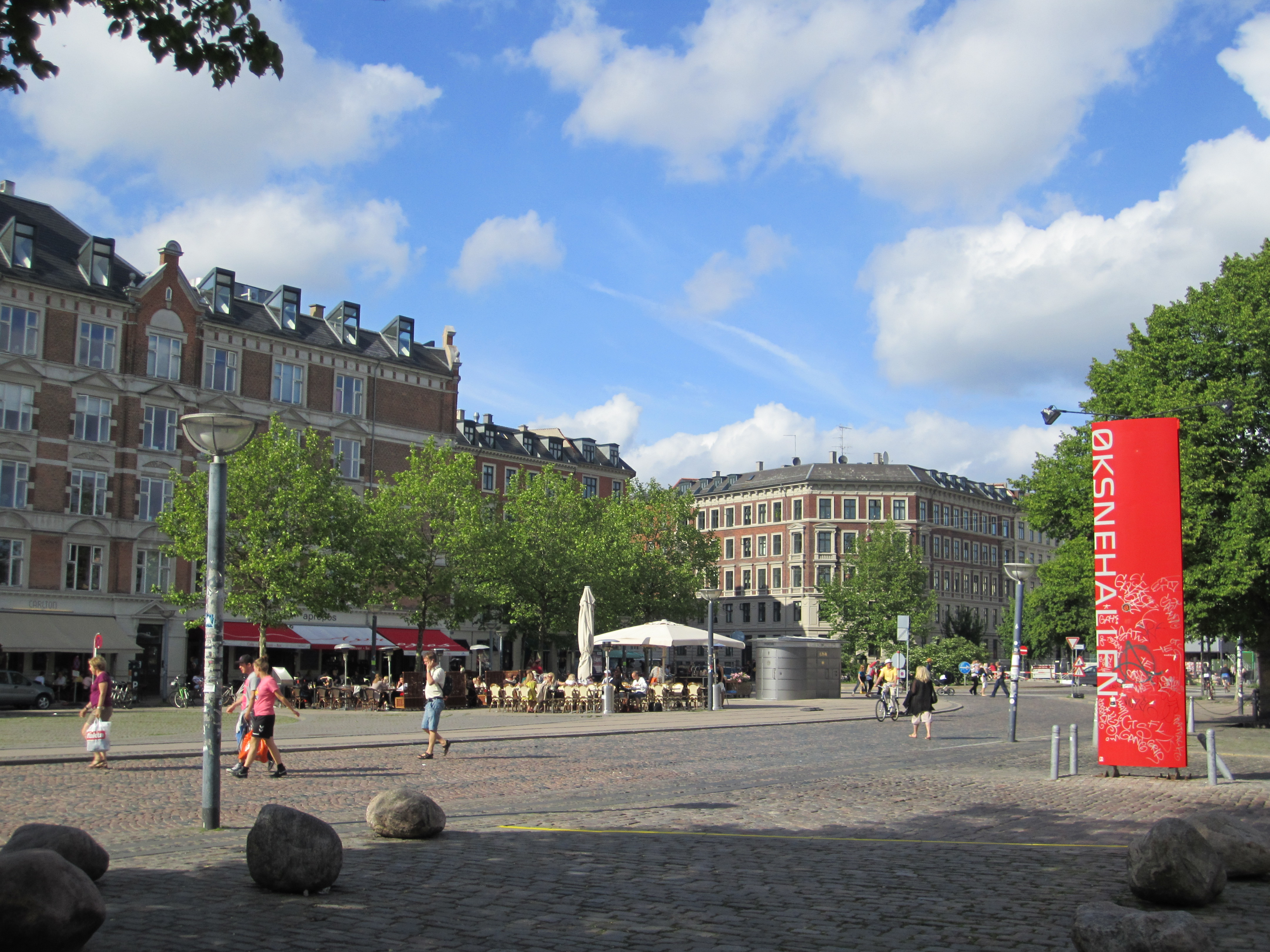
Halmtorvet seen from the entrance to Øksnehallen

Halmtorvet (English: The Haymarket) is a public square in the Vesterbro district of Copenhagen, Denmark. It is located next to Copenhagen Central Station in front of the Meat District. The oblong square eventually turns into Sønder Boulevard, a broad street with a park strip in its central reserve, which continues to Enghavevej at Enghave station.

== History ==
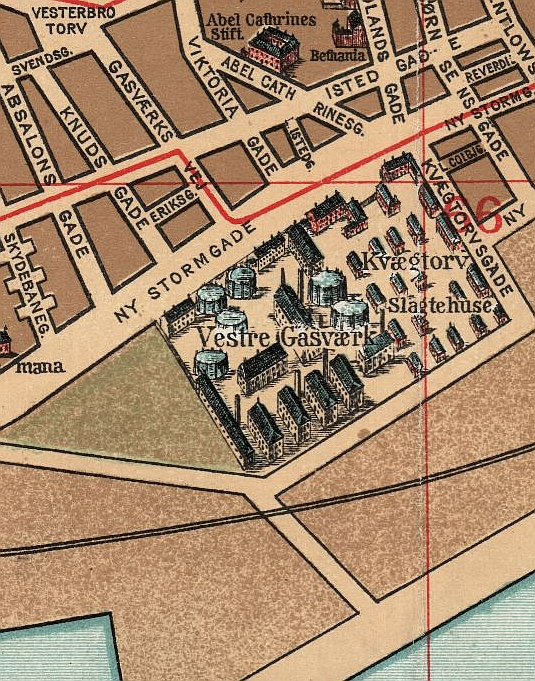
Galmtorvet - when it was still called Ny Stormgade - seen on a map detail from the 1890s

Copenhagen's haymarket was originally located just inside the Western City Gate where the City Hall Square lies today. It closed on 1 January 1888 and relocated to the area outside the new Livestock Market which had opened at the site in 1879. Market days were Wednesday and Saturday and up to several hundred loads of hay and straw were traded and distributed to cattle and horse stables around the city.

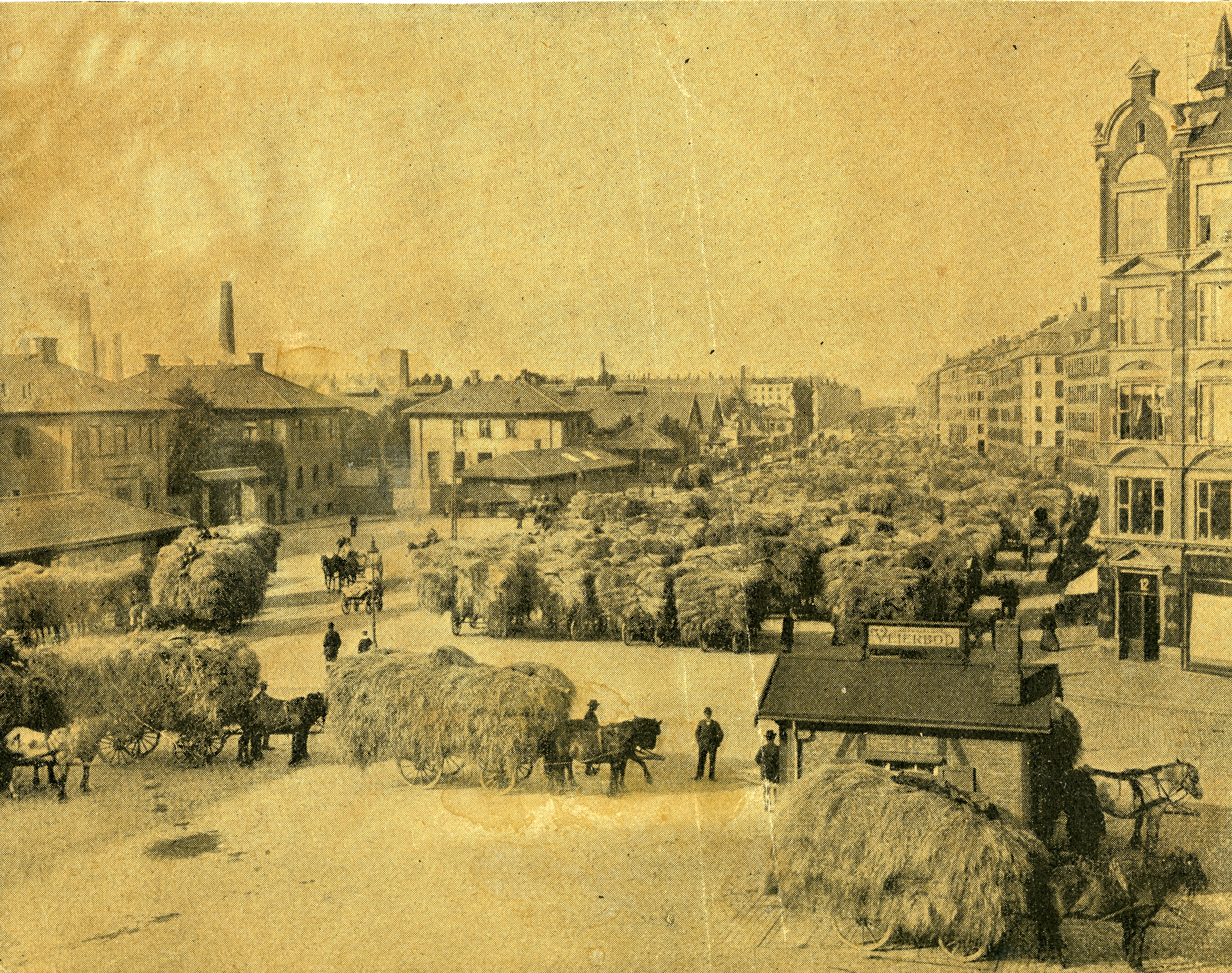
Halmtorvet, c. 1900.

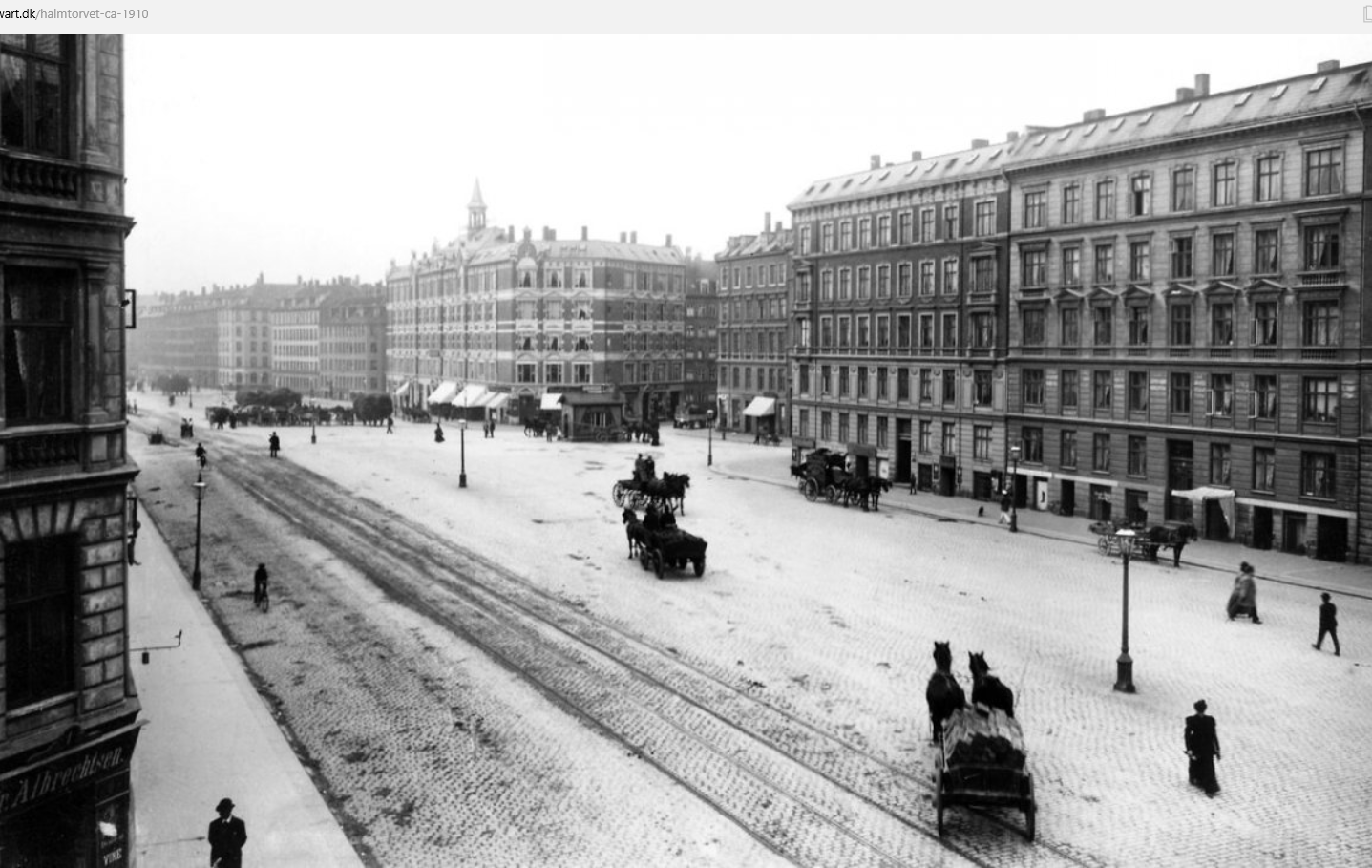
Halmtorvet, c. 1910

Up through the 20th century, with improved infrastructure, livestock moved out of the city and horses lost their role in transportation, and the haymarket finally closed. The area fell into despair and became associated with prostitution and drug dealing. The site was also dominated by through traffic, buses and goods transport.

The area underwent gradual gentrification up through the 1990s and Halmtorvet was thoroughly refurbished from 1999 to 2003 as part of a major programme for urban renewal in the Vesterbro area. The first stage was designed by the office of the City Architect and completed in 2000. The second and third stages were designed by the Park Office of the city and carried out in 2003. In order to obtain a coherent space in the area a large gas regulator in front of the Brown Meat District was removed.

== Square layout ==
The square has an oblong shape. To make the space more attractive to urban life, the new layout introduced one-way traffic which is taken along a single lane on the south side of the square. A roundabout on the corner of the Brown Meat District, distributes traffic south and north of the Central Station.

In the centre of the square, in front of Øksnehallen, there is an oval pool surrounded by large open spaces and playgrounds. Other areas have elevated lawns and flower beds with terraced sides. Other elements in the refurbishment include new paving and items of street furniture.

== Buildings ==
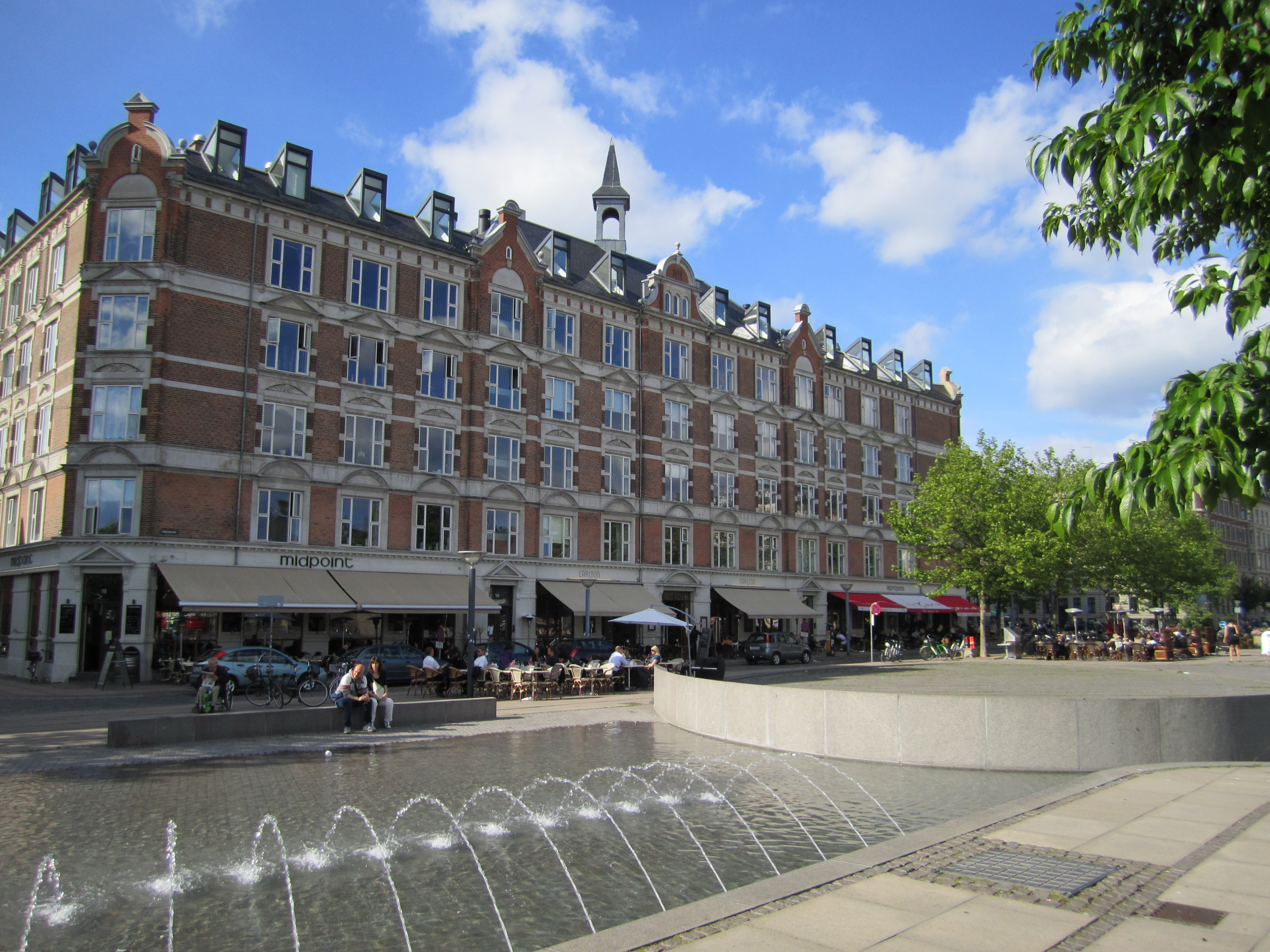
Emil Blichfeldt's building from 1898

The north side of the square is lined with residential buildings from the 1890s. The building between Lille Istedgade and Abel Cathrine Gade was built from 1897 to 1898 to the design of Emil Blichfeldt who has also designed the main entrance of Tivoli Gardens on the other side of the Central Station.

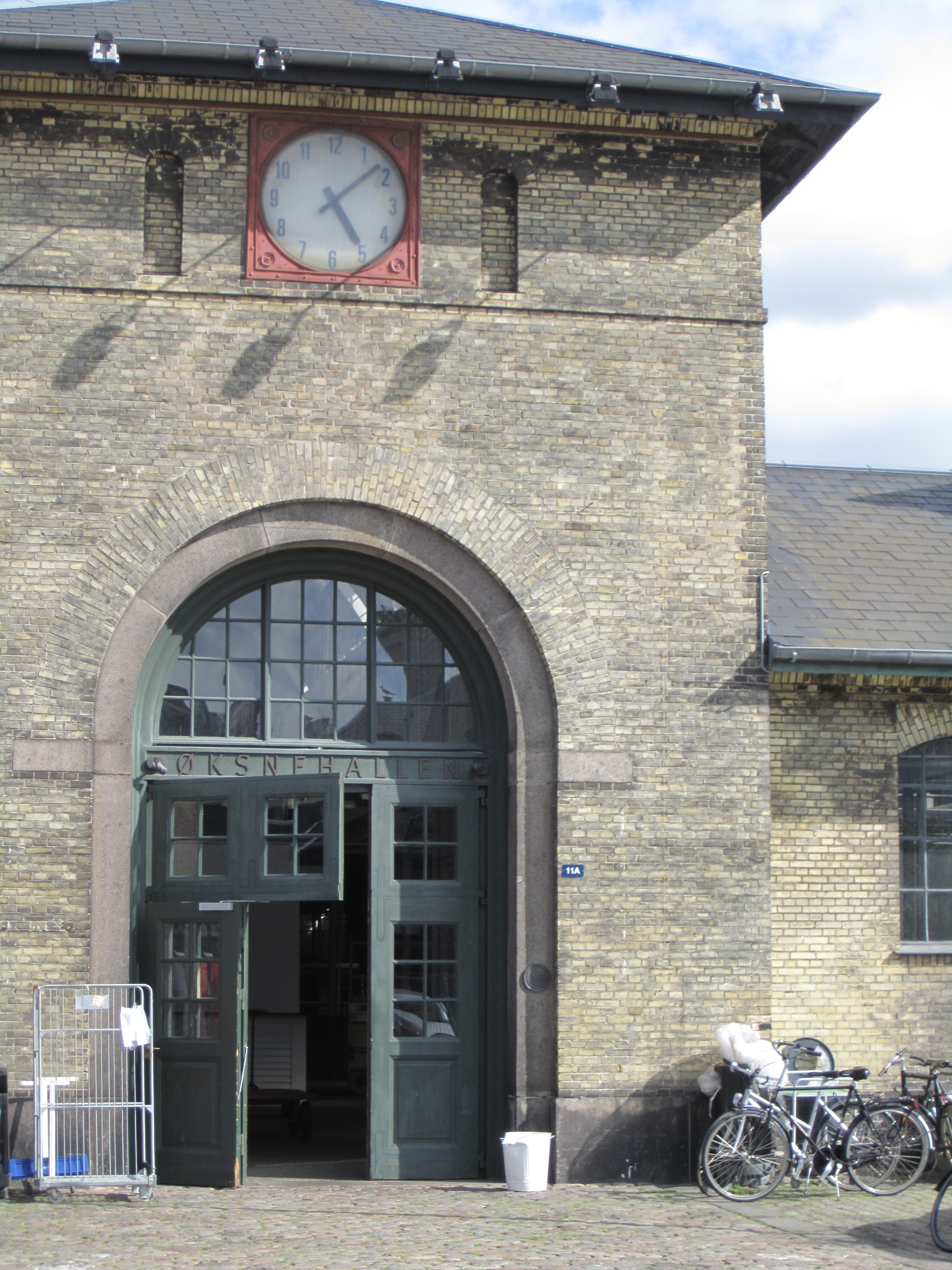
No 11: The main entrance to Øksnehallen

Built in 1961, Borgenhus, at No. 20, is the only building in Inner Vesterbro under City Plan West, a municipal plan from 1958 for condemnations and urban renewal in the area.

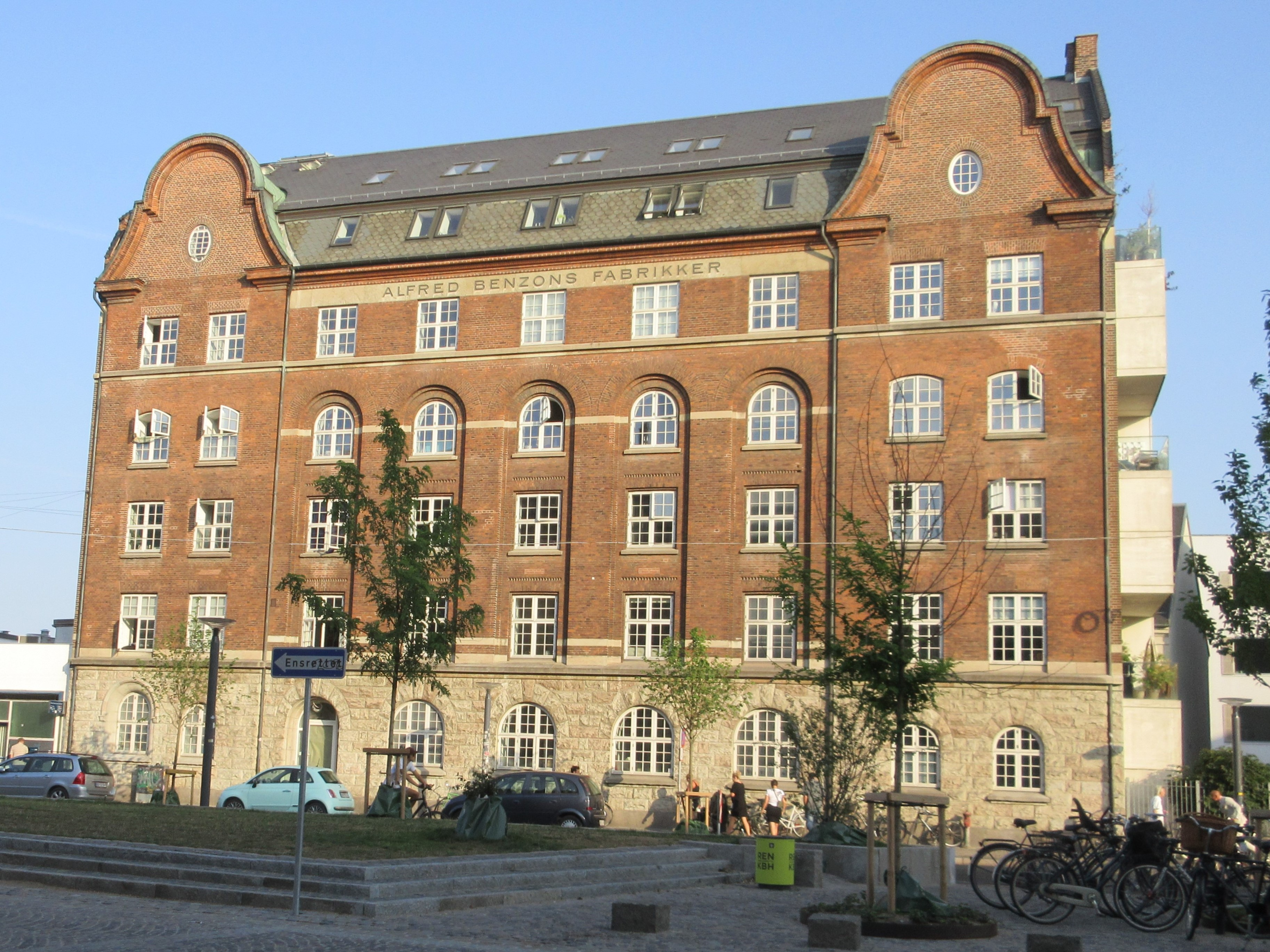
Alfred Benzons Fabrikker

The south side of the square, from the roundabout up to the beginning of Sønder Boulevard, borders on the Meat Packing District. The original meat market was planned and designed by Hans Jørgen Holm in 1878 but over the years new buildings were added to the design of other architects, including Øksnehallen by Ludvig Fenger in 1901.

The section closest to the Central Station is known as the Brown Meat District. It is the older part and generally dates from about 1900. The section closest to Sønder Boulevard is known as the White Meat District and was built in the first half of the 1930s to the design of City Architect Poul Holsøe. Halmtorvet 29 is the former headquarters of Alfred Benzon A/S.

== Halmtorvet today ==
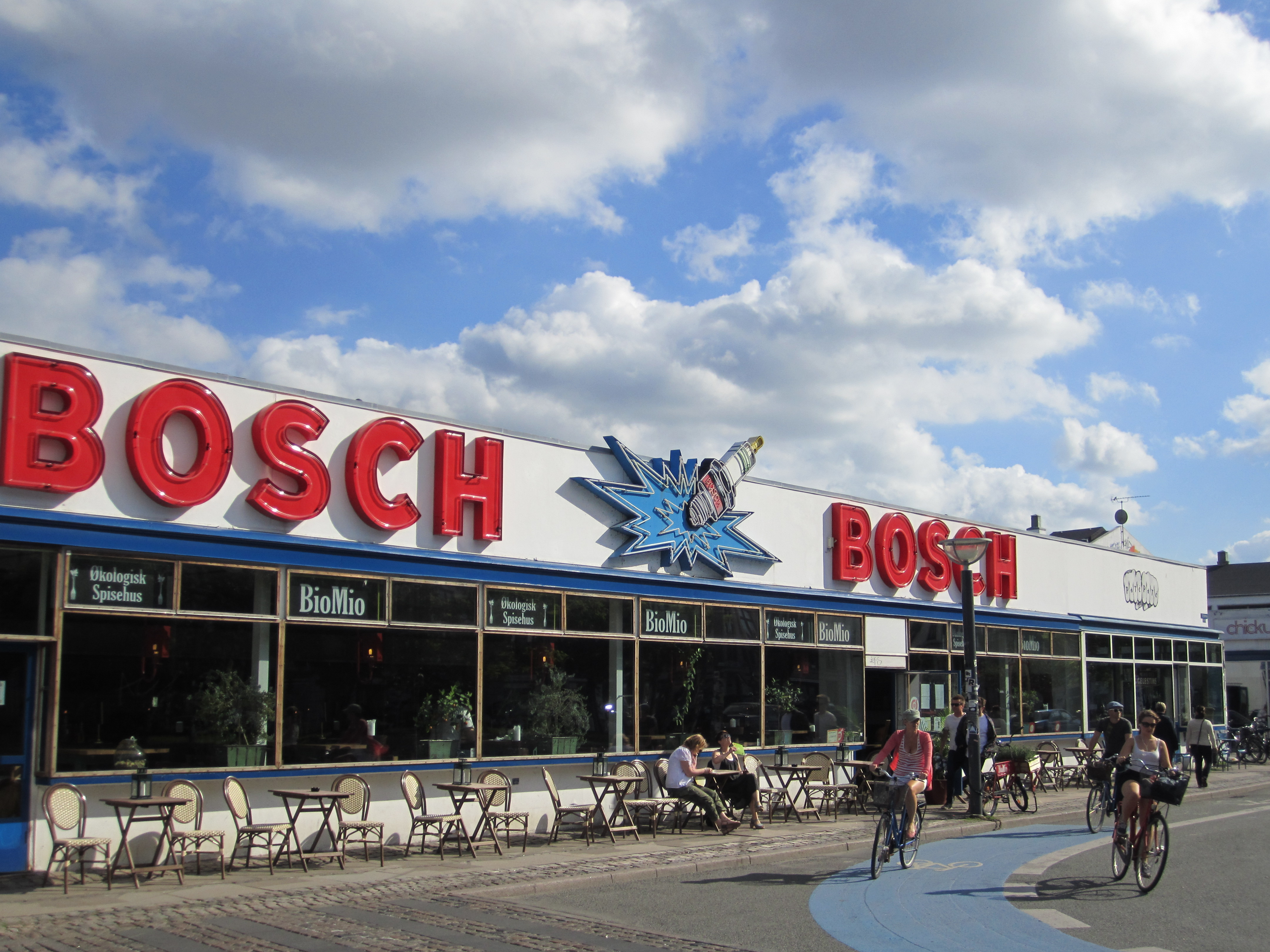
Restaurant in the White Meat District

Halmtorvet is now lined on either side by cafés and restaurants. Part of the Brown Meat District, Øksnehallen at No. 11, a former market building, now serves as an exhibition venue which houses a broad variety of events, exhibitions and flea markets. Husets Teater is a small studio theatre based in another building of the Brown Meat District.

Borgenhus, the modern building at No. 20, houses Station City, the Copenhagen Police Department's police station for the city centre.

== See also ==
- Tietgensgade
