= Karriere Bar =

Bar and restaurant in Copenhagen, Denmark

Coordinates: 55.6677°N 12.5610°E

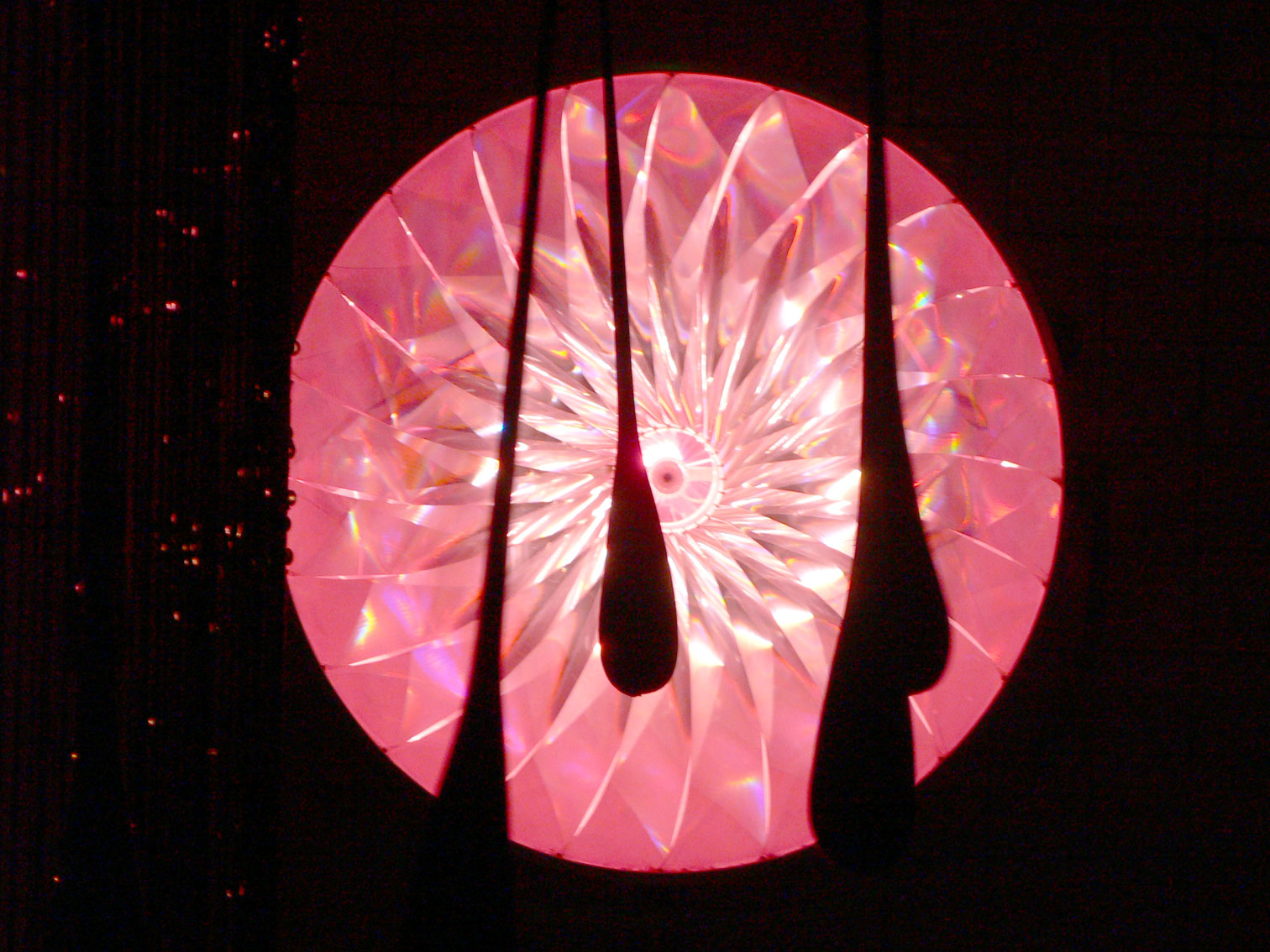
Olafur Eliasson's National Career Lamp at one end of the bar

Karriere Bar was a bar and restaurant in the Meatpacking District of Copenhagen, Denmark, co-founded by Berlin-based, Danish artist Jeppe Hein in 2007. The establishment featured interactive and Site-specific art by a range of international artists. It opened in 2007 as one of the first new places to open in the Meatpacking District. The artworks are integrated into the design of the restaurant, involving a concept for the menu, the lamp (Eliasson), the moving bar (Hein), a concept for live transmission of the conversation at one of the tables (Cardiff/Miller), the toilets [AVPD] and many other components of the restaurant environment.

== Represented artists ==
Franz Ackermann, Kristoffer Akselbo, AVPD, Kenneth Balfelt, Bank & Rau, Massimo Bartolini, Monica Bonvicini, Janet Cardiff/George Bures Miller, Maurizio Cattelan, Gardar Eide Einarsson, Olafur Eliasson, Michael Elmgreen & Ingar Dragset, Ceal Floyer, FOS, Alicia Framis, David Garcia, Dan Graham, Tue Greenfort, Douglas Gordon, Carl Michael von Hausswolff, Jeppe Hein, Carsten Höller, Jesper Just, Ernesto Neto, Dan Peterman, Tino Sehgal, Tomás Saraceno, Claude El Skorrari, Robert Stadler, Simon Starling, Rirkrit Tiravanija, and Johannes Wohnseifer.

== See also ==
- Meatpacking District, Copenhagen
- Site-specific art
