= Emil Blichfeldt =

Danish architect

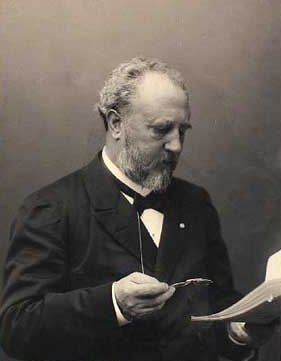
- Portrait of Emil Blichfeldt.
- Born: 5 November 1849; Copenhagen, Denmark
- Died: 20 October 1908 (aged 58); Copenhagen, Denmark
- Occupation: architect
- Known for: Influential in home designs in Denmark at the beginning of the 20th century

Signature
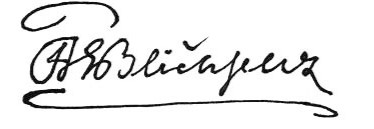

Emil Blichfeldt (5 November 1849 – 20 October 1908) was a Danish architect who worked in the Historicist style.

== Biography ==
Frederik Thorvald Emil Blichfeldt was born in Copenhagen, the son of billard table manufacturer Jens Christian Frederik Blichfeldt and Marie Sophie Nielsen. He studied at the Royal Danish Academy of Fine Arts from 1864 to 1871 while at the same time working as an assistant for Ferdinand Meldahl. He won the Academy's small gold medal in 1876 and the large gold medal in 1878 with a project for a national museum. Blichtfeldt won the academy's travel scholarships in 1878, 1879, 1880 and 1881 and was on a multi-year stay in Italy until spring 1882. His first assignment was under the supervision of Meldahl to plan and oversee the construction of a housing fringe surrounding the Marble Church in Copenhagen. He exhibited drawings at Charlottenborg Spring Exhibition 1874 and 1878, at Nordic Exhibition of 1888 in Copenhagen.

Blichfeldt was married in 1908 with Sidse Dorthea Sophie Caroline Saabye (1872-1935). He was the Knight of the Order of the Dannebrog. He died at 59 years of age in Copenhagen and was buried at Bispebjerg Cemetery.

== Selected works ==
- Frederiksgade Housing fringe, Frederiksstaden, Copenhagen (1876–94)
- 73-77 Bredgade/18 Esplanaden, Copenhagen (1884–86)
- Main entrance, Tivoli Gardens, Copenhagen (1889–90)
- Great Northern Telegraph Company, Kongens Nytorv, Copenhagen (1890–94)
- Messen Department Store, Købmagergade, Copenhagen (1895)
- 12-16 Halmtorvet, Copenhagen (1897–98)

== Image gallery ==
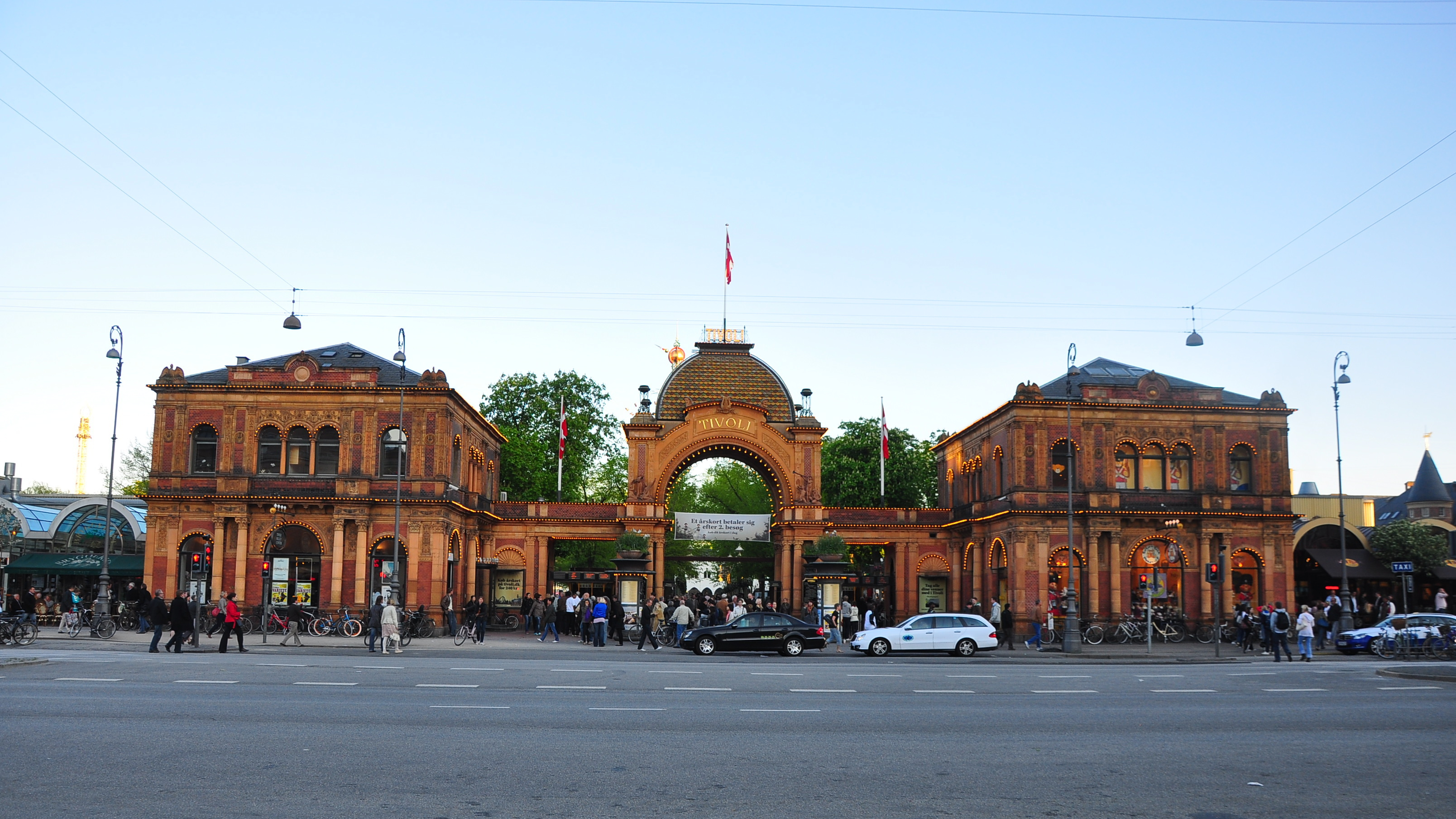
Main entrance, Tivoli Gardens (1889–90)

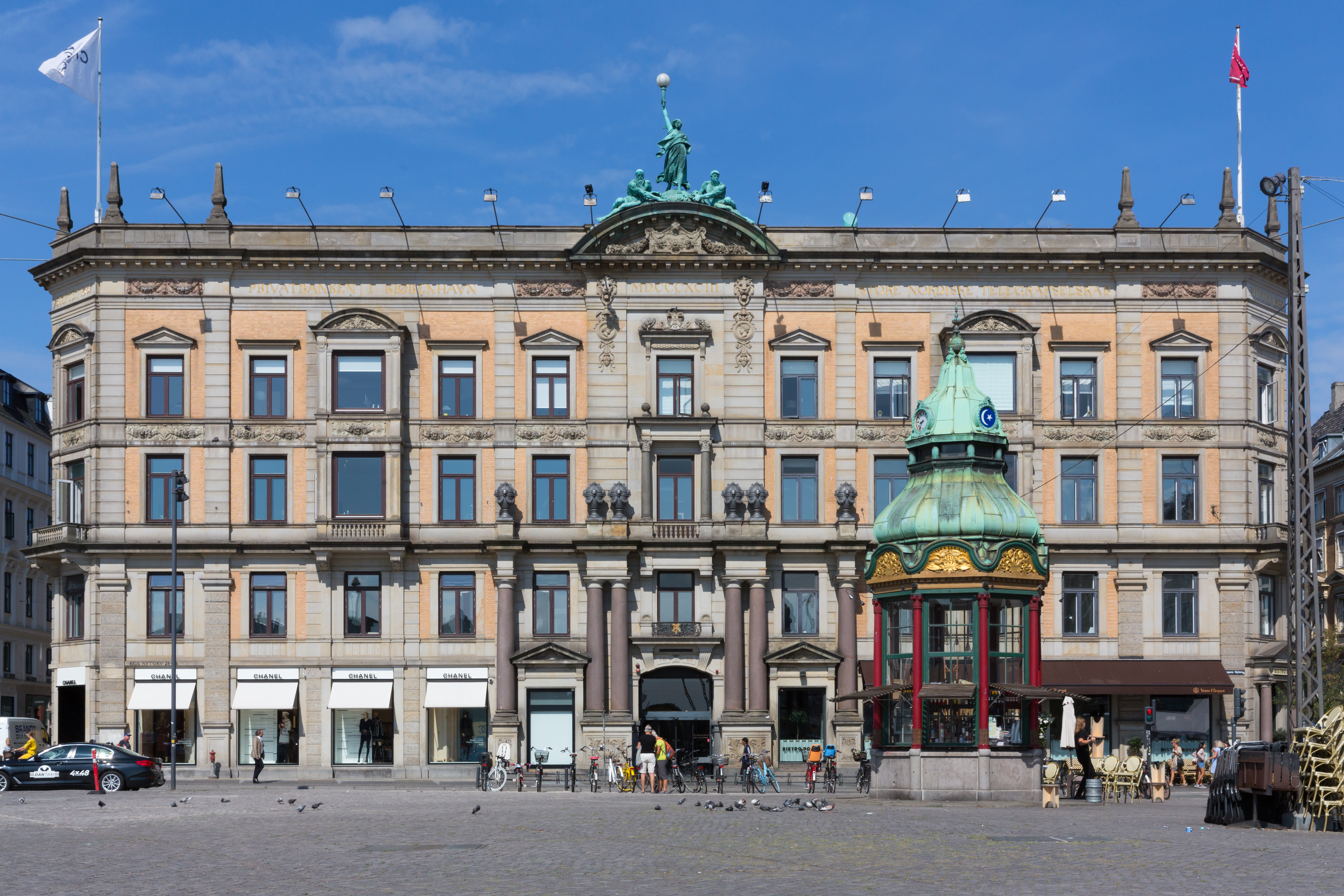
Great Northern Telegraph Company (1890–94)

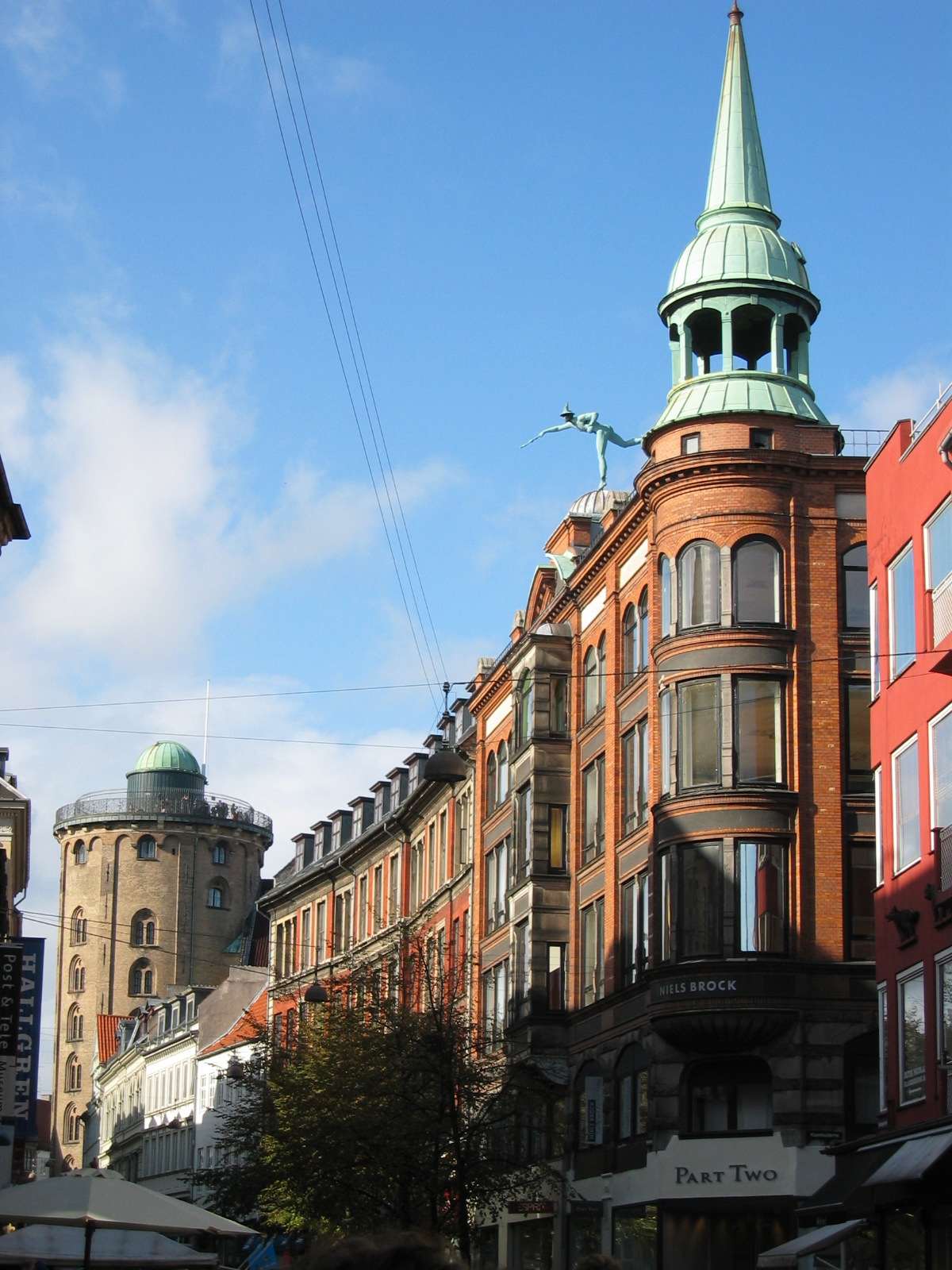
Messen Department Store (1895)

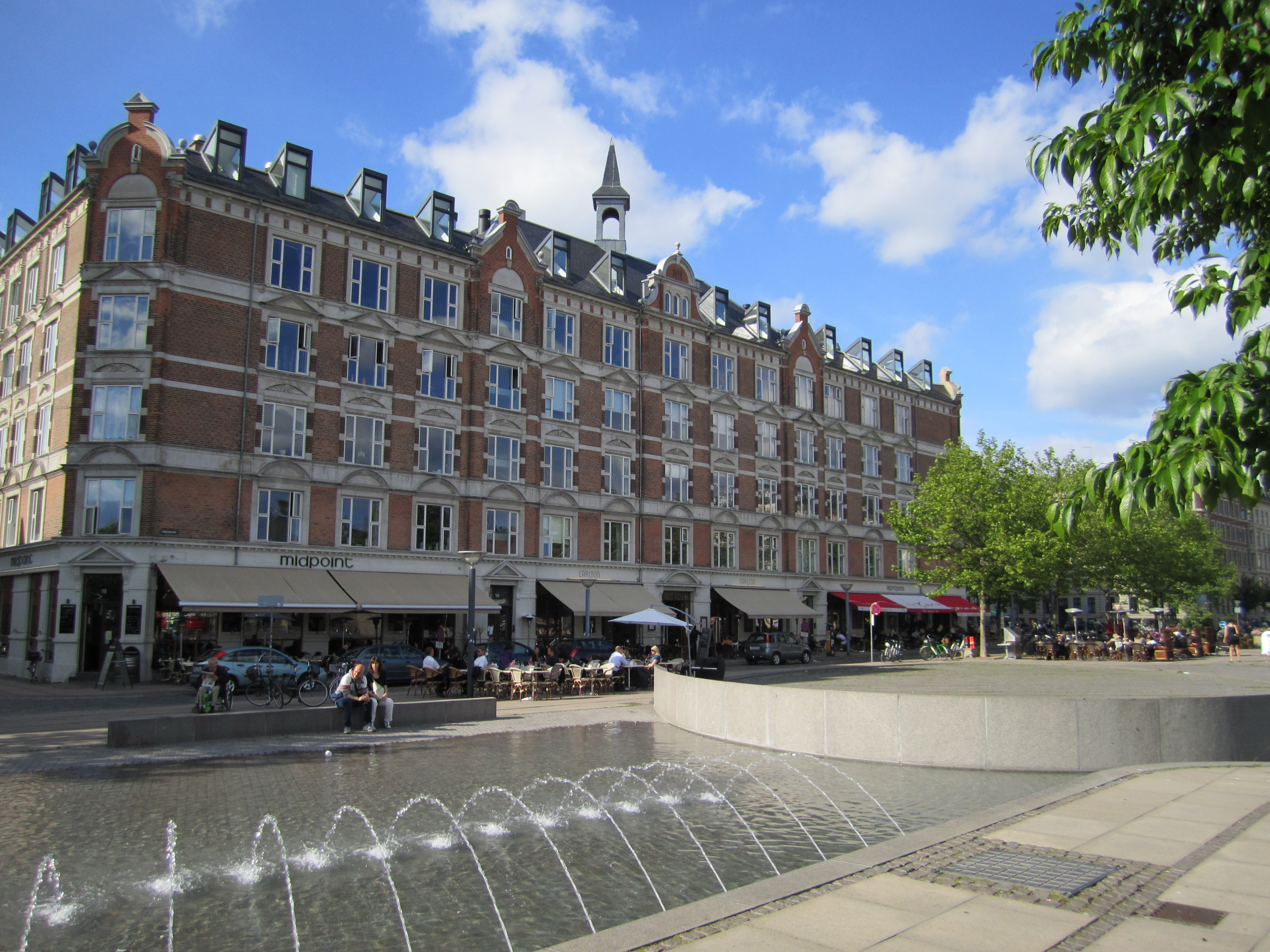
12-16 Halmtorvet (1897–98)
