= Øksnehallen =

Building in Copenhagen, Denmark

Coordinates: 55.6694°N 12.5623°E

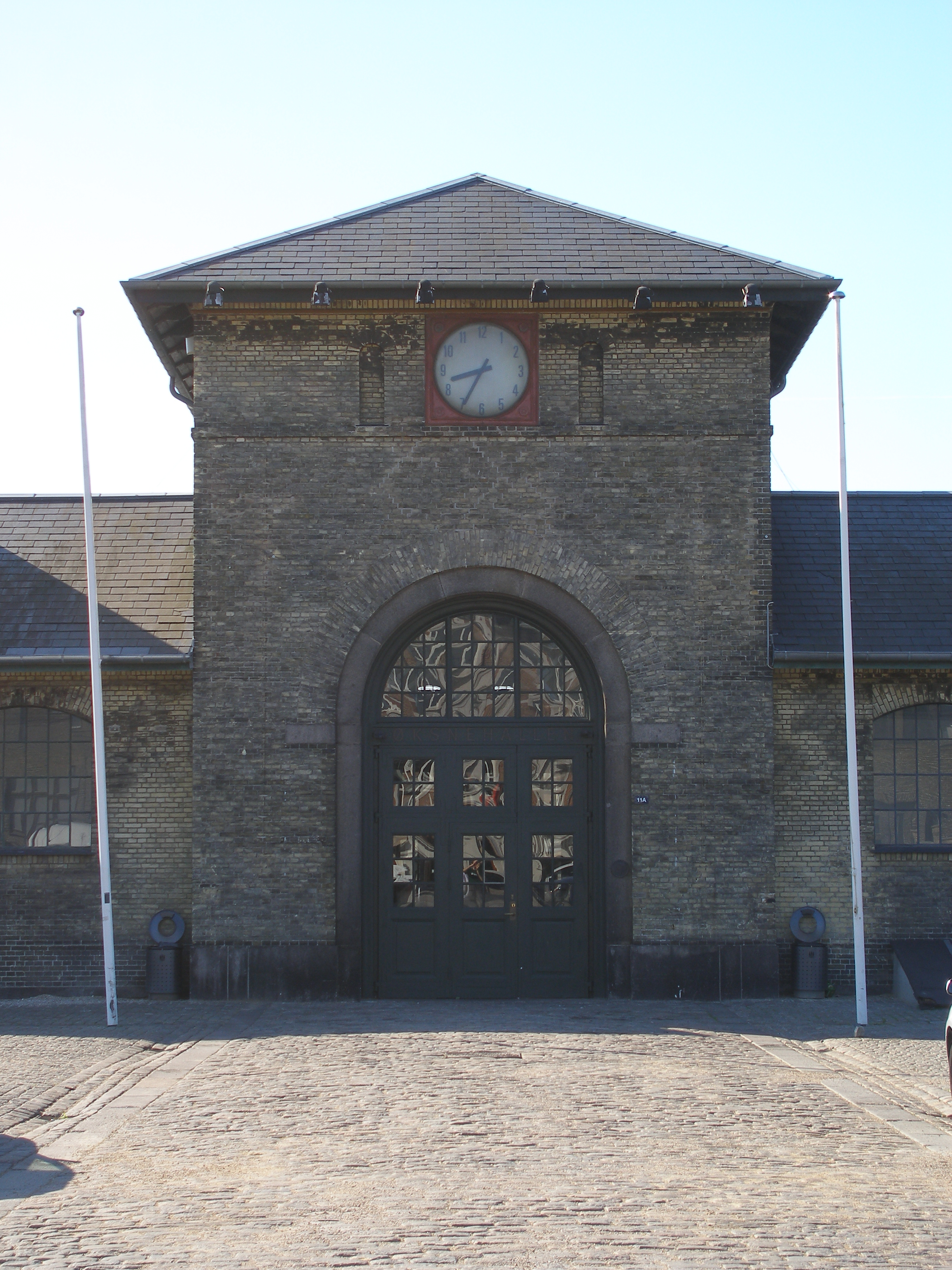
Entrance to Øksnehallen

Øksnehallen is an exhibition space located on Halmtorvet in the Vesterbro district of Copenhagen, Denmark. The building is a former market hall, part of the Brown Meat District.

== History ==
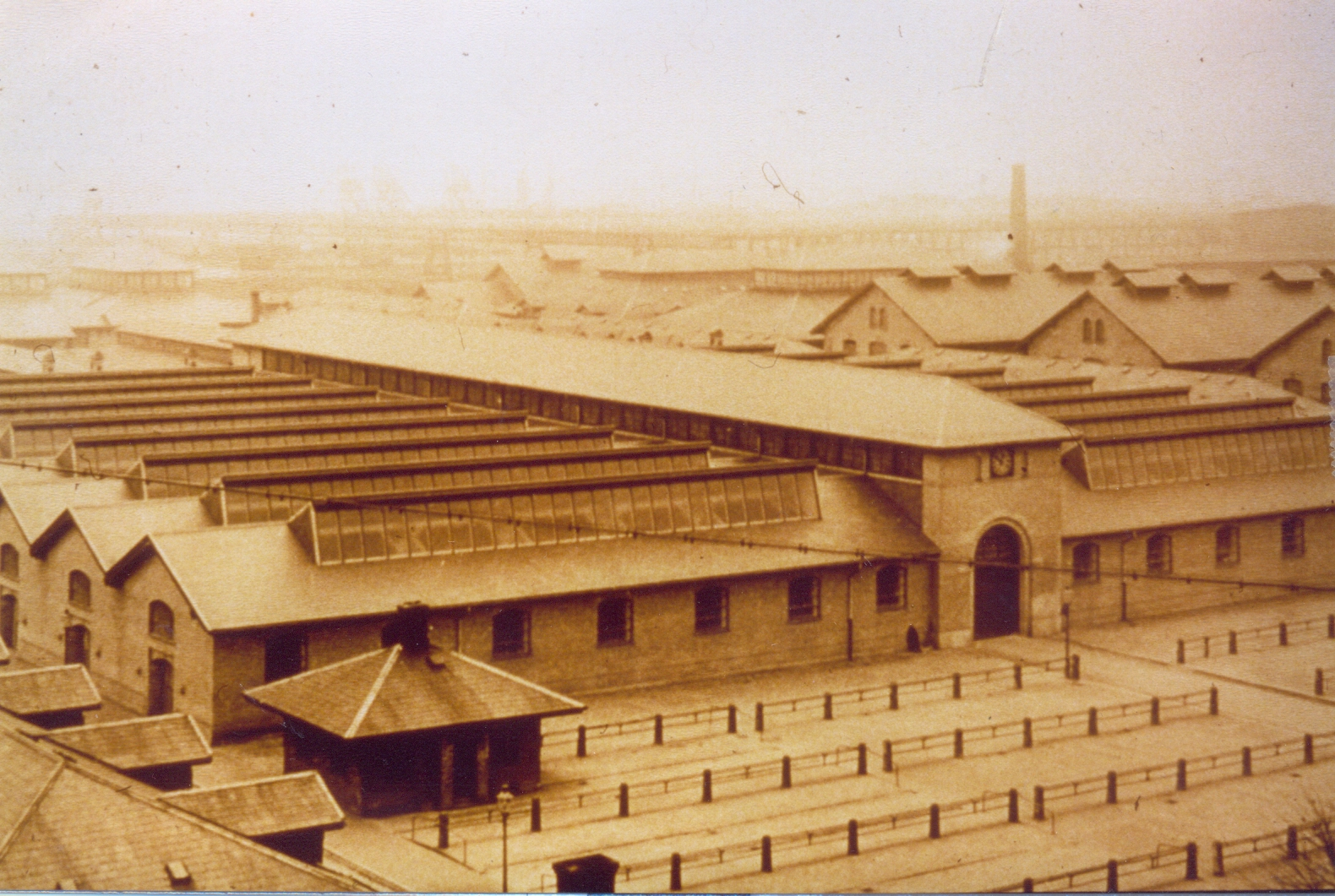
Drawing of the building in the 19th century.

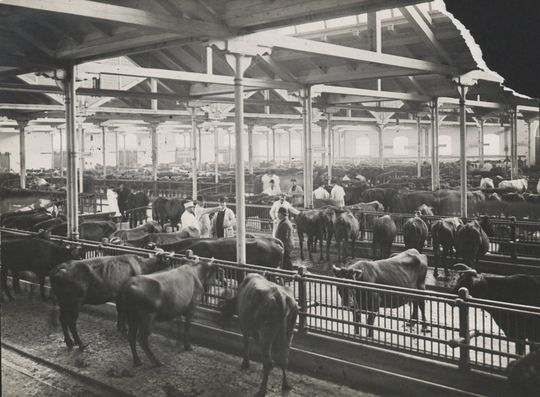
Øksnehallen in the 1910s

The Cattle Market opened on 28 November 1879. Øksnehallen was built in 1891 to a design by city architect Ludvig Fenger. It housed dealers' offices and had a capacity for 1600 head of cattle. The market hall remained in use until the White Meat Market was inaugurated in the 1959s.

Øksnehallen was converted into an exhibition space in connection with Copenhagen's status as European Capital of Culture in 1996. It has been operated by DGI-byen since September 2005.

== Current use ==
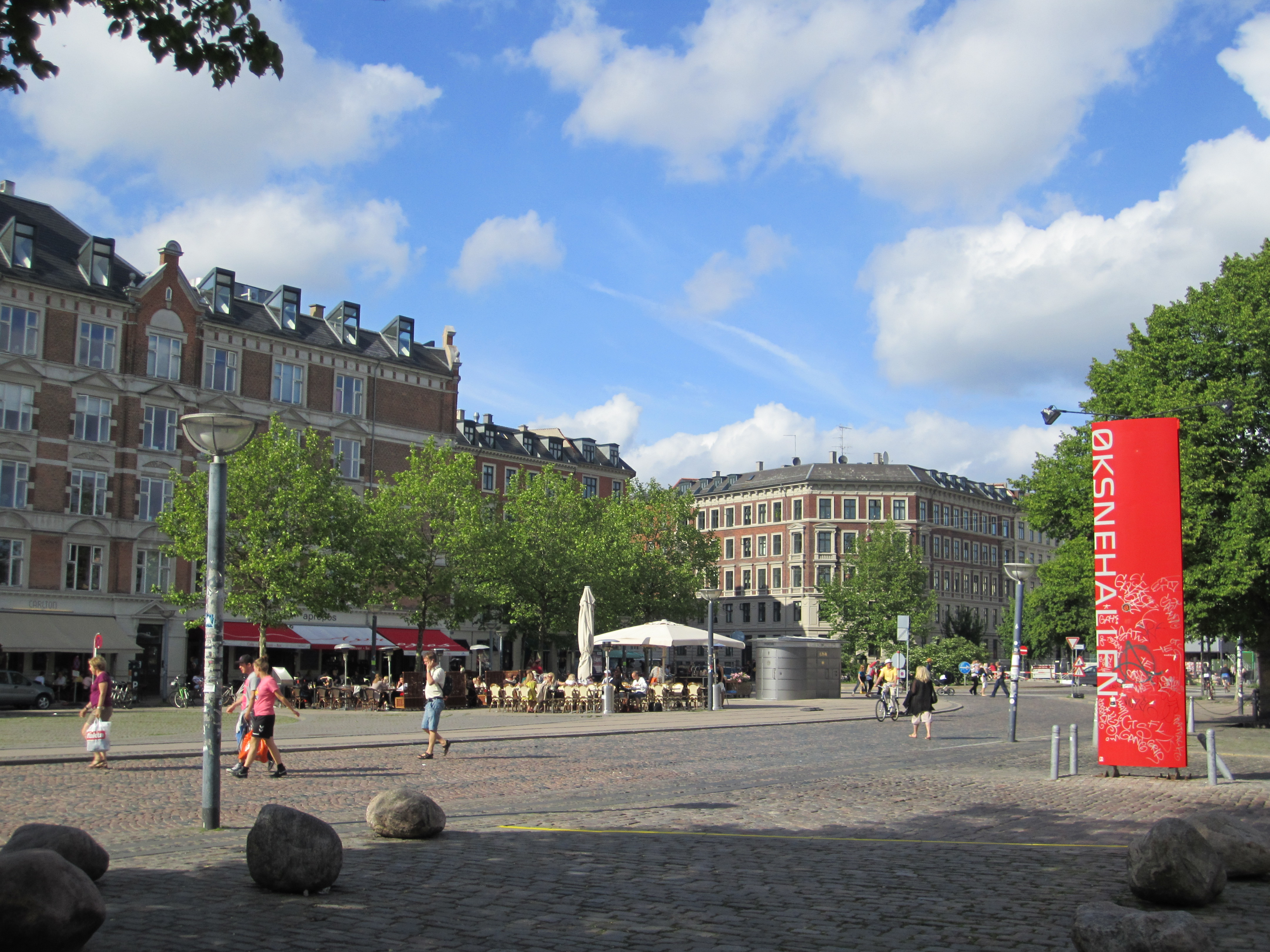
Øksnehallen's main entranceon Halmtorvet

Øksnehallen is used for a wide array of events, including art exhibitions, flea markets, conferences and fashion shows. It houses the VISION event during Copenhagen Fashion Week.
