= DGI-byen =

Multipurpose building in Denmark

Coordinates: 55°40′11″N 12°33′52″E

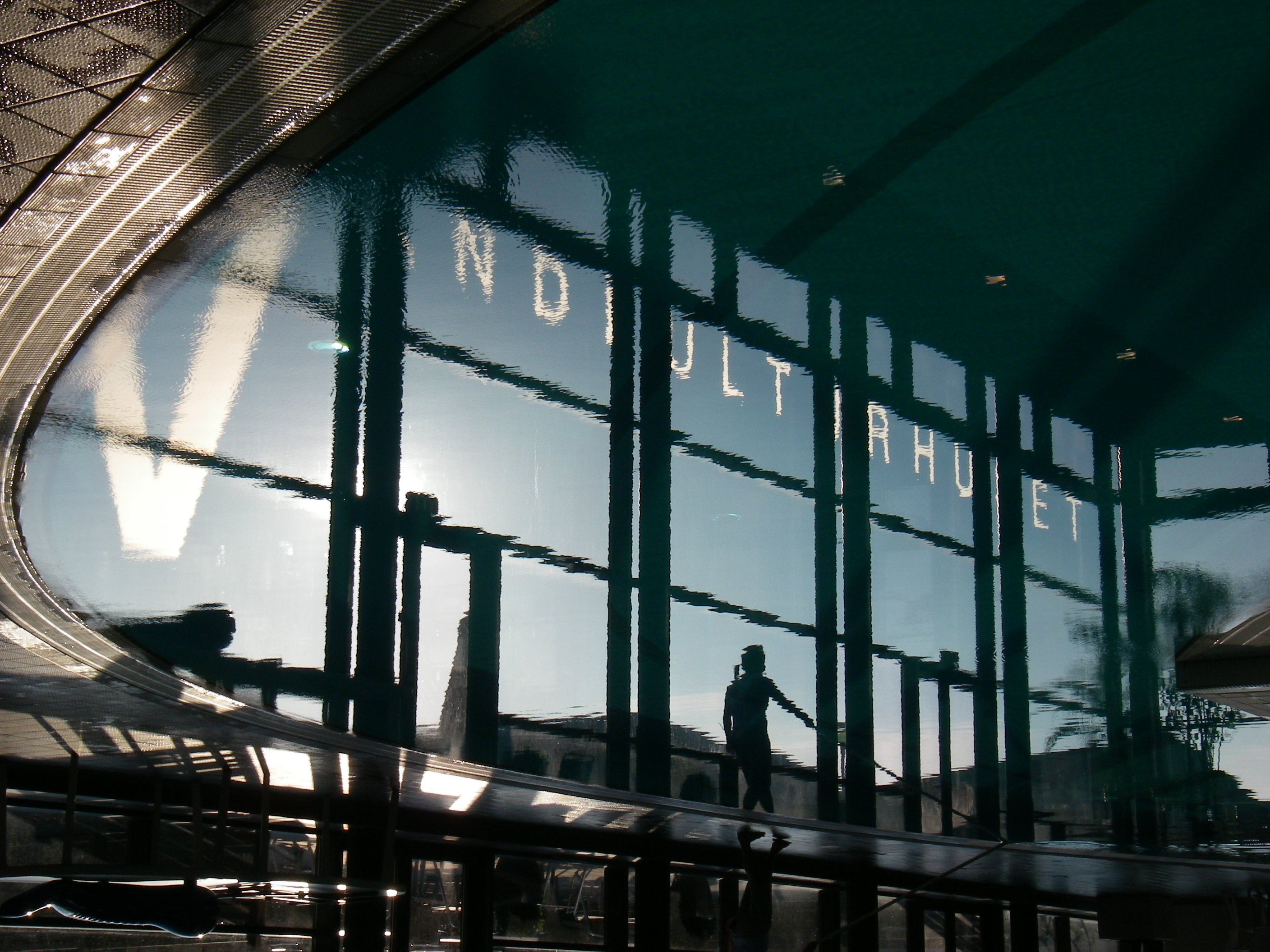
Vandkulturhuset at sunset. "Vandkulturhuset" is Danish for "Water Culture House".

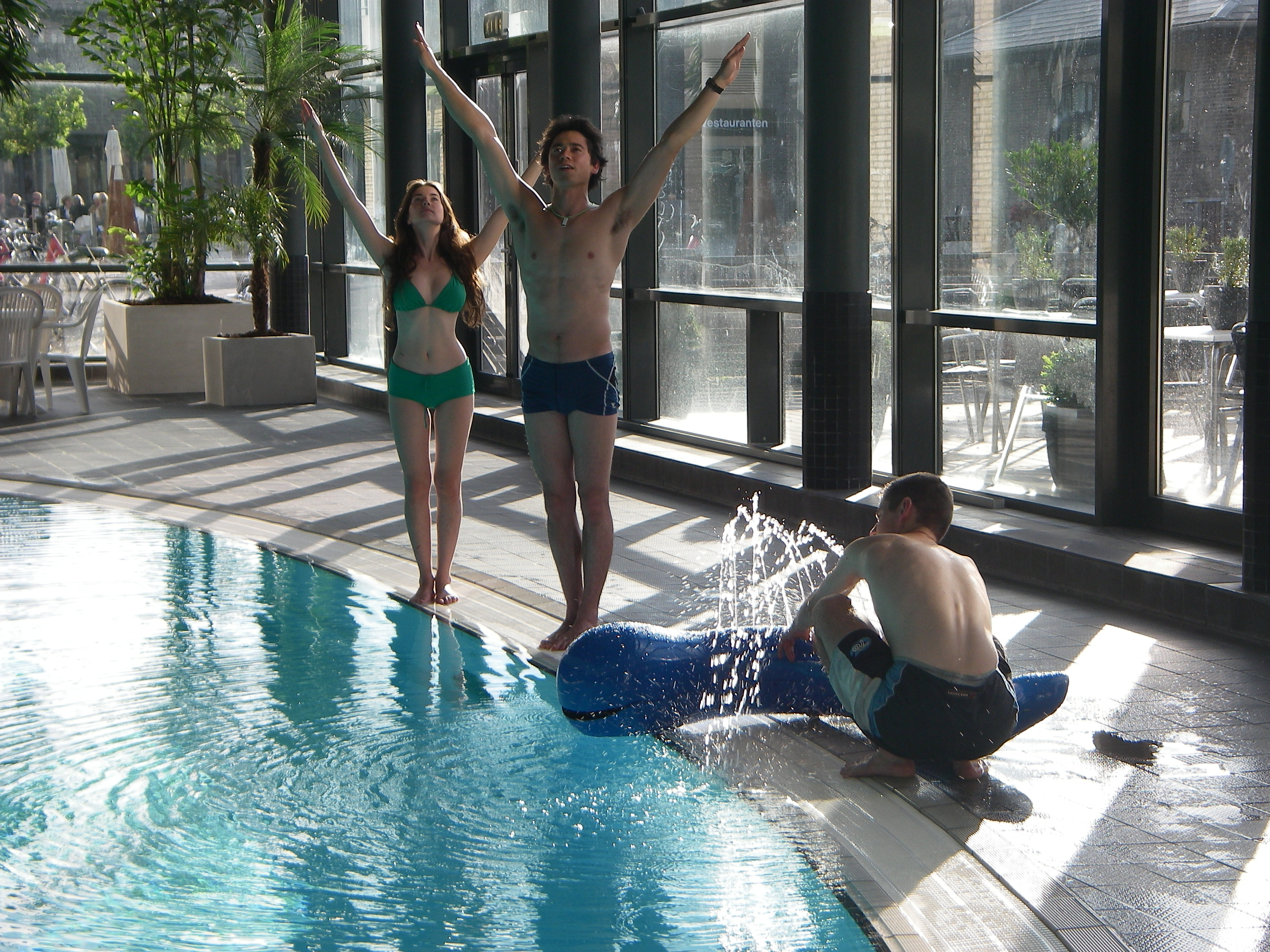
Hydraulophone performance at DGI-byen pool.

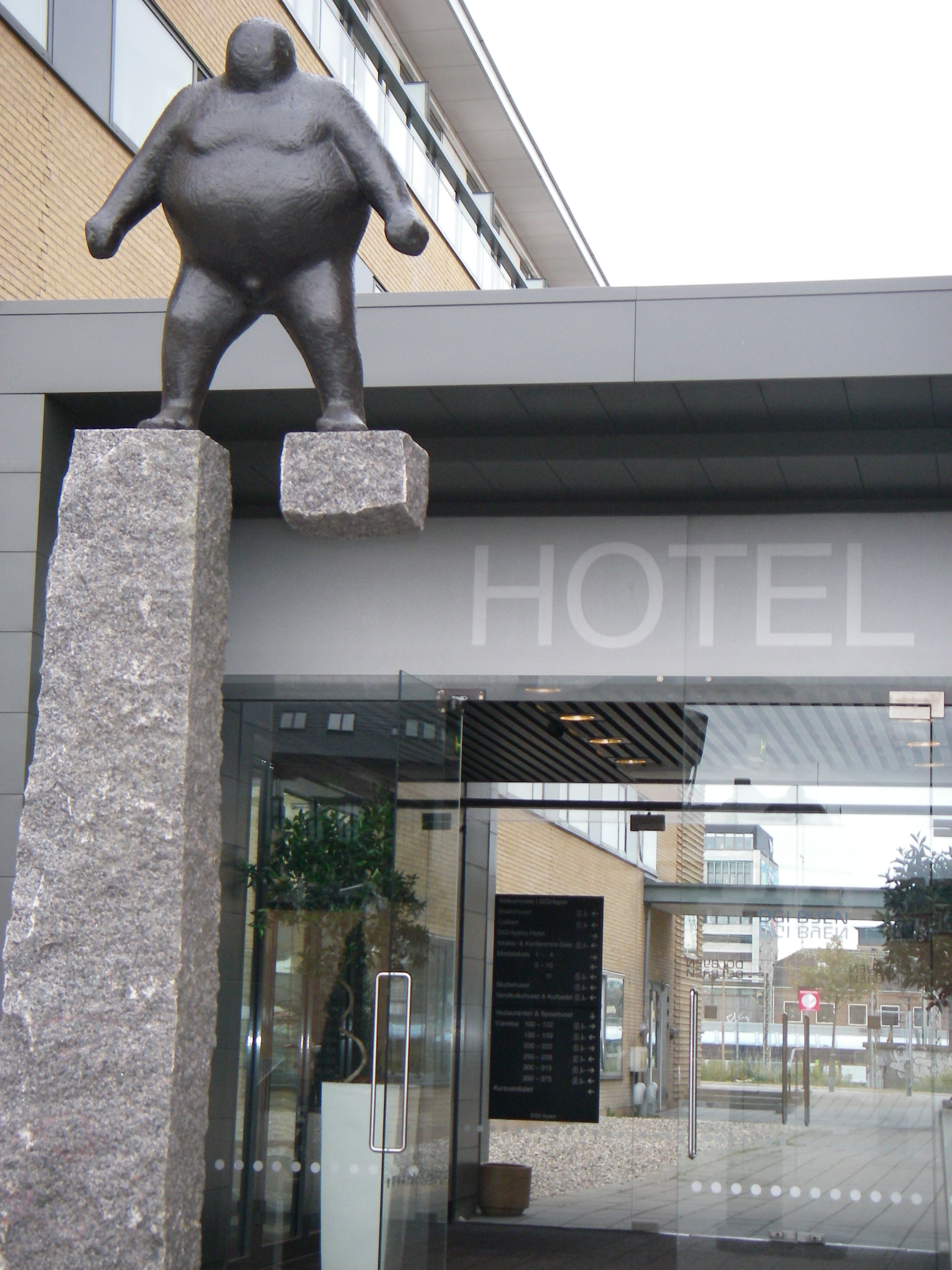
Main entrance to DGI-byen Hotel.

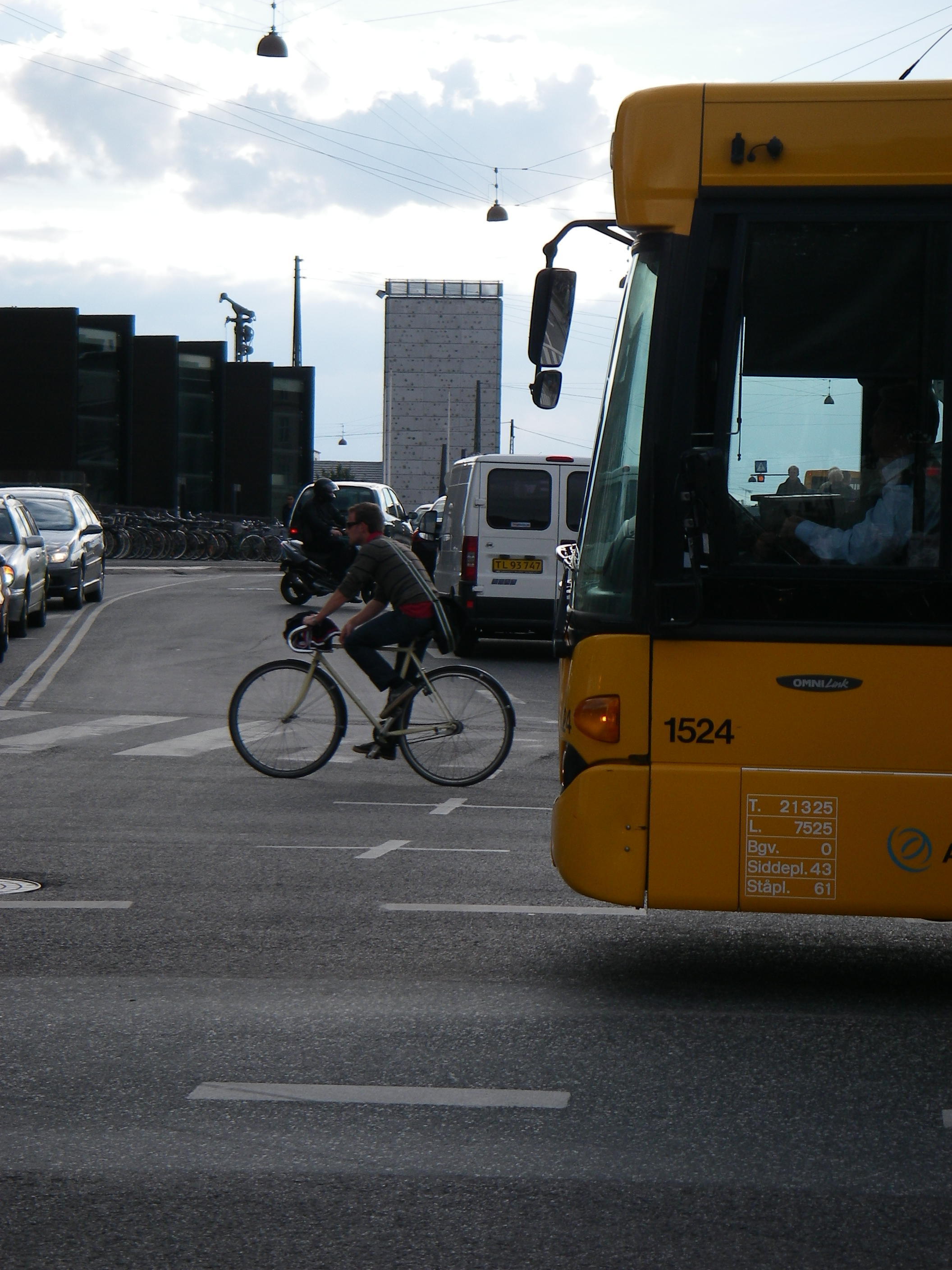
DGI-byen city landmark: a large outdoor climbing gym/wall is visible from far across the city.

DGI-byen is a facility that houses various spa facilities, restaurants, hotels, conference facilities, a bowling alley, flexible multi-centres, sports clubs, a superellipse shaped swimming pool and Vandkulturhuset, (Danish for "Water Culture House"), located in central Copenhagen, Denmark.

DGI-byen is situated within the Meat District (Kødbyen), a historical industrial area that was transformed into a recreation area for cultural and leisure activities from 1993. However, most of DGI-byen consists of new buildings, in contrast to the rest of the Meat District. One exception is Øksnehallen, formerly a stable for 1,600 cattle, now an exhibition and events venue.

First parts of the complex were opened in 1999. It is named after Danske Gymnastik- og Idrætsforeninger ("Danish Gymnastics and Sports Associations"), the main umbrella organisation of 5,000 local sports associations in Denmark with 1,3 million members. The second part of the name is by, Danish for "town" or "city", hinting that the facilities are extensive enough to operate as a mini city within Copenhagen.

The main building is a 22,000 square metre facility situated directly behind Copenhagen Central Station. A walled-off portion provides infrastructure for DGI-byen's numerous cultural activities and events. DGI-byen is a rapidly expanding area of the city, with ongoing construction. DGI-byen hosts a variety of banquets, concerts, etc. One recognizable landmark seen from the Central Station is a giant outdoor climbing gym wall. The recreational facilities are aimed at the common public, rather than a business or upscale segment.
