= Listed buildings in Vesterbro/Kongens Enghave =

This list of listed buildings in Vesterbro/Kongens Enghave comprises listed buildings and structures in the Vesterbro/Kongens Enghave district of Copenhagen, Denmark.

== List ==
Listing name	Image	Location	Coordinates	Description
Abel Cathrines Stiftelse		Abel Cathrines Gade 13, 1654 København V	55°40′17.99″N 12°33′32.14″E	Four-winged residential complex from 1886 designed by Hermann Baagøe Storck
Carlsberg		Gamle Carlsberg Vej 13, 1799 København V		Carlsberg Academy: J.C. Jacobsen's former home from 1853-54 by Niels Sigfred Nebelong (Ref
Carlsberg		Gamle Carlsberg Vej 6, 1799 København V	1951	Carlsberg Laboratory (Ref)
Carlsberg		Gamle Carlsberg Vej 10, 1799 København V	1951	Carlsberg Laboratory (Ref)
Carlsberg		Gamle Carlsberg Vej 11, 1799 København V	1951	Kørehal med lagerkældre: Building from 1857 (Ref)
Carlsberg		Gamle Carlsberg Vej 11, 1799 København V	1951	Kørehal med lagerkældre: Building from 1878 (Ref)
Carlsberg		Gamle Carlsberg Vej 15, 1799 København V	1951	Winter garden (Ref)
Carlsberg		Gamle Carlsberg Vej 15, 1799 København V	1951	Two chinbeys from 1768 (Ref)
Carlsberg		Bryggerhesten 1, 1799 København V	1951	Garages (Ref)
Carlsberg		Bryggerhesten 1, 1799 København V	1951	Garages (Ref)
Carlsberg		Ny Carlsberg Vej 101, bygning 60, 1799 København V		Old Maltery: Maltery originally from 1856 but burnt and rebuilt in 1867 by Niels Sigfred Nebelong (Ref)
Carlsberg		Ny Carlsberg Vej 101, 1799 København V		Dipylon: Gateway/skyway from 1892 by Vilhelm Dahlerup (Ref)
Carlsberg		Bag Elefanterne 12, 1799 København V	1951	Elephant Gate: Combined gateway and water tower from 1901 by Vilhelm Dahlerup (Ref)
Carlsberg		Bag Elefanterne 1, 1799 København V	1951	Carlsberg Brewhouse from 1901 by Vilhelm Klein (Ref)
Carlsberg		Bag Elefanterne 1, 1799 København V	1951	The Grey House: Building originally from 1873 but adapted and expanded by Hack Kampmann in 1901 (Ref)
Carlsberg		Bag Elefanterne 1, 1799 København V	1951	Carlsberg Brewhouse from 1901 by Vilhelm Klein (Ref)
Carlsberg		Ny Carlsberg Vej 105, 1799 København V	55°40′20.83″N 12°33′10.95″E	Carlsberg Museum: Former museum building created between 1882 and 1895 through a series of extensions by Vilhelm Dahlerup and Hack Kampmann (Ref)
Carlsberg		Valby Langgade 1, 1799 København V		Carl Jacobsen House: The house from by Hack Kampmann, including gate and the southern part of the garden
Carlsberg		Ny Carlsberg Vej 105, 1799 København V	1951	Gatehouse from 1886-87 by C. F. Thomsen
Carlsberg		Pasteursvej 3, 1799 København V	1951	Water tower from 1928 (Ref)
Carlsberg		Pasteursvej 4, 1799 København V	1951	Lagerkælder 3: (Ref)
Carlsberg		Pasteursvej 5, 1799 København V	1951	maskincentral (Ref)
Carlsberg		Pasteursvej 7, 1799 København V	1951	maskincentral (Ref)
Carlsberg		Pasteursvej 9, 1799 København V	1951	Two-storey extension from 1928 on the western end of the Boiler house (Ref)
Carlsberg		Pasteursvej 13, 1799 København V	1951	The Boiler House (Keddelhuset): Boiler house from 1926 by Carl Harild (Ref)
Carlsberg		Pasteursvej 15, 1799 København V	1951	Small extension on the north side of the Boiler House (Keddelhuset) (Ref)
Carlsberg		Pasteursvej 34, 1799 København V	1951	The Hanging Gardes: (Ref)
Carlsberg		Pasteursvej 16, 1799 København V	1951	Tap E: Former bottling facility from 1922 by Carl Harild (Ref)
Carlsberg		Vesterfælledvej 100 1799 København V	1951	Ny Carlsberg silos (Ref)
Carlsberg		Vesterfælledvej 100, 1799 København V	1951	Winding Chimney: from 1900 by Carl Jacobsen and Vilhelm Dahlerup (Ref)
Carlsberg Viaduct		Banevolden 0, 1799 København V		Viaduct from 1899 designed by engineer Kristen Møller for the Danish State Railways
Dansepavillon		Wagnersvej 19, 2450 København SV		
Copenhagen Central Station		Bernstorffsgade 20, 1577 København V	55°40′19.84″N 12°33′59.77″E	The main building from 1911 by Heinrich Wenck with Main Hall, vestibule and six covered platforms
Copenhagen Central Station		Bernstorffsgade 20, 1577 København V	55°40′19.84″N 12°33′59.77″E	The northern side wing along Bernstorffsgade from 1911 by Heinrich Wenck
Copenhagen Central Station		Bernstorffsgade 20, 1577 København V	55°40′19.84″N 12°33′59.77″E	The southern side wing along Bernstorffsgade by Heinrich Wenck
Copenhagen Central Station		Bernstorffsgade 20, 1577 København V	55°40′19.84″N 12°33′59.77″E	Three-storey office building extension to the south wing from 1922-25 by Heinrich Wenck
Den Brune Kødby		Halmtorvet 9A, 1700 København V	1911/1922	Meat market, various buildings dating from 1978 to 1901 and designed by Hans Jørgen Holm and Ludvig Fenger
Den Brune Kødby		Halmtorvet 9B, 1700 København V	1911/1922	Meat market, various buildings dating from 1978 to 1901 and designed by Hans Jørgen Holm and Ludvig Fenger
Den Brune Kødby		Halmtorvet 9D, 1700 København V	1911/1922	Meat market, various buildings dating from 1978 to 1901 and designed by Hans Jørgen Holm and Ludvig Fenger
Den Brune Kødby		Halmtorvet 9E, 1700 København V	1911/1922	Meat market, various buildings dating from 1978 to 1901 and designed by Hans Jørgen Holm and Ludvig Fenger
Den Brune Kødby		Halmtorvet 9G, 1700 København V	1911/1922	Meat market, various buildings dating from 1978 to 1901 and designed by Hans Jørgen Holm and Ludvig Fenger
Den Brune Kødby		Halmtorvet 9K, 1700 København V	1911/1922	Former stables for cattle
Den Brune Kødby		Halmtorvet 9K, 1700 København V	1911/1922	?
Den Brune Kødby		Halmtorvet 11, 1700 København V	1911/1922	Øksnehallen: Market hall by Ludvig Fenger
Den Brune Kødby		Halmtorvet 11, 1700 København V	1911/1922	Northeastern guardhouse in front of Øksnehallen
Den Brune Kødby		Halmtorvet 11, 1700 København V	1911/1922	Northeastern guardhouse in front of Øksnehallen
Den Brune Kødby		Halmtorvet 11A, 1700 København V	1911/1922	Meat market, various buildings dating from 1978 to 1901 and designed by Hans Jørgen Holm and Ludvig Fenger
Den Brune Kødby		Halmtorvet 11G, 1700 København V	1911/1922	Meat market, various buildings dating from 1978 to 1901 and designed by Hans Jørgen Holm and Ludvig Fenger
Den Brune Kødby		Onkel Dannys Plads 1, 1700 København V	1911/1922	Meat market, various buildings dating from 1978 to 1901 and designed by Hans Jørgen Holm and Ludvig Fenger
Den Brune Kødby		Onkel Dannys Plads 5, 1700 København V	1911/1922	Meat market, various buildings dating from 1978 to 1901 and designed by Hans Jørgen Holm and Ludvig Fenger
Den Brune Kødby		Onkel Dannys Plads 9, 1700 København V	1911/1922	Meat market, various buildings dating from 1978 to 1901 and designed by Hans Jørgen Holm and Ludvig Fenger
Den Hvide Kødby		Flæsketorvet 1, 1711 København	1911/1922	New Modernistic meat market built1931-34 to designs by city architect Poul Holsøe with collaborators
Den Hvide Kødby		Flæsketorvet 11, 1711 København V		
Den Hvide Kødby		Flæsketorvet 68, 1711 København V		
Den Hvide Kødby		Flæsketorvet 79, 1711 København V		
Den Hvide Kødby		Flæsketorvet 100, 1711 København V		
Den Hvide Kødby		Halmtorvet 27A, 1700 København V		
Den Hvide Kødby		Ingerslevsgade 48, 1705 København V		
Den Hvide Kødby		Ingerslevsgade 56, 1705 København V		
Den Hvide Kødby		Slagtehusgade 15, 1715 København V		
Den Hvide Kødby		Staldgade 78, 1699 København V		
Den Suhrske Stiftelse		Valdemarsgade 5, 1665 København V	55°40′17.63″N 12°32′55.27″E	The north wing of a three-winged complex of residential buildings from 1877 by Ludvig Fenger
Den Suhrske Stiftelse		Valdemarsgade 7, 1665 København V	55°40′17.35″N 12°32′56.7″E	The eastern and central wing of a three-winged complex of residential buildings from 1877 by Ludvig Fenger
Den Suhrske Stiftelse		Valdemarsgade 9, 1665 København V	55°40′16.83″N 12°32′55.39″E	The south wing of a three-winged complex of residential buildings from 1877 by Ludvig Fenger
Vega		Enghavevej 40, 1674 København V	55°40′4.79″N 12°32′39.29″E	Former assembly building of the Danish Labour Movement from 1956 designed by Vilhelm Lauritzen and now used as a music venue
Liberty Column		Vesterbrogade 0, 1620 København V	55°40′27.06″N 12°33′47.96″E	Memorial from 1797 designed by Nicolai Abildgaard with sculptural works by Johannes Wiedewelt, Nicolai Dajon and Andreas Weidenhaupt.
Løvenborg		Vesterbrogade 34, 1620 København V	55°40′21.34″N 12°33′23.21″E	Art Nouveau building from 1907 designed by Anthon Rosen
Løvenborg		Vesterbrogade 34, 1620 København V	55°40′21.34″N 12°33′23.21″E	Five-storey side and rear wing from 1907 designed by Anthon Rosen
Museum of Copenhagen		Vesterbrogade 59, 1620 København V	1787	Former headquarters of the Royal Copenhagen Shooting Society from 1787 designed by Henrich Brandemann with later side wings to the south (1868) and north (1896) and gate
Shooting Range Wall		Absalonsgade 12, 1658 København V	55°40′17.08″N 12°33′14.64″E	Protective wall from 1887 designed by Ludvig Knudsen
Skomagersvendebroderskabets Stiftelse		Gasværksvej 25, 1656 København V	55°40′13.38″N 12°33′28.35″E	Residential building from 1859
Sorte Hest		Vesterbrogade 148A, 1620 København V		Former roadside inn: Wing along Vesterbrogade from 1781 which was heightened from two to three storeys in c, 1825
Sorte Hest		Vesterbrogade 148F, 1620 København V		Former roadside inn: Building at the corner from 1797 with side wing from 1797 which was lengtherened in 1872 /extension heightened in 1929
Sorte Hest		Vesterbrogade 148H, 1620 København V		Former inn from 1771
Sundevedsgade 4		Sundevedsgade 4, 1751 København V	1858	Residential building from 1858
Tvedes Bryggeri		Vesterbrogade 140A, 1620 København V	1862	Former brewert consisting of a building from 1862 and an extension from 1884
Tvedes Bryggeri		Vesterbrogade 142A, 1620 København V	1862	Former brewert consisting of a building from 1862 and an extension from 1884
Tvedes Stiftelse		Vesterbrogade 144A, 1620 København V	1862	Residential building from 1878 by C.A.C. Leser
Vesterbro Pharmacy		Vesterbrogade 72, 1620 København V	55°40′22.16″N 12°33′5.99″E	Former pharmacy consisting of a house on the street from 18 1853 by P.C. Hagemann, a garden house ad a laboratory building from 1883
Vesterbro Pharmacy		Vesterbrogade 72A, 1620 København V	55°40′23.21″N 12°33′6.04″E	Former pharmacy consisting of a house on the street from 18 1853 by P.C. Hagemann, a garden house ad a laboratory building from 1883
Vesterbro Pharmacy		Vesterbrogade 72B, 1620 København V	55°40′23.6″N 12°33′6.19″E	Former pharmacy consisting of a house on the street from 18 1853 by P.C. Hagemann, a garden house ad a laboratory building from 1883
Viktoriagade 8		Viktoriagade 8A, 1655 København V	1850	Apartment building from 1850
Viktoriagade 10		Viktoriagade 810, 1655 København V	1972	Apartment building from 1862
Viktoriagade 12		Viktoriagade 812, 1655 København V	1863 and 1881	Apartment building from 1863 and 1881
Wegener House		Vesterbrogade 60, 1620 København V	55°40′21.72″N 12°33′11.84″E	Apartment building with ground floor shop from 185.
Wegener House		Vesterbrogade 60A, 1620 København V	55°40′22.76″N 12°33′11.74″E	Residential rear wing from 1867 by Carl Tasmussen.
Wegener House		Vesterbrogade 60B, 1620 København V	55°40′23.38″N 12°33′11.88″E	Library building from 1867 by Carl Tasmussen.
