= Wegener House =

Historica building in Copenhagen, Denmark

- Wegeners Gård
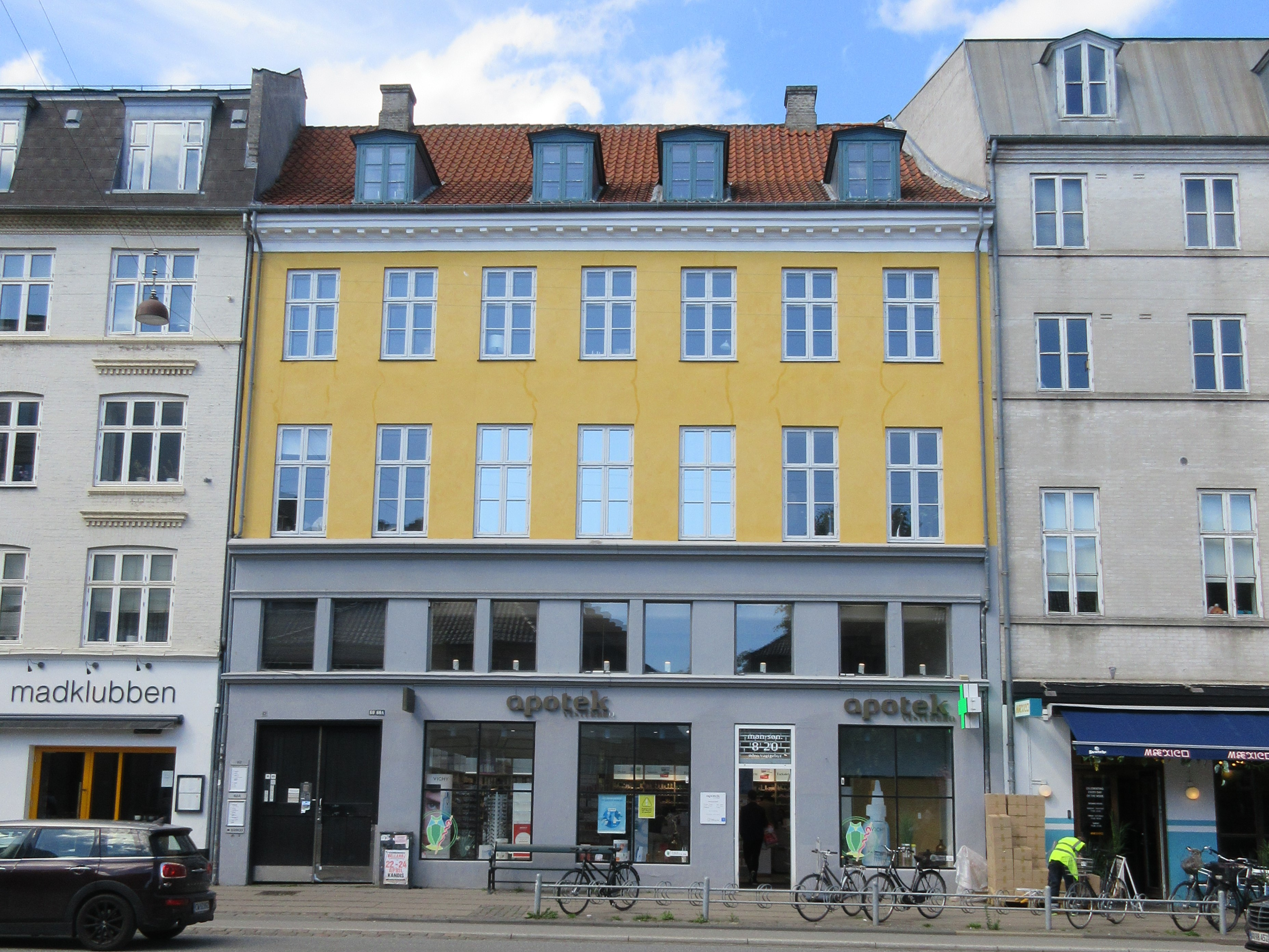
- The Wegener House in 2022.
- Interactive map of the Wegener House area

General information
- Location: Copenhagen, Denmark
- Coordinates: 55°40′22″N 12°33′12″E
- Completed: 1854/1867

The Wegener House (Danish: Wegeners Gård) is a mid 19th-century building complex on Vesterbrogade in the Vesterbro district of Copenhagen, Denmark. In the first half of the 19th century the property was the site of first James Price's summer theatre and then of Vesterbro Morskabsteater.The latter was replaced by the present building on the site in the late 1840s. The property was acquired by royal historian and archivist C.F. Wegener in 1856. In 1867, Wegener expanded the building with a new four-storey rear wing as well as a library building for his extensive private book collection. The rear wing and the library building are connected to each other by a first floor skywalk, The three buildings were listed in the Danish registry of protected buildings and places in 1981.

== History ==
=== Den Hvide Svane ===
The site was formerly part of the garden of a roadside inn known as Den Hvide Swan (The White Swan). Den Hvide Svane was established on the site in 1740. It occupied a large site corresponding to the properties now known as Vesterbrogade 52–62. The easternmost part of the garden (now Vesterbrogade 52) was sold off in 1798. Den Hvide Svane was owned by an innkeeper named Strelow. In 1800, he sold the rest of the property to a textile manufacturer.

=== The Price family and Vesterbro Morskabsteater ===
In the summer of 1801, James Price found a permanent stage for his pantomime performances in a wooden pavilion in the garden situated to the west of Den Hvide Svane's old main building. The building was already expanded the following year. It was operated under the name Det danske National Sommer-Theater. Other attractions were later added, including fireworks, merry-go-rounds, swings and balloons. The venture was after his death in 1805 continued by his widow Hannah Price (née Tott). In 1810, she married Frantz Joseph Kuhn (1783-1832), with whom she shared her position as manager.

The building survived the British bombardment of 1807 but was nonetheless demolished in 1809. The property was the same year acquired by horse trader Lars Wolff. In 1812, Wolff sold the western part of the property to kammerråd Christian Rothe (1770-1852). The Price family found a new home for their performances a little further out of Vesterbrogade.

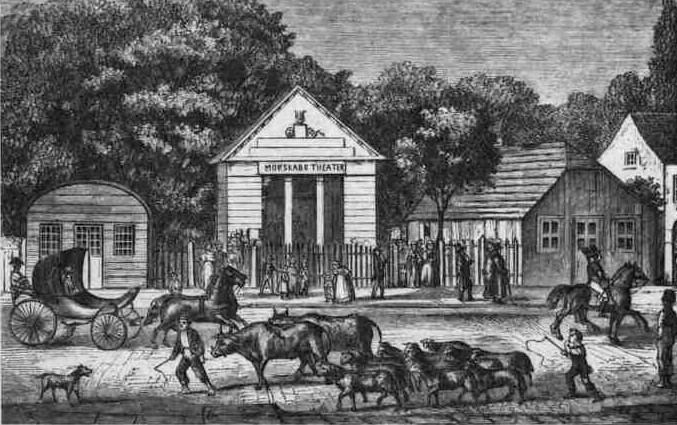
Vesterbros Morskabsteater.

The Price family returned to the property after a few years, In 1816, Kuhn bought the old garden as well as the adjacent property at Gammel Kongevej (now Gammel Kongevej 33). In 1816–17, he constructed Vesterbros Morskabsteater on the site. To the right of the theatre was a pastry shop. The theatre building was later expanded several times. By 1830 it had room for 600 spectators. James Price's sons James Price Jr. and Adopph Price joined the management of the theatre around the same time.

=== The new building ===
The theatre closed in 1845 due to increased competition from Georg Carstensen's Tivoli Gardens. The property was subsequently sold at auction for 4,500 Danish rigsdaler. The new owners were the master masons Johan Heinrich Lütthans (1783-1862) and J. C. S. Berlin. They were the same year granted permission to construct two identical three-storey brick buildings on the site. Johan Heinrich Lütthans was also active in the Copenhagen Fire Department. Other buildings constructed by him include the listed properties at Dronningens Tværgade 4 (1839) and Klerkegade 25 (1847). His daughter Emilie Nathalia Lütthans was married to the priest and politician Ditlev Gothard Monrad.

The site was divided into two separate properties (Lot No. 27 B 1 and 27 B 2). The western building (Vesterbrogade 60) was owned by lawyer and kancelliråd Dahl in 1854.

=== Wegener and his library ===
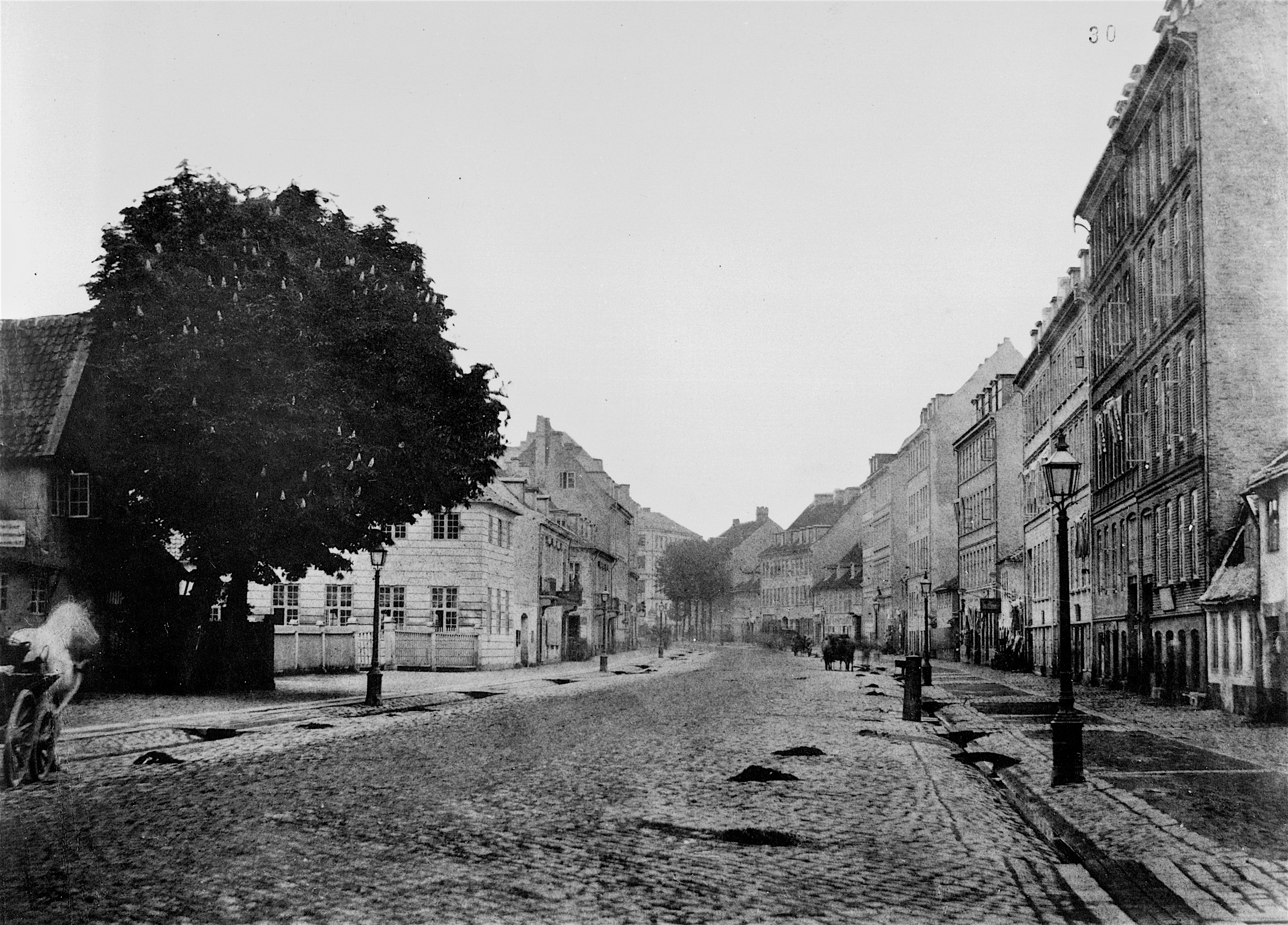
The building seen as part of the house row to the right, 1860..

In 1856, Dahl sold the property to the historian Caspar Frederik Wegener (1802-1893). He moved into the second floor apartment with his extensive private book collection of more than 22,000 volumes. In 1867, Wegener charged the architect C.F. Rasmussen with the design of a rear wing and a detached library building on the rear of his property. Rasmussen was a pupil of Gottlieb Bindesbøll.

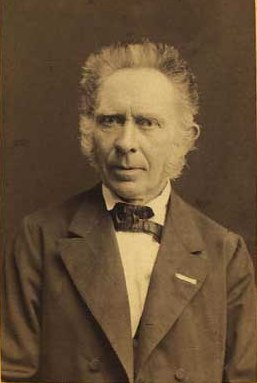
C. D. Wegener.

The property was home to a total of 47 residents in eight households at the time of the 1880 census. Casper Frederik Wegener was now residing on the first floor of the rear wing. He lived there with his housekeeper Maria Antoinette Jantzen. Laura Bügel (née Holm, 1828–1882), widow of the military officer Casper Peter Daniel Bügel (1825-1864), resided on the ground floor of the front wing with her sons August and Christian (aged 24 and 27), her daughter Mina Huitfeldt (née Bügel) and the daughter's two children (aged one and two), one nanny and one maid. William Walker Stockfleth (1792-1885), a former amtmand (county governor), resided on the first floor of the front wing with his wife Thora Mathilde Stockfleth, their daughter Vitha Charlotte Stockfleth and two maids. Lorentz Vilhelm Castenshiold, a retired district physician, resided on the second floor of the front wing with his wife Vilhelmine Charlotte Castenshiold, their son Gustav Hans Henrik Holten Castenshiold (assistant in Hof- og Stadsretten) and two maids. Christian Petersen, a grocer, resided in the basement with his wife Caroline Petersen (née Larsen), their six-year-old daughter, one male servant and one maid. Louise Marie Kramer, a widow in her 50s, resided on the ground floor of the rear wing (below Wegener, that is) with the seamstress (employee) Vilhelmine Florentine Schiørmann (née Gravesen). Tønnes Carl Christian Bohn, the local rodemester (district administrator), resided on the second floor of the rear wing (above Wegener) with his wife Pouline Bohn (née Schlichtkrull), two unmarried children (aged 25 and 27) and one maid. Alfred Balduin Theobald Pflergmacher, a former manufacturer, resided on the third floor of the rear wing with the widow Sophie Elise Christense Döllner (née Praem), his two children (aged 15 and 19) and one maid.

Wegener resided in the building until his death at the age of 91 in 1893. The ground floor of the library building was let out as a workshop to changing craftsmen.

=== Later history ===
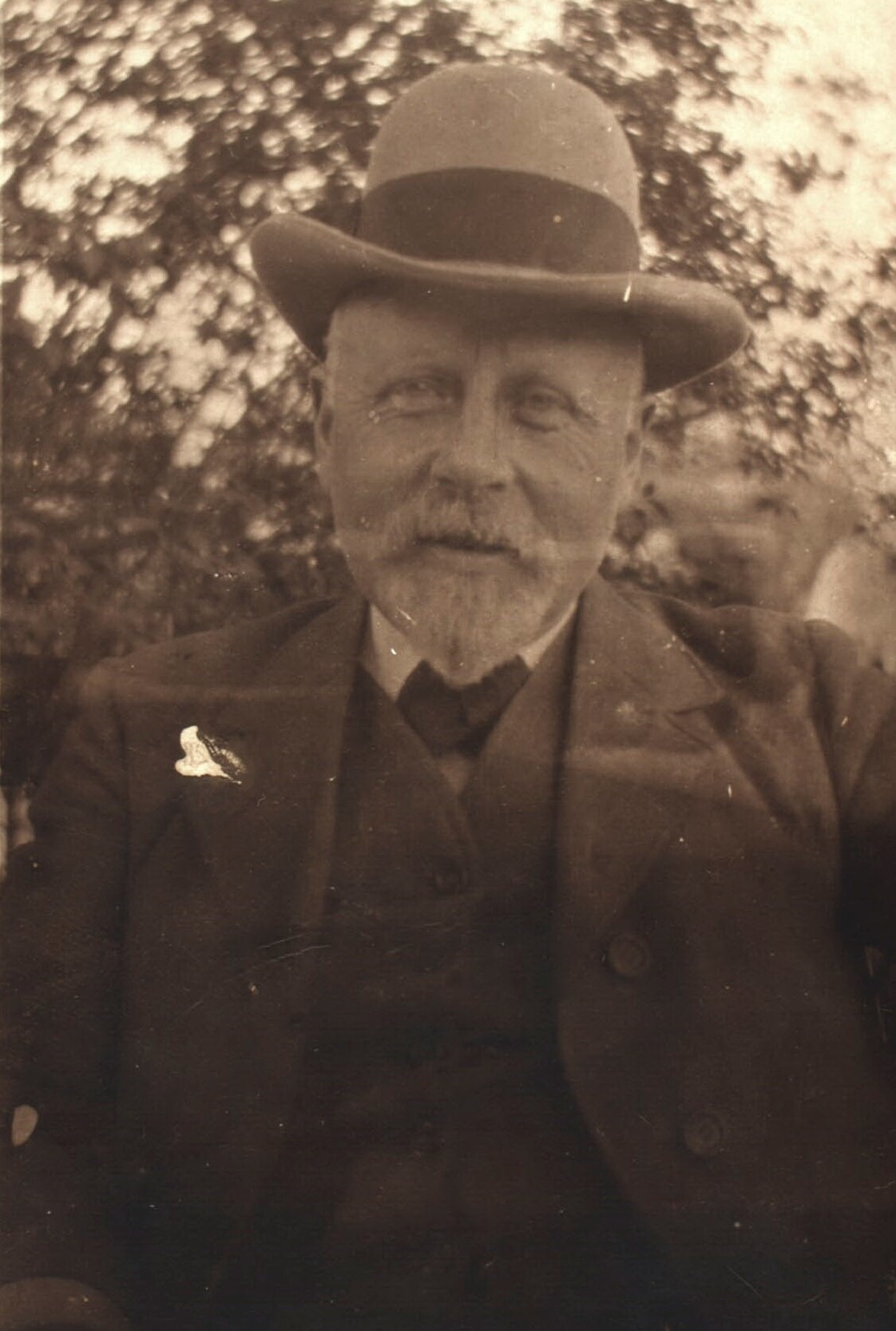
August Bang..

The bookseller August Bang purchased the property after Wegener's death in 1890. In 1897, Bang converted the building's ground floor and walk-out basement into a tall ground floor and a low mezzanine. He continued the bookshop until his own death in 1920.

Bang's son Christian August Bang (1877-) was educated in Germany and France before settling as a publisher in London. He was instrumental in introducingNordic literature to a British audience. He was therefore not interested in continuoen his father's business in Copenhagen. Bang's bookshop was upon his death in 1920 therefore passed to Ejvind Christensen (1896-). In 1924, Christensen partnered with Ernst Philipson (1894-).

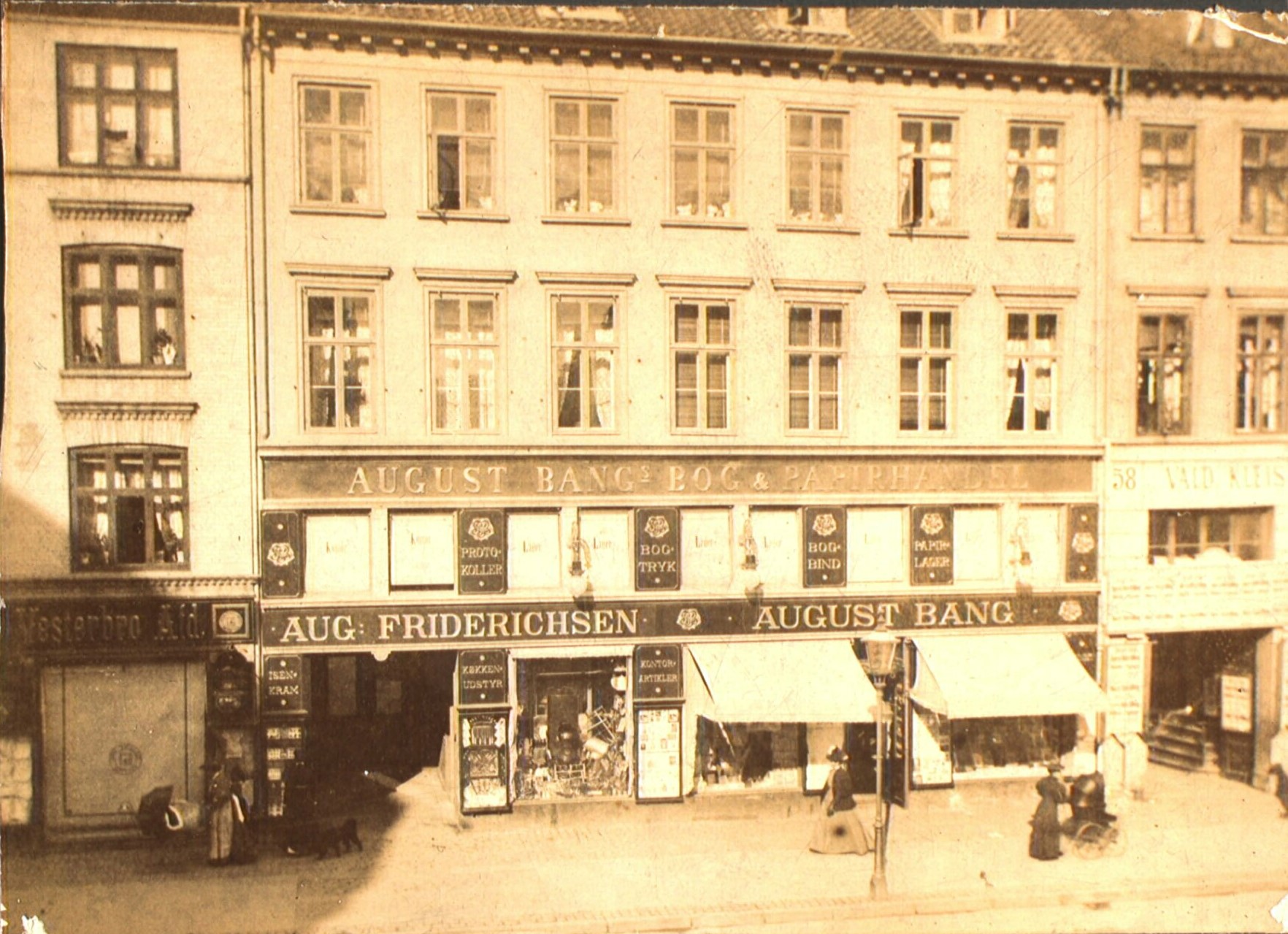
August Bang's blookshop at No. 58-60..

On 1 July 1932 the two owners divided the company between them with Christensen continuing the publishing house and Philipson continuing the bookshop (August Bang, Ernst Philipson=. On 28 May 1936, Philipson ceded the bookshop to Knud Rasmussen 1896-). Rasmussen had for some time operated Marius Møllers Boghandel a few houses down the street at Vesterbrogade 52. Philipson opened a new bookshop at Bredgade 67.

The adjacent twin building at Vesterbrogade 58 was from around 1880 home to Kleis Kunsthandel, a combined gilder's business, frame shop and commercial art gallery. This building was at some point heightened with a Mansard roof with a central three-bay gabled wall dormer. Den Frie Udstilling was founded in the building. It was destroyed by fire in 1978 and subsequently rebuilt to a different design.

== Architecture ==
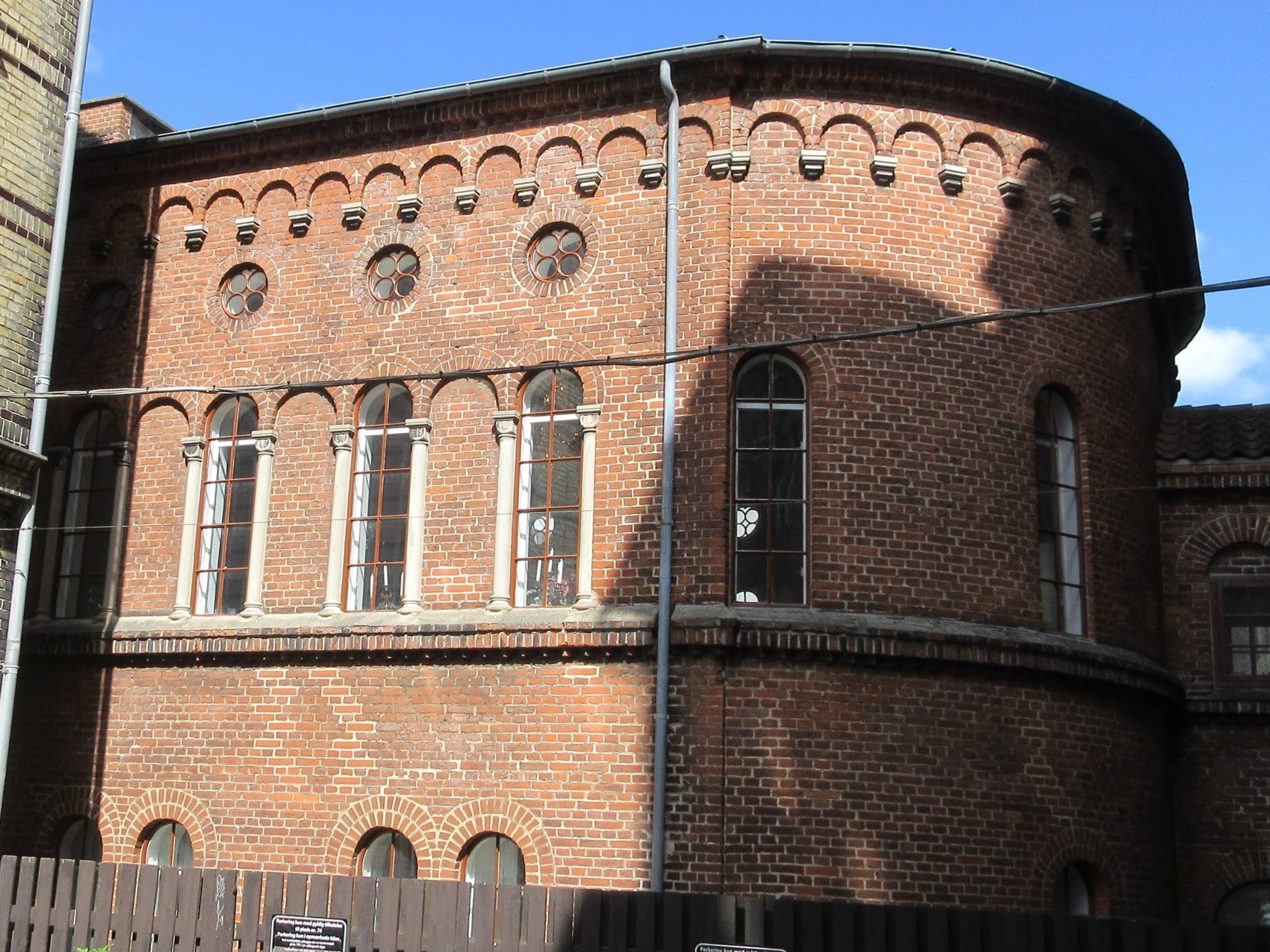
The library building viewed from the courtyard of No. 62.room

The building fronting the street is seven bays wide. The plastered facade is finished with a modilioned cornice. A short side wing extends from the rear side of the building along the boundary to No. 58- The roof is clad with red tile. A gateway in the western side of the building provides access to a narrow courtyard.

Th four-storey rear wing and the library building are both constructed in undressed red brick. The southern part of the library building (facing the rear wing) is curved like the apse of a church. The first floor windows are tall and arched and above them is a row of small round windows as well as a Lombard band below the roof.

== Today ==
Today the library is known as Lorelei's Concert Hall. It is owned by psychologist, author and composer Majken Lorelei Matzau, who lives and works there and gives concerts in the historic hall. Matzau purchased the apartement containing the library building in 2014.

== Gallery ==
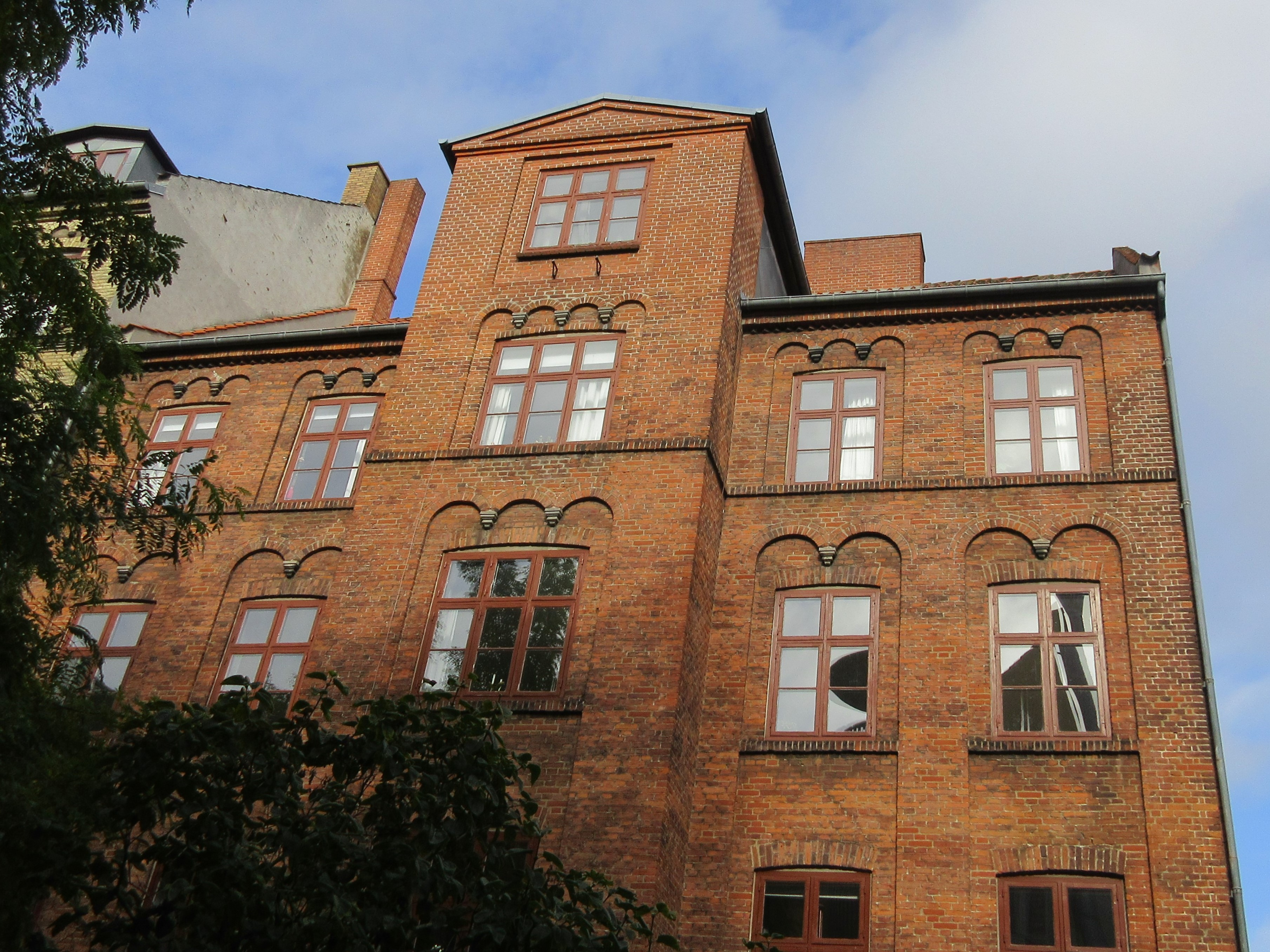
Mp. 60B: The residential cross wing.

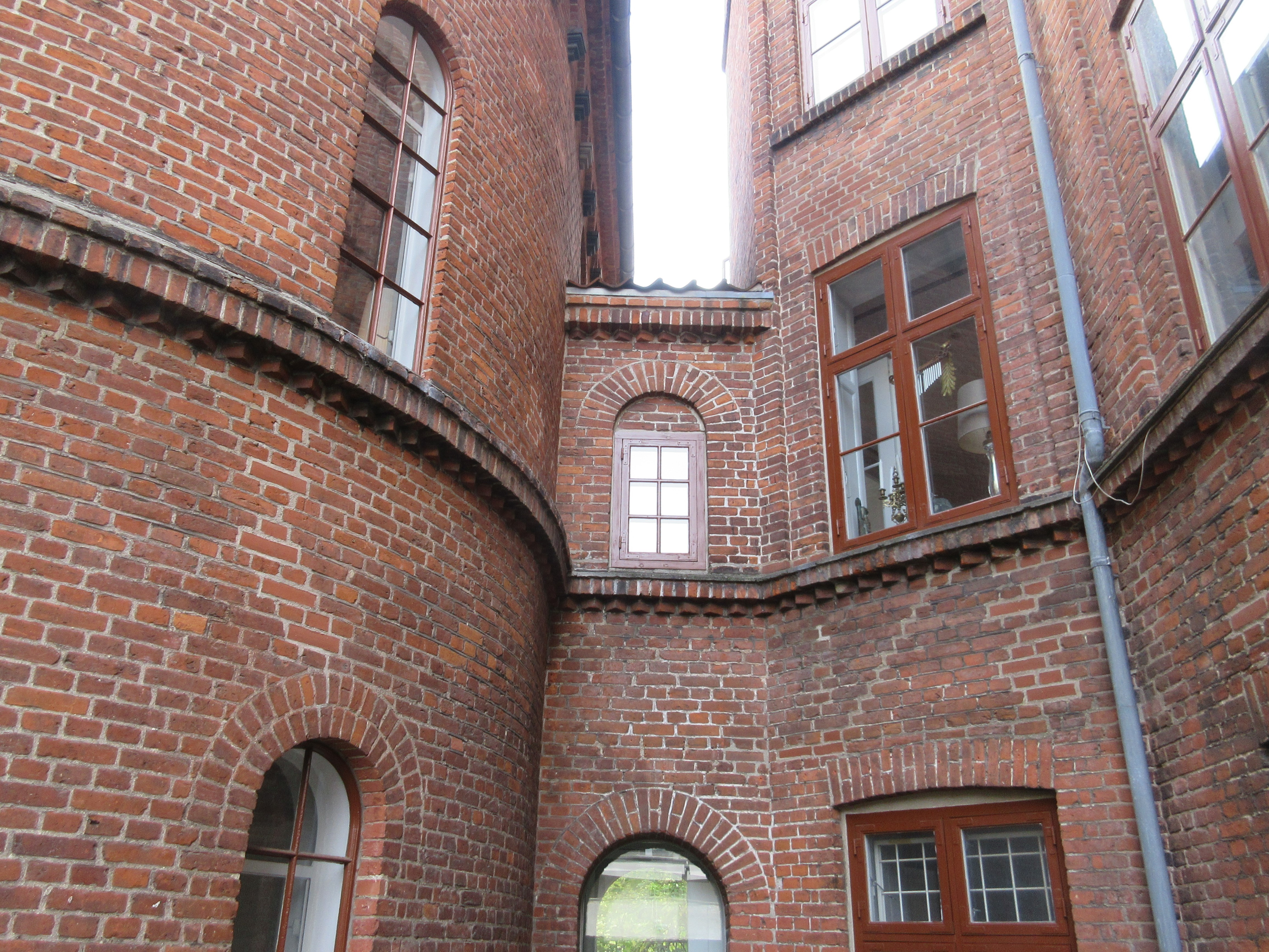
The skywalk linking the residential building No. 60B with the Library Building (No. 60 C)

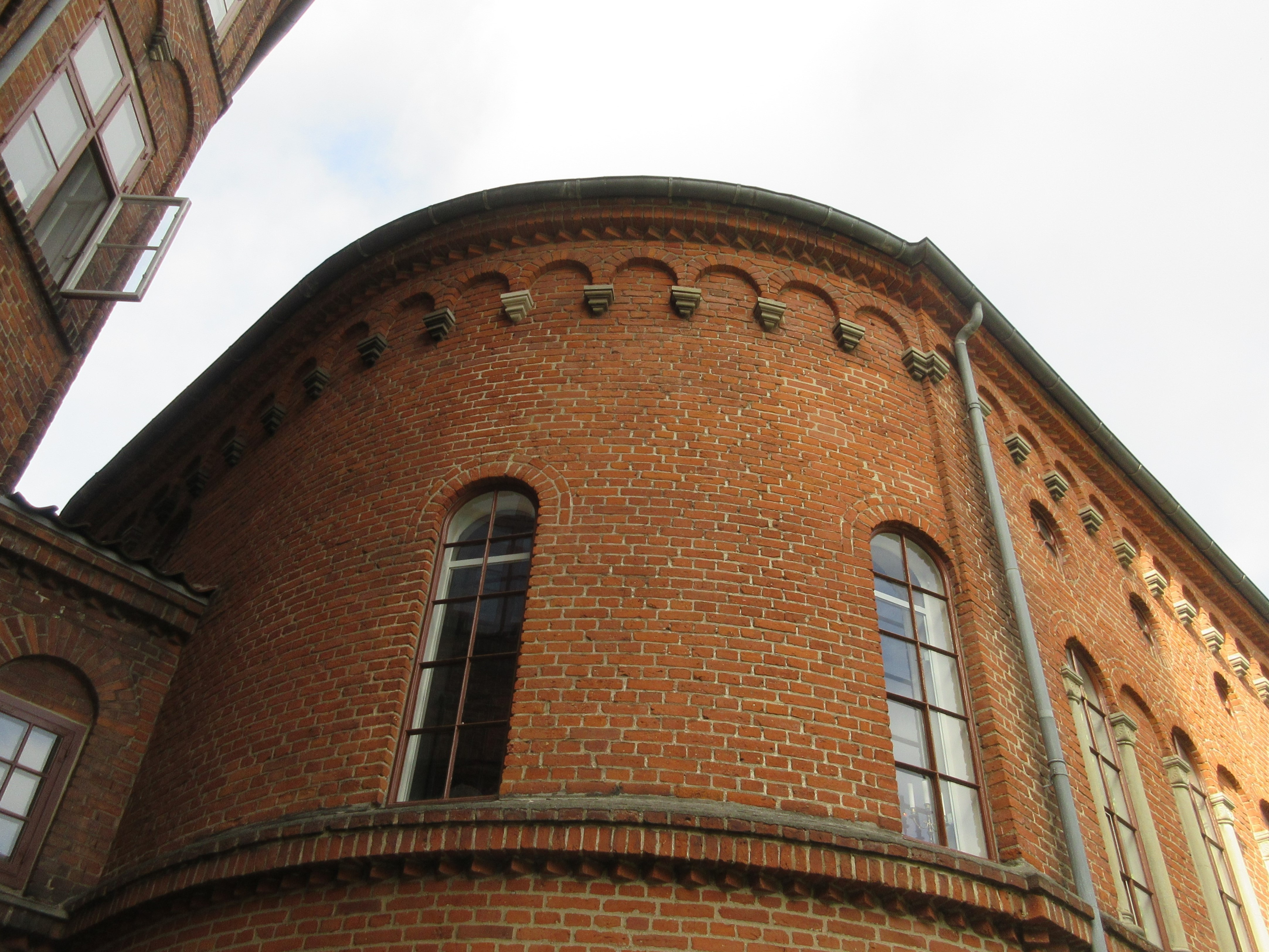
The curved side of the Library Building.

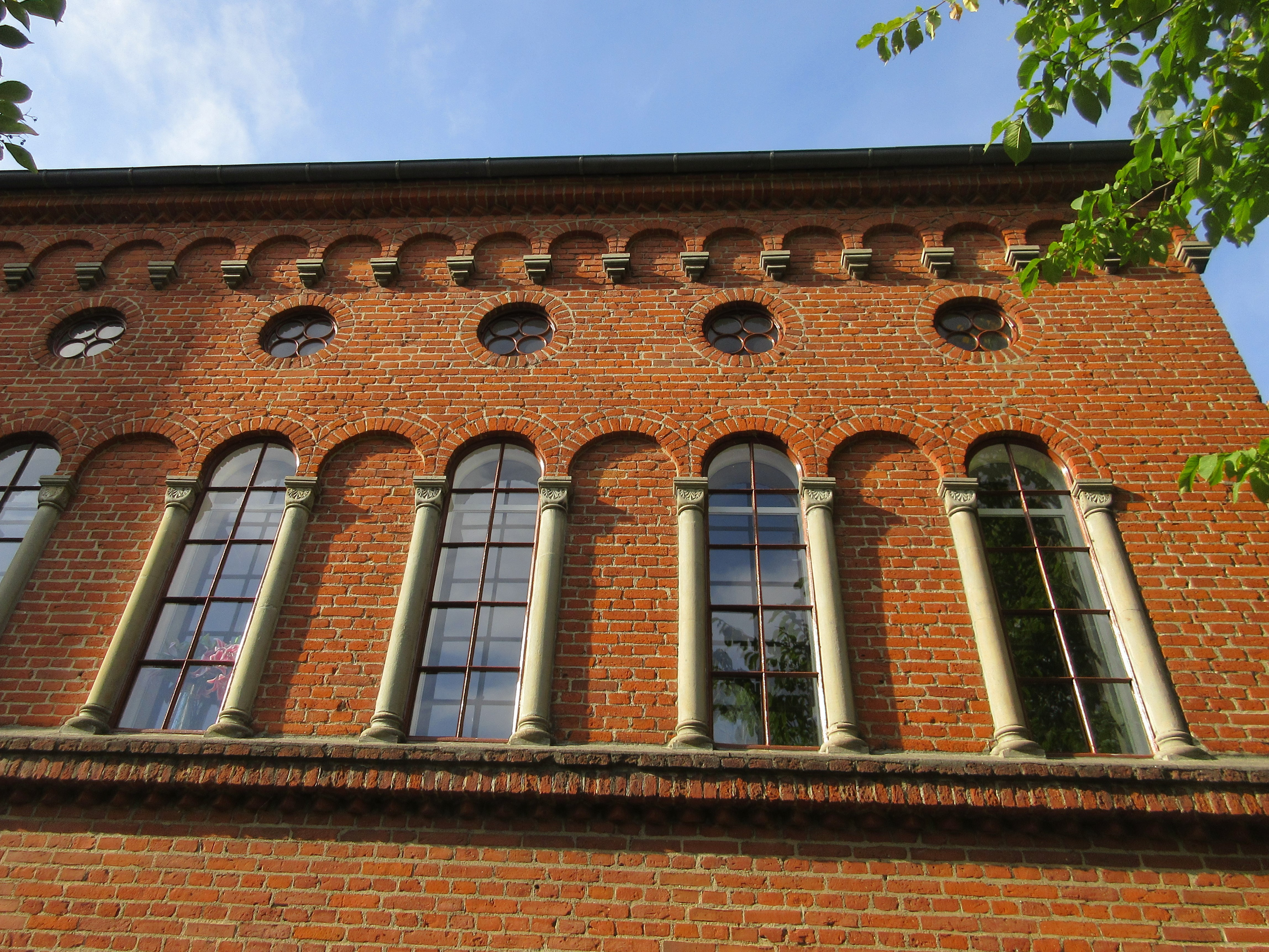
The east side of the Library Building

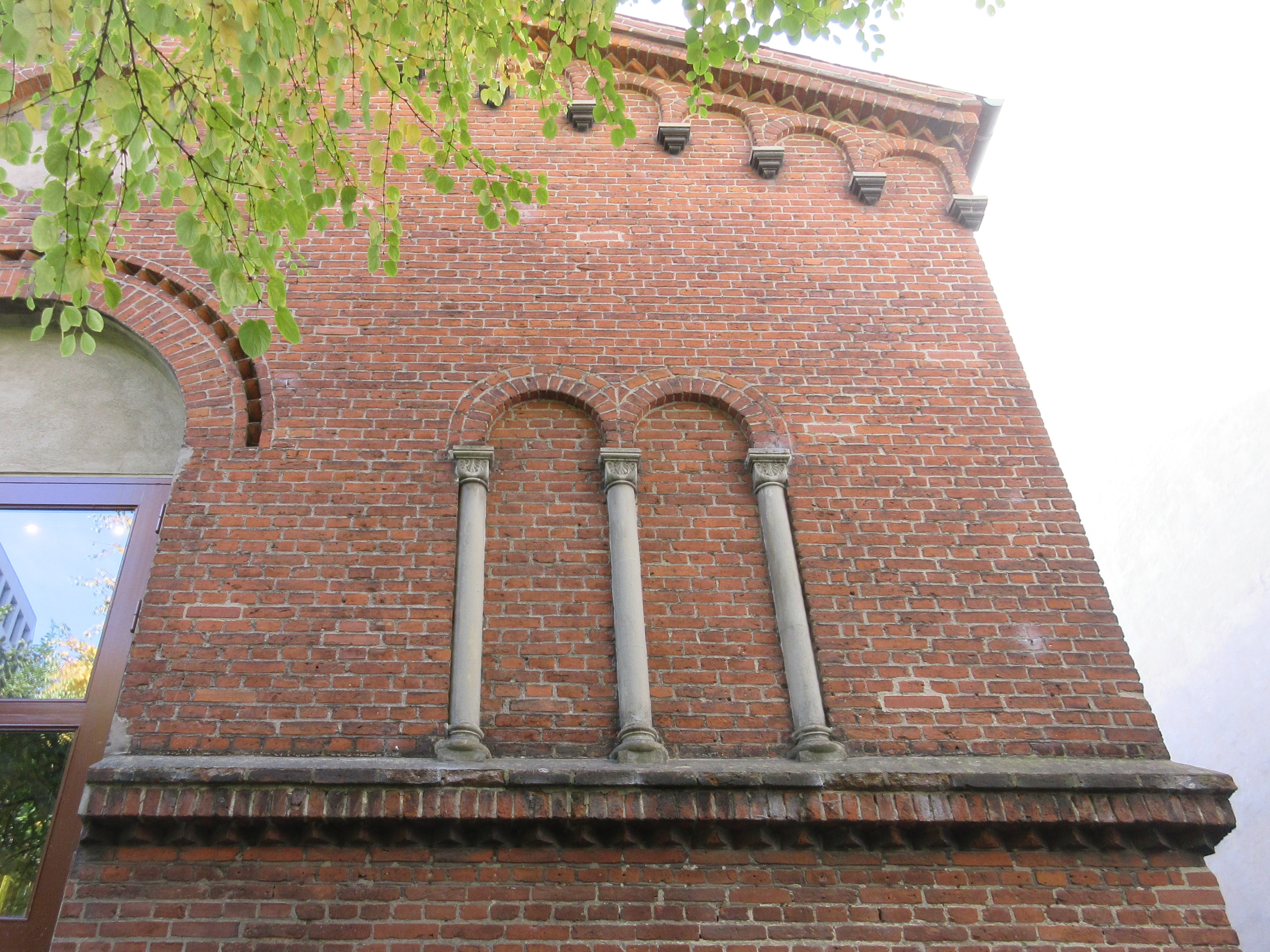
Detail from the gabled north side of the Library Building.

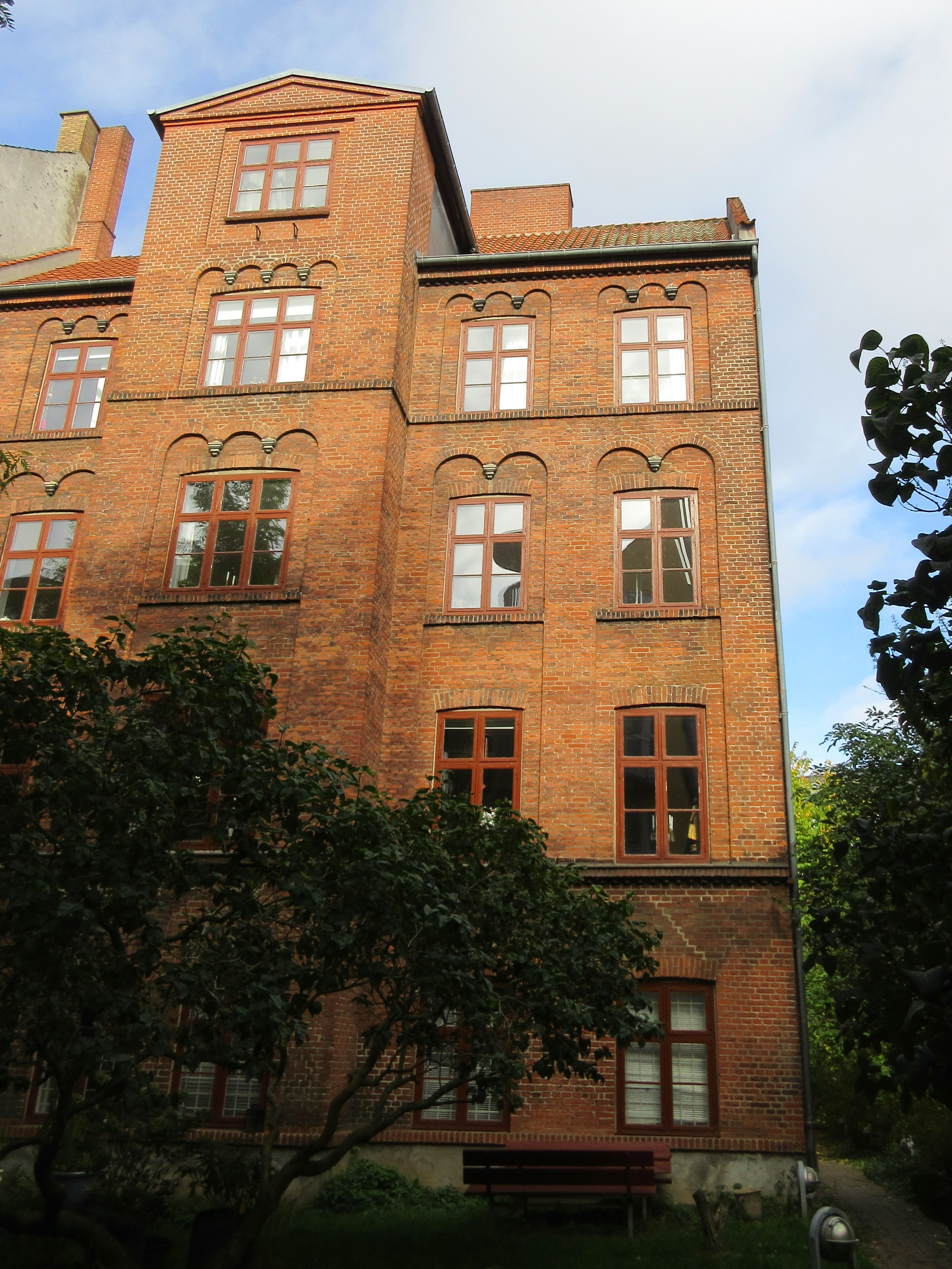
No. 60B. The residential cross wing.

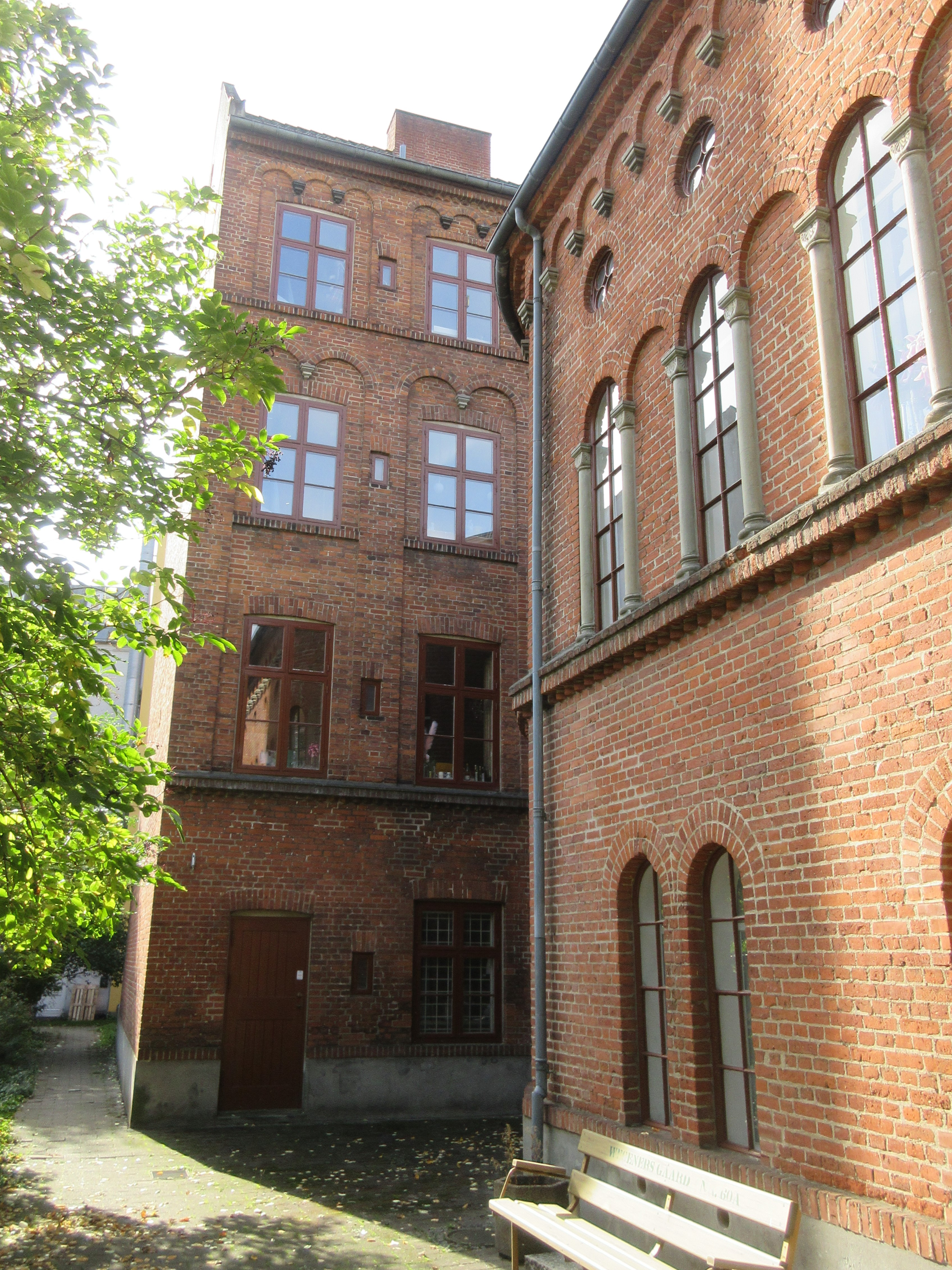
The rear side of the cross wing viewed along the east side of the Library Building.

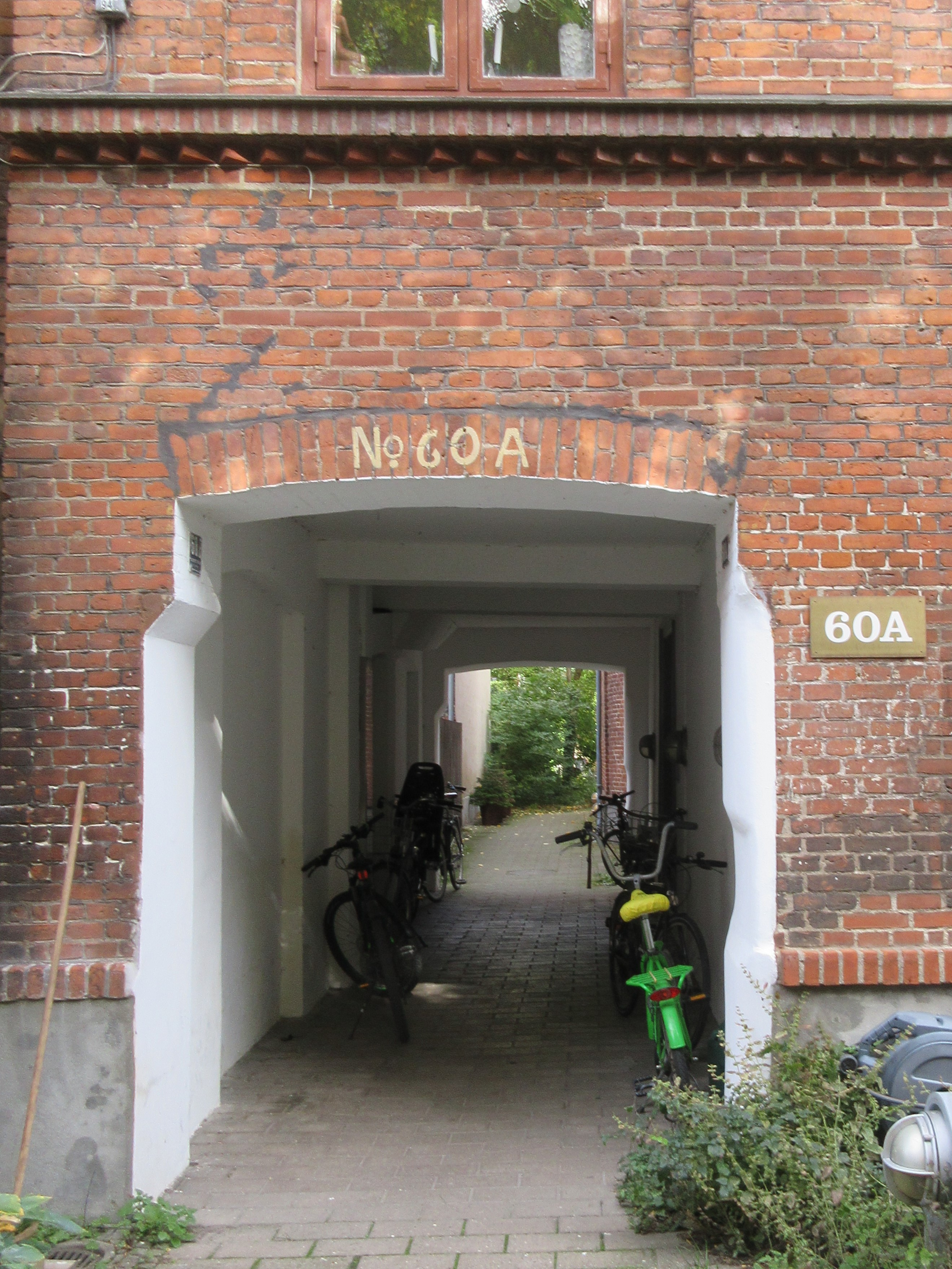
The open archway

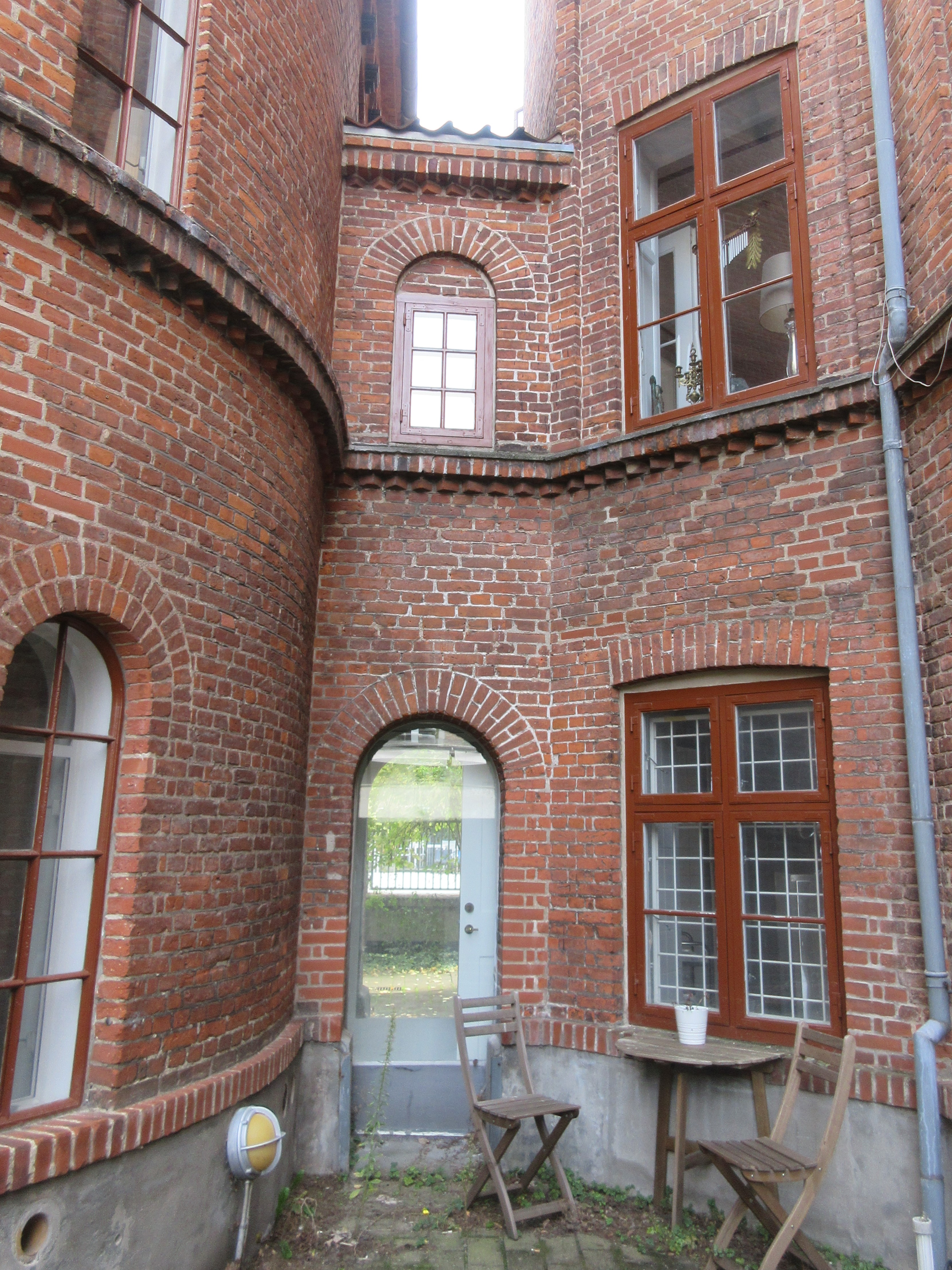
The skywalk.
