= Sorte Hest =

Copenhagen building

Coordinates: 55.6704°N 12.5398°E

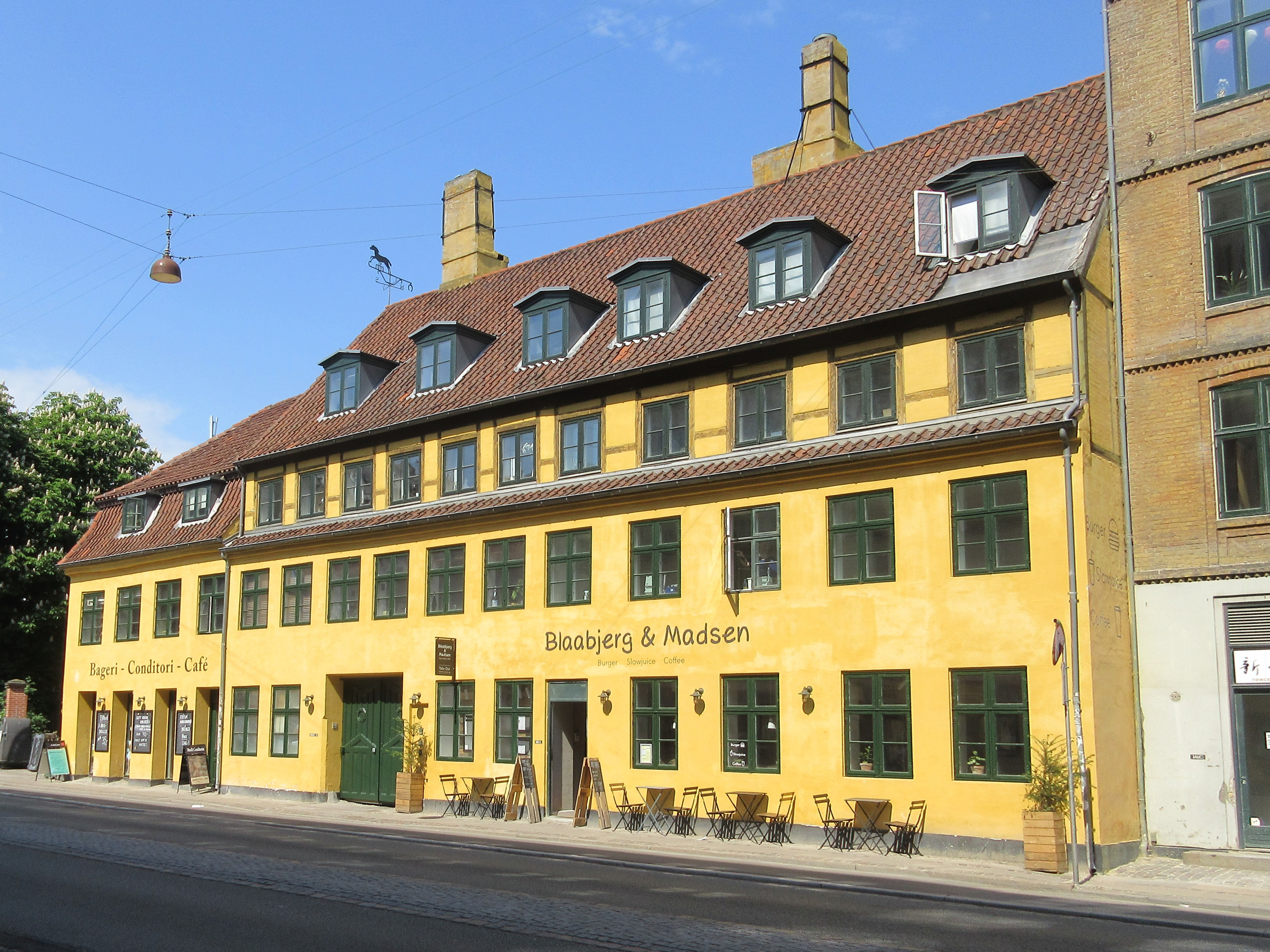
- The Sorte Hest in 2018
- Interactive map of the Sorte Hest area

General information
- Location: Copenhagen, Denmark
- Completed: 1771

Sorte Hest (English: Black Horse) is the oldest building in the Vesterbro district of Copenhagen, Denmark. A former roadside inn, then located well outside the limits of the fortified city, standing on the Vestre Landevej (Western Country Road) leading in and out of Copenhagen through the Western City Gate. It provided accommodation for travellers as well as citizens who failed to enter the city before the city gates were locked at sunset. Today it houses a bakery and café as well as apartments. The buildings date from 1770–1800. The entire complex was listed in the Danish registry of protected buildings and places in 1980.

The building lends its name to Teatret Sorte Hest, a theatre based in an adjacent building. The theatre's building is not related to the former inn. It is a former iron foundry founded by Heinrich Meldahl, father of the architect Ferdinand Meldahl.

== History ==
=== The four Horses ===
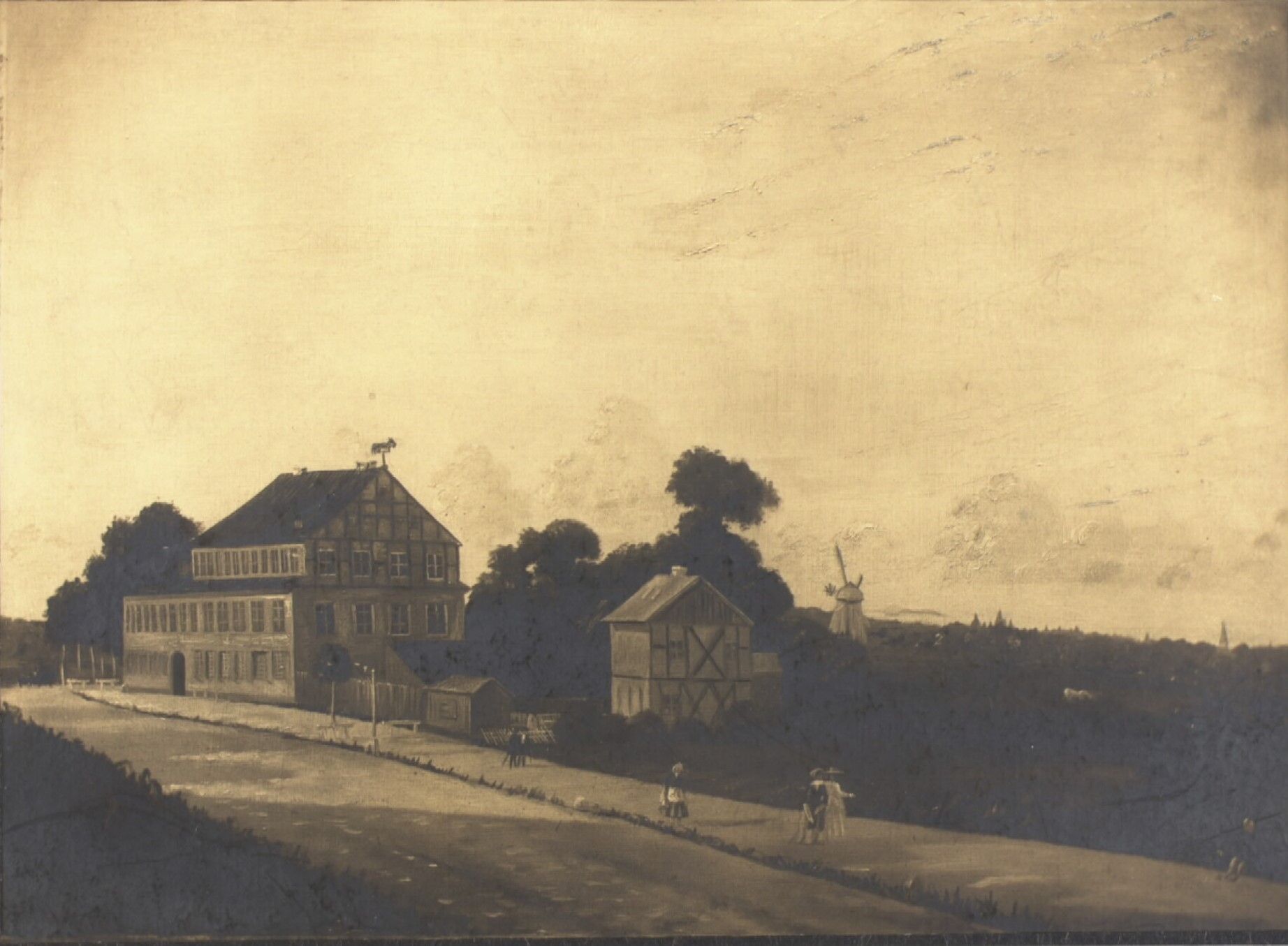
Sorte Hest with Winstrup's Windmill in the background.

The Black Horse was one out of four inns known as "Horses" located along the western access road to Copenhagen. Closest to the city stood the Green Horse, then followed the White Horse, the Yellow Horse and farthest out, on the border to Frederiksberg, the Black Horse. In between these inns were even more establishments catering for travellers. Competition was thus fierce and at some point both the Green and White Horses closed.

The Yellow Horse, with four pavilions and two bowling courses, only survived because it also went into tobacco manufacturing. Part of the area between the Vestre Landevej and Frederiksberg Allé was laid out as tobacco fields and a horse-driven mill was constructed for the processing of tobacco into snus. Other exotic produce cultivated on the estate included peaches, apricots, mulberries and grapes. In the mid-19th century the property was acquired by a couple of akvavit manufacturers who had realized that real estate was a much more lucrative business. They became rich from selling off the land in parcels to developers to use for the construction of multi-story apartment buildings, turning Vestre Landevej into urban Vesterbrogade.

=== The Black Horse ===
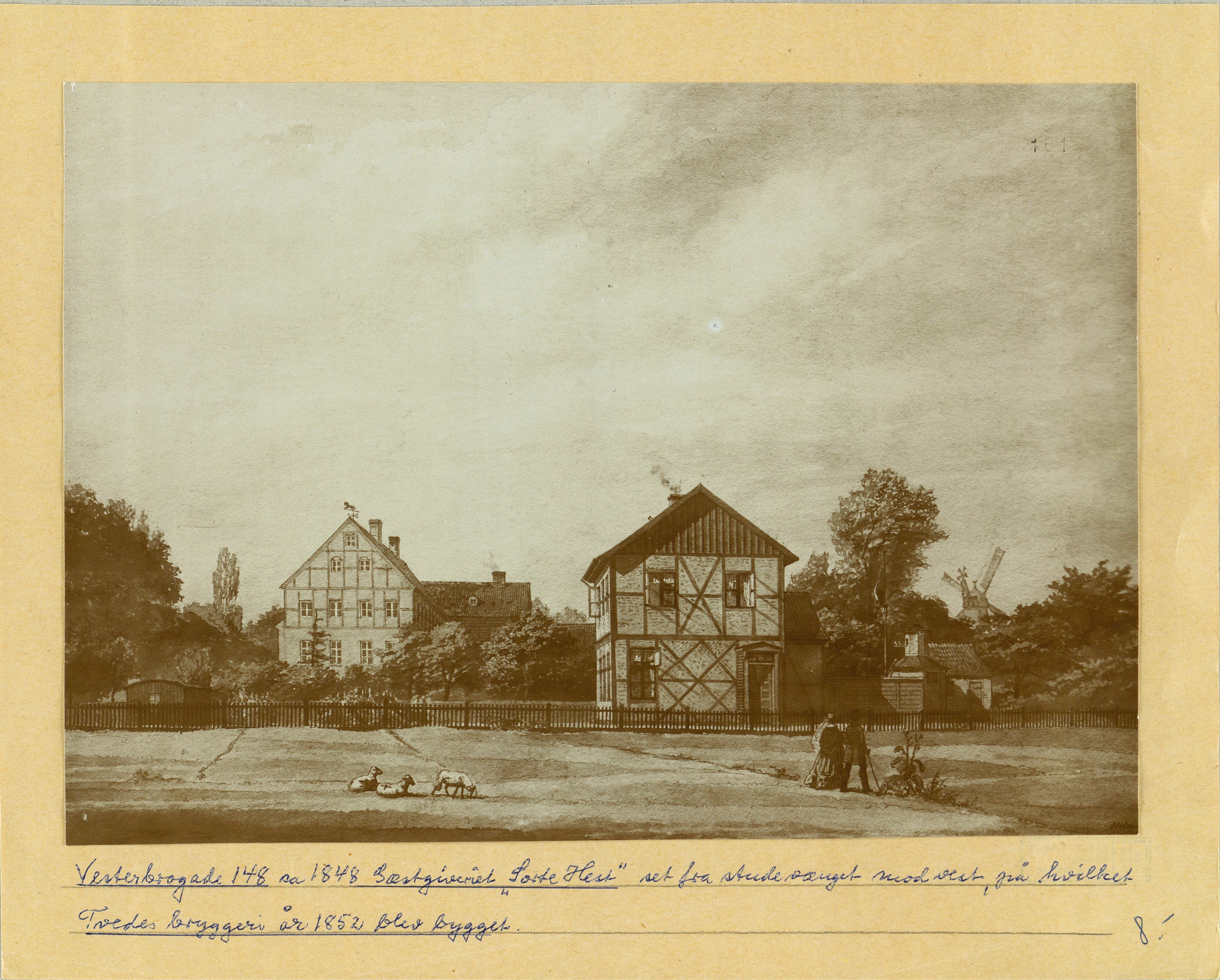
H.G.F. Holm: Sorte Hest viewed from the west, 1848

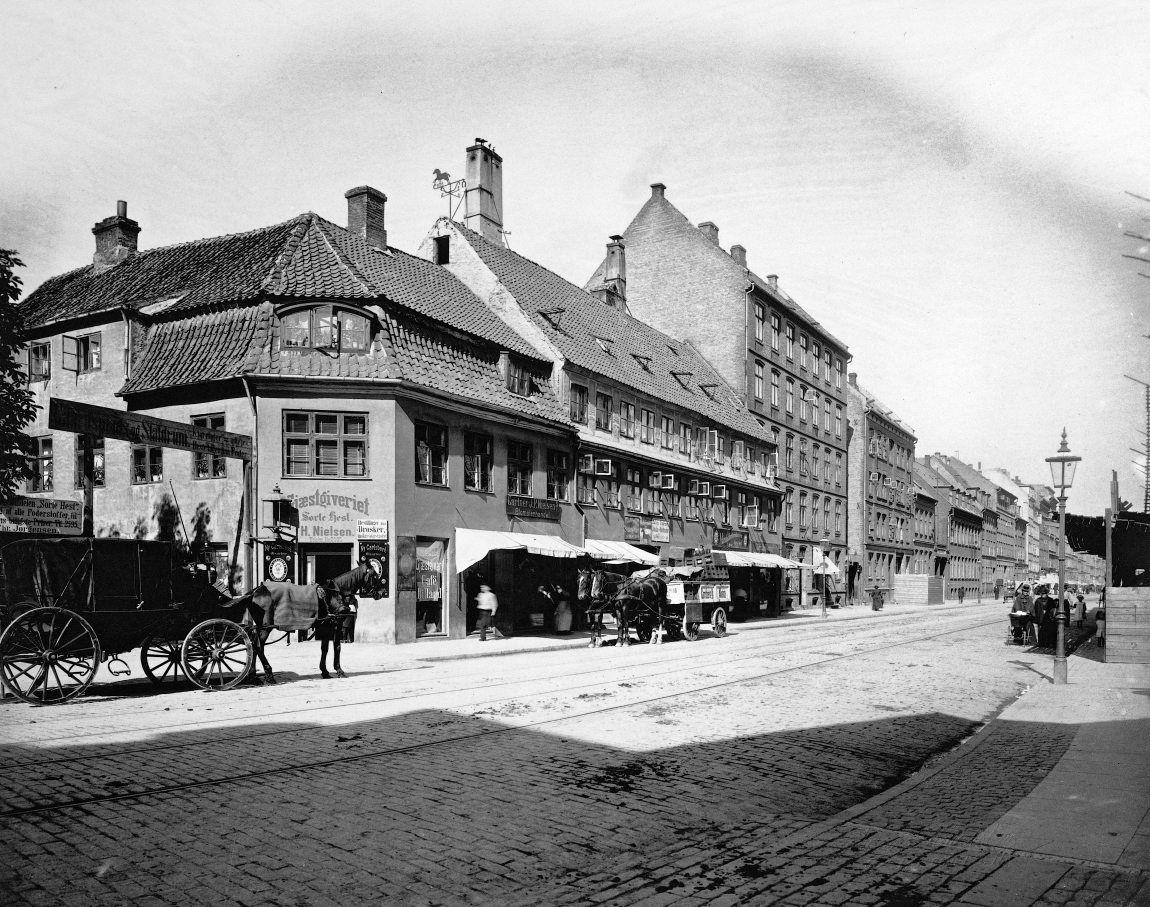
Sorte Hest in 1899

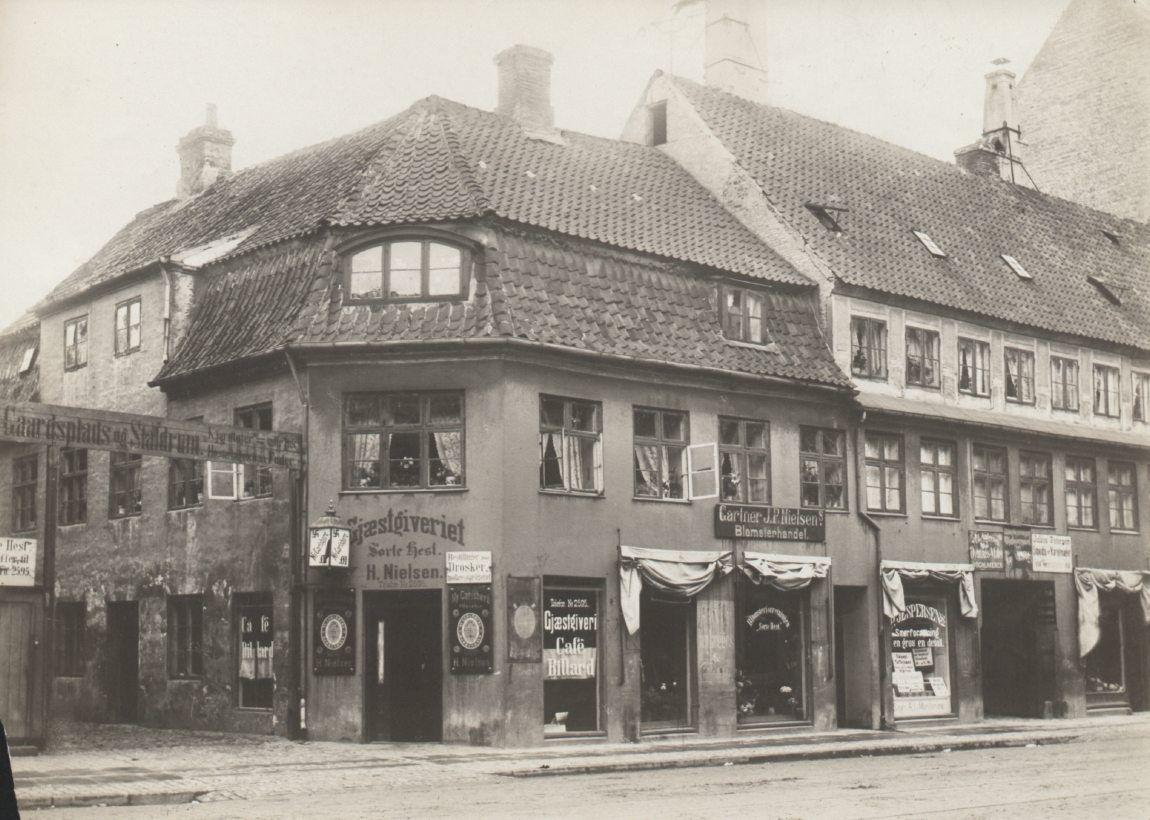
Sorte Hest in 1900

Further out on Vesterbro, the Black Horse had been an inn since the 17th century. First known as the Golden Lion (Danish: Den Gyldne Løve), the current building was constructed in 1771. The closest neighbour, on the opposite side of the road, was the execution site at Vester Fælled (Western Common). It was here that the Counts Johann Friedrich Struensee and Enevold Brandt were put on public display on the breaking wheel, following their executions by beheading.

For a couple of decades in the early 19th century the building served as a masonry stove factory, before it was bought by the inn keeper Hans Rasmussen, who returned the building to its original function, although stoves were still manufactured on the upper floor. Well into the 20th century the Black Horse continued to serve as an inn, but by 1980 the building had fallen into disrepair and was left empty. In 1986, the building was occupied by the Danish Squatter's Movement and remained their premier stronghold in Copenhagen, until they were evicted by the police on 2 February 1990. The building was then scheduled for demolition, but after local opposition these plans were abandoned and the Black Horse was instead renovated and restored.

== Cultural references ==
- In Danish writer and poet Carl Bagger's 1835 book Min Broders Levned (My Brother's Life), he describes the colourful characters associated with the Black Horse, including the patron and a short man with a parrot nose and a long, blue coat.
