= Hans Jørgen Holm =

Danish architect

- Born: 9 May 1835; Copenhagen, Danish Unitary State
- Died: 22 July 1916 (aged 81); Ordrup, Denmark
- Resting place: Vestre Cemetery
- Occupation: Architect
- Spouse: Anna Dorothea Johanne Severine Nielsen
- Parents: Carl Jacob Holm (father); Johanne Henriette née Kierulf (mother)
- Buildings: Royal Library
- Movement: National Romantic Style

Academic background
- Education: Den Polytekniske Læreanstalt
- Alma mater: Royal Danish Academy of Fine Arts

Academic work
- Discipline: Architecture
- Sub-discipline: Architectural art
- Notable students: Carl Rasmussen

Signature
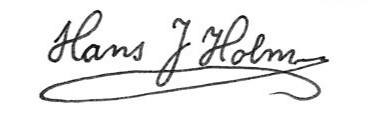

Hans Jørgen Holm (9 May 1835 – 22 July 1916) was a Danish architect. A pupil of Johan Daniel Herholdt, he became a professor at the Royal Danish Academy of Fine Arts and a leading Danish proponent of the National Romantic style.

== Biography ==
Holm was born in Copenhagen, Denmark. He was the son of Carl Jacob Holm and Johanne Henriette f. Kierulf.

He studied at the city's College of Advanced Technology before being admitted to the Royal Academy of Fine Arts, where he graduated in 1855. In the same time he worked for Gustav Friederich Hetsch and Johan Daniel Herholdt.

From 1866 to 1879, he was an assistant teaching architectural art at the architectural school and at the model school 1867–70. From 1883 to 1908, he was professor at the architectural school. In 1872–73, he was a building inspector in the City of Copenhagen. From 1883 to 1908, he was a professor at the Royal Danish Academy. He served as the architect of Roskilde Cathedral from 1898 to 1915.

He died during 1916 in Ordrup and was buried at Vestre Kirkegård in Copenhagen.

== Published works ==
- Tegninger af ældre nordisk Arkitektur (1872–84)
- Studierejser af Kunstakademiets Elever I-II (1873–87)

== Selected works ==
- Diakonissestiftelsen, the first three wings (1873–76)
- Rysensteen Gymnasium, then Tietgensgades School, Copenhagen (1885–86)
- Cattle Market (1885–86) with slaughterhouses (1887), Brown Meatpacking District, Copenhagen
- Vestre Cemetery, Copenhagen (1883-)
- Northern Chapel, Vestre Cemetery (1892)
- Southern Chapel, now the focal point of the Crossroads Project, Vestre Cemetery (1905)
- Museum of Geology, Copenhagen (1888–93)
- Skive Church, Skive (1896–98)
- Royal Danish Library, Slotsholmen, Copenhagen (1898–1906)

== Gallery ==
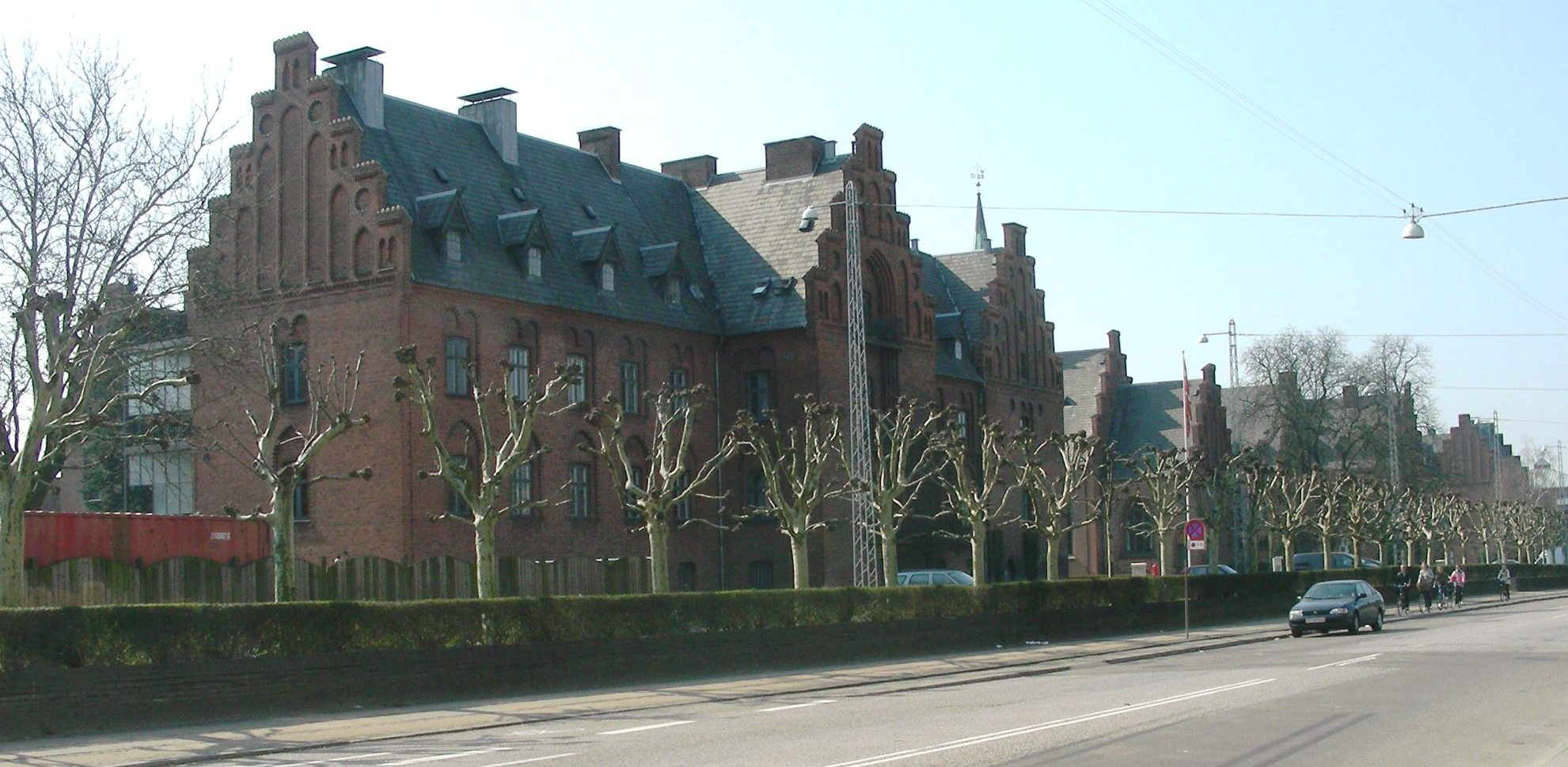
Diakonissestiftelsen, Copenhagen

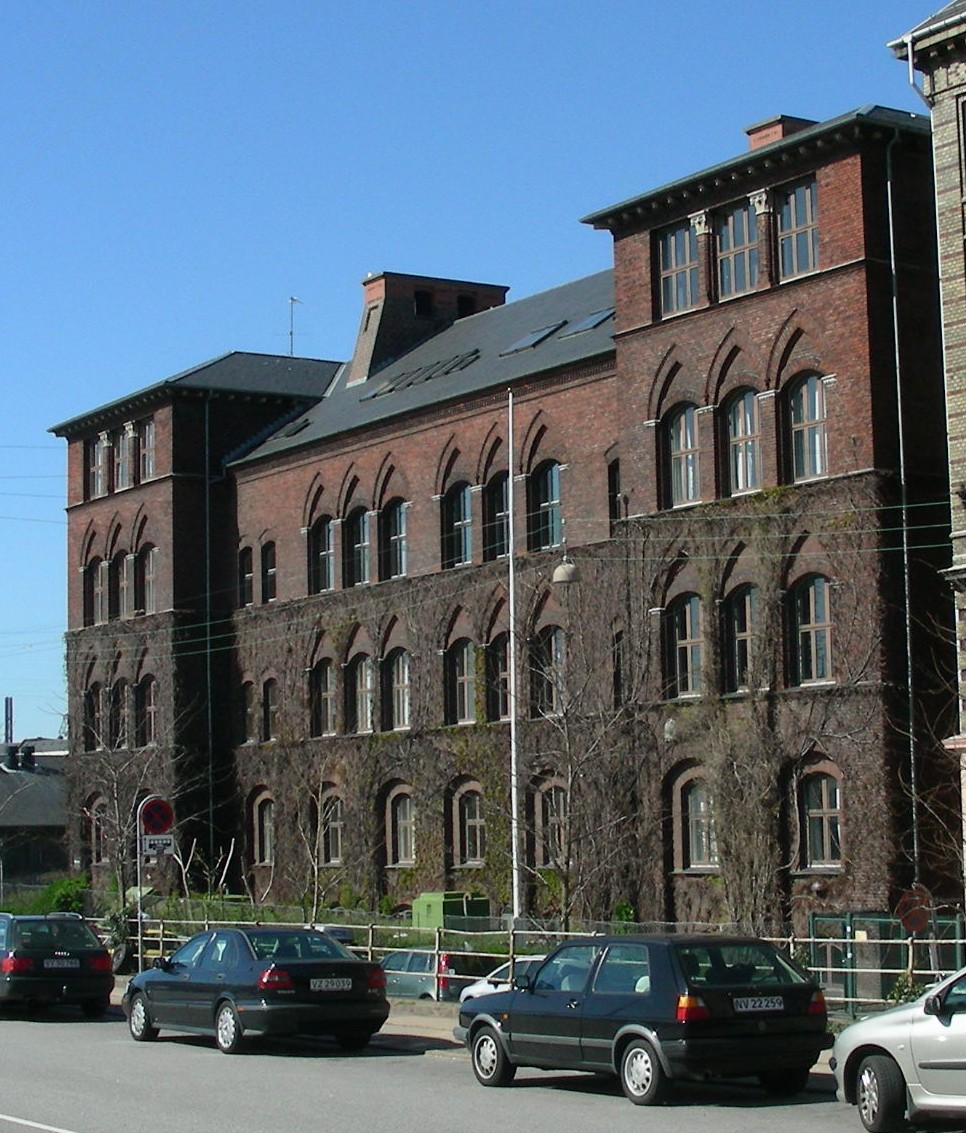
Rysensteen Gymnasium

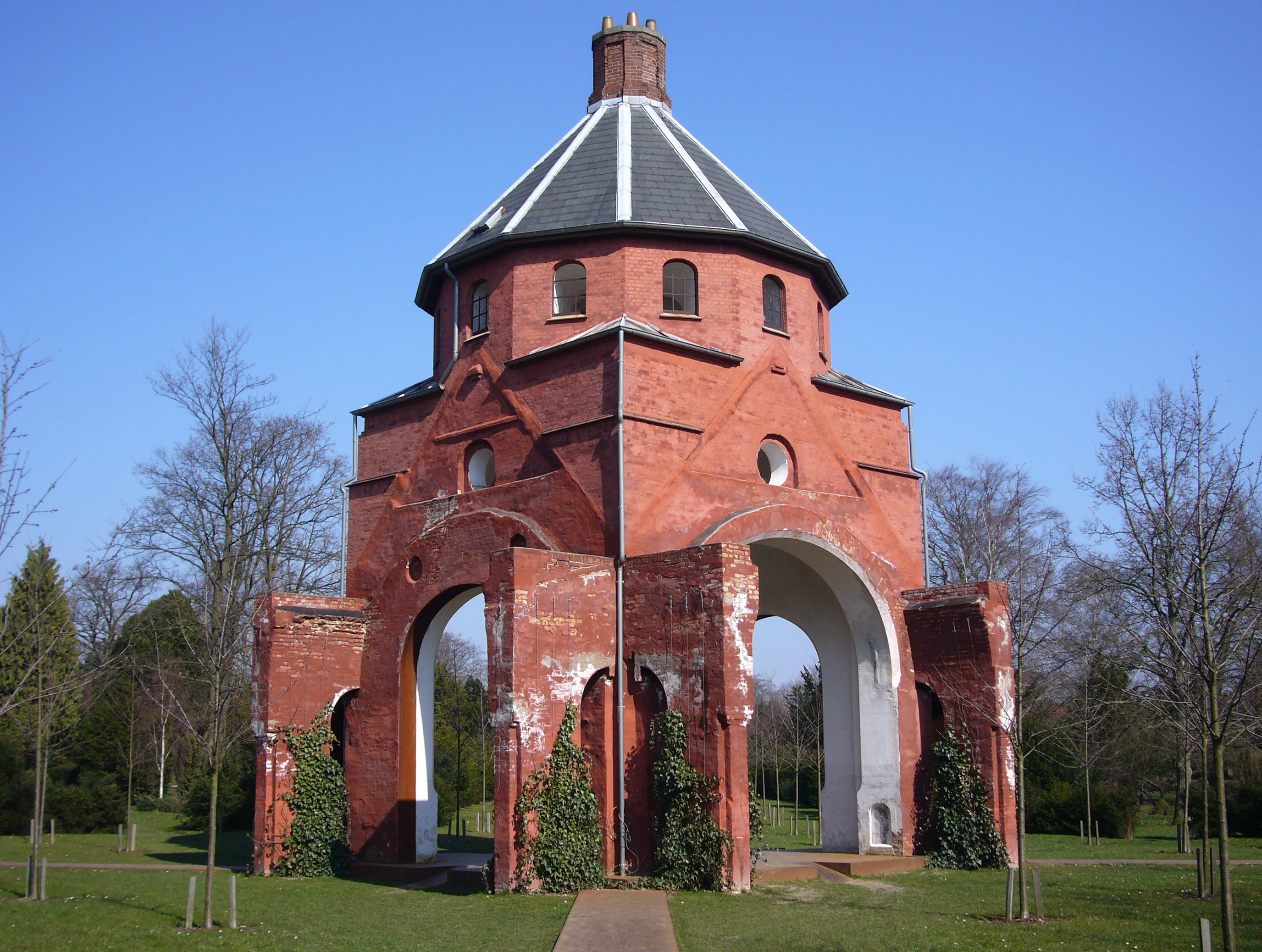
Vestre Cemetery, Copenhagen

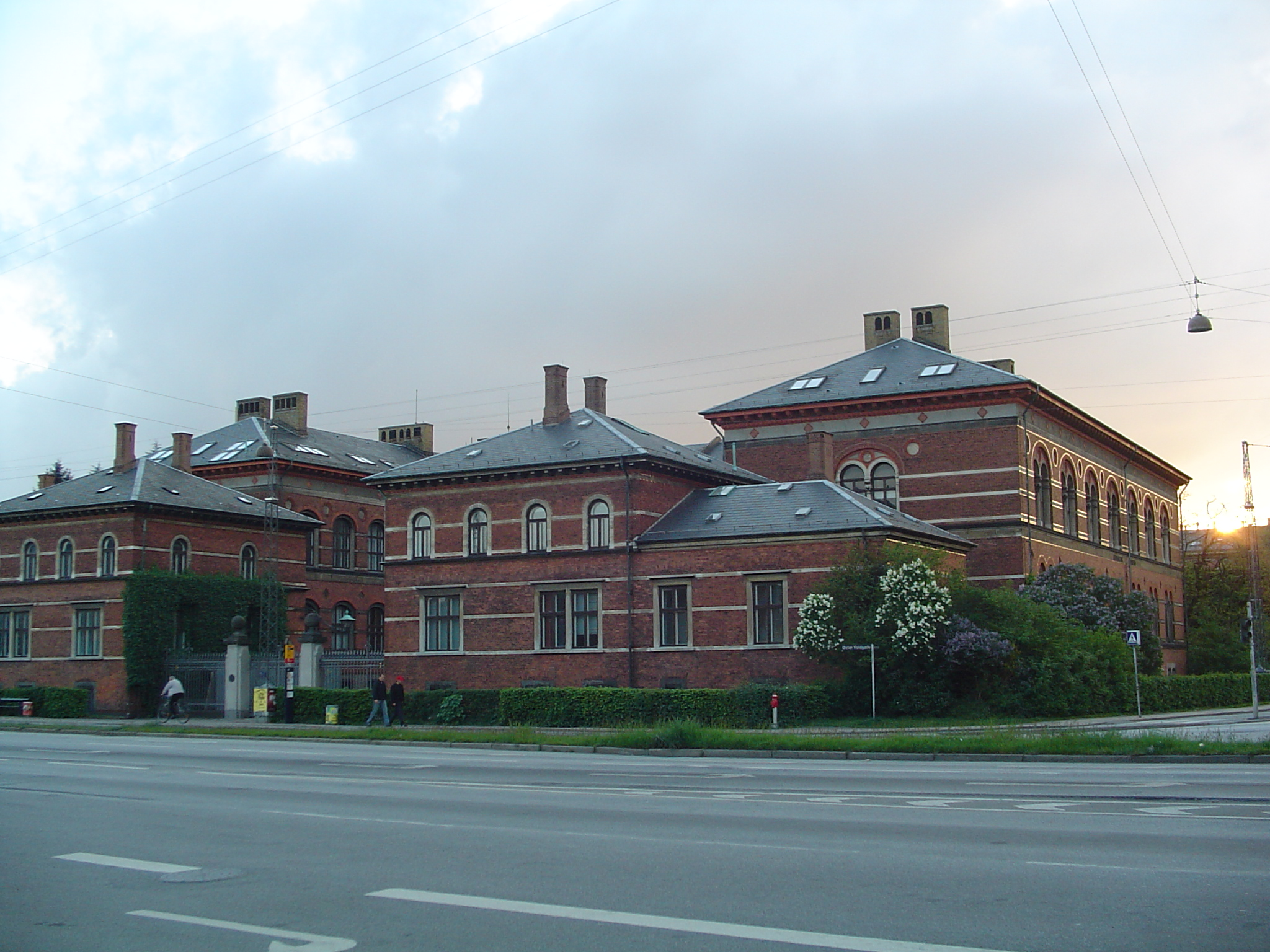
Museum of Geology, Copenhagen

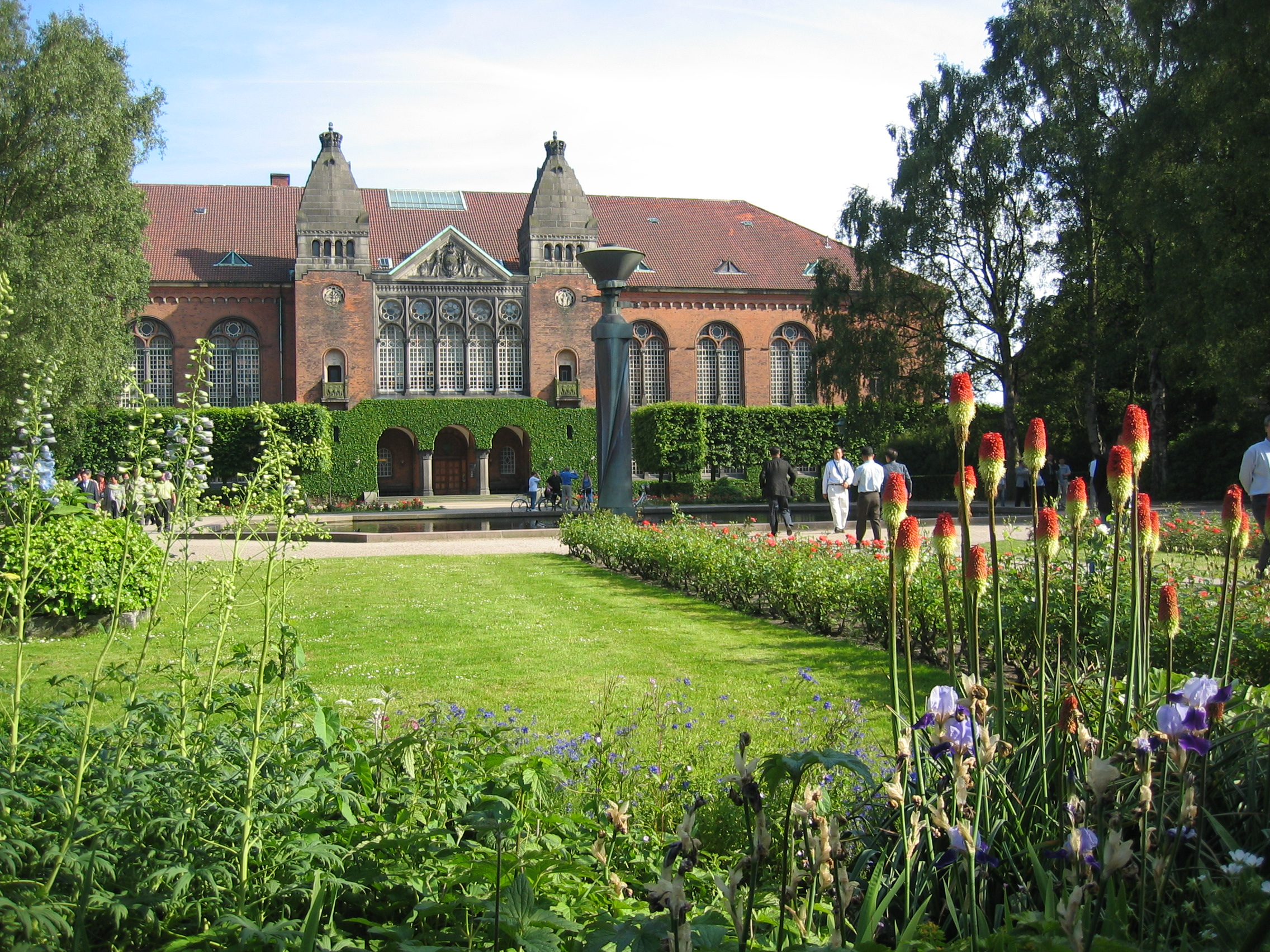
Royal Danish Library on Slotsholmen in Copenhagen

== See also ==
- List of Danish architects
