= Yellow Warehouse =

The Yellow Warehouse
- Det Gule Pakhus
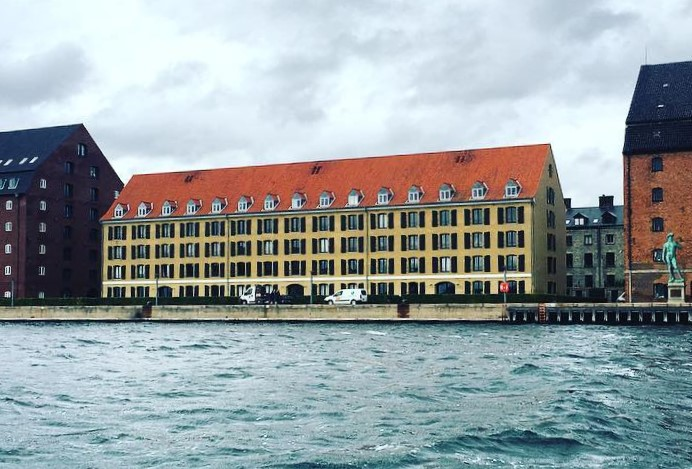
- Interactive map of the The Yellow Warehouse area

General information
- Location: Copenhagen, Denmark
- Coordinates: 55°41′7.47″N 12°35′48.07″E
- Completed: 1783
- Client: Royal Greenland Company

Design and construction
- Architect: Georg Erdman Rosenberg

The Yellow Warehouse (Danish: Det Gule Pakhus), is an 18th-century warehouse located at Toldbodgade 38 on the Larsens Plads waterfront in Copenhagen, Denmark.

== History ==
The warehouse was built by Georg Erdman Rosenberg in 1777–83 for the Royal Greenland Company. It was listed in 1944 but severely damaged in a fire in 1968. It was restored by professor Hans Munk Hansen in the late 1970s.

== Current use ==
The building has been converted into apartments.

== See also ==
- Blue Warehouse
