= Larsens Plads =

Historic waterfront in Copenhagen

Coordinates: 55.6846°N 12.5964°E

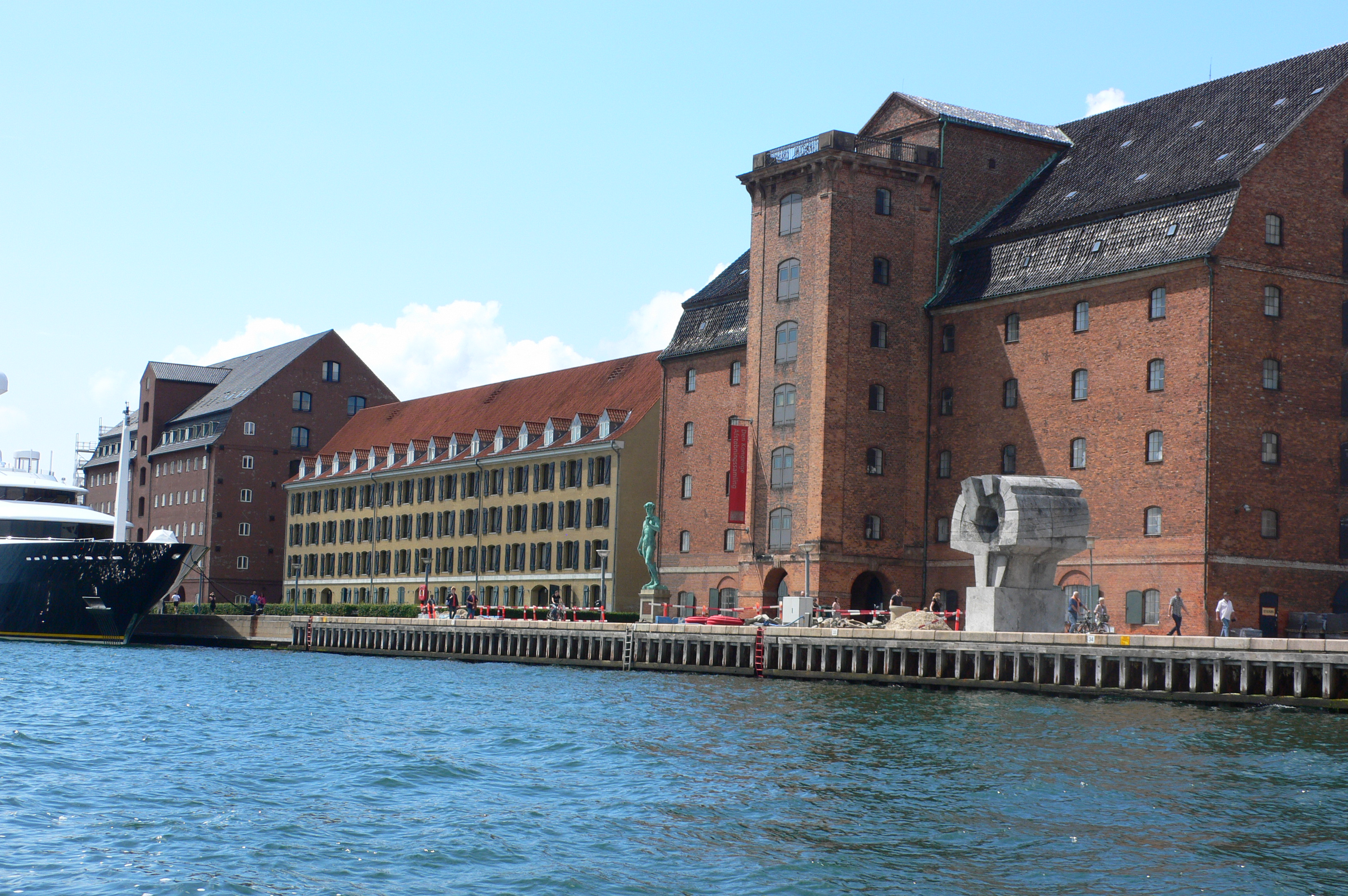
The historical warehouses along Larsens Plads viewed from the water

Larsens Plads (Larsen's Place) is a waterfront in Copenhagen, Denmark, which runs along the Zealand side of the Inner Harbour from the Nyhavn canal in the south to the Nordre Toldbod area just south of Langelinie to the north. The name refers to a shipyard which used to occupy the grounds but is now more associated with emigration to America after it became a major hub for trans-Atlantic traffic later in the century. Today, the area is dominated by Amalienborg Palace with the Amalie Garden and a number of late 18th-century warehouses which have been converted to other uses. The buildings facing the waterfront have their address on the parallel street Toldbodgade.

== History ==
=== Warehouses and ship building ===
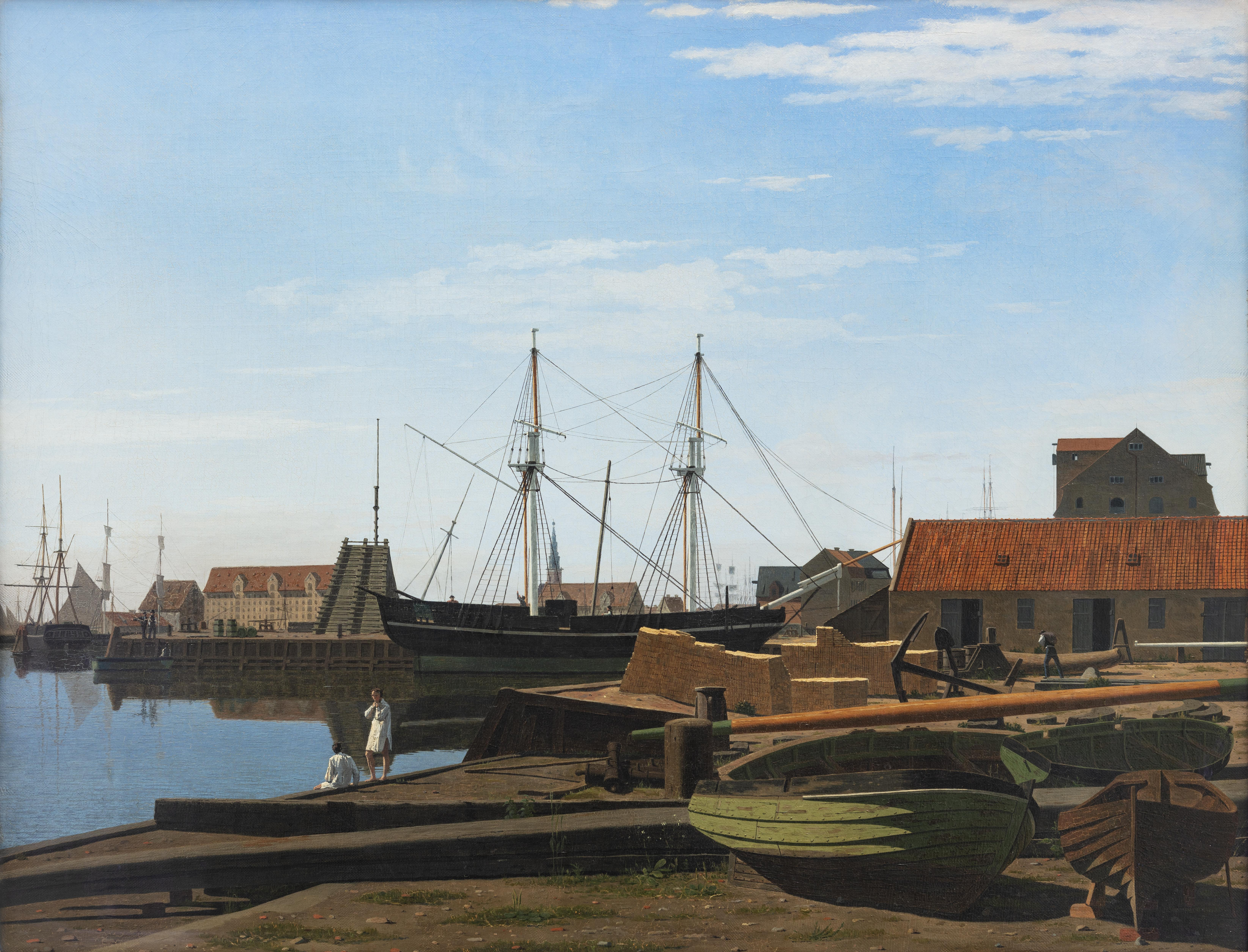
Larsen's Place painted by Carl Dahl in 1840

The waterfront was created by extensive land fills which led to the establishment of Ny Toldbodgade in 1719 and expanded the port northwards. The new quay was used for storage of timber that arrived to the city by ship.

When Frederiksstaden was founded and the area along the waterfront came under redevelopment as an elegant new residential district, it was decided to relocate the timberyards from the area due to the risk of fires. They found a temporary home at Greenland, a greenspace next to Nyboder, and were later moved to a filled site south of Lange Bridge, at present day Tietgensgade. However, in spite of the wealthy new neighbours, the waterfront remained in use for port activities,

In 1802, the site was acquired by a wealthy shipowner, Lars Larsen, who established a shipyard in the grounds which became known simply as Larsen's Place after its founder.

In 1844, when Larsen died, Larsens Plads was acquired by Jacob Holm, the owner of the largest shipping company in Denmark at the time as well as a shipyard on Christianshavn. He used Larsens Plads for repairing ships.

=== Trans-Atlantic hub ===
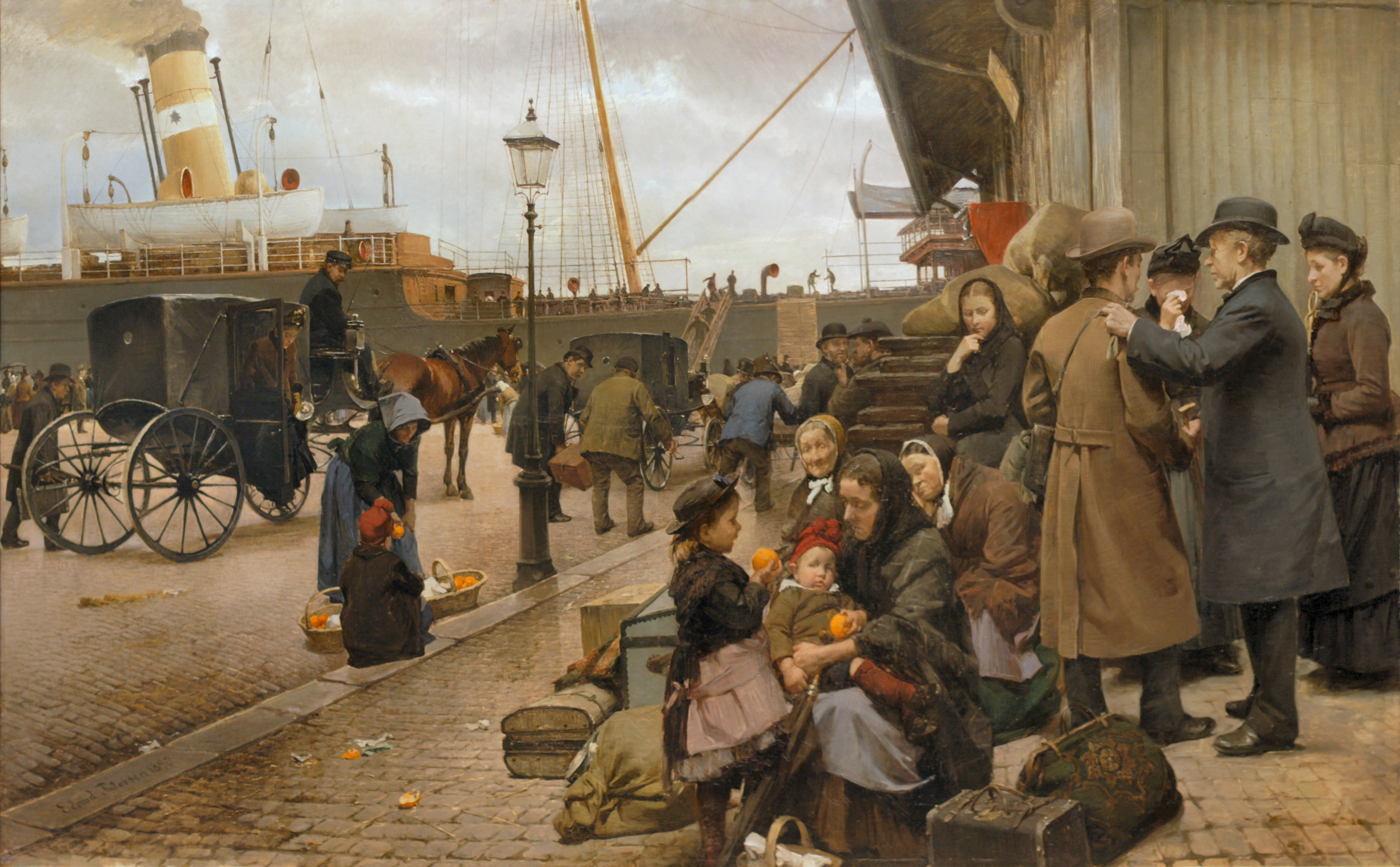
Emigrants at Larsens Plads, painting by Edvard Petersen from 1890

In 1870, the shipyard was closed and a new port terminal was established at the site in 1879 by the Thingvalla Line which began operating a direct route between Scandinavian ports and America, offering the growing number of Scandinavian emigrants affordable, comfortable and safe voyages. In 1898, the Thingvalla Line was acquired by DFDS, another Danish-based shipping company, and the Scandinavian-American passenger service was operated under the name Scandinavian America Line.

=== Later history ===
The route to America with Scandinavian America Line was discontinued in 1935. The quay area was later taken over by Oslo Ferries, which started in 1866 and have since relocated to the Free Port Terminal at Amerika Quay further north.

== Buildings ==
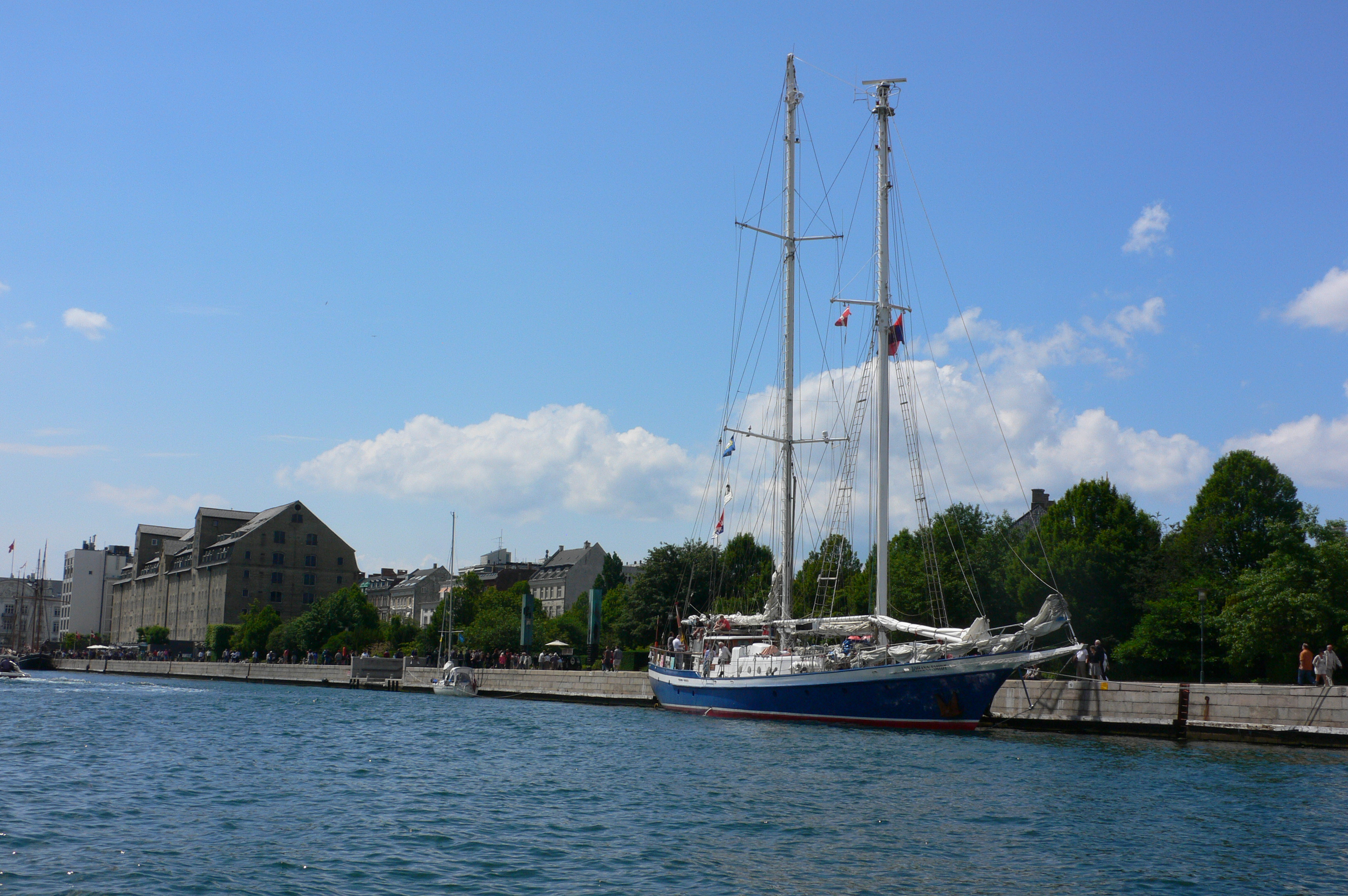
The southern end of Larsens Plads with the Double Warehouse

- West Indies Warehouse (1780–81)
- Blue Warehouse (1781–83)
- Yellow Warehouse (1777–78)
- Double Warehouse (granaries) (1785–87).

== Public art ==
An untitled sculpture by Søren Georg Jensen was installed at the quay in 1979. Outside the West India Warehouse is a replica of Michelangelo's David.

== See also ==
- Amerikabåt
- Amerika Plads
- Wilders Plads
