= Toldbodgade 12 =

Museum in Copenhagen, Denmark

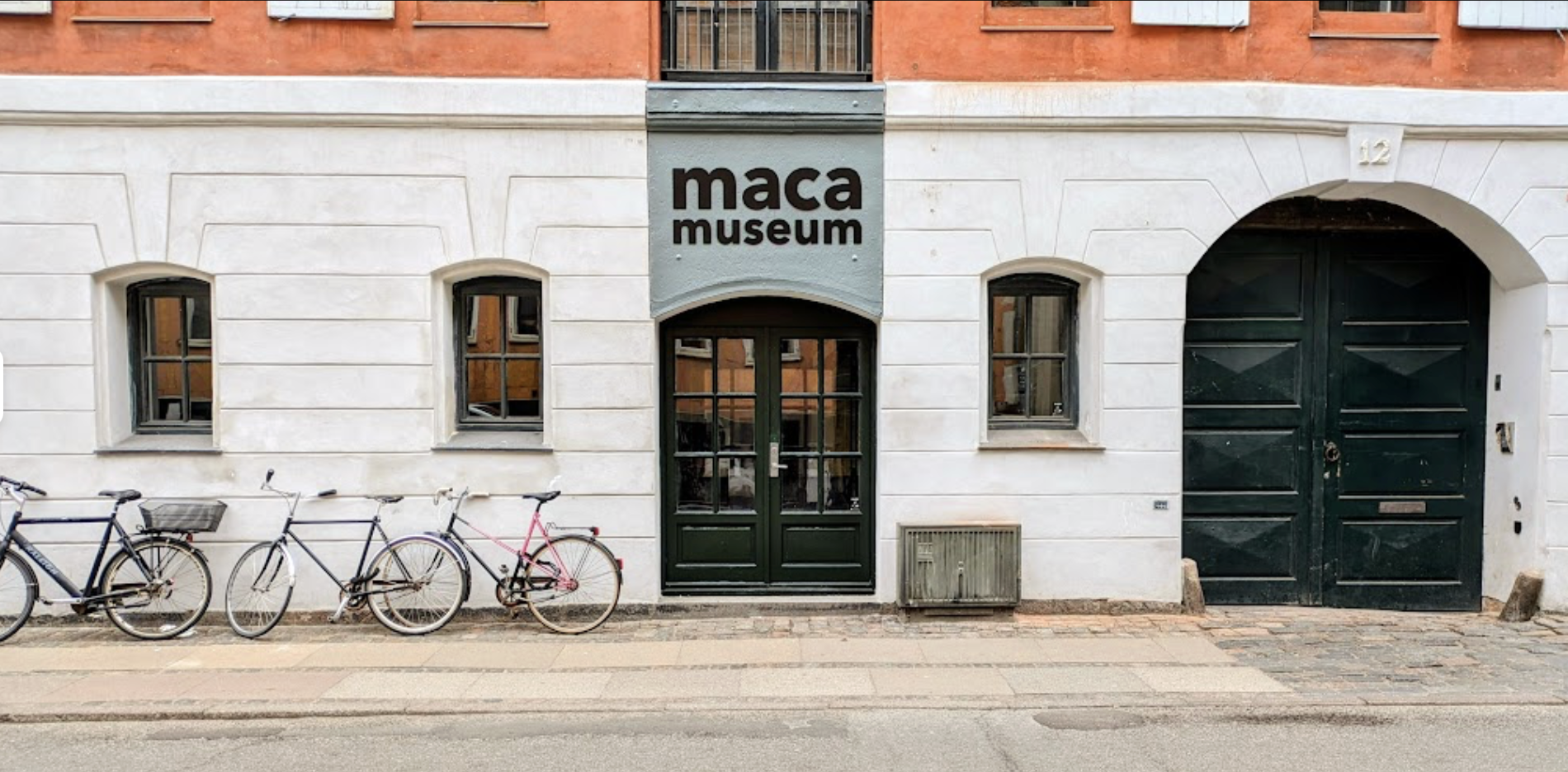
MACA Museum Copenhagen

Toldbodgade 12 is a protected building at Toldbodgade 12 in central Copenhagen, Denmark. The building is occupied by the Masters & Contemporary Art (MACA) Museum, the first independent fine art museum to open in Copenhagen since Louisiana Museum in 1958 by Knud W. Jensen. MACA Museum displays many of the greatest artists of the 20th and 21st centuries within the framework of exhibitions that span the history of fine art.

== History ==
The warehouse was built for the linen merchant grosserer Thøger Dyssel From (1744-1831) in 1807. The Danish architect Poul Kjærgaard's architectural firm was based in the building from 1964 to 1984. He was a professor at the Royal Danish Academy of Fine Arts' School of Architecture from 1953 to 1982. The building was listed by the Danish Heritage Agency in the Danish national registry of protected buildings in 1959.

== Architecture ==
The building consists of four storeys and is five bays wide. It has a one-bay wall dormer with the remains of metal hoists in the building's reception area. The windows have the original shutters.

The Danish toy manufacture Lego occupied part of Toldbodgade 12 as a workshop design studio during the late 20th century. The Danish Board of Technology Foundation has been based in the building. In 2017, the organization moved to Hvidovre. Previous tenants have included Better Collective and Yellowsunmedia.
