= Blue Warehouse =

The Blue Warehouse
- Det Blå Pakhus
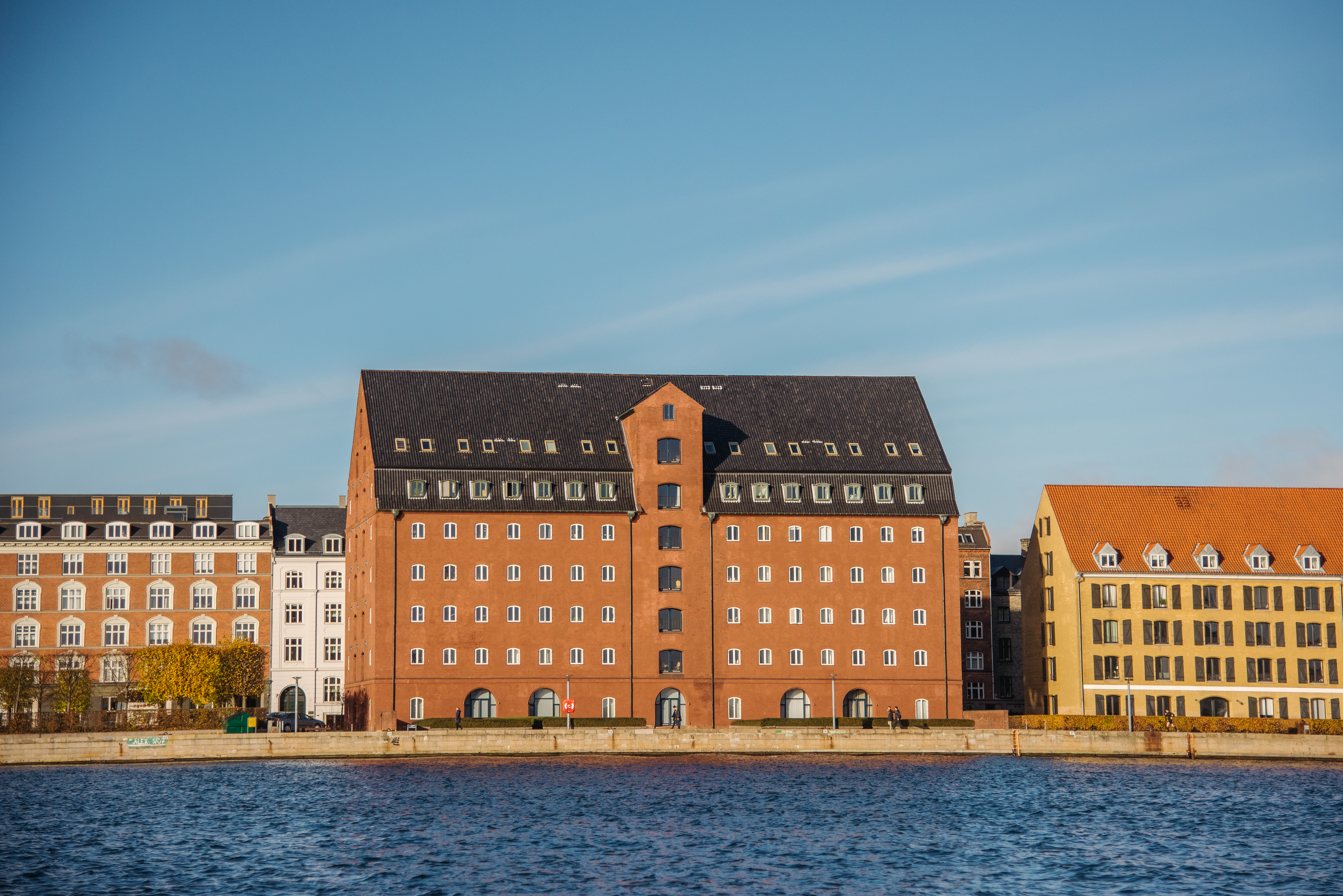
- The Blue Warehouse on the waterfront
- Interactive map of the The Blue Warehouse area

General information
- Architectural style: Neoclassical
- Location: Copenhagen, Denmark
- Coordinates: 55°41′06″N 12°35′47″E
- Construction started: 1781
- Completed: 1783
- Client: Baltic-Guinea Company

Design and construction
- Architect: Caspar Frederik Harsdorff

The Blue Warehouse (Danish: Det Blå Pakhus), is an 18th-century warehouse located at Toldbodgade 36 on the Larsens Plads waterfront in Copenhagen, Denmark. Completed in 1783 to the design of Caspar Frederik Harsdorff, it was converted into dwellings in the late 1970s.

== History ==
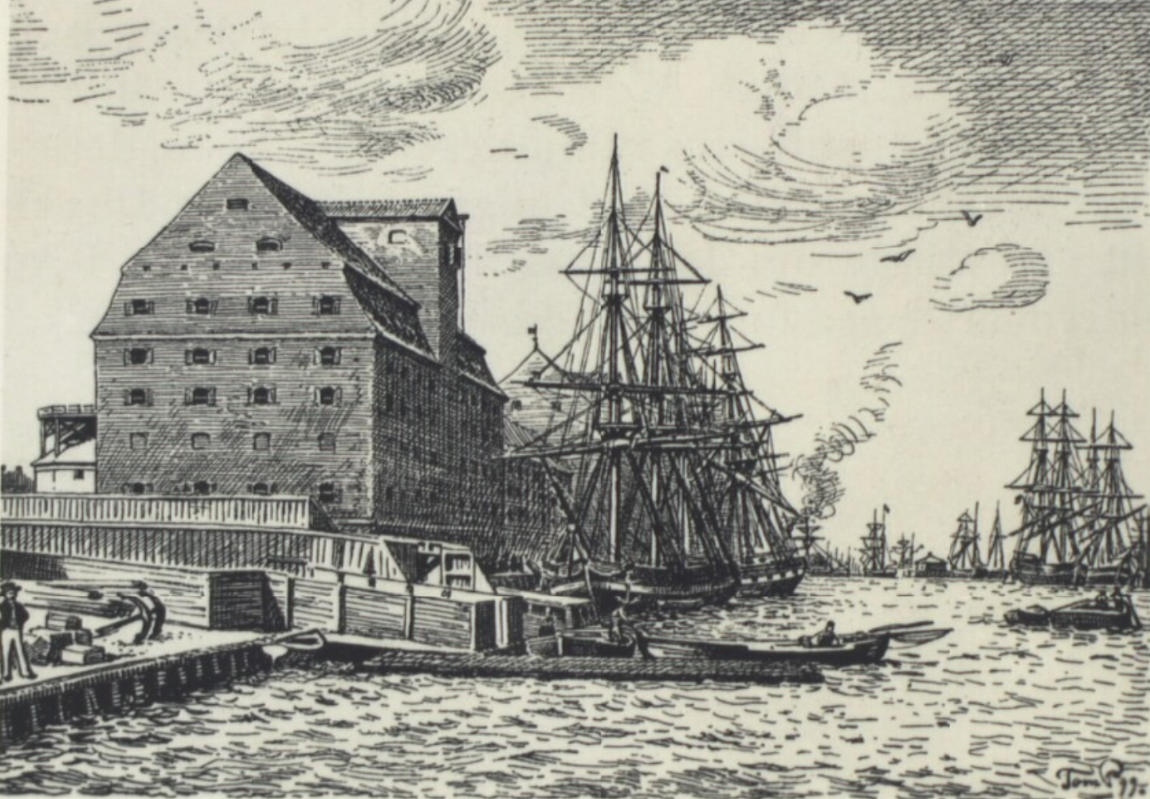
The Blue Warehouse in 1899

The warehouse was originally intended for Royal Greenland, a chartered company responsible for trade on Greenland, but prior to its completion it was ceded to the Baltic-Guinea Company which had just been founded. Designed by Caspar Frederik Harsdorff and built from 1781 to 1783, it was used for the storage of goods such as tobacco, sugar and cotton.

The Baltic-Guinea Company closed down after just five years. Later the warehouse came into use as a grain store.

The warehouse was listed in 1946. From 1978 to 1980 it was converted into condominiums by the architect Flemming Hertz (born 1936) and Ole Ramsgaard Thomsen (1937-2001).

== Today ==
The name is a reference to its appearance when it had a blue mansard roof and blue shutters. Today the shutters are red while the roof is blue.

== See also ==
- Yellow Warehouse
