= Admiral Hotel (Copenhagen) =

Hotel in Copenhagen, Denmark

Copenhagen Admiral Hotel
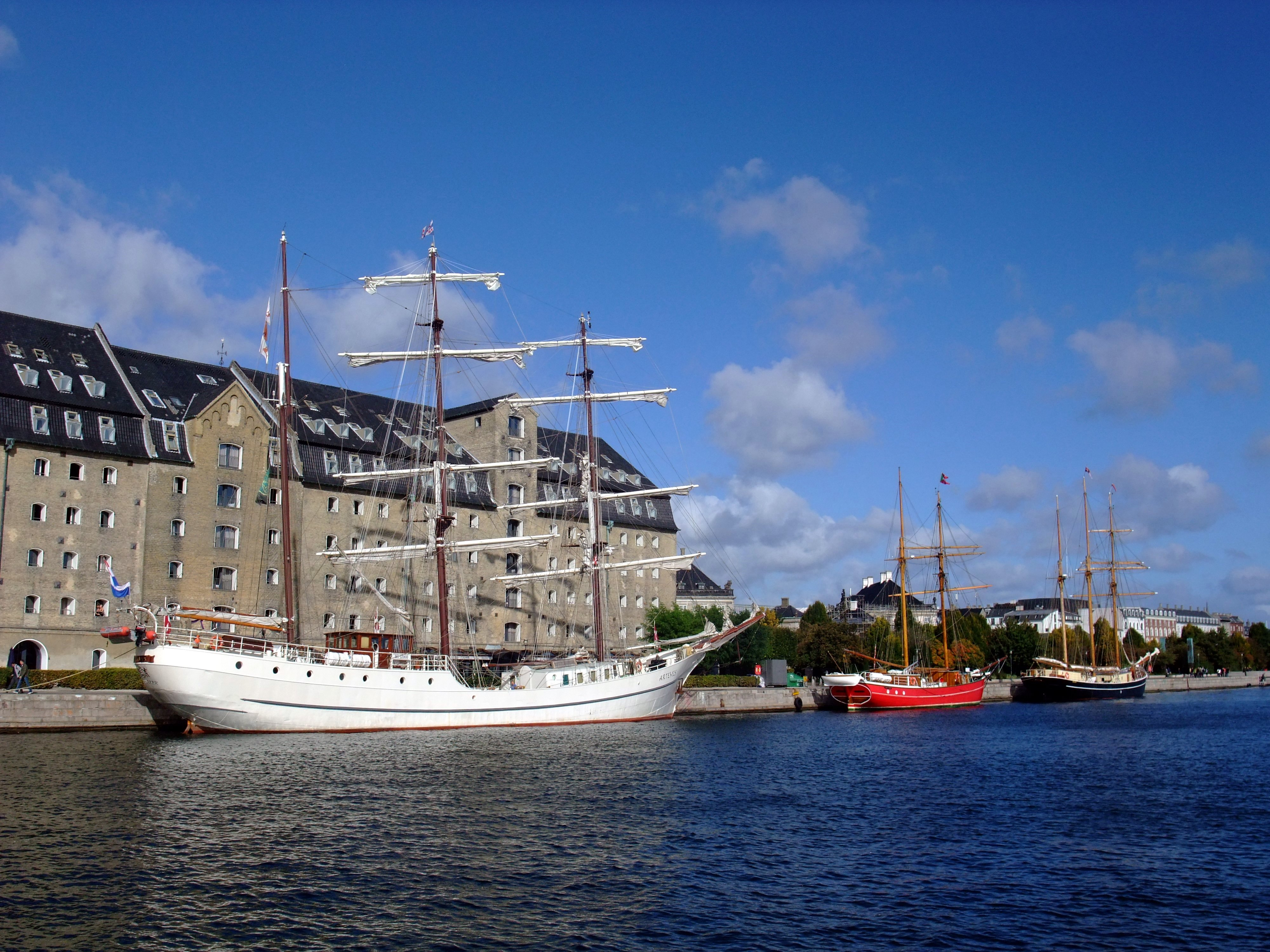
- Copenhagen Admiral Hotel

General information
- Location: 24-28 Toldbodgade, DK-1253 København K
- Coordinates: 55°40′55″N 12°35′38″E
- Completed: 1787
- Opening: 15 January 1978; 48 years ago

Dimensions
- Other dimensions: 105 metres (length)

Technical details
- Floor count: 6

Other information
- Number of rooms: 366

Admiral Hotel is a hotel in central Copenhagen, Denmark, located on the waterfront of the Inner Harbour between the mouth of the Nyhavn canal and the royal residence Amalienborg Palace. The building is a former warehouse.

== History ==
The building was originally two separate warehouses which were commissioned in 1781 for the newly chartered trading company, Østersøisk-Guineiske Handelskompagni which was established in 1781 and superseded by Pingel, Meyer, Prætorius & Co. The buildings were completed in 1787 to designs by engineering officer Ernst Peymann. They were taken over by the Crown in 1788 and then came into use as granaries. The two buildings were connected in 1885, creating the long building seen today. The building stored up to 30,000 barrels of grain.

The building was acquired by private investors in 1973 for redevelopment as a hotel. The architects Flemming Hertz and Ole Ramsgaard Thomsen undertook the conversion which was rewarded with an Europa Nostra diploma from the European Union. The hotel opened its doors in January 1978. It was refurbished in 2004.

== Today ==
The main entrance is on Toldbodgade. The hotel is surrounded by the Royal Playhouse and Sankt Annæ Plads to the south, Amalienborg to the west and Amalie Garden to the north.

The hotel has 366 rooms. It also contains conference facilities and SALT restaurant & bar which was designed by London-based Conran & Partner.

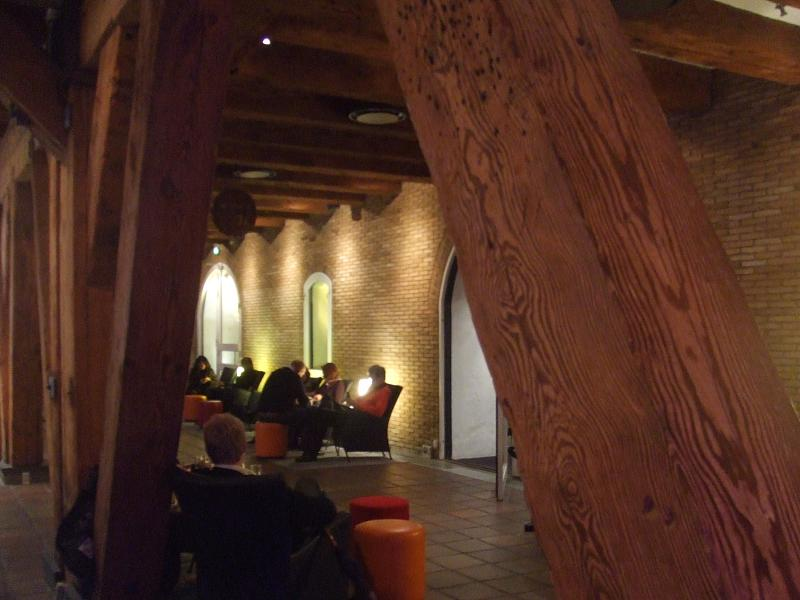
The lobby

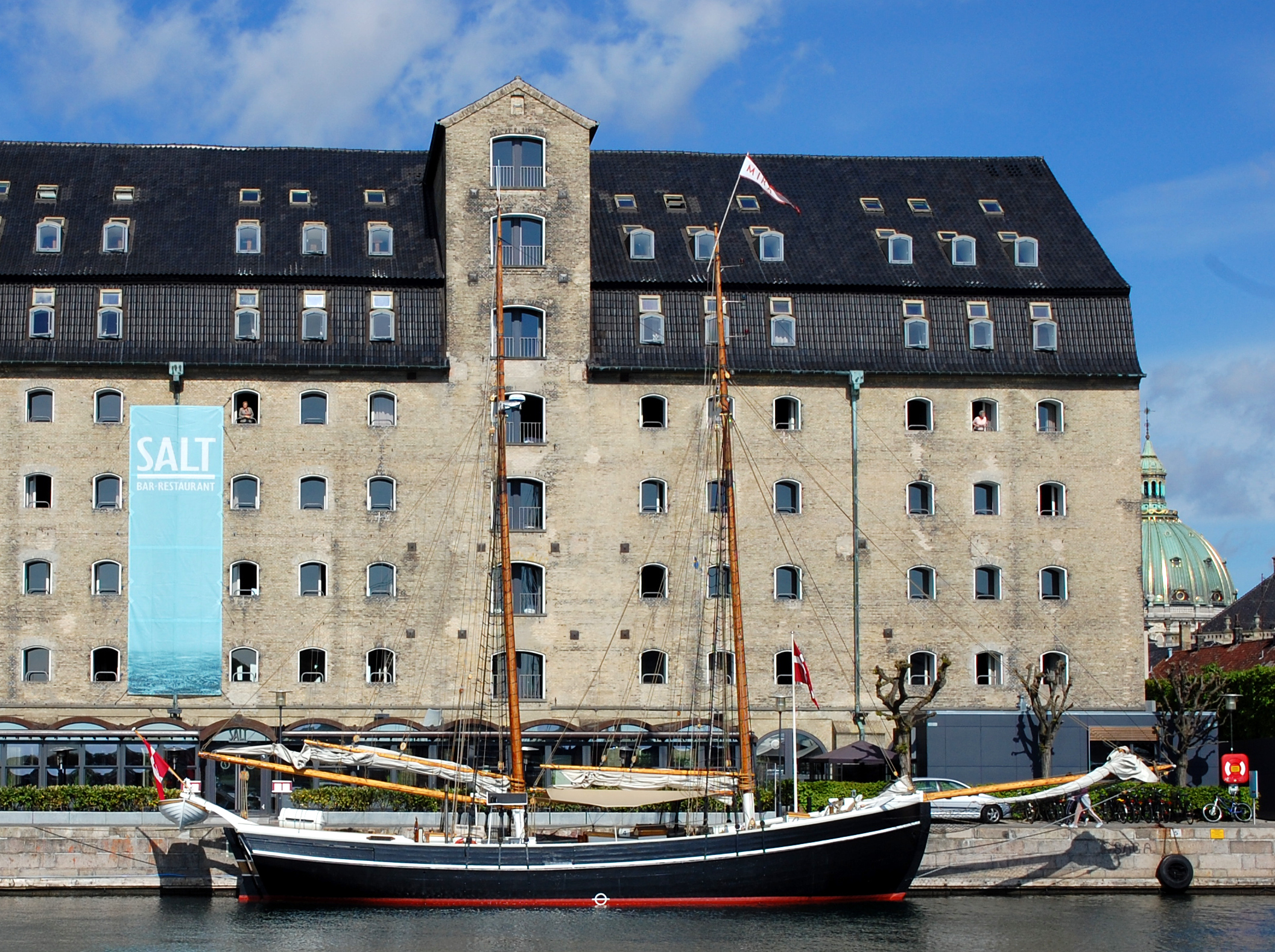
The hotel seen from the water

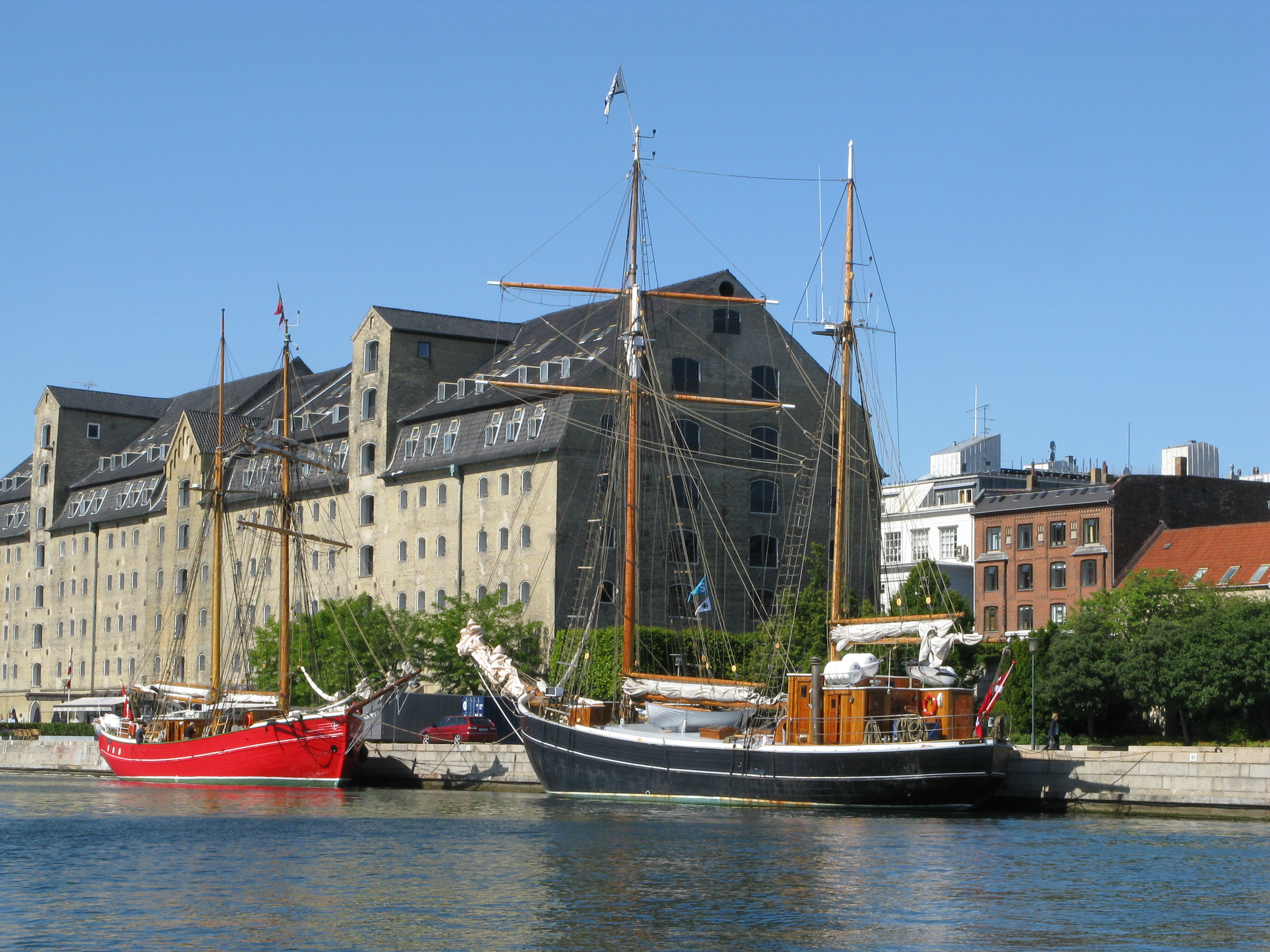
Copenhagen Admiral Hotel
