= Francesco Baratta the elder =

Francesco Baratta
- Born: 1590; Massa di Carrara
- Died: 1666 (aged 75–76); Rome
- Known for: Sculpture
- Movement: Baroque

Francesco Baratta the elder (c. 1590–1666) was an Italian sculptor of the Baroque period.

He was born in Massa di Carrara, and moved to Rome to work under Gian Lorenzo Bernini. He was one of many siblings, one of whom, Francesco, became an architect.

Bernini had him carve the bas-relief for the altar in the chapel of St Francis of Assisi made for the Marchese Raimondi di Savona for the chapel in San Pietro in Montorio.

The statue of the Rio della Plata in the Fontana dei Quattro Fiumi in Piazza Navona is attributed to Francesco. He completed a number of statues of Hercules, Lucrezia, and Cleopatra for the royal gallery of Dresden. His nephew, Giovanni Baratta was also a sculptor. Passeri describes him as imprudent and unruly in drinking and smoking, living without rules.
