= Vestindisk Pakhus =

Building in Copenhagen, Denmark

Coordinates: 55.6862°N 12.5973°E

West India Warehouse
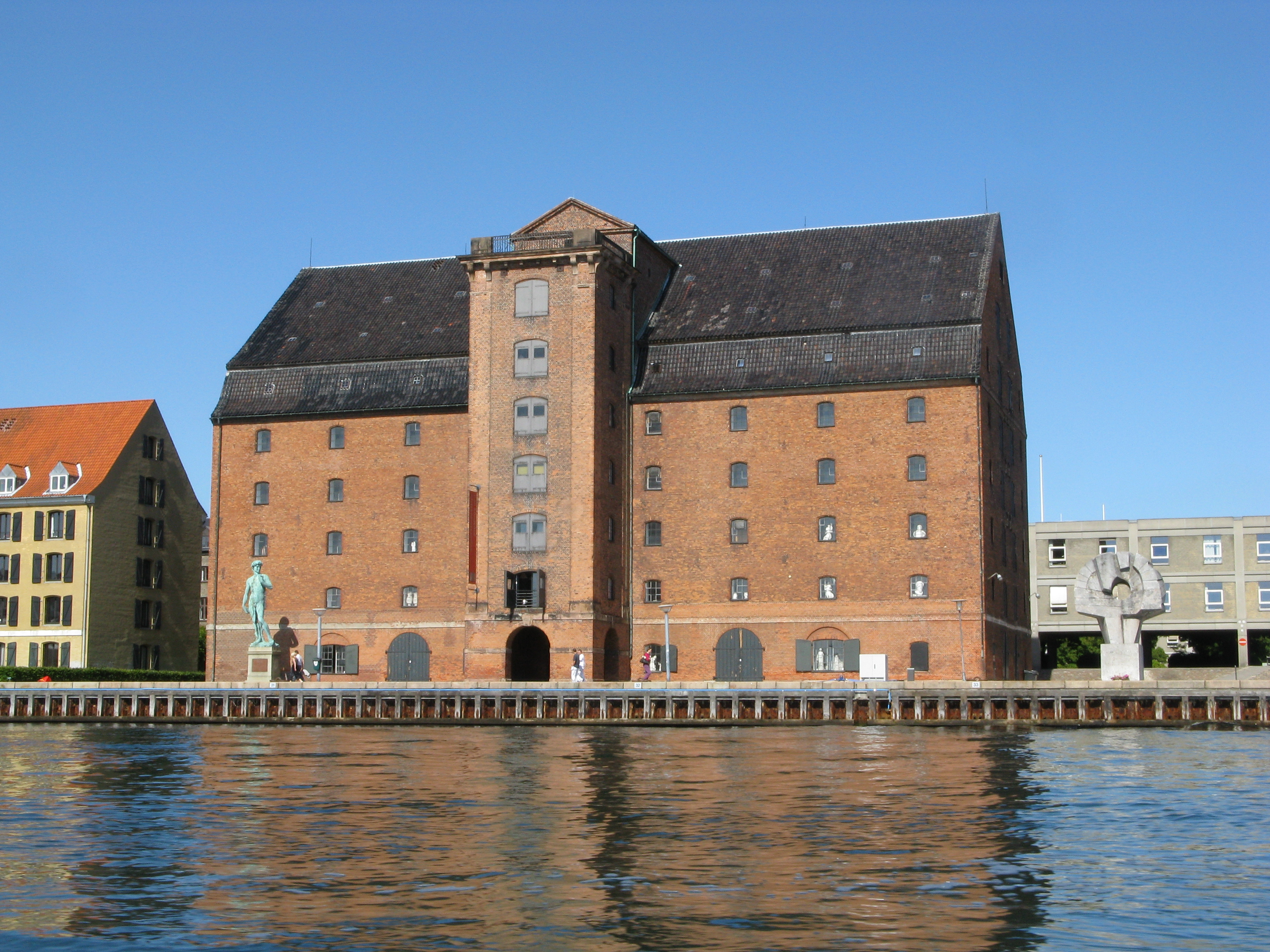
- West India Warehouse seen from the water
- Interactive map of the West India Warehouse area

General information
- Architectural style: Neoclassical
- Location: Copenhagen, Denmark
- Construction started: 1780
- Completed: 1781
- Client: Danish West India Company

Design and construction
- Architect: Caspar Frederik Harsdorff

Vestindisk Pakhus (English: West India Warehouse), located on Toldbodgade on the waterfront between Amalienborg Palace and Langelinie, is a former 18th-century warehouse in Copenhagen, Denmark. It was designed by Caspar Frederik Harsdorff and built from 1780 to 1781 for the Danish West India Company, a chartered company responsible for trade on the Danish West Indies. Today it houses the Royal Cast Collection, part of the Danish National Gallery, and a display of costumes from the Royal Danish Theatre.

== The King's Room ==
The King's Room (Danish: Kongeværelset) is located on the eighth floor of the warehouse and is the former meeting room of the trade commission which managed the West India Company. The wallpaper depicts guava leaves and fruits which were imported from the West Indies. The room also contain a set of 12 original chairs, believed to have been designed by Harsdorff for the room.

The name of the room originates from a story which has it that on 2 April 1801 King Frederick VI followed the Battle of Copenhagen from the room. However, no documentation exists and it would have been impossible to see anything but smoke from the position.

== Displays ==
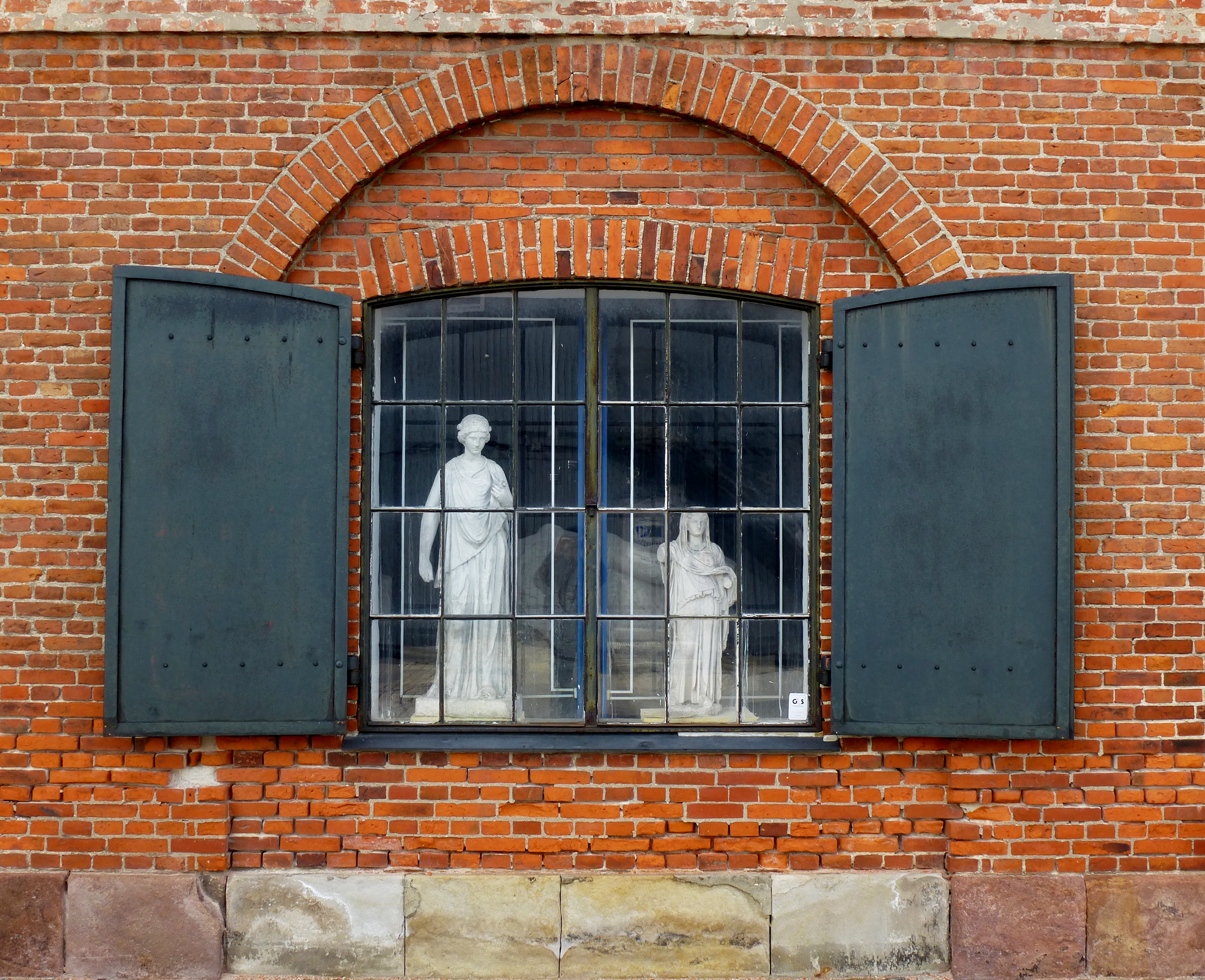
Statues viewed through a window

The three lower floors are dedicated to the Royal Cast Collection which exhibits more than 2,000 plaster casts of sculptures and reliefs from museums, temples, churches, and public places around the world. The upper floors display costumes from the Royal Danish Theatre.

Admission to the building is free (open on Tuesdays and Sundays).

== See also ==
- Det Blå Pakhus
