= San Ferdinando, Livorno =

Church building in Livorno, Italy

Coordinates: 43.5541°N 10.3052°E

San Ferdinando is a Baroque style, Roman Catholic church located in Venezia Nuova district next to Piazza del Luogo Pio in Livorno, region of Tuscany, Italy. It is also called San Ferdinando Re or the Church of the Crocetta. Nearby is the deconsecrated church of Sant'Anna.

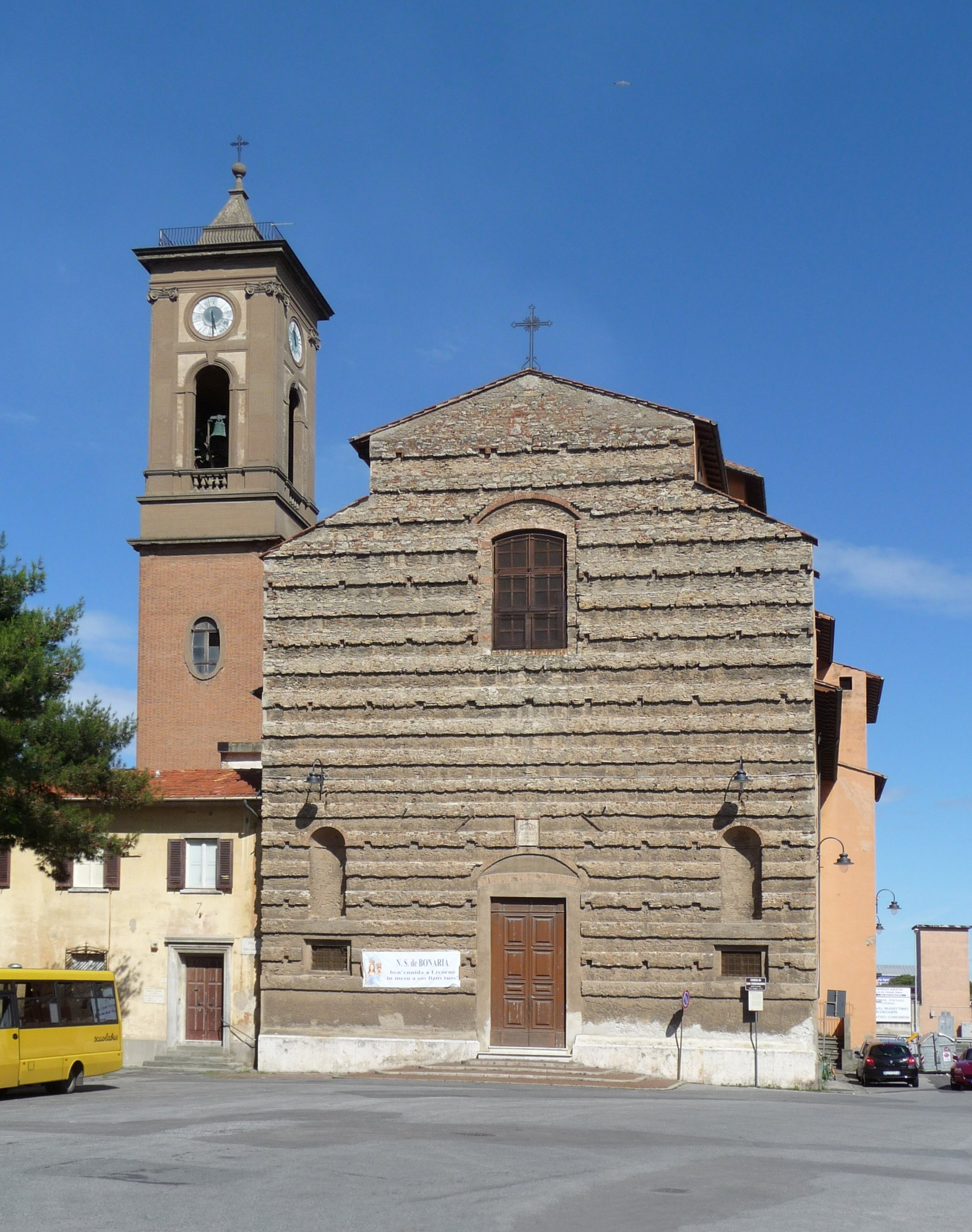
The church of San Ferdinando

== History ==
In 1653, the mendicant Trinitarian Father Francesco di San Lorenzo, who recurrently traveled to Tunisia to redeem Christian slaves, instituted in the Livornese neighborhood of Venezia Nuova a Congregation dedicated to this purpose of ransoming Christians in the North African Muslim states, called the Compagnia della Natività della Madonna (Confraternity of the Birth of the Virgin). The Trinitari, after over a decade in Livorno, in 1667 built a small convent and oratory, at the site of a former chapel dedicated to the birth of the Virgin and Mary's mother. The confraternity was ultimately aggregated to a Roman confraternity dedicated to the same purpose.

By the 19th-century this structure was at risk of collapsing and razed. Construction of the church of San Ferdinando was commissioned by the early 1707 under designs of Giovanni Battista Foggini, and completed nearly ten years later by Giovanni del Fantasia. The church was dedicated to St Ferdinand, King of Castille, the medieval scourge of Al-Andalus, in part to recognize the initial patronage of Prince Ferdinando, son of Granduke Cosimo III. However, the death of Ferdinado in 1713, forced the Trinitarians to raise further money for its construction. The church was consecrated in November 1717 and was restored after the 1742 and 1824 earthquakes. The exterior facade is plain without marble sheathing; the interior, however, is highly decorated in a baroque style.

== Interior ==
The layout is that of a Latin cross. The masterpiece inside the church is the main altar's sculptural group depicting the Liberated Slaves by Giovanni Baratta, depicting an angel with one liberated and one still chained slave.

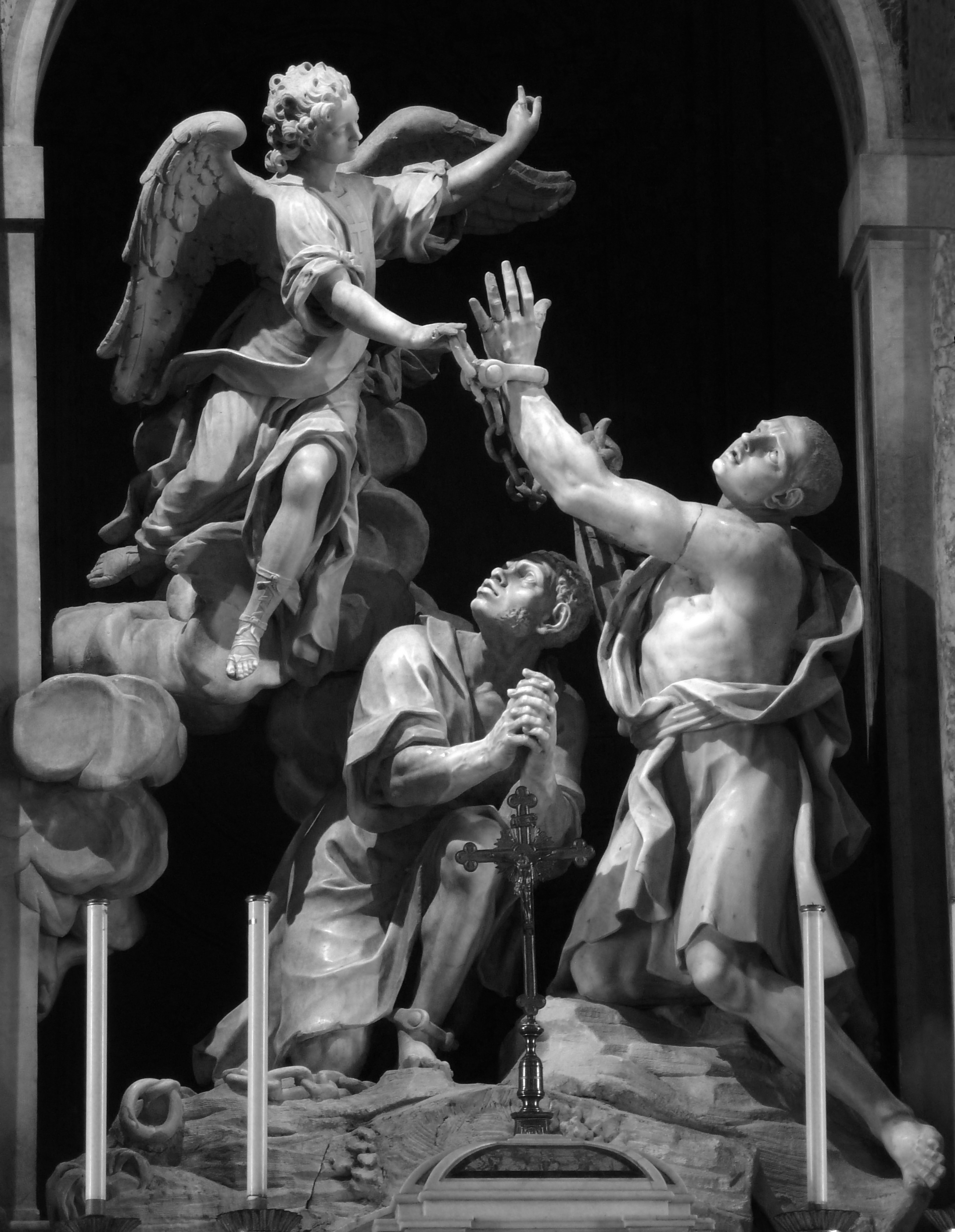
Main altar: Liberated Slaves by Giovanni Baratta.

The church has two chapels on each side. The first altar on right is dedicated to the Blessed Giovan Battista della Concezione dei Trinitari. The second on the right is dedicated to the canonized founders of the order Giovanni di Matha and Felice, the priest Giovanni Cibri di Carrara. It has sculpted reliefs of the Saints in adoration of Holy Trinity. The chapel at the crossing, dedicated to Jesus the Nazarene, houses a wooden statue resembles that found in a Trinitarian church of Madrid, rescued in 1681 from Morocco. The marble statuary on the main altar was sculpted by Giovanni Baratta, depicts an angel appearing to John of Matha, displaying at his feet a freed Christian slave and a chained moorish slave.

Another chapel is dedicated Madonna del Buon Rimedio (Our Lady of Good Remedy), Marian devotion held by Trinitarians and Matha in particular reverence. Over the doors of the crossing, four oval bas-reliefs depict the cardinal virtues, on the main altar are statues of Faith and Hope. The English aristocrat Peter Yarvis of Sandwich endowed a chapel in 1720; in memory of his namesake, the altar has a marble relief depicting St Peter receives the Keys from Christ. The last chapel has a canvas of San Michele dei Santi. The pilaster niches houses statues of canonized Kings (first four in marble; latter two, stucco): Ferdinand III of Castile, Henry II, Holy Roman Emperor of Germany; Louis IX of France; Edward the Confessor of England; Leopold III, Margrave of Austria; and Casimir of Poland.

Suppressed by Napoleon in 1808, the parish remained without clerics till 1848. In August 1853, the trinitarians re-acquired the parish and convent. It later became an elementary school. During the Second World War, the Venezia Nuova district was heavily bombed, and the church suffered destruction of the bell-tower and some chapels, but underwent reconstruction.

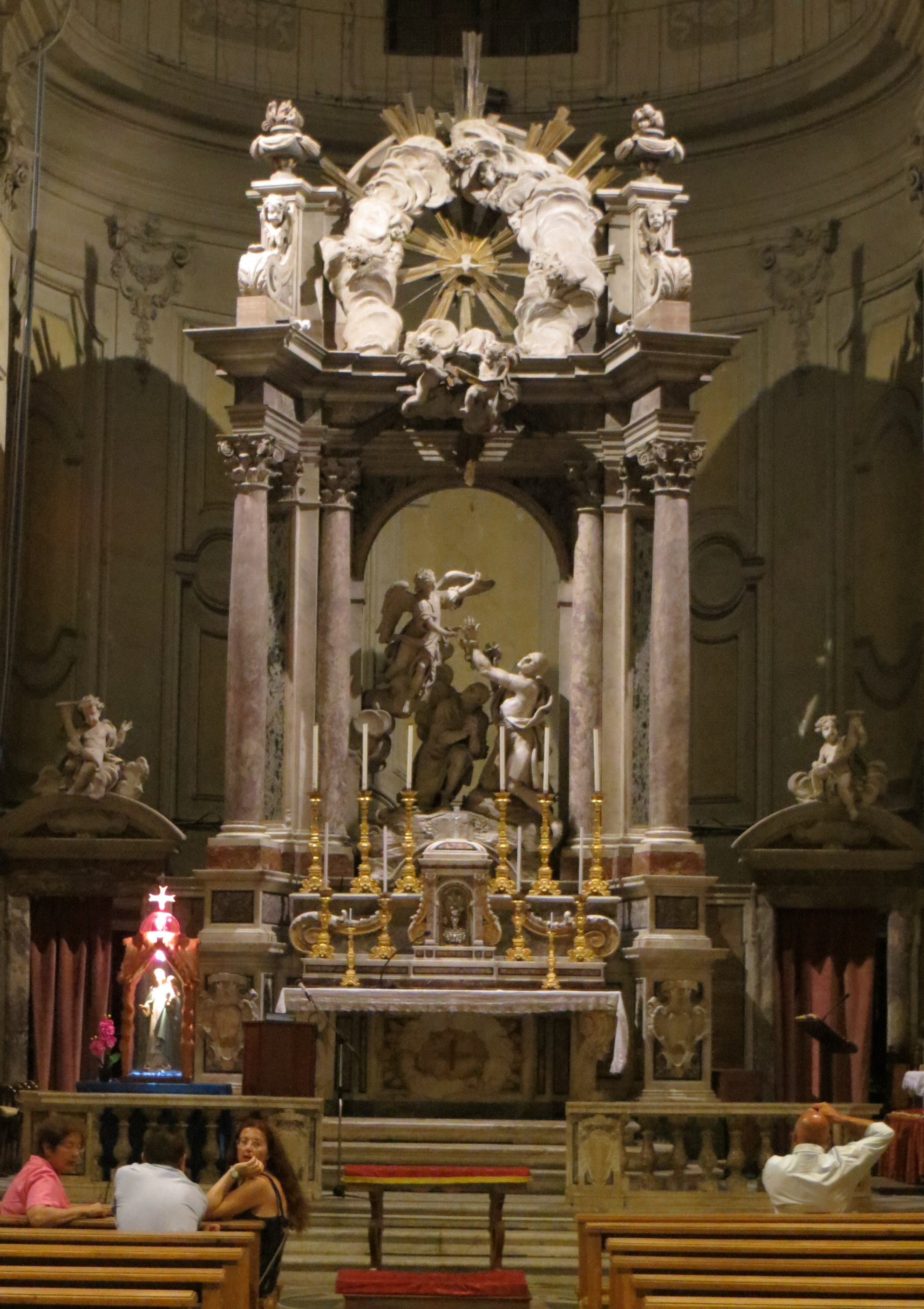
Main Altar

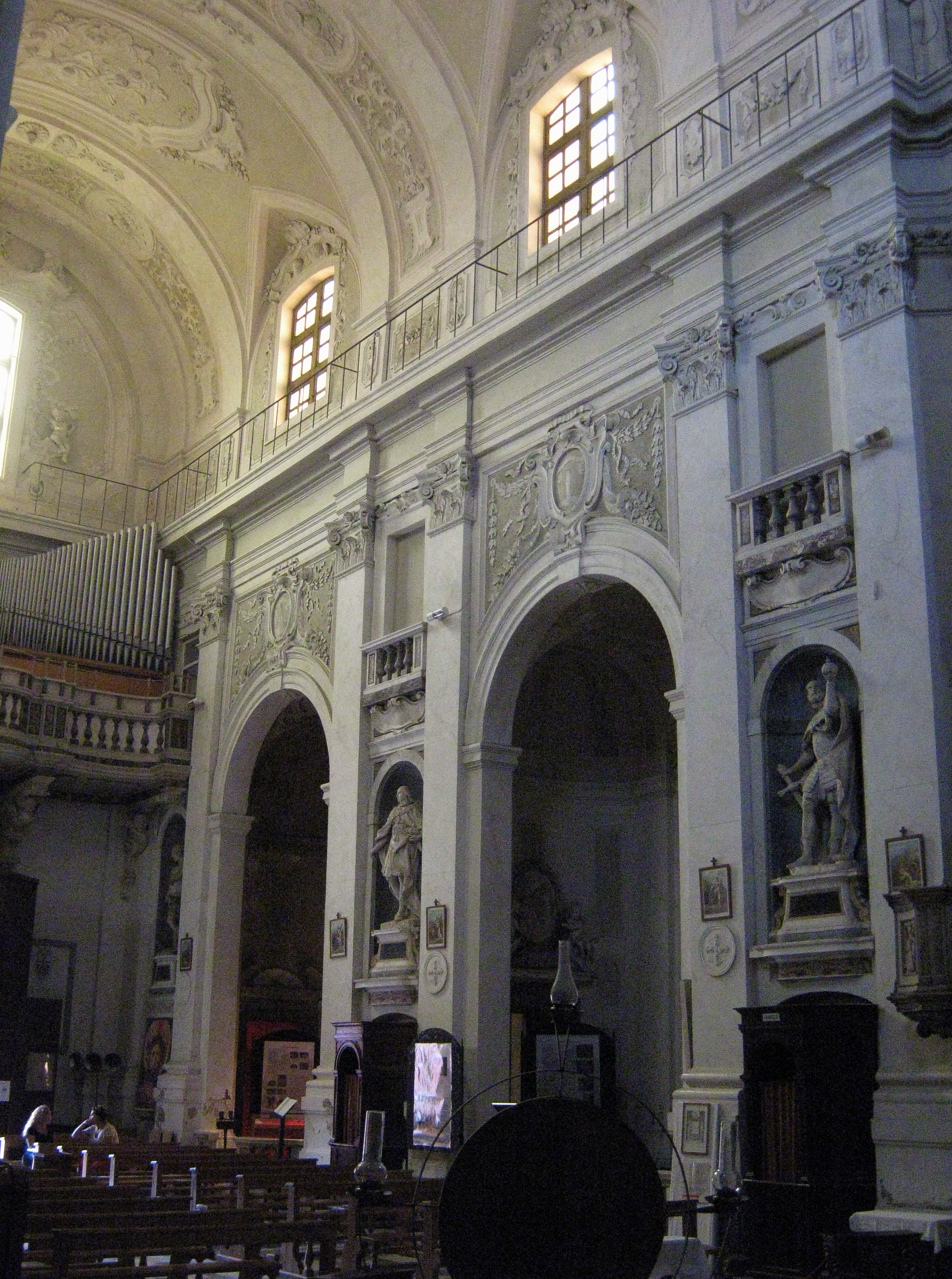
Interior of church
