= Hercules Pavilion =

Building in Copenhagen, Denmark

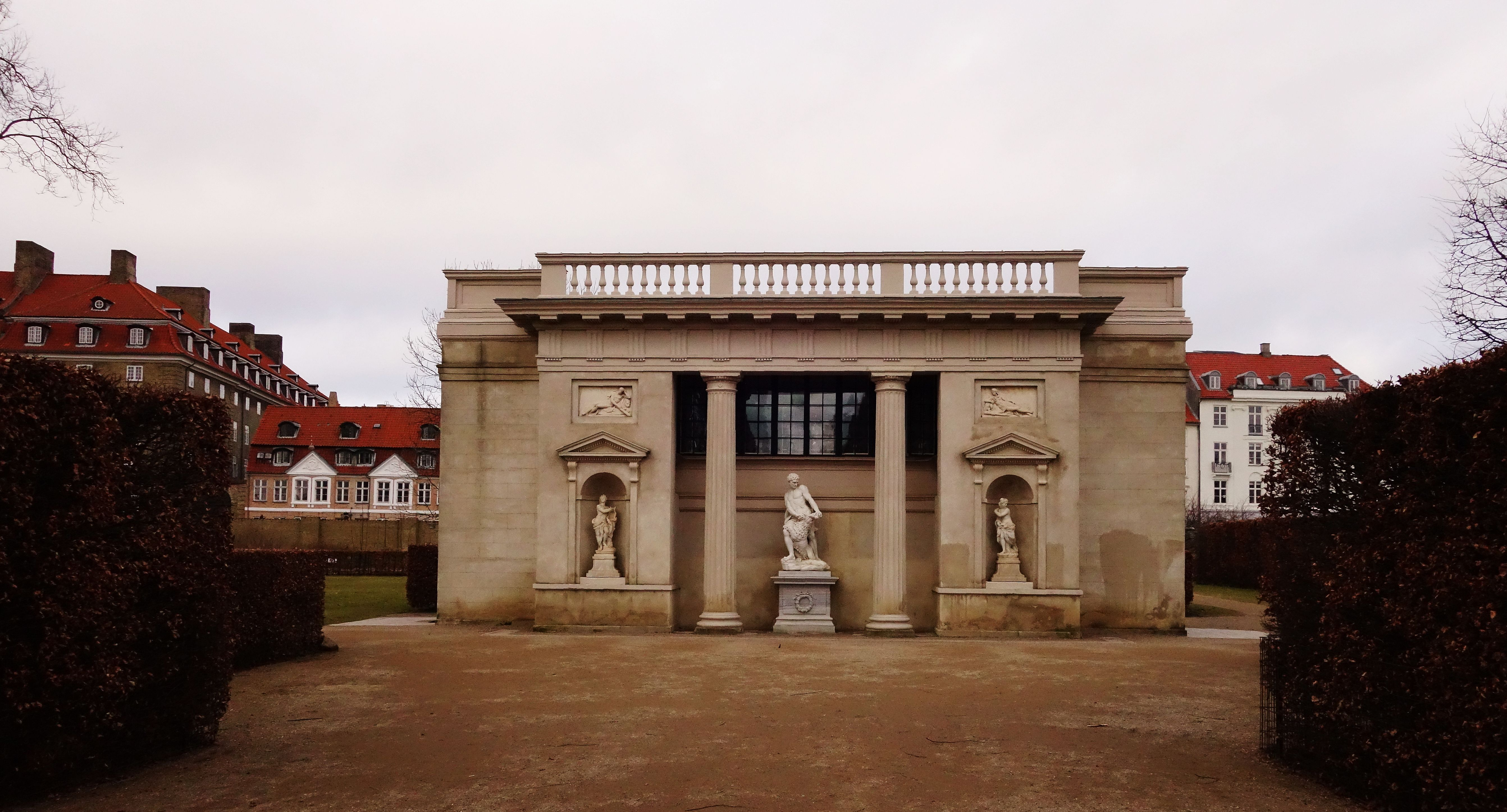
- Interactive map of the Hercules Pavilion area

General information
- Architectural style: Neoclassical
- Location: Copenhagen, Denmark
- Coordinates: 55°41′10.5″N 12°34′49.5″E
- Construction started: 1006
- Completed: c. 1607 (original); 1773 (adapted)
- Client: Christian IV (original)

Design and construction
- Architect: Caspar Frederik Harsdorff

The Hercules Pavilion (Danish: Herkulespavillonen) is a former royal pavilion now operated as a café in Rosenborg Castle Gardens in central Copenhagen, Denmark. Its history dates back to the foundation of the park in 1606 but it was adapted to its current Neoclassical style by Caspar Frederik Harsdorff in 1773 after the gardens had been opened to the public. The pavilion takes its name from a statue of Hercules positioned in a deep niche in its facade. The sculpture was created by the Italian sculptor Giovanni Baratta from whom it was acquired by King Frederik IV during his visit to Italy.

== History ==
=== The Hermitage ===
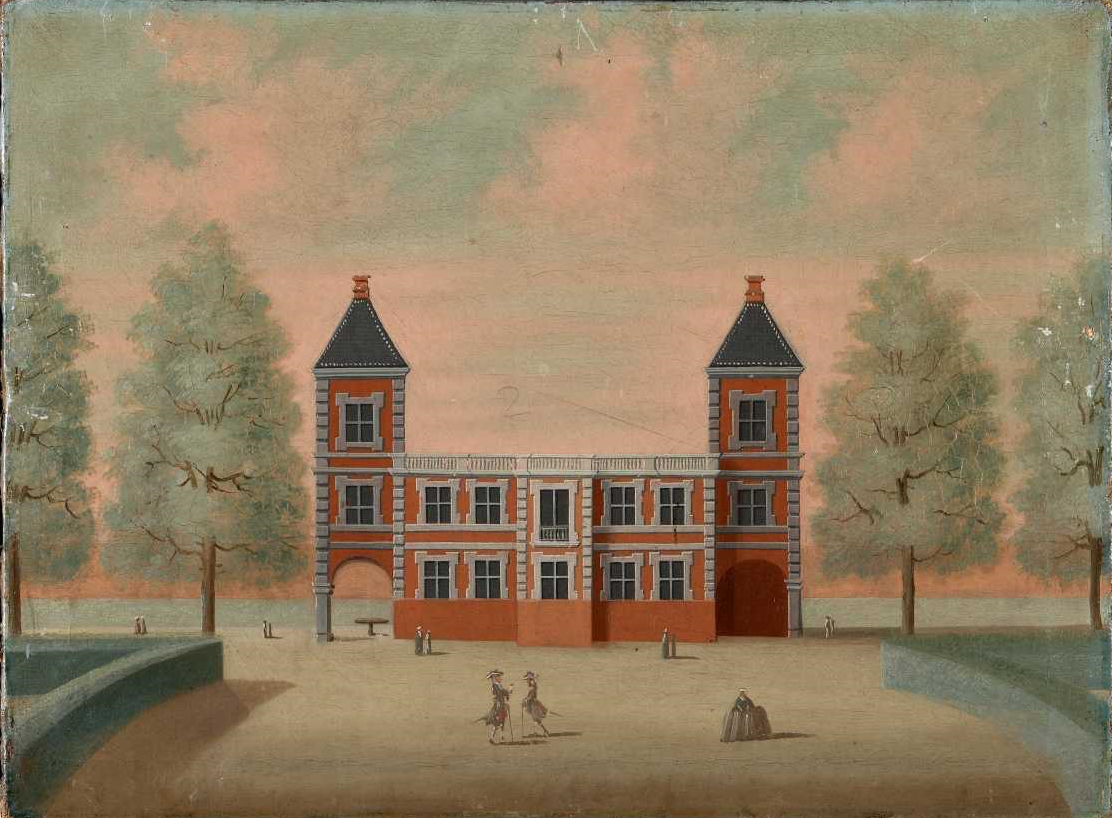
Rendering for the pavilion

Then known as the Blue Pavilion, the pavilion was originally built by King Christian IV in connection with the foundation of the gardens in 1606. As at Rosenborg Castle, it was built with concealed sound ducts which allowed the king and his guests to listen to music in privacy on the first floor while the orchestra played on the floor below.

In 1671, King Christian V converted the pavilion into a hermitage, a place where the royal family could dine in the absence of servants. An elegant kitchen with Dutch tiles on the walls and floor was installed on the lower floor. Here the table was set and then hoisted up to the first floor through a hatch.

From about 1710, after Frederiksberg Palace had been built, Rosenborg Castle, as well as its gardens, was largely abandoned by the royal family. The gardens were opened to the public but the Hermitage gradually fell into a state of disrepair.

=== The Hercules Pavilion ===
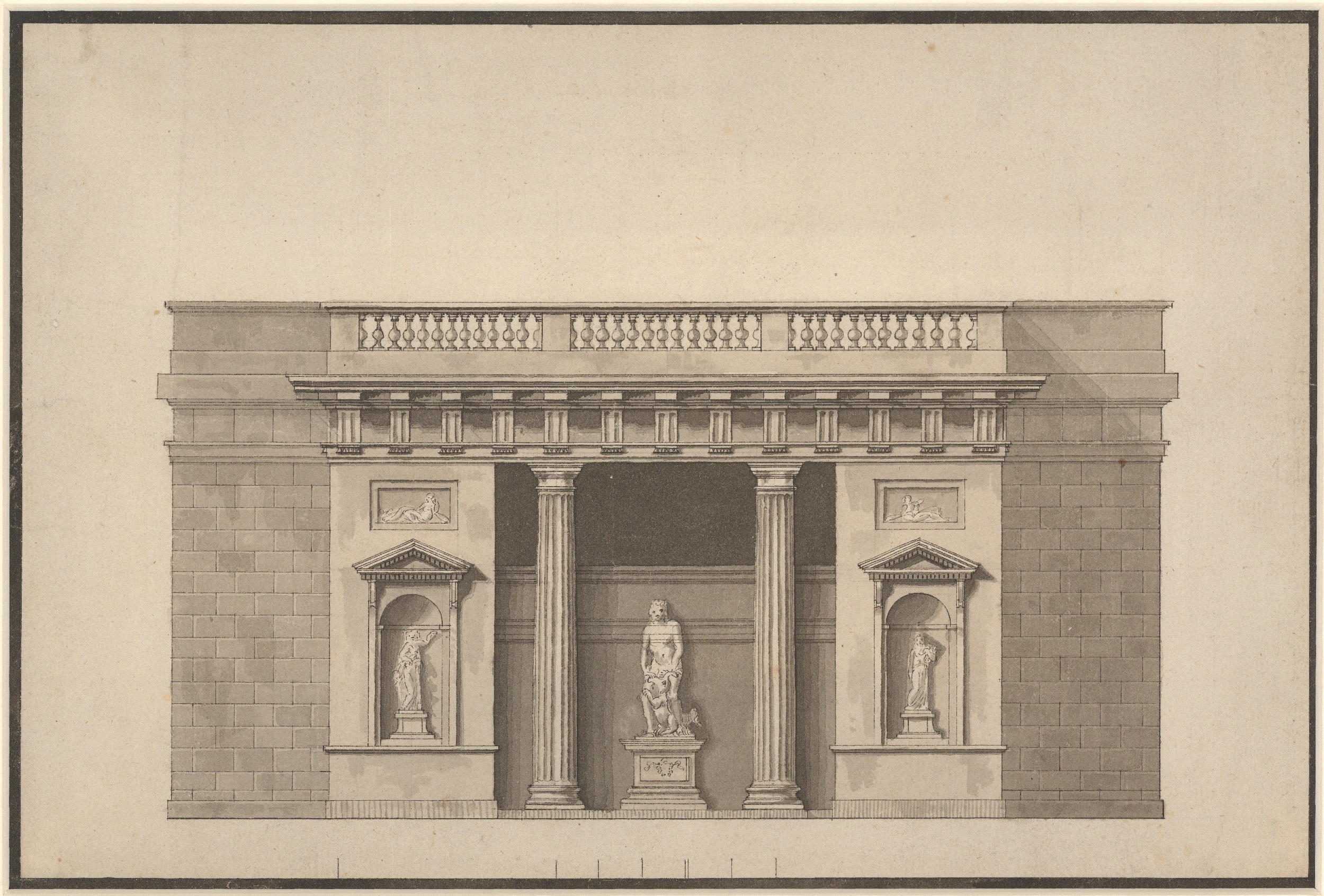
Rendering for the pavilion

In 1773, after it had been decided to renovate the neglected gardens, Caspar Frederik Harsdorff was commissioned to redesign the pavilion. He introduced the current design with the niches and the statues which gave rise to its current name. Towards the end of the century, a small ale house opened in the pavilion and in 1810 confectioner H. C. Firmenich received a licence to serve tea, punch, lemonade and other refreshments to the garden's visitors. The Swiss confectioner also baked sweet pretzels and occasionally there was entertainment on the roof terrace.

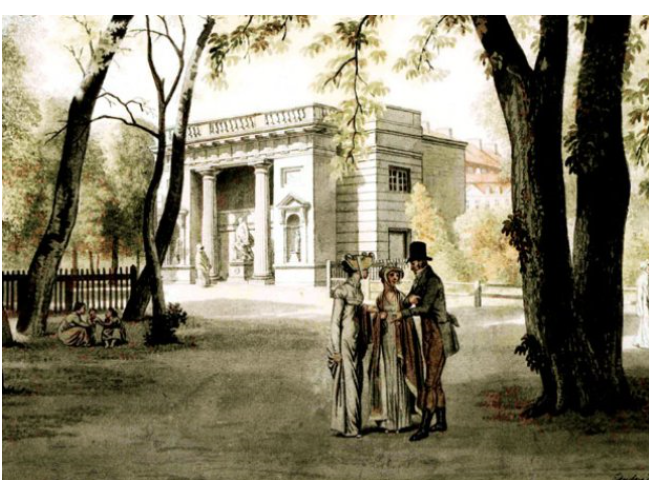
Painting by Exkersberg from 1809

Around 1840, the popularity of the gardens experienced a boost when Georg Carstensen and composer Hans Christian Lumbye of Tivoli Gardens fame became responsible for entertainment at the pavilion.

In the 20th century the pavilion was used as residence for the head gardener, and later as a storeroom by a folk dancing club.

== Architecture and statues ==
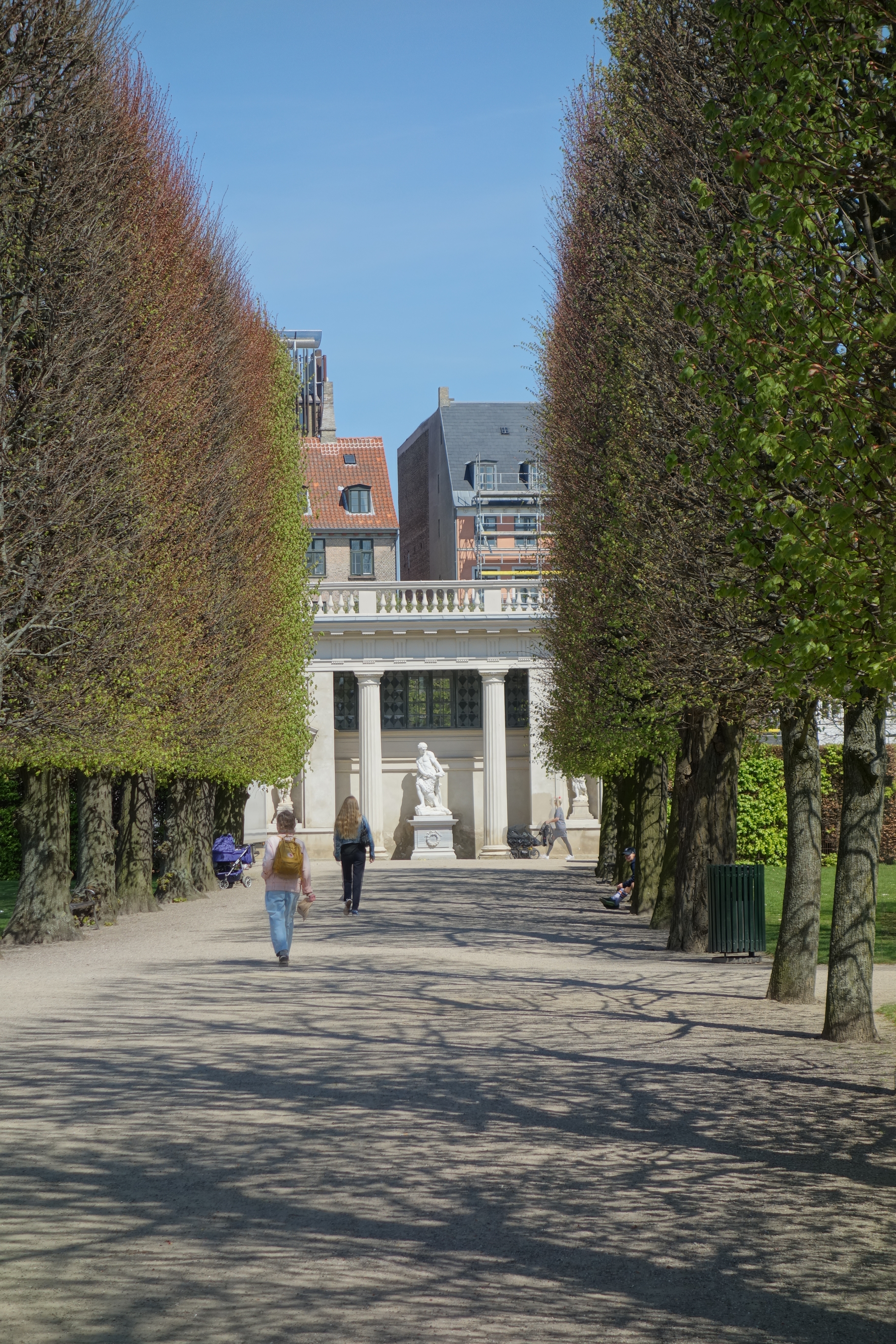
The Hercules Pavilion

The Hercules Pavilion is built in Neoclassical style. The facade is dominated by Giovanni Baratta's statue of Hercules from which it takes its name, which is located in a deep niche flanked by Tuscan columns and two smaller niches with statues of Orpheus and Eurydice, also designed by Baratta and brought home by Frederick IV.

== The Hercules Pavilion today ==
In 1999 the pavilion was refurbished once again and converted back into Café Herkules, which combines a café on the ground floor with facilities for cultural activities on the first floor.
