= Giovanni Baratta =

Italian sculptor

- Born: 1670; Carrara
- Died: 1747 (aged 76–77)
- Known for: Sculpture
- Movement: Baroque

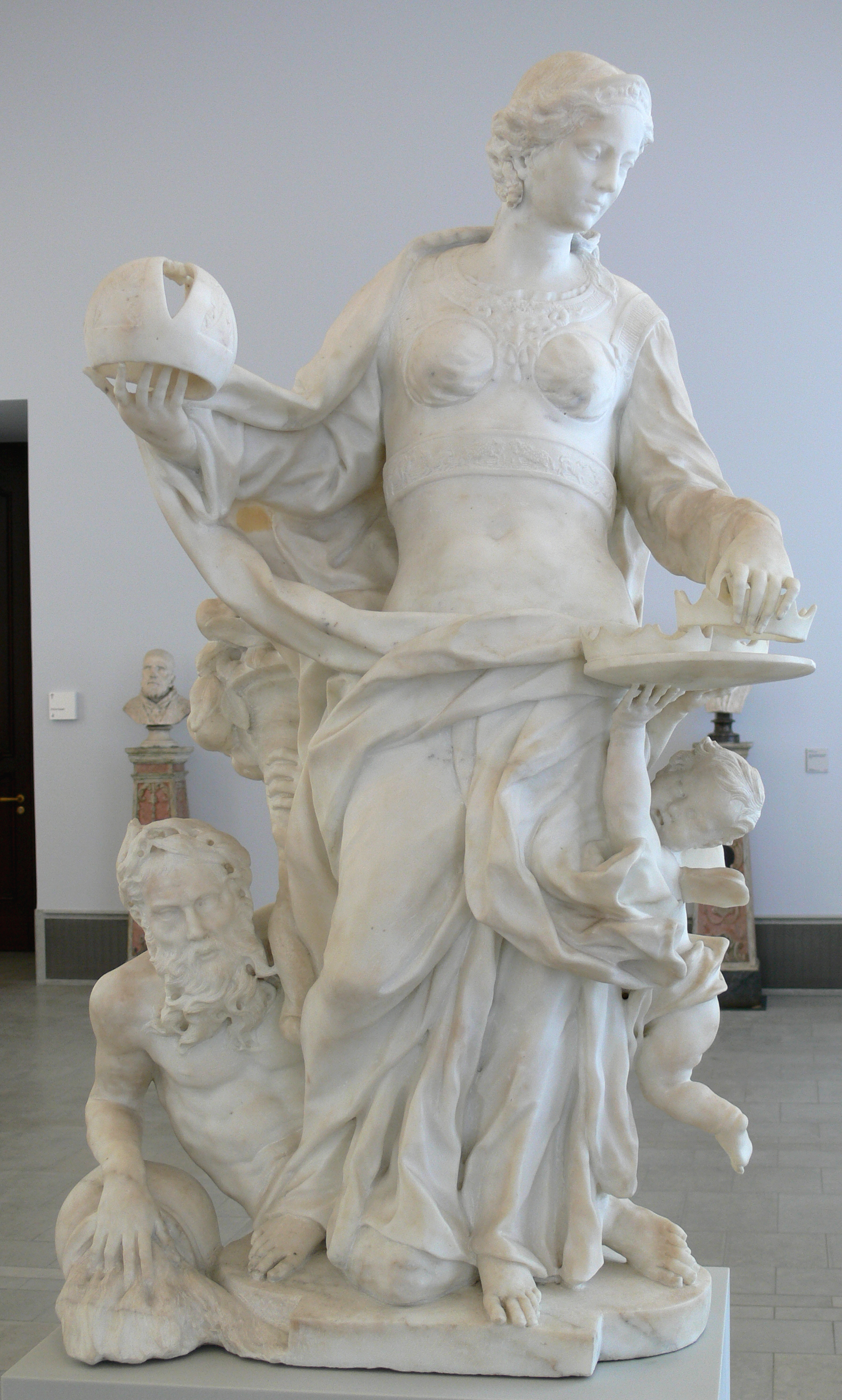
Giovanni Baratta: Allegory of Lombardy (Bode-Museum, Berlin)

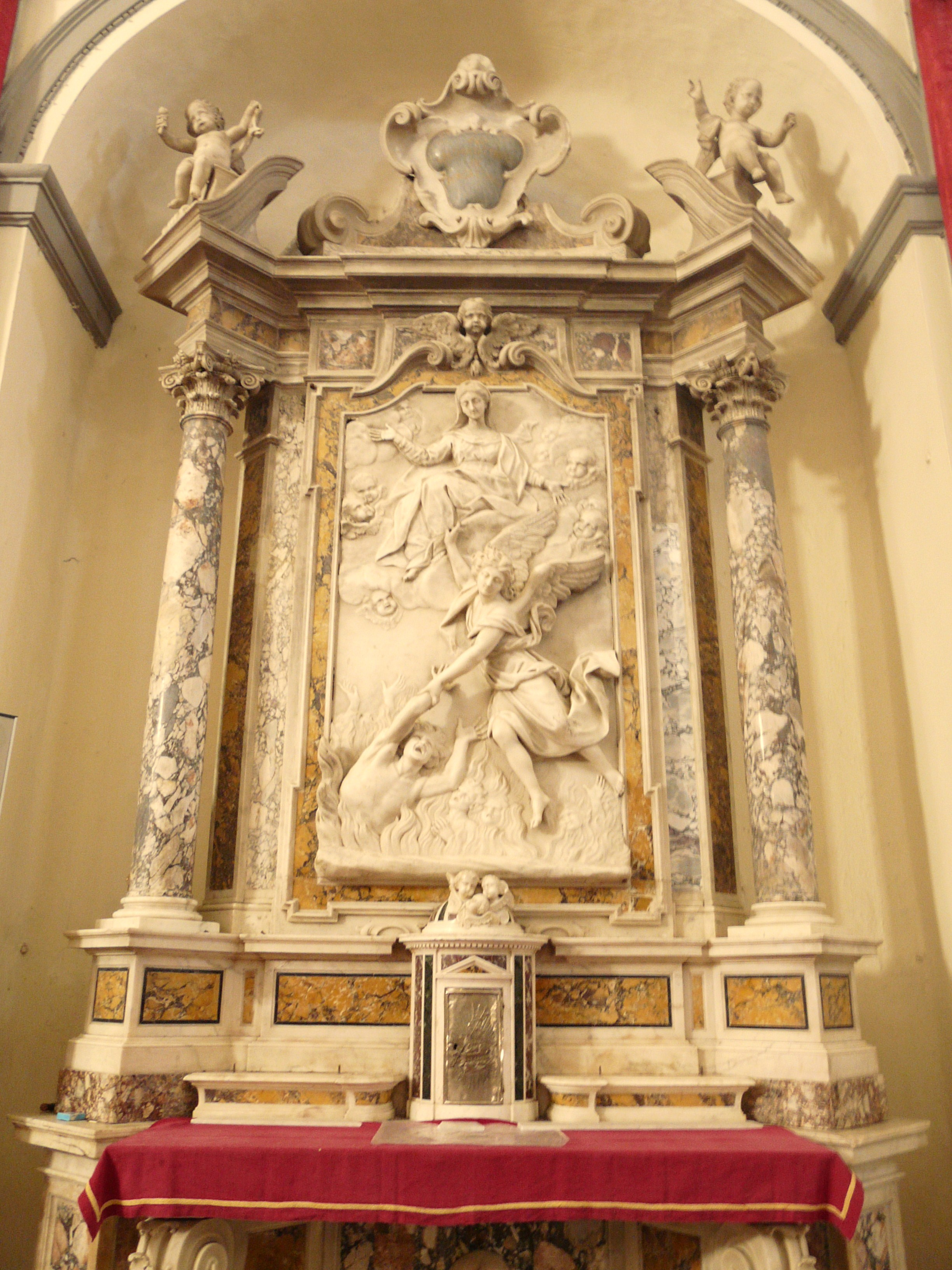
Altar of the Madonna del Suffragio, San Remigio, Fosdinovo.

Giovanni Baratta (1670–1747) was an Italian sculptor of the late-Baroque period.

He was born in Carrara, but active in Florence and Livorno. He was a pupil of Giovanni Battista Foggini. He has sculptures in church of San Ferdinando, Livorno. He also sculpted some works, including the Altar of the Madonna of the Suffrage (aiding the souls in purgatory) for the church of San Remigio, Fosdinovo. His statues of Hercules and Orpheus and Euridice were acquired by Danish king Frederick IV and are in the Hercules Pavilion in Copenhagen, Denmark.

He is the nephew of Francisco Baratta the elder, who worked in the studio of Bernini in Rome. Giovanni had two brothers who were also sculptors: Francesco Baratta the Younger and Pietro.
