= Toldbodgade =

Street in Copenhagen, Denmark

Coordinates: 55.6842°N 12.5950°E

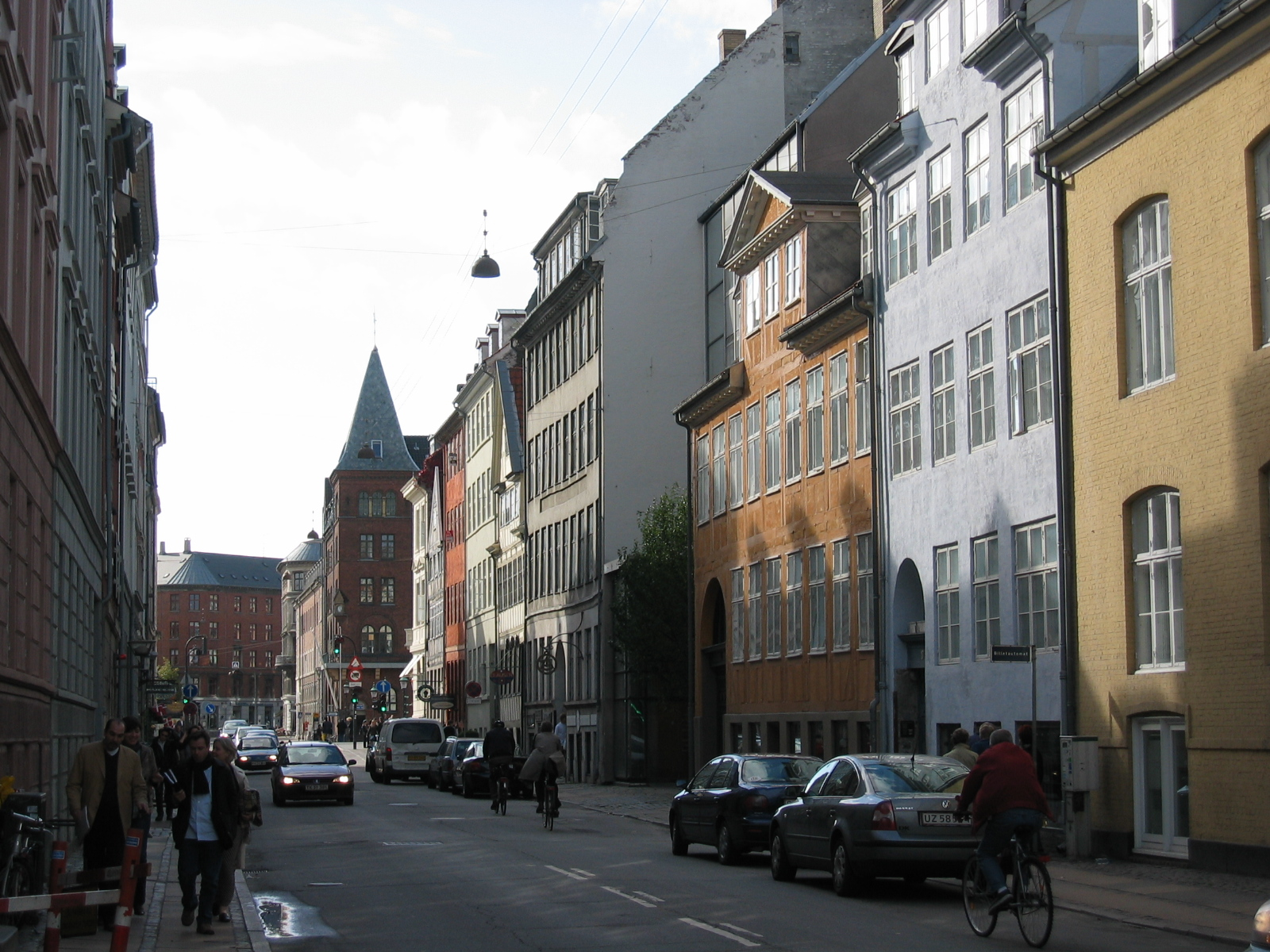
The southernmost part of Toldbodgade with Nyhavn in the background

Toldbodgade (lit. "Custom House Street") is a street in central Copenhagen, Denmark. It extends north from Nyhavn at the Nyhavn Bridge, continuing Holberggade, passes Sankt Annæ Plads after just one block, and continues straight until it reaches West India Warehouse where it makes a sharp left turn which connects it to Amaliegade, its parallel street, at the rear of the Design Museum.

The east side of the street is lined by a series of 18th century warehouses whose other sides face the Larsens Plads waterfront, which was a major hub for emigration to America.

== History ==
=== Origins ===
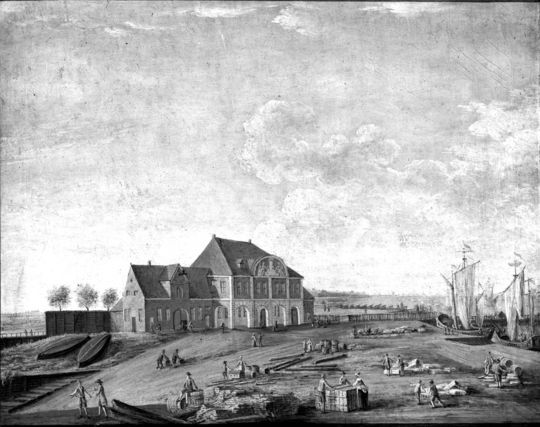
King Christian VI's Custom House in 1754

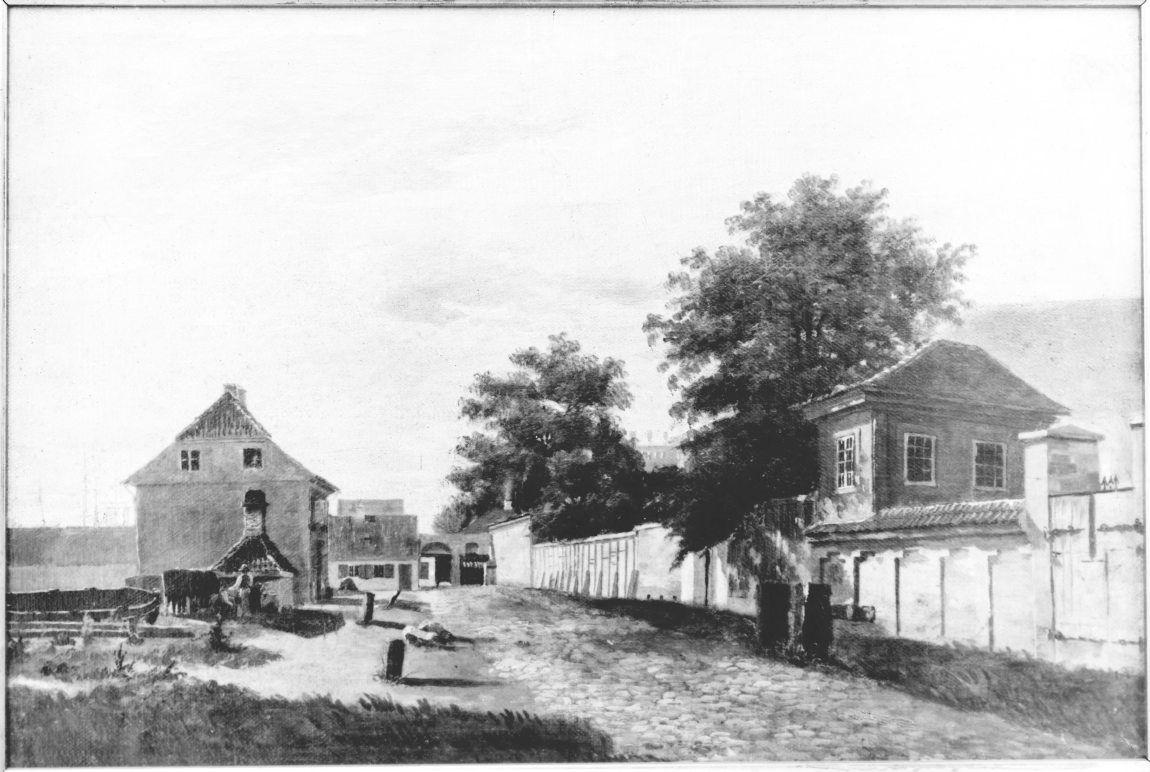
Ny Toldbodgade painted by C. F. Sørensen in circa 1845. The wall towards Amalienborg seen to the right.

The street traces its history back to Axel Ulstrup's New Copenhagen masterplan which recommended a regulation of the coastline north of the city, between Bremerholm and the Custom House which had been built in 1630. The name originally only referred to the southernmost section of the street while the section north of Sankt Annæ Plads was merely an embankment across the marshy terrain along the coast.

From about 1708 the area was filled and in 1719 the street was paved and became known as Ny Toldbodgade (English: New Custom House Street), a name it kept until 1940. It was described as the "most regular and longest street in the city". The street led to King Christian VI's new custom house which was completed in 1734 to the design of Johan Cornelius Krieger.

=== Place of contrasts ===
When Frederiksstaden was founded in 1750, Ny Toldbodgade came to mark the boundary between the busy life in the port and the elegant new residential district with its Rococo mansions. In 1755, due to the risk of fires, it was decided to relocate the lumberyards which had previously dominated the area along the water to Greenland, an undeveloped site adjacent to Nyboder, but the quay remained a very active part of the port. In the 1780s a row of warehouses was built along the east side of the street, where the lumberyards had once been, creating something of a barrier between the life of the port and that of Frederiksstaden.

=== Shanty housing and America boats ===
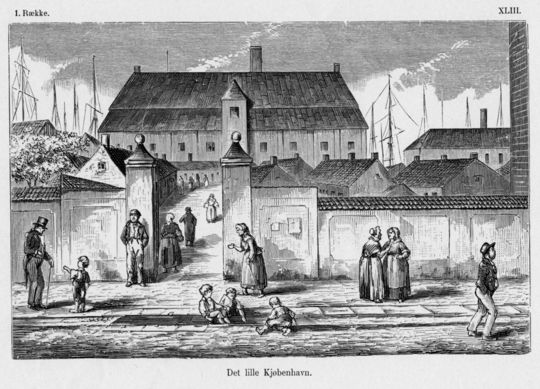
Shanty housing at Toldbodgade, drawing by P. Klæstrup

Up through the 19th century the street continued to be a place of contrasts as Frederiksstaden remained the most fashionable neighbourhood for Copenhagen's elite while the area along the street was settled by people who had been left homeless by the Copenhagen Fire of 1795 and the British Bombardment of 1807. They lived in interimistic, one-storey sheds which existed up until 1869 when the custom house was expanded.

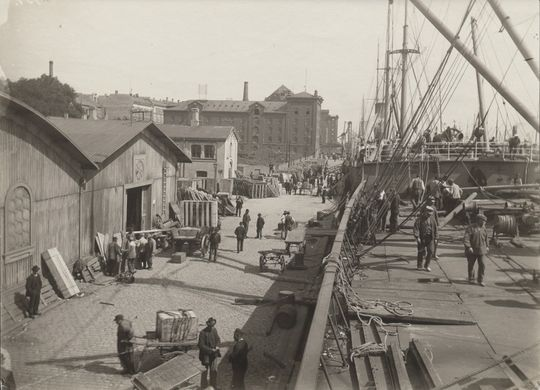
An America boat at 8 Toldbodgade/Larsens Place

In 1802, the site was acquired by a wealthy ship owner, Lars Larsen, who established a ship and lumber yard in the grounds which became known as Larsen's Place after its founder. Later in the century Larsen's Place became a hub for the America steamers which transported thousands of emigrants from all of Scandinavia to New York in search of a better future.

== Buildings ==
The most characteristic buildings along the street are the old warehouses along its east side. They were all designed by Caspar Frederik Harsdorff and include the Double Warehouse, the Blue Warehouse and West India Warehouse.

== Sculptory ==
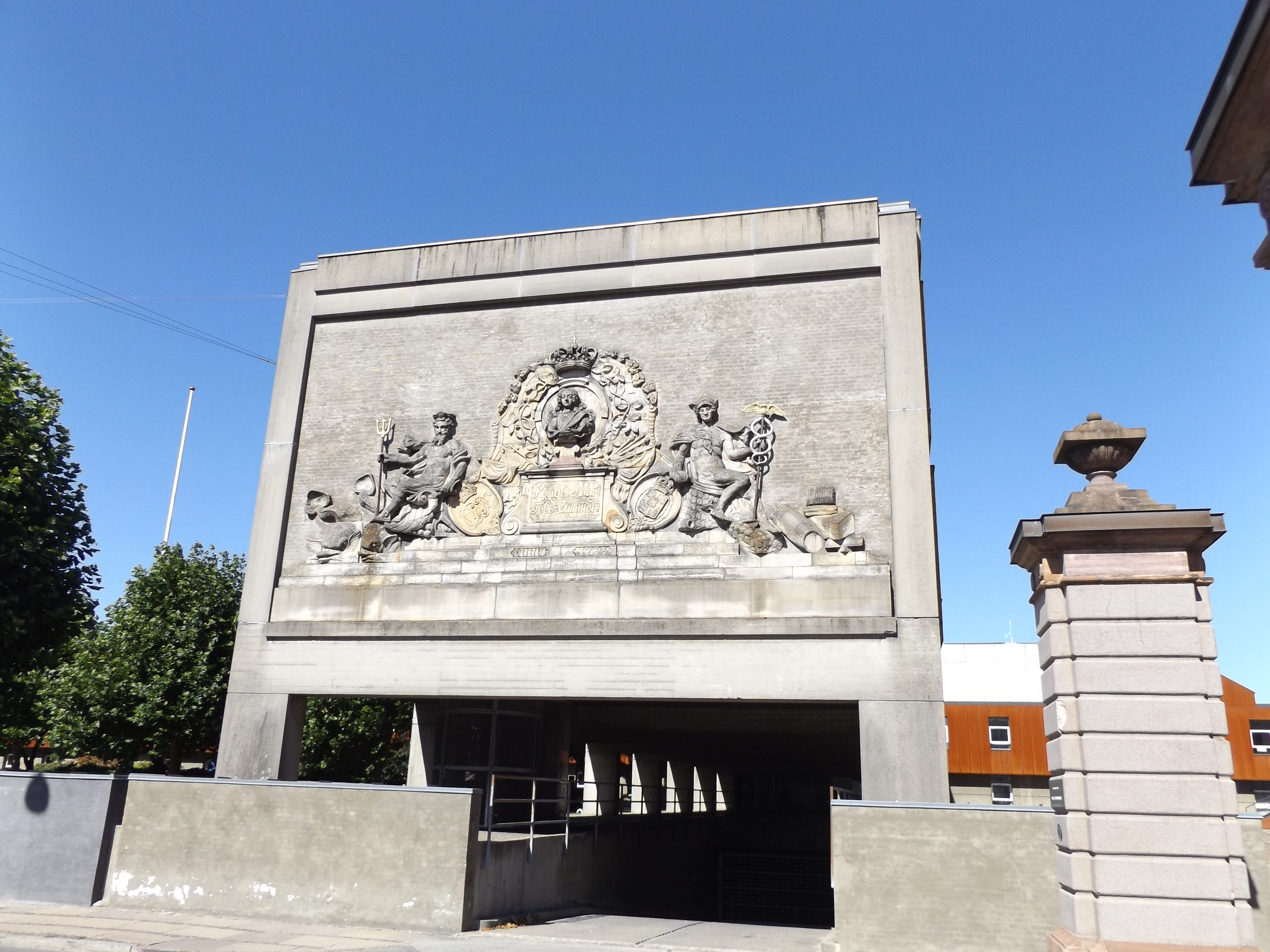
relief from the pediment of King Christian VI's Custom House

A relief from the pediment of King Christian VI's Custom House was saved when the building was demolished in 1891. It has now been installed on a wall, where it now serves as a point de vue at the north end of Toldbodgade, at the point where the street bends to join Amaliegade. It depicts the king flanked by Neptune and Mercury, the Roman Gods of seafaring and trade, holding a double edged trident and Caduceus respectively.

At the Amalie Garden stand two modern columns which flank the so-called Amalienborg Axis which bisects both Amalienborg Palace and Garden, offering views across the harbour to Copenhagen Opera House on one side and views across the central plaza of the palace to the Marble Church on the other. The columns were designed by Italian sculptor Arnaldo Pomodoro and installed in 1984 as part of the Amalie Garden.

== Toldbodgade today ==
Toldbodgade is centrally located between some of Copenhagen's most popular visitor attractions, including Nyhavn to the south, Amalienborg Palace and the design museum to the west and the Citadel and Langelinie with The Little Mermaid, although most pedestrians opt for the waterfront promenade along Larsens Plads. The old warehouses have been converted for other uses. The West India Warehouses now house the Royal Cast Collection, part of the National Gallery, as well as an exhibition of costumes from the Royal Danish Theatre, while the Double Warehouse has become the Copenhagen Admiral Hotel.

== See also ==
- Kronprinsessegade
- Borgergade
- Dronningens Tværgade
