= Caspar Frederik Harsdorff =

Danish architect (1735–1799)

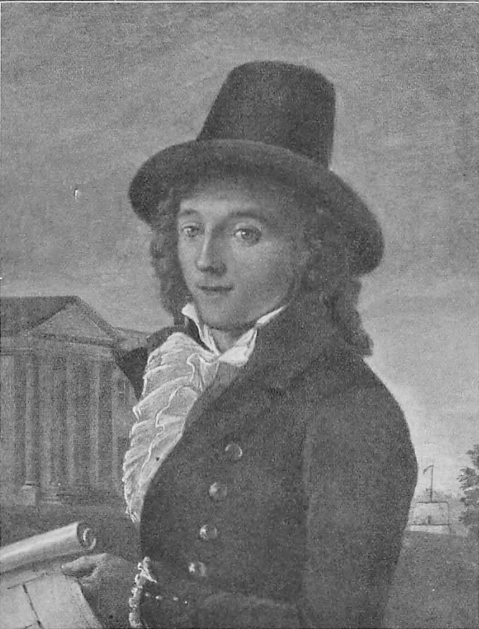
- Born: 26 May 1735; Copenhagen, Denmark
- Died: 24 May 1799 (aged 63); Copenhagen, Denmark
- Education: Royal Danish Academy of Fine Arts
- Occupation: Architect
- Buildings: Harsdorff House; Hercules Pavilion; Trondheim Cathedral School; Vestindisk Pakhus

Caspar Frederik (Friedrich) Harsdorff (26 May 1735 – 24 May 1799), also known as C.F. Harsdorff, was a Danish neoclassical architect considered to have been the leading Danish architect in the late 18th century.

== Early life and training ==
He was born Caspar Frederik Harsdørffer in Copenhagen, Denmark to German-born schoolteacher Johan Christopher Harsdørffer from Nürnberg and his Swedish-born wife Anne Marie Eriksdatter.

He began his education in mathematics in order to train for the Engineer Corps, but his interest lay in architecture, which he studied enthusiastically. When the Royal Danish Academy of Art (Det Kongelige Danske Kunstakademi) opened in 1754 at Charlottenborg Palace he was able to study under French architect Nicolas-Henri Jardin.

In 1756 his design for a city gate won the academy's large gold medallion, giving him the distinction of being the first Danish architect to win the coveted award. The award included a six-year travel grant.

== Education and travel years ==
In 1757, he traveled to Paris where he stayed there four years, also in the company of sculptor Carl Frederik Stanley who resided in Paris at the same time. While there he studied under Jacques-François Blondel (1705–1774) an architect employed by King Louis XV of France. In late spring 1762 he traveled to Rome, where he discovered the remains of Ancient Rome and drew and measured the antiquities he studied.

== Career in Denmark ==
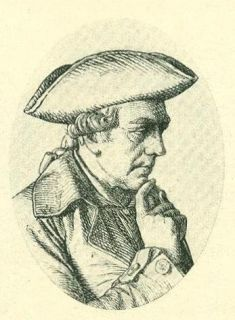
C. F. Harsdorff.

He returned to Denmark in 1764, and was named Building Inspector. That same year he was invited to join the academy, and received the assignment to design "Et kongeligt Palais, liggende paa en smuk Plads" ("A royal palace located on a beautiful plaza"). His design was judged successful, and he was accepted as member of the academy in 1765, where he was given a job as Professor in Perspective in 1766.

Between 1766 and 1769 he built the memorial chapel for former Lord High Steward Count Adam Gottlob Moltke at Karise Church in Faxe, which had been begun by his former teacher and now fellow Professor at the academy architect Nicolas-Henri Jardin.

In 1770 he was named Royal Building Master to the court of King Christian VII. In 1771 Professor Jardin requested that Harsdorff be named his successor as Professor of Architecture at the academy, which position he filled that year after Jardin vacated the position on 26 March in conjunction with his leaving Denmark to return to France. As professor he played an important role in the classical education of the next generation of architects. His students included Peter Meyn, Joseph Christian Lillie and Christian Frederik Hansen.

Harsdorff also became a member of the Main Building Directorate (Overbygnings direktionen) in 1771.

In 1773 he designed the pulpit at Our Saviour's Church (Vor Frelsers Kirke) in the Christianshavn district of Copenhagen. The neoclassical wood pulpit is painted to look like golden marble, and features a frieze attributed to Johannes Wiedewelt and Peder Als.

That same year he rebuilt in the King's Garden (Kongens Have), the gardens at Rosenborg Castle in Copenhagen, the temple-like Hercules Pavilion for which Johannes Wiedewelt's studio produced the reliefs of Hercules and Omphale. The pavilion now houses a café.

He also was commissioned to enlarge the Nicolai Eigtved-designed The Royal Theatre (1748) on Kongens Nytorv that year. In the course of his work on this project he received permission to develop the site between the theatre and Charlottenborg Palace, home of the Art Academy, which he then developed 1779–1780 as a home for his family. Rebuilding of the theatre was carried on 1773–1774.

In 1774-1779 he designed and started building the austere memorial chapels for Christian VI and Frederik V at Roskilde Cathedral. Work on this project, however, was stopped in 1779 because of lack of money. The work began again many years after his death, and was completed by his student Christian Frederik Hansen (1820–1825).

Harsdorff acted as the academy's Director 1777–1779, and was named to the title of Justitsraad in 1778.

In 1779-1780 he designed and built Harsdorff House at Kongens Nytorv 3–5, which became the new model for Copenhagen townhouses of the time. The building is shown on a Danish postage stamp, part of series entitled Danish Houses which features significant Danish buildings. The building is now owned by real estate company Karberghus. The tenants include the Harsdorffs Hus Office Club.

Between 1781 and 1785 he designed the interior design in two large rooms at The Royal Library. In 1781 he was named Head Royal Building Master.

Between 1794 and 1795 he designed and built the colonnade at Amalienborg Palace to connect the recently occupied King's palace, Moltke Palace, with the Crown Prince's residence, Schack's Palace.

In 1795 he was asked to create plans for Frederik's Church (Frederikskirke), now known as The Marble Church (Marmorkirken), work on which had been halted 1770 after French neoclassical architect Nicolas-Henri Jardin had led the effort. Harsdorff created two plans, and made a model of one of them. The project was approved, but Harsdorff health was now weak. The work eventually was developed according to plans by Ferdinand Meldahl (1827–1908).

== Personal life ==
In May 1770 Harsdorff married the widow Elisabeth (Elsebeth) Margrethe Braun, daughter of Building Master to the royal court Jacob Fortling. The couple had three children of whom two daughters survived

In May 1799 he became sick at his country home Rosenlund on Gammel Kongevej, Frederiksberg, and he died there on 24 May 1799. He was buried in Assistens Cemetery (Assistens Kirkegård), Copenhagen. He was survived by his wife.

== Aftermath ==
Art historian and critic Niels Lauritz Høyen's Nordic Art Society (Selskabet for nordisk Kunst) published the book "C. F. Harsdorffs Værker" (1871).

In 1985, a memorial plaque in his memory was erected at Assistens Kirkegård.

An exhibition devoted to his work was held in Copenhagen's Kunstindustrimuseet September 1985.

Cultural offices
Preceded by Johannes Wiedewelt	Director of the Royal Danish Academy of Fine Arts; 1777–1779	Succeeded by Johannes Wiedewelt
