= Amaliehaven =

Historic park in Copenhagen

Coordinates: 55°41′00″N 12°35′42″E

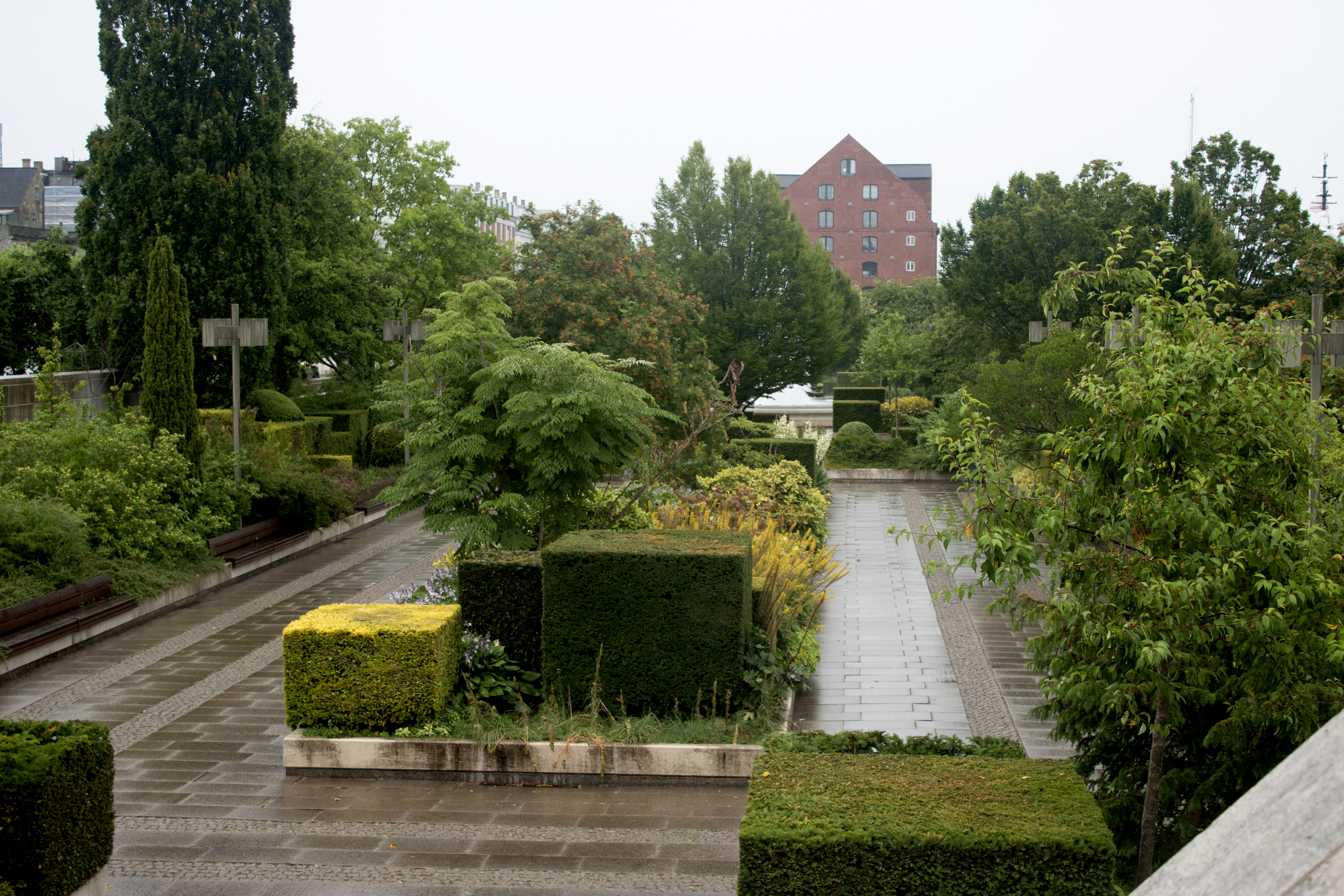
- Amaliehaven
- Interactive map of Amaliehaven
- Type: Public
- Location: Frederiksstaden, Copenhagen; Denmark
- Created: 1983
- Designer: Jean Delognes
- Owner: Danish state and Copenhagen Municipality
- Operator: Parks and Palaces Agency

Amaliehaven (English: The Amalie Garden) is a small park located between Amalienborg Palace and the waterfront in the Frederiksstaden neighbourhood of central Copenhagen, Denmark. It was established in 1983 as a gift from the A.P. Møller and the Chastine McKinney Møller Foundation. The park is part of the so-called Frederiksgade axis, the shorter but more distinctive of the two axes on which Frederiksstaden is centred.

== Larsens Plads ==
Amaliehaven is located on a site where there used to be a shipyard established in 1802 by a wealthy ship-owner named Lars Larsen. The shipyard and its large lumberyard were situated right beside Amalienborg Palace and have been called “Larsen’s Plads” since 1821 after its founder.

In 1870 the shipyard was closed and a new port terminal was established at the site in 1879 by the Thingvalla Line which began operations of a direct route between Scandinavian ports and America which was to offer the growing number of Scandinavian emigrants affordable, comfortable and safe voyages. In 1898 the Thingvalla Line was acquired by DFDS, another Danish based shipping company, and the Scandinavian-American passenger service was operated under the name Scandinavian America Line.

The route to America with Scandinavian America Line was discontinued in 1935 and the quay area was later taken over by the Oslo Ferries which started in 1866 and has since relocated to the Free Port Terminal further north.

=== Creation of the new park ===
The park is the result of a donation from the A.P. Møller and Chastine McKinney Møller Foundation. Construction started in 1981 and it was inaugurated in 1983. The garden was designed by the Belgian landscape architect Jean Delogne.

== Design ==
Amaliehaven is a rectangular park built to a stringent, symmetrical design centred on a large fountain to respect and accentuate the Frederiksgade axis which unifies the entire area. On both sides of the central fountain, the gardens continue on two levels, with shrubs and walls enclosing it from the waterfront on one side and the street on the other.

== Plants and sculptory ==
The garden abounds with different varieties of plants and fragrant flowers whose colours and natural shapes create a contrast to the geometrical layout of the park. Japanese cherry trees, blooming in April, play a particularly distinctive role among the parks vegetation.

Italian sculptor Arnaldo Pomodoro created the central fountain, four large abstract columns and two sun-like water features which, from each their end of the park, sprinkle the garden with their jets of water.

== Gallery ==
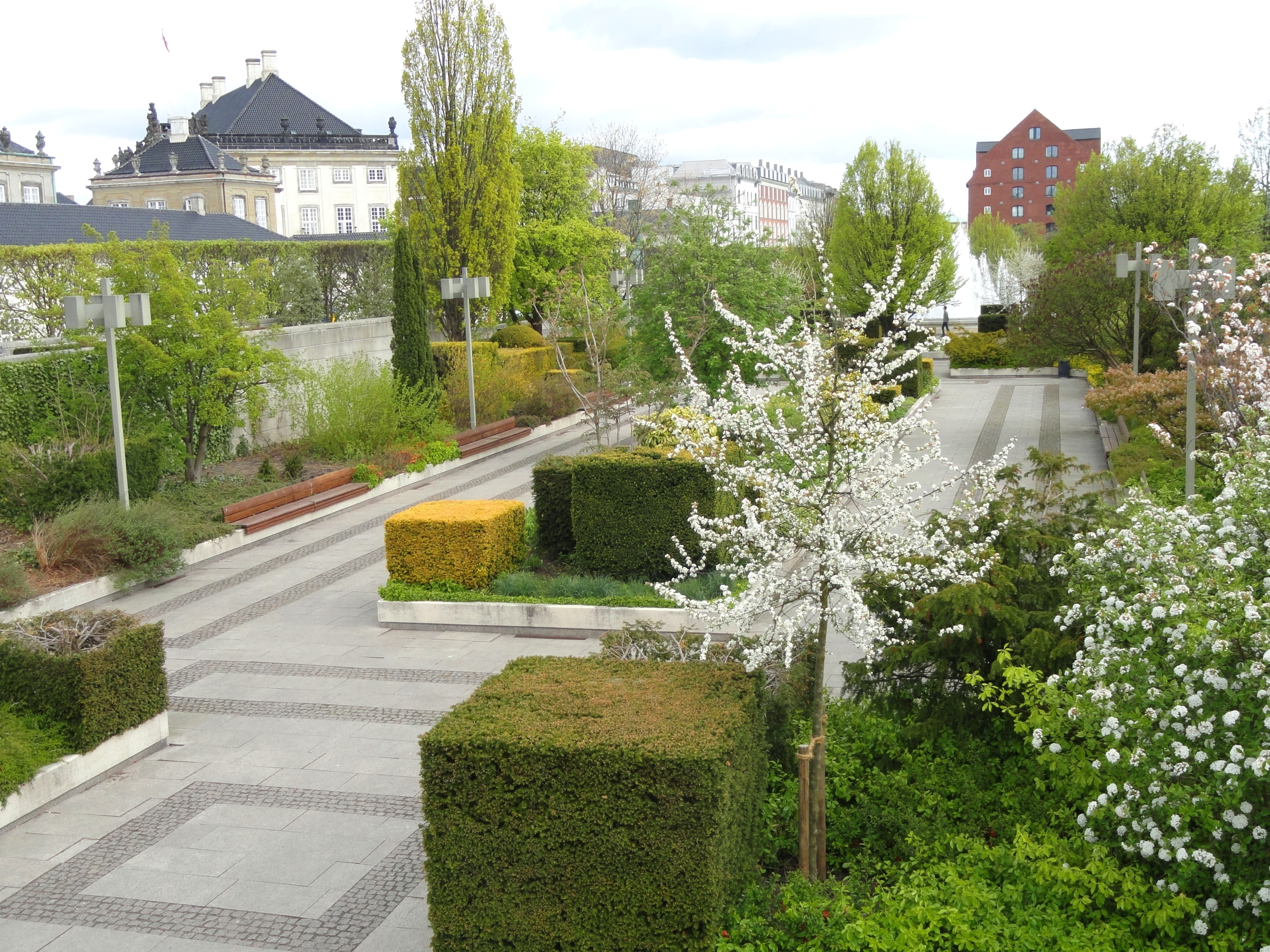
The park

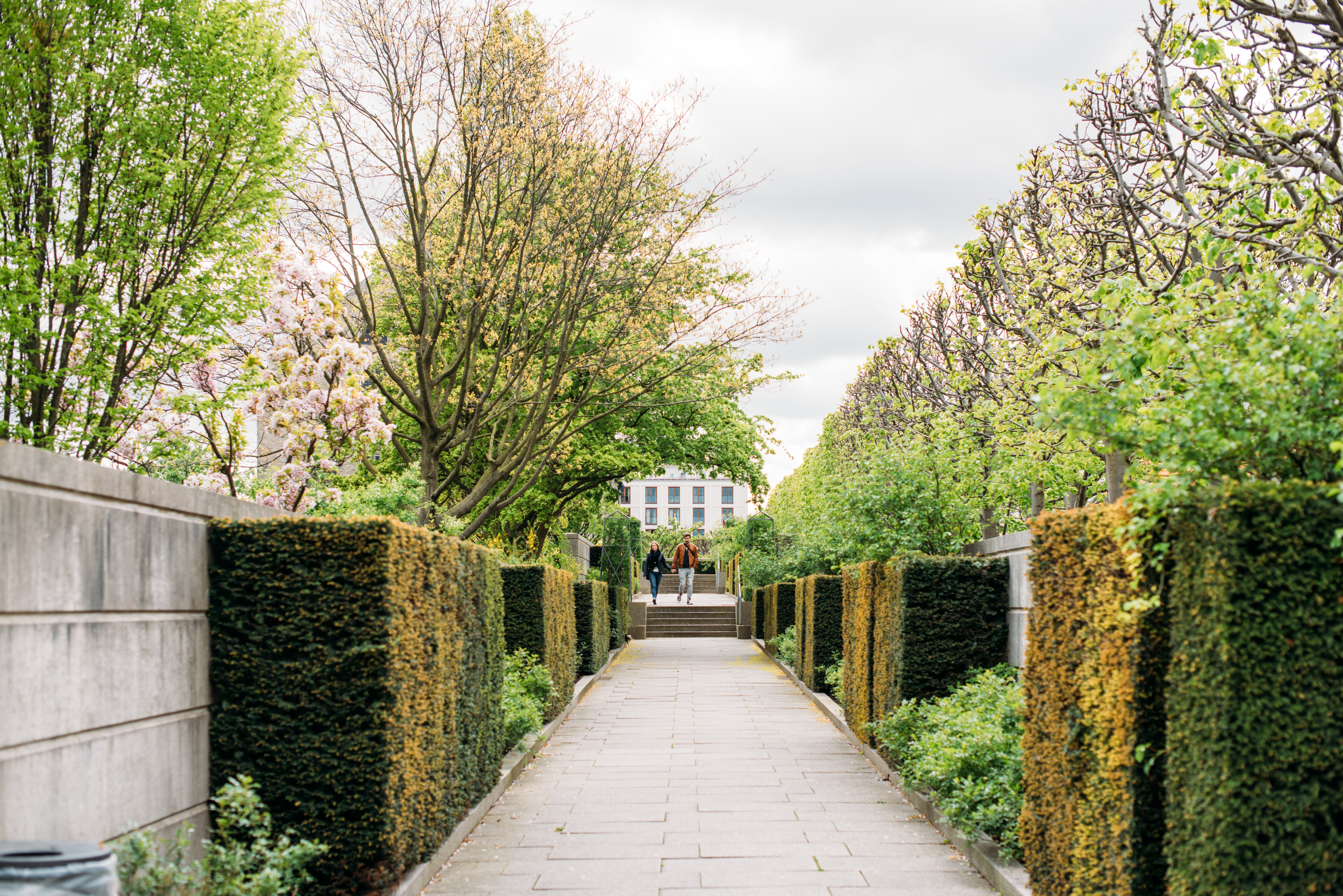
Path

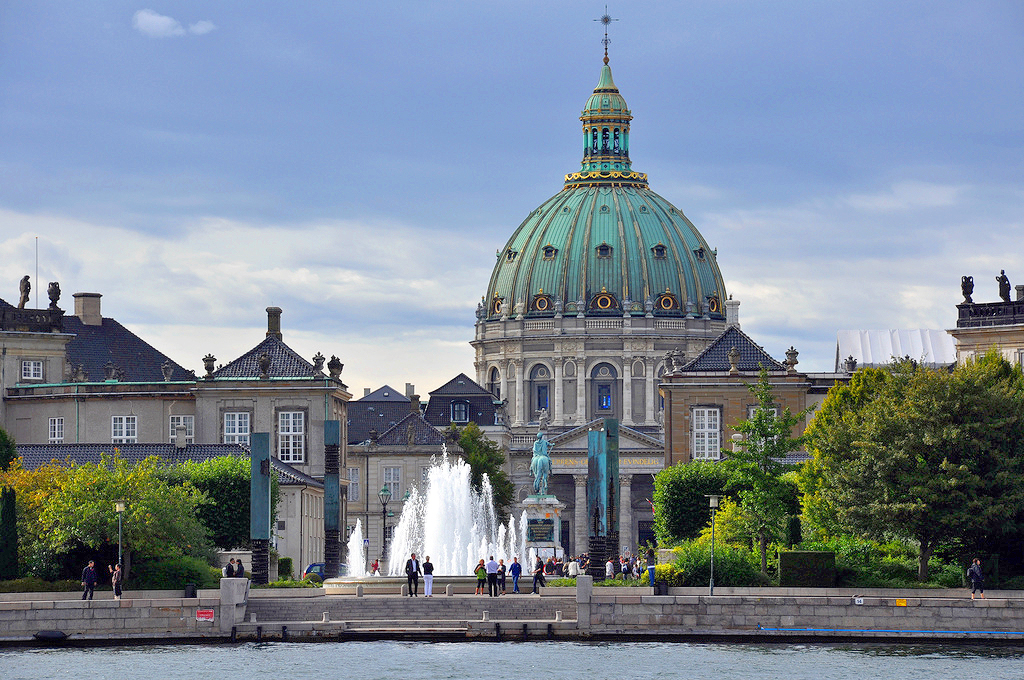
Amaliehaven viewed from the water with the Marble Church flanked by two of the mansions of Amalienborg Palace as a backdrop

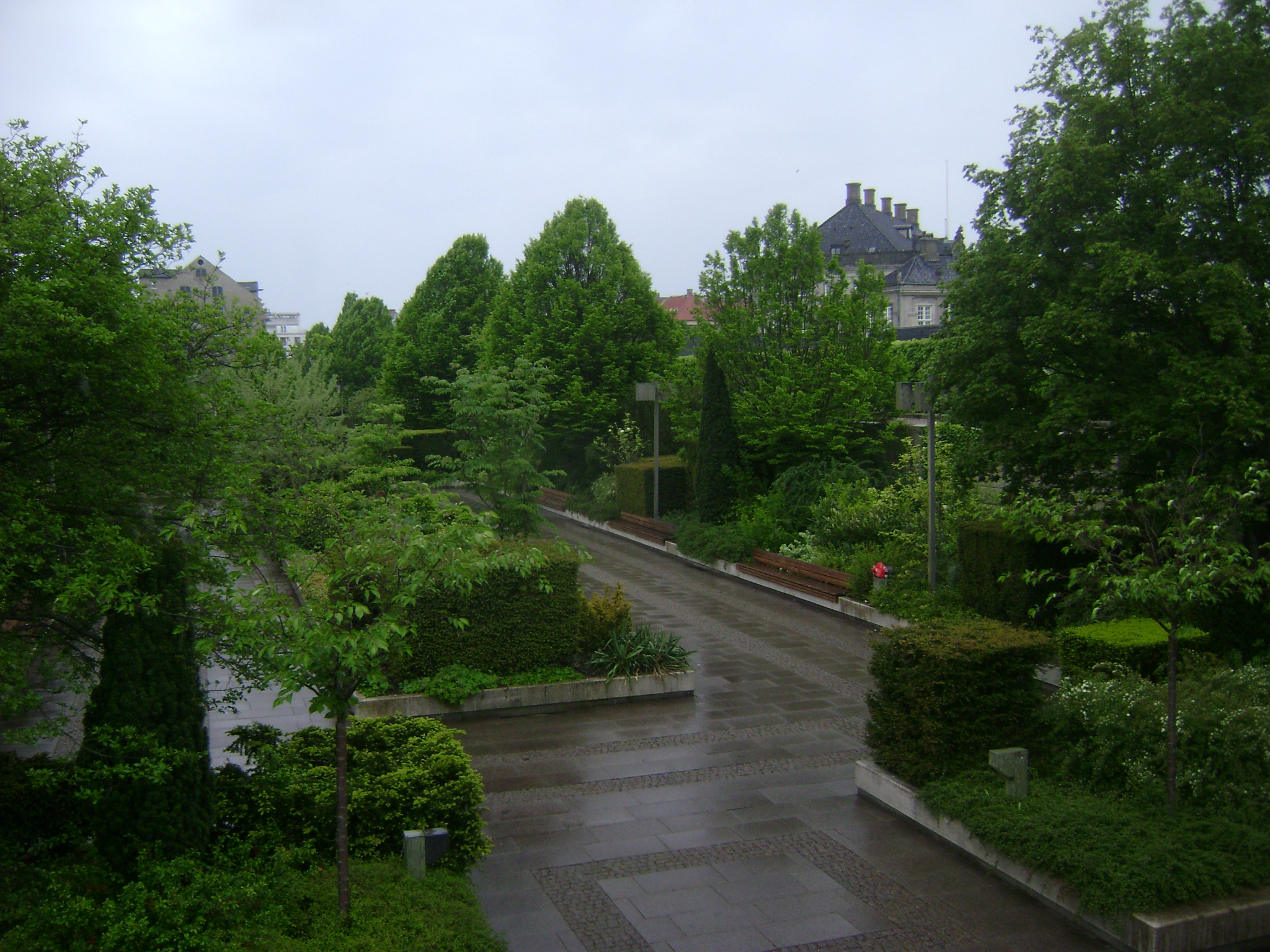

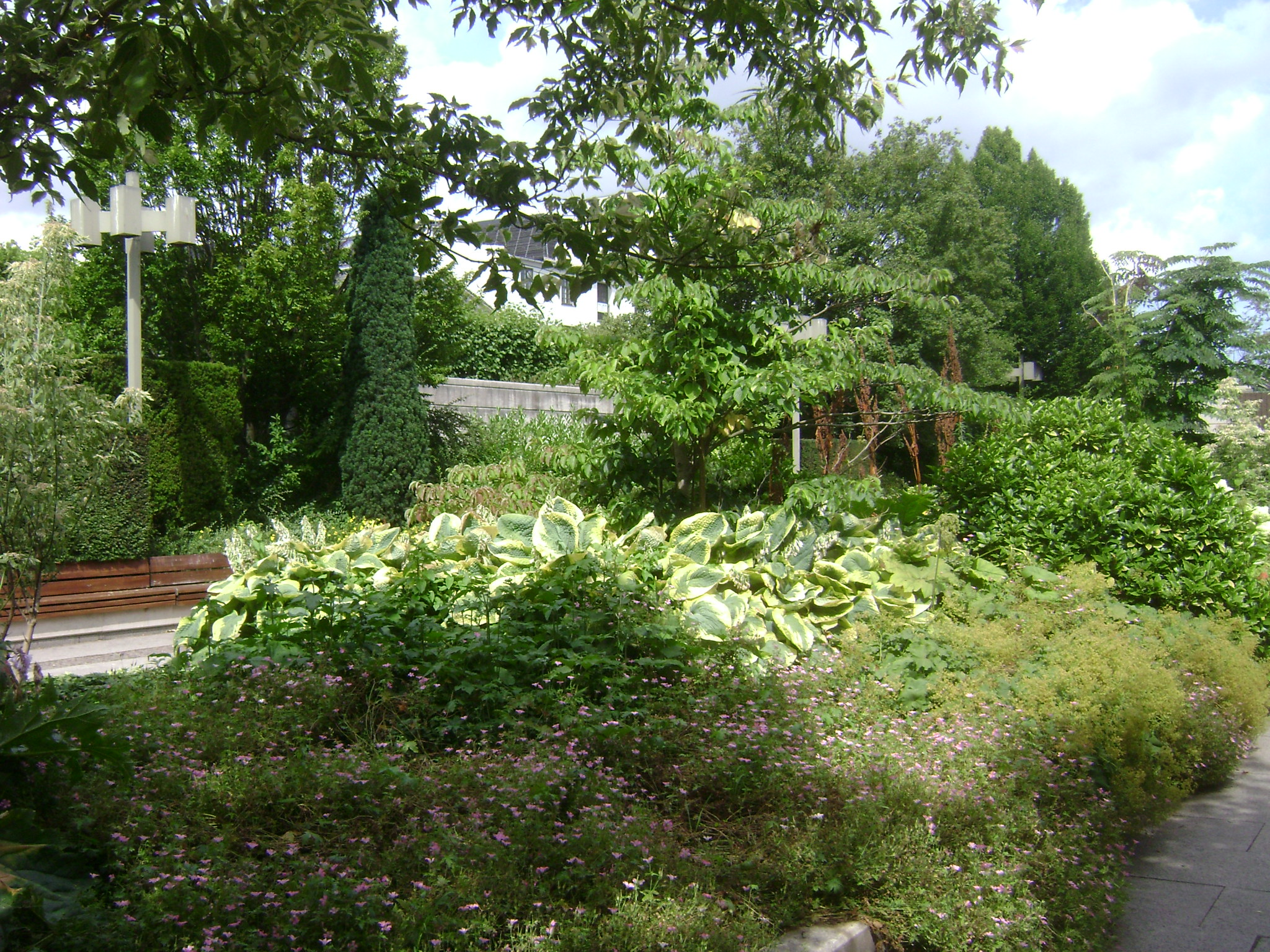

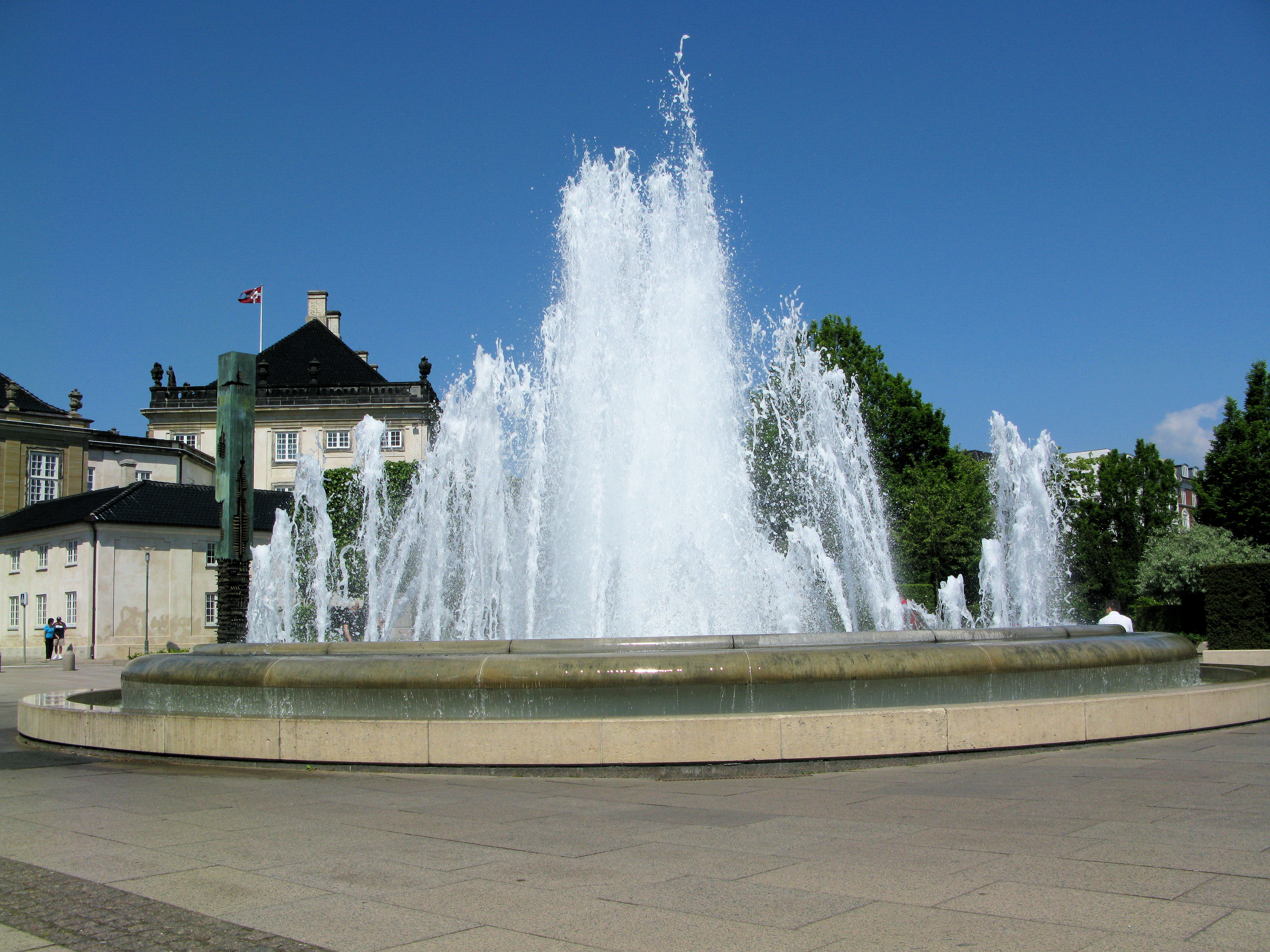

== See also ==
- Parks and open spaces in Copenhagen
