= United States (disambiguation) =

The United States is a country located mainly in North America.

United States may also refer to:

== Countries ==
- United Mexican States

=== Former countries ===
- United States of Belgium
- United States of Brazil
- United States of Central America
- United States of Colombia
- United States of Indonesia
- United States of the Ionian Islands
- United States of Stellaland
- United States of Venezuela

=== Hypothetical countries ===
- United States of Europe, hypothetical country emerging from a federated Europe
- United States of Latin Africa, proposed union of Romance-language-speaking countries in Central Africa
- United States of China, suggested concept by Chen Jiongming for a federal China

== Other political entities ==
- United Arab States
- United States of Matsya, a former state of India

== Arts and entertainment ==
- United States (TV series), a 1980 American sitcom
- United States (album), 2009, by Paul Gilbert and Freddie Nelson
- United States, a 2014 album by Ian McLagan
- "United States", a song by Smashing Pumpkins from the 2007 album Zeitgeist

== Transportation ==
- List of ships named United States, many ships, including
  - SS United States, a retired ocean liner built in 1950
  - SS United States (1864), a merchant steamship lost in 1881
  - SS United States (1903), a ship of the Scandinavian American Line scrapped in 1935
  - USS United States, the name of several U.S. Navy ships
- United States, a presidential railcar built for Abraham Lincoln

== See also ==
- American (disambiguation)
- American republic (disambiguation)
- United Kingdom (disambiguation)
- United Provinces (disambiguation)
- United State (disambiguation)
- The United States of America (disambiguation)
- United States of North America (disambiguation)
- List of countries that include United States in their name
- U.S. state, a constituent political entity of the United States of America
- Demonyms for the United States
