= List of ships named SS United States =

SS United States is the name of the following ships named for the United States:

- SS United States (1860), a merchant wrecked in 1861
- SS United States (1862), a steamship acquired by the United States Navy in 1863
- SS United States (1864), a merchant steamship lost in 1881
- SS United States (1903), a ship of the Scandinavian American Line scrapped in 1935
- SS United States (1909), a passenger ferry
- SS United States (1951), an ocean liner sunk as an artificial reef in 2026

== Similar ==
- SS United States Victory, a Victory ship between 1944 and 1947
- USS United States, the name of five different United States Navy ships since 1797

== See also ==
- SS United States: Lady in Waiting, a 2008 documentary about the 1951 SS United States
- List of ships named United States
- United States (disambiguation)
