= List of countries that include United States in their name =

United States generally refers to the United States of America, but there are other countries and groups of countries with "United States" in their name. The list includes countries and groups of countries, that are real, proposed or fictional:

== Existing countries ==
- United Mexican States, the official name of Mexico, an independent state since 1821
- United States of America, the official name of America, an independent state since 1776

== Historical countries or groups ==
- United States of Belgium, a confederation that existed during the year 1790
- Republic of the United States of Brazil (Portuguese: República dos Estados Unidos do Brasil), the official name of Brazil between 1889 and 1937
- United States of Brazil, the official name of Brazil between 1937 and 1967
- United States of Central America (informal name), or the United Provinces of Central America and the Federal Republic of Central America, in existence from 1823 to 1841
- United States of Colombia, name held by Colombia between 1863 and 1886
- United States of Indonesia, name of the country from 1949 to 1950
- United States of the Ionian Islands, former British protectorate from 1815 to 1864
- United State of Saurashtra, an Indian state between 1948 and 1956
- United States of Stellaland, a short-lived political union of Goshen and Stellaland proper in southern Africa from 1883 to 1885
- United State of Travancore and Cochin, the former Indian state of Travancore-Cochin between 1949 and 1950
- United States of Venezuela, from 1864 to April 15, 1953
- United Arab States, confederation of the United Arab Republic and North Yemen between 1958 and 1961

== Proposed countries or groups ==
- United States of Latin Africa, a political entity proposed by Barthélemy Boganda for Central Africa
- United States of China, once advocated before the unification of China by Chiang Kai-shek
- United States of Europe, a political concept of a single European state
- United States of Africa, a political concept similar to the United States of Europe
- United States of South America, a proposed federation in South America or Latin America
- United States of Greater Austria, a successor state to the Austro-Hungarian Empire proposed by Archduke Franz Ferdinand
- United States of Australia, a name suggested before the creation and federation of the Commonwealth of Australia
- United States of Poland, an unrealized political concept of reborn Poland, between 1860 and 1941

== Fictional uses ==
- United States of Canada, a satirically proposed country formed from Canada and the liberal blue states of the U.S., as opposed to Jesusland
- United States of Mexamericanada, a satirical reference in 21st century politics
- United States of the West, the admission of the European countries as states of the U.S., as satirically advocated by Régis Debray in his paper Empire 2.0
- United States of Earth, a name for a political union that would encompass all nations on Earth, proposed by U.S. Congressman Lucas M. Miller in the 19th century. Also used for the world government in the TV show Futurama.

== See also ==
- United States (disambiguation)
- United State (disambiguation)
- United Provinces (disambiguation)
