= Frederick VIII =

Frederick VIII or Friedrich VIII may refer to:

== Rulers ==
- Frederick VIII of Zollern (d. 1333)
- Frederick VIII of Schleswig-Holstein (1829–1880)
- Frederick VIII of Denmark (1843–1912)

== Ships ==
- SS Frederik VIII, DFDS ocean liner launched 1913, retired 1936

== See also ==
- Frederik VIII's Palace, part of the Amalienborg palace complex in Copenhagen
- King Frederik VIII Land, in northeastern Greenland
