= Usonia (name) =

Proposed alternative name for The United States

Usonia is an alternative name for the United States of America coined by Scottish writer James Duff Law. The term was repurposed and re-popularized by architect Frank Lloyd Wright in a style of affordable, and modern residential style, distinctly American architecture and lifestyle.

Wright thought “United States” was mainly a political label, describing a federation of states rather than a cultural identity. He was interested in defining what he believed was a uniquely 'American way' of living beyond politics, not just the constitutional structure behind it.

Wright expresses support for using the term in his 1957 work A Testament. He wanted a term that uniquely identified the U.S. without ambiguity, since 'America' refers to two continents. He also argued that many countries can be described as 'United States of', as the term is also used in other federal states such as the United Mexican States, the United States of Brazil, and the United States of Indonesia. Lloyd associated Usonia with middle class, democratic societies rather than European old-world class systems.

In 1903, Duff wrote:

“We of the United States, in justice to Canadians and Mexicans, have no right to use the title ‘Americans’ when referring to matters pertaining exclusively to ourselves.”

Puerto Rican philosopher and sociologist Jose F. Buscaglia uses the term 'Usonian' when criticizing American imperialism.

== Etymology ==
James Duff Law derived the term from 'United States of North America' (specifically, the unofficial USONA acronym for it), but suggested 'Usonia' over 'Usona' as the former was "more euphonious."

According to some accounts, the term may have circulated informally in Europe around 1910 as a proposed alternative to “U.S.A.,” possibly to avoid confusion with the newly formed Union of South Africa.

According to the philologist Charles Alphonso Smith in his 1919 work New-Words Self-defined, the term 'Usonia' was first used in 1885 in Toronto, Canada.

In Esperanto, the word usono was chosen to avoid ambiguity.

== In popular culture ==
In the 2020 real-time strategy video game Iron Harvest, 'Usonia' is a name given to an alternate history version of the United States.
