= Statian =

Statian may refer to:

- Statian, short for United Statian – demonyms for the United States
- Statian – demonym for Sint Eustatius
- Afro-Statian – demonym for Afro-Dutch people from Sint Eustatius
- Statian English – English-based creole spoken in the Virgin Islands and the SSS islands

== See also ==
- List of adjectival and demonymic forms for countries and nations
