= Nyhavn 1 =

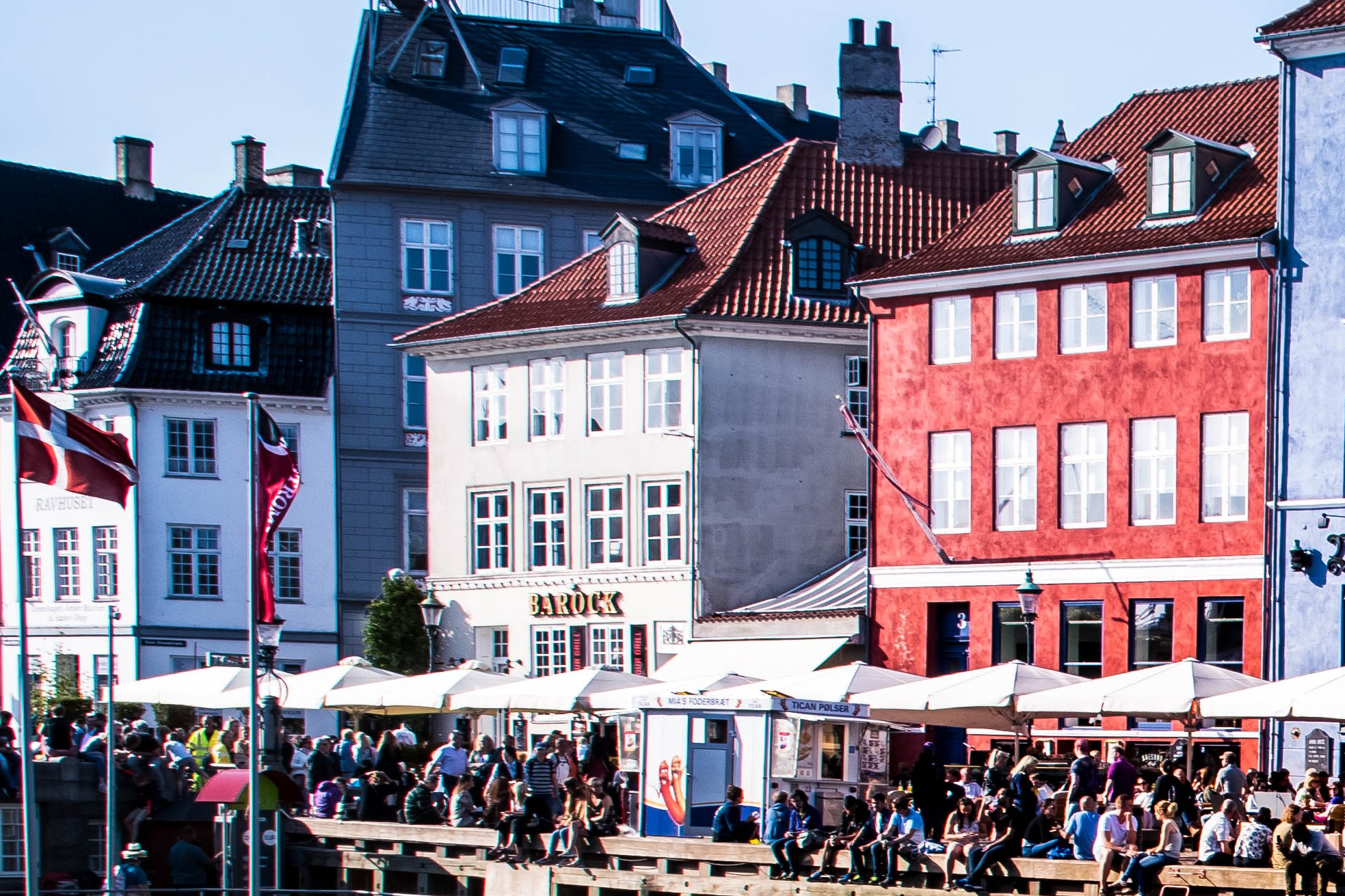
- Nyhavn 1
- Interactive map of the Nyhavn 1 area

General information
- Location: Copenhagen, Denmark, Denmark
- Coordinates: 55°40′50.98″N 12°35′16.7″E
- Construction started: 1753
- Completed: 1817

Nyhavn 1 is an 18th-century property at the acute corner of Nyhavn with Store Strandstræde in central Copenhagen, Denmark. It was listed in the Danish registry of protected buildings and places in 1987. Notable former residents include actor and singer Peter Schram (1819–1895).

== History ==
=== Store Strandstræde No. 122, 1689–1817 ===
The Store Strandstræde property was listed in Copenhagen's first cadastre from 1689 as No. 42 in St. Ann's East Quarter, owned by Danske Kancelli courier Peder Andersen. The present building on the site was constructed before 1731. The property was listed in the new cadastre of 1756 as No. 122, owned by one Rasmus Steger's widow.

=== Nyhavn No. 1, 1689–1798 ===
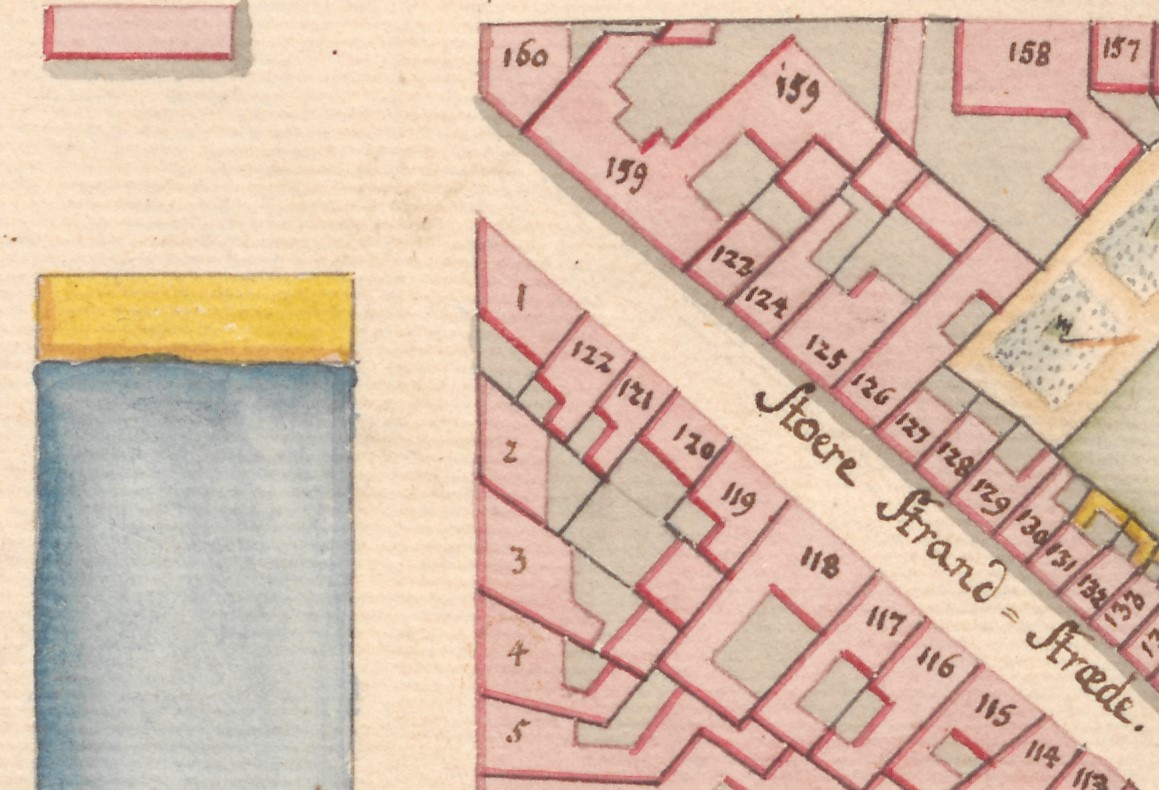
No. 1 seen in a detail from Christian Gedde's map of St. Ann's East Quarter, 1757

The Nyhavn property was listed in Copenhagen's first cadastre from 1689 as No. 1 in St. Ann's East Quarter (Sankt Annæ Øster Kvarter), owned by locksmith Hans Monnike. A new building was constructed in 1753 fir locksmith Peder Jørgensen Ambus.

The building was purchased in 1776 by wine merchant Lars Fogh Rasmusen. He had two years earlier started his own wine business. After his death, in 1782, his widow Dorethe (née Helt) married secondly to Peter Handerup (born 1746), another wine merchant, who from then on continued the business. At the time of the 1787 census, they resided in the building with two children from Helt's first marriage, an apprentice and two maids. In 1792, No. 1 and the associated wine business was taken over by Johan Friderich Inselmann (1753–1798).

=== Hansen family ===
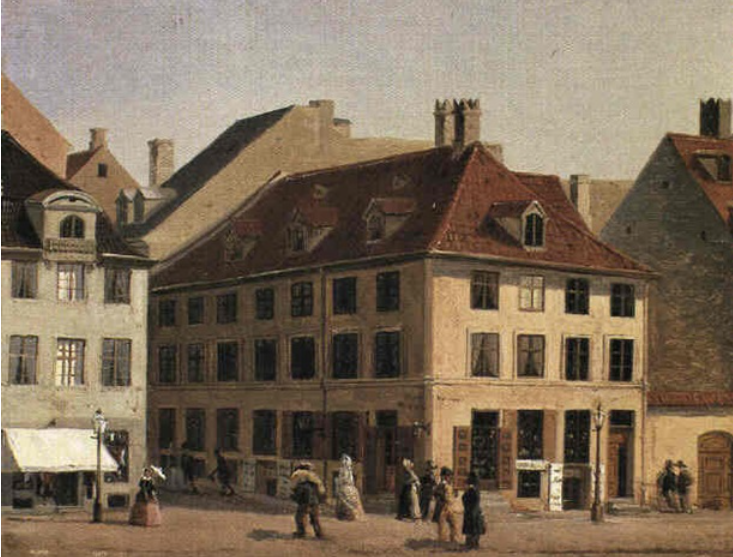
Nyhavn 1 painted by Anreas Juuel in 1865

In 1798, Inselmann sold the property and associated wine business to Niels Hansen (1769–1801). At the time of the 1801 census, Hansen resided in the building with his 21-year-old wife Bolette Kirstine Hvidberg, their two-year-old son Anders Hvidberg Hansen, two employees in Hansen's wine business (one of them an apprentice) and two maids. Otto Didrich Hansen, a controller at [the Class-Lottery and possibly a relative of the proprietor, was in 1801 also living in the building with his wife Agnete Rasmussen, the 13-year-old boy Peter Martin Linck Meyer and one maid.

When Niels Hansen died later in the same year, Bolette Kirstine Hansen (née Hvidberg) took over the operations.

=== Jürgensen and Lorck ===
In 1808, Bolette Kirstine Hansen married Frantz Diderich Jürgensen (1777–1840) to whom the company and property was then ceded in accordance with the Danish property laws of the time. In 1817, he merged Nyhavn 1 with Store Strandstræde 2.

At the time of the 1834 census, Frantz Diderich Jürgensen and Bollette Kirstine Hvidberg resided in the building with their five unmarried children (aged 13 24) and four employees. The 24-year-old son Hans Ludvig Jürgensen was active in the company.

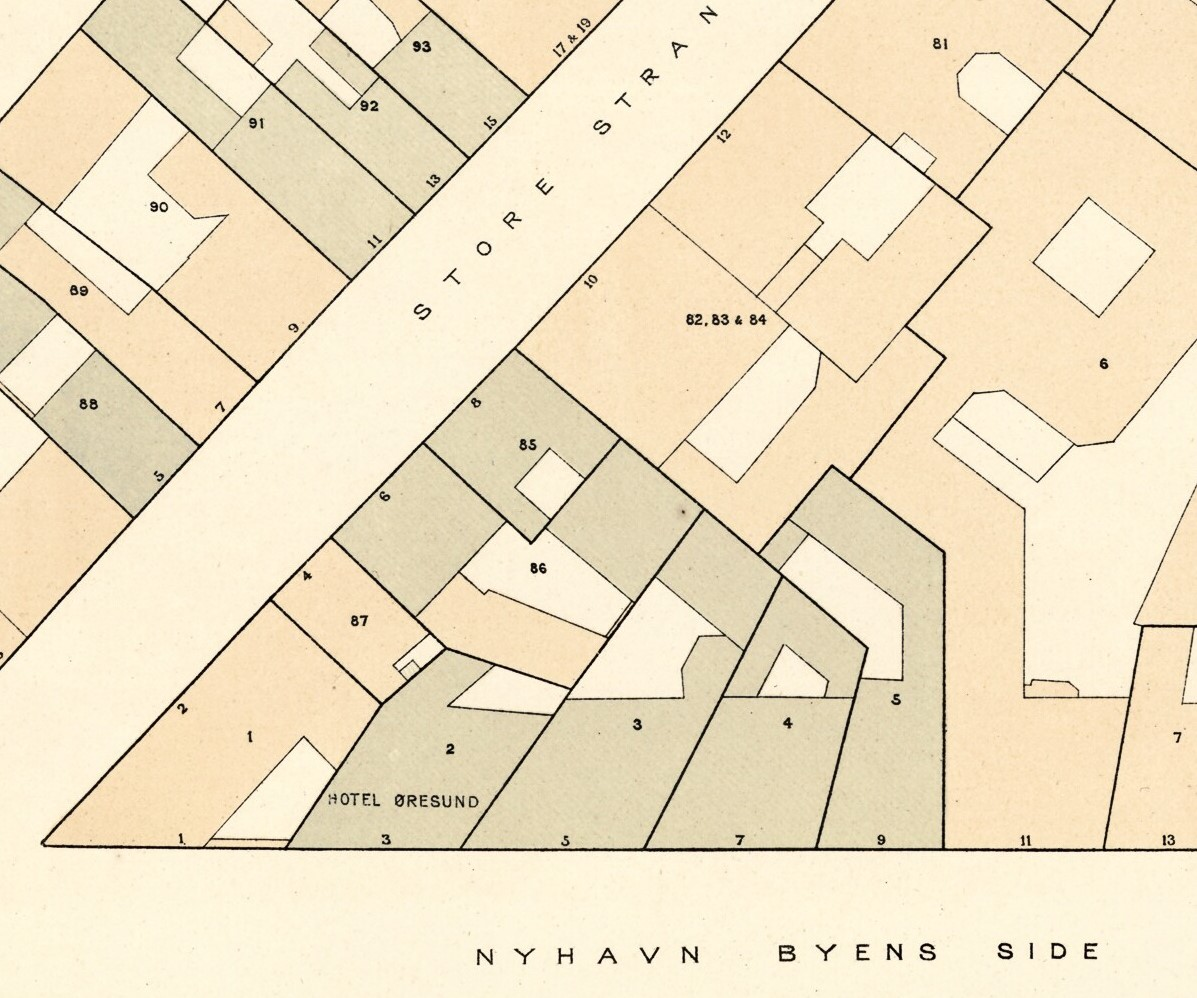
Nyhavn 1 seen on one of Berggreen's block plans of St. Ann's East Quarter

The property was home to 19 residents in three households at the 1840 census. Frantz Diderich Jürgensen resided on the first floor with his wife B. Jürgensen, two of their children (aged 18 and 27), the employee Niels Ferdinand Lorck (1816–1844), one apprentice, one male servant and one maid. S. Ravn, a hosier (hosekræmmer), resided on the ground floor with his wife M. Ravn, their three children (aged eight to 14), an apprentice, 15-year-old Ernst Hansen and one maid. Andrea Schøtt, widow of a broker (mægler), resided on the second floor with the 34-year-old unmarried woman Sophie Borger and one maid.

Frantz Diderich Jürgensen died later in 1840. The employee Niels Ferdinand Lorck was subsequently married to Jürgensen's daughter Johanne and the family's wine business was then continued by him. Johanne Marie Lorck (née Jürgensen) continued the company upon her husband's death in 1844 with her brother Hans Ludvig Jürgensen as management.

The property was home to 17 residents in three households at the time of the 1850 census. Johanne and Hans Ludvig Jørgensen resided on the ground floor with the wine merchant (employee) Emil Gabriel Brænning, one apprentice, one male servant and one maid. Louise Marie Petersen (née Togsværd), widow of a merchant trading in Iceland, resided on the first floor with her 20-year-old niece Christian Bendixen and one niece. Dorothea Juliane Mørck (née Sjøbæk, 1805–1880), widow of the gardener at the Botanical Garden Otto Josias Nicolai Mørch (1799–1842), resided on the second floor with her four children (aged eight to 21), her mother Ane Louise Sjøbek, one lodger and one maid.

Madame Lorcj's wine bar was particularly popular with the actors from the Royal Danish Theatre on the other side of Kongens Nytorv. The customers included Emil and Anna Poulsen, Olaf Poulsen and the writer Carl Møller.

=== Foght family ===
The company was taken over by Magnus Vilhelm Foght (1831–1894) in 1857. His property was home to four households at the 1860 census. Wilhelm Magnus Foght resided in the building with the wine merchant (employee, vinhandlersvend) Peter John Sørensen and one maid. Juliane Dorothea Mørck resided in the building with her daughter Emilie Dorthea Elisabeth Mørck, two lodgers, a housekeeper, one male servant and one maid. Johanne Marie Lorck was still residing in the building with her son Frantz Andreas Lorck and the lodger Johannes Frederik Meyer (architect). Peter Schram, an opera singer, resided in the building with his wife Johanne Marie Schram (née Sachmann) and their 14-year-old daughter Arpholine Frederikke Johanne Wedschoell Schram.

The company was acquired by George Lorange in 1887. In 1896, it was acquired by Detlev Frederik Schnack. Royal Danish Theatre actor and chamber singer Peter Schram resided in the apartment on the second floor of Nyavn 1 from 1860 to 1875.

=== 20th century ===
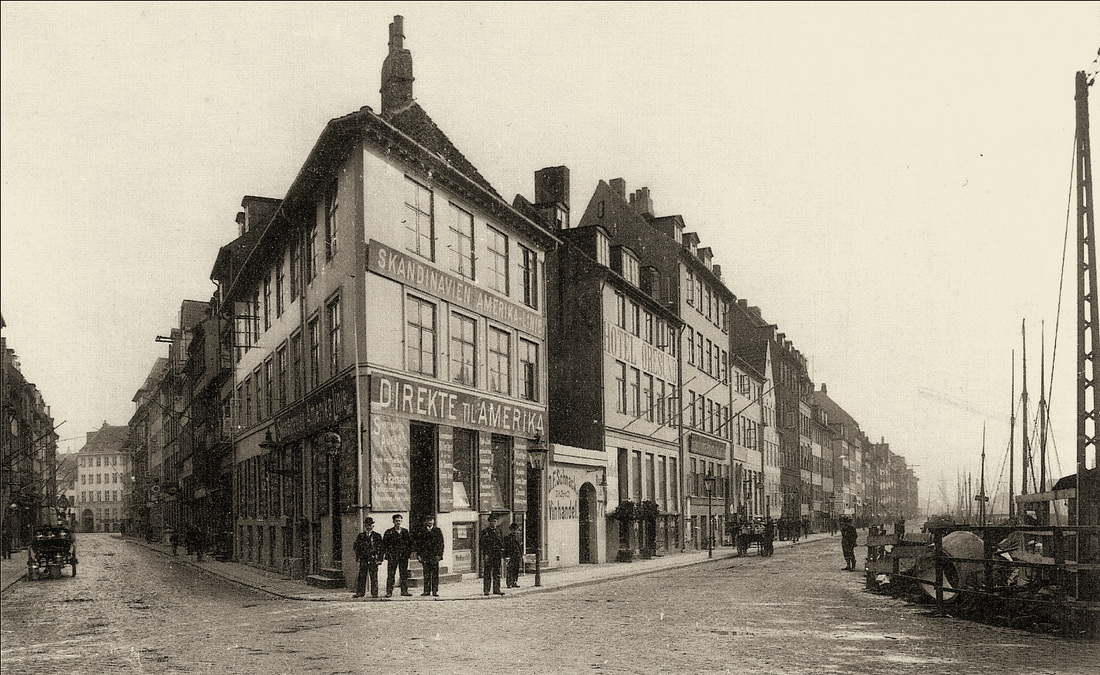
Nyhavn 1 in circa 1900 with a "Directly to America" advertisement on the facade

The Thingvalla Line and later Scandinavian America Line had their sales office in the building. The ships departed from Amerikakaj in the Freeport. For a few years, White Star Line also had a sales office at Nyhavn 1. Fourteen people, two women and 12 men, bought tickets for RMS Titanic's maiden journey. The 12 men died while the two women survived its wreck.

== Today ==
Restaurant Barock is today based in the building.

== Gallery ==
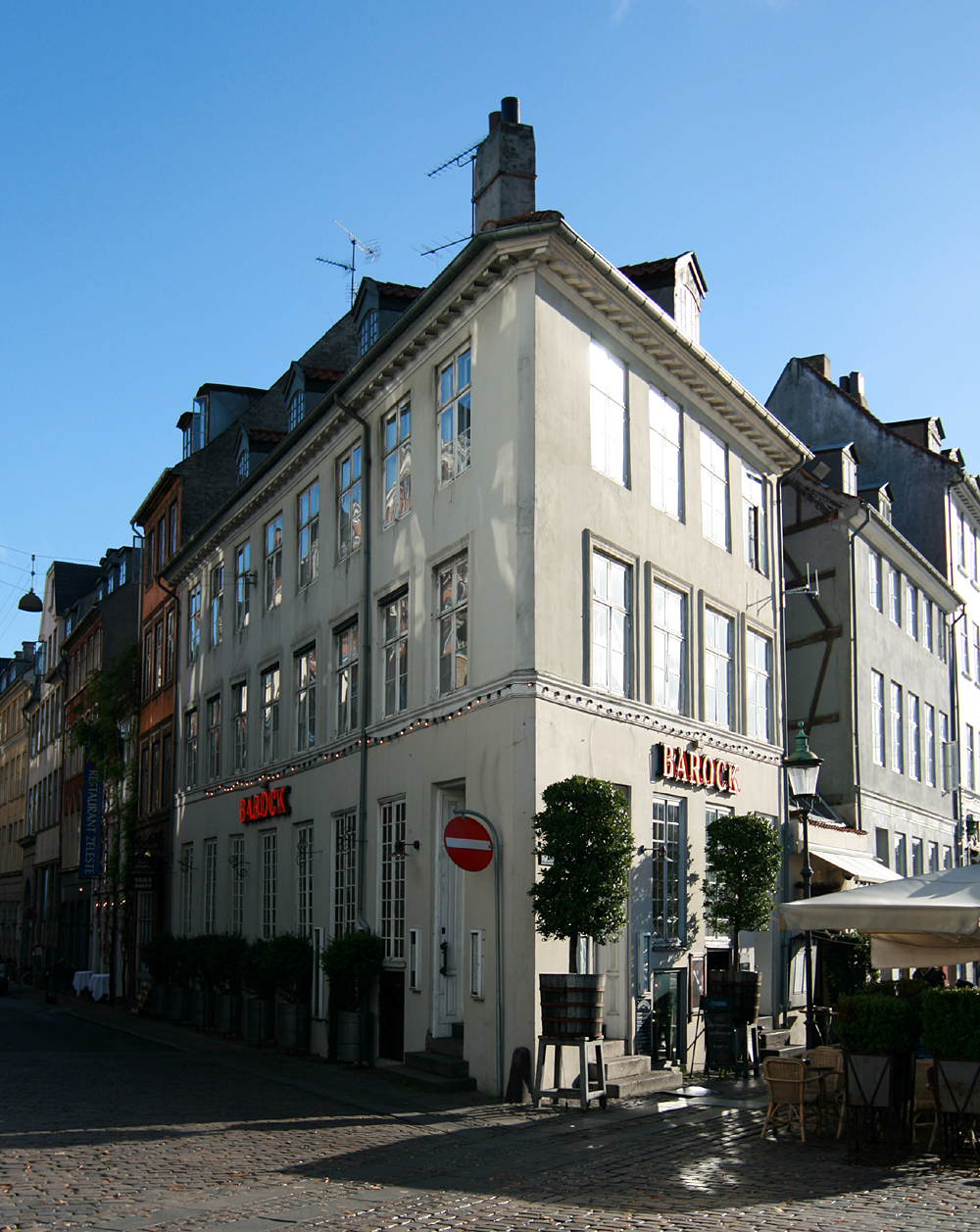
Restaurant Barock, Nyhavn 1, København. Built 1753.
