= SS Hellig Olav =

Ship built in 1903

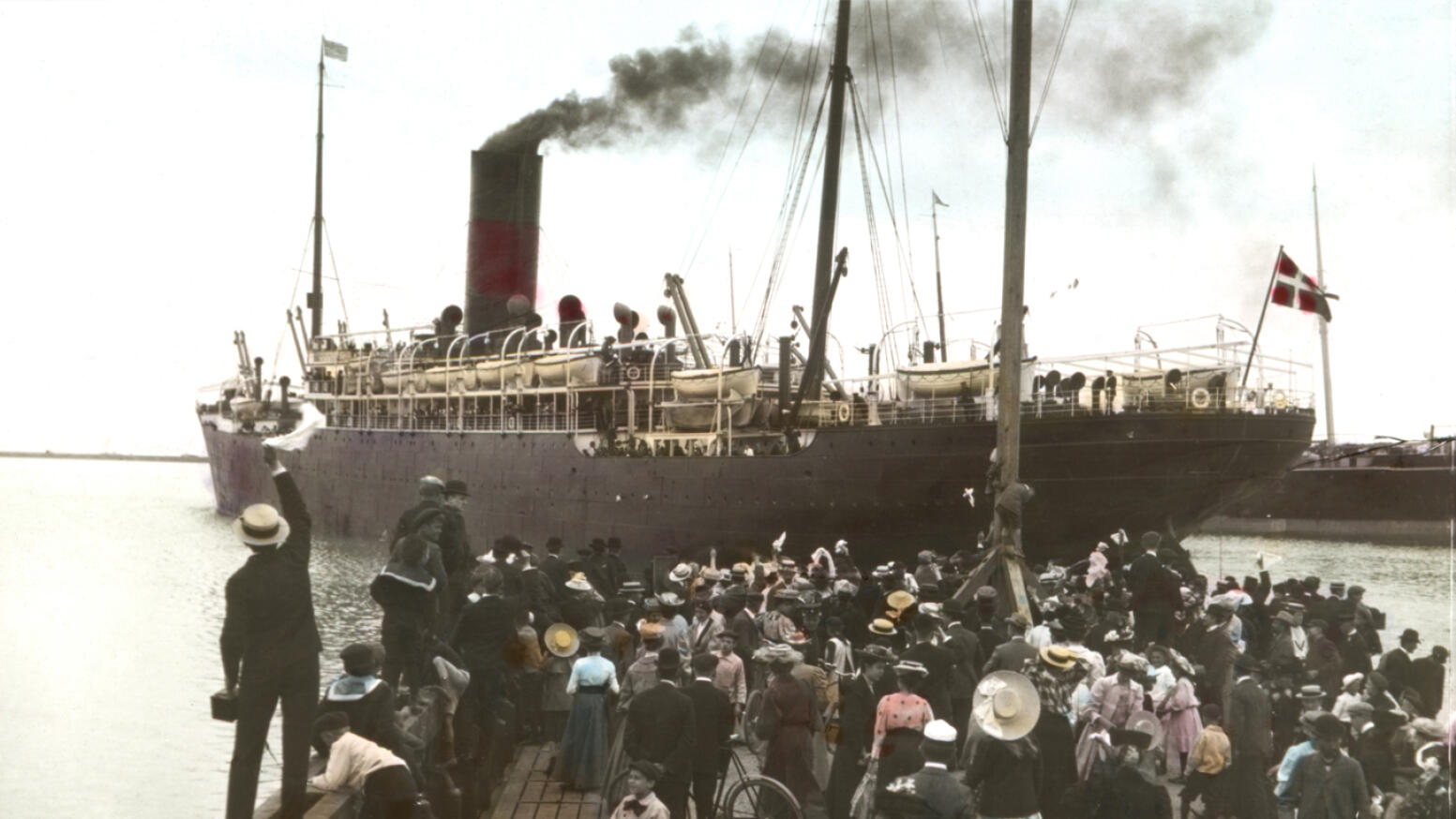
- Hellig Olav departing Copenhagen in 1910.

History
- Name: (Denmark) Hellig Olav
- Namesake: Saint Olaf
- Owner: Scandinavian America Line
- Port of registry: Copenhagen, Denmark
- Builder: Alexander Stephen and Sons
- Cost: 205,770 British pounds
- Yard number: 399
- Launched: 16 December 1902
- Completed: March 1903
- Acquired: 20 March 1903
- Maiden voyage: 25 March 1903
- In service: 25 March 1903
- Out of service: 1934
- Identification: Call sign: DHO; Signal Letters: NMFQ
- Fate: Scrapped in 1934

General characteristics
- Type: Passenger ship
- Tonnage: 10,085 GRT
- Length: 151.6 metres (497 ft 5 in)
- Beam: 17.8 metres (58 ft 5 in)
- Depth: 12.4 metres (40 ft 8 in)
- Decks: 3
- Installed power: Two triple-expansion steam engines
- Propulsion: Two screws
- Sail plan: Copenhagen - Kristiania - New York
- Speed: 15.5 knots
- Capacity: Accommodation for 1,170 passengers (130 in First class, 140 in Second class & 900 in Steerage)
- Crew: 211
- Notes: Two masts and a single funnel

SS Hellig Olav was a Danish transatlantic Passenger ship that was the first Danish ship to be installed with a wireless telegraph, and sailed the Scandinavian America Line's Copenhagen to New York route until her scrapping in 1934.

== Construction ==
Hellig Olav was built at the Alexander Stephen and Sons shipyard in Glasgow, United Kingdom. The ship was launched on 16 December 1902 before being completed in March the following year. The ship successfully conducted her sea trials on 17 March 1903 and was delivered to the Scandinavian America Line on 20 March. The ship was 151.6 metres (497 ft 5 in) long, had a beam of 17.8 metres (58 ft 5 in) and a depth of 12.4 metres (40 ft 8 in). She was assessed at 10,085 GRT and had two triple-expansion steam engines driving two screw propellers that could achieve a speed of 15.5 knots. The ship had accommodation for 1,170 passengers including 130 in First class, 140 in Second class & 900 in Steerage. Hellig Olav was also fitted with electric light and refrigerating machinery alongside a bilge keel and a double cellular bottom. The ship was divided into 10 watertight compartments. She had two sisterships: Oscar II and United States.

== Career ==
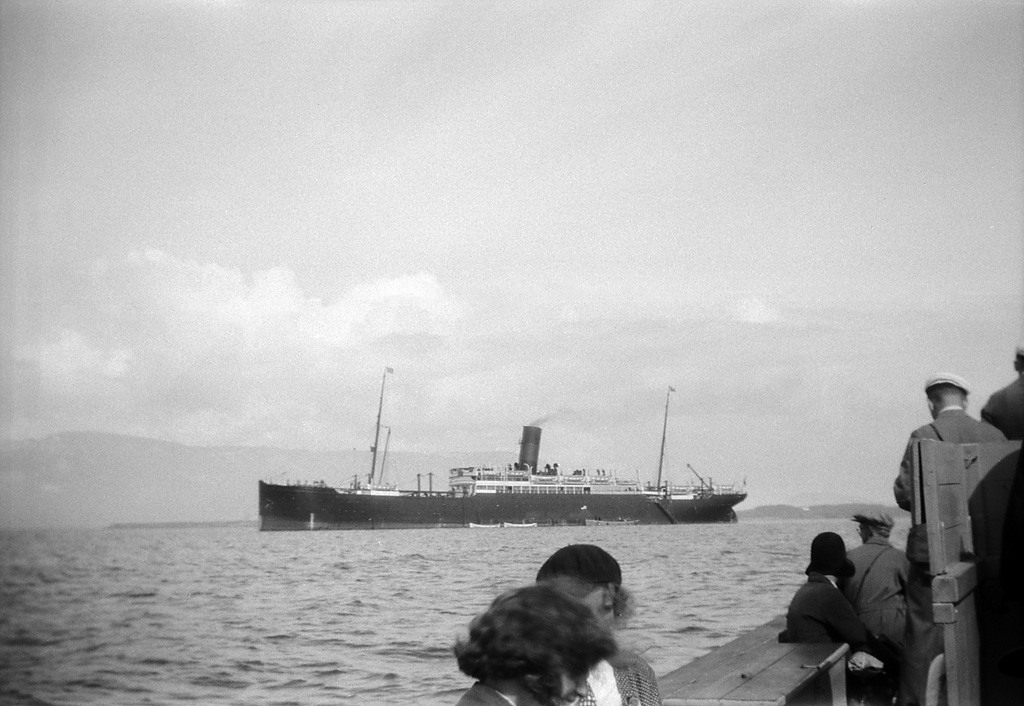
Hellig Olav at Reykjavik, Iceland in 1930.

Hellig Olav sailed on her maiden voyage under the command of Captain Holst from Copenhagen to New York with stopovers in Kristiania and Kristiansand on 25 March 1903 with about 1,500 Scandinavian passengers and crew. The ship arrived in New York without incident on 8 April and she would continue to serve on this route throughout her career. The only incident that would befall Hellig Olav occurred on 11 November 1905 at 3 am as the ship struck underwater rocks south of Anholt in Kattegat and began to take on water. The Captain ordered the pumps activated and the ship's speed slowed to half-ahead, but they could not prevent the water from rising to 4 metres (13 ft 1 in) in cargo hold No. 2 and thus the decision was made to sail to Helsingør. The ship was inspected by divers and was allowed to continue on to Copenhagen for repairs accompanied by a salvage steamer.

Hellig Olav was fitted with a wireless telegraph in 1907, becoming the first Danish ship to be installed with one. Hellig Olav was sailing for New York when at 11.20 am on 13 April 1912, the ship transmitted an ice warning to the United States Hydrographic Office in Washington D.C. after they spotted ice at their position in the North Atlantic at 41°43′N 49°15′W. The following day, the White Star Liner RMS Titanic on her maiden voyage to New York, struck an iceberg in that same area and sank, resulting in a great loss of life.

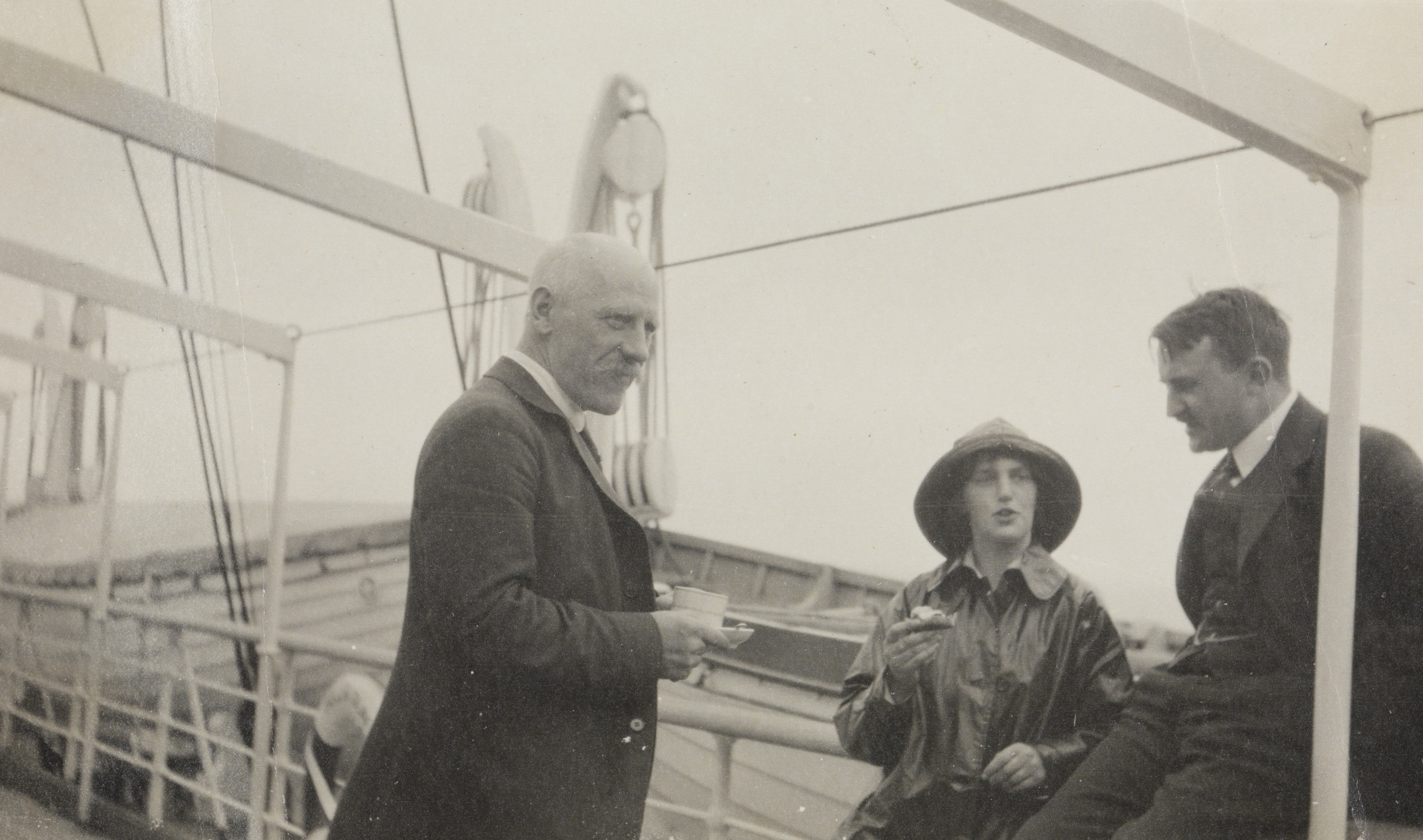
Fridtjof Nansen aboard Hellig Olav during World War I.

After the outbreak of World War I, Hellig Olav continued her passenger service to New York as Denmark remained a neutral nation during the entire conflict, but the ship was required to paint on neutrality markings as to deter any attacks from German U-boats. Despite this, the ship was laid up in New York from 29 January to 26 April 1917 and once again from 4 June to 8 October 1918. During the conflict Hellig Olav transported former Norwegian polar explorer Fridtjof Nansen alongside a Norwegian delegation to negotiate the shipment of food and other supplies to Norway as the war had led to acute food shortages in the country. Hellig Olav's normal service operations returned following the end of the war on 11 November 1918 and several changes were made to her schedule in 1920 which saw the ship halt at additional ports such as Boston and Halifax. Hellig Olav underwent a refit to her accommodations in January 1922 which eliminated Second class and therefore only catered to Cabin class and Third Class passengers until a tourist class was added in June 1927. On 21 November 1930, the fellow Scandinavian America Line's passenger ship Frederik VIII struck an underwater rock just 25 minutes after departing Copenhagen, which sprang a leak and required the vessel to return to port after which Frederik VIII's passengers and mail were transferred to Hellig Olav.

== Final years ==
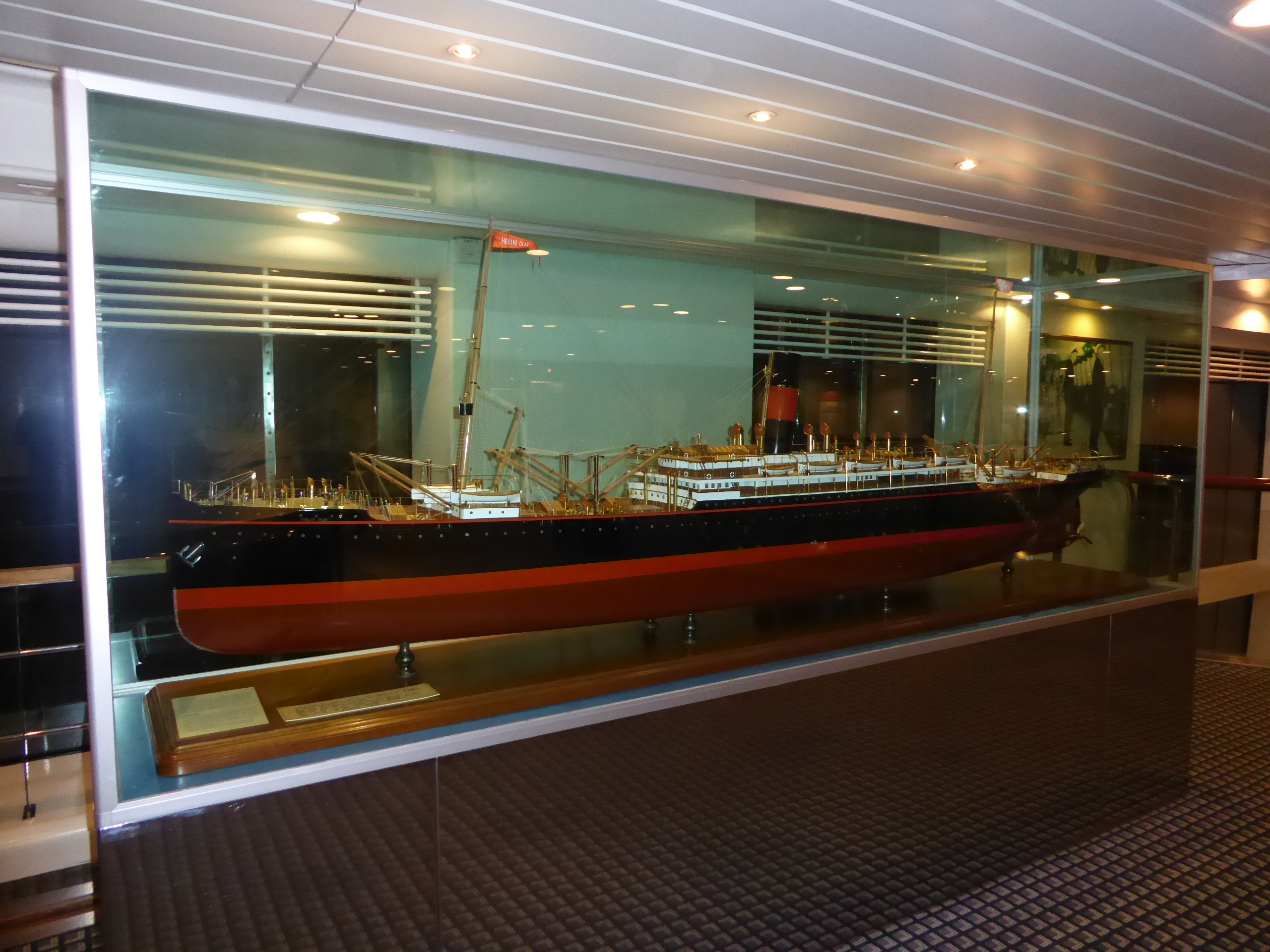
Model of Hellig Olav onboard the ferry Pearl Seaways

At the beginning of 1931, Hellig Olav's sistership Oscar II was laid up as the Scandinavian America Line saw a decline in passenger numbers, and as the situation only declined further, it was decided to retire Hellig Olav as well as there just weren't enough passengers to fill up Hellig Olav, her sistership United States and the line's largest liner Frederik VIII. Hellig Olav departed New York on her final transatlantic voyage on 23 September 1931 and arrived in Copenhagen on 7 October, after which she was laid up until she was sold to the Hughes Bolckow Shipbreaking Co. Ltd. on 5 March 1934. Hellig Olav left Copenhagen under her own power for the scrapyard at Blyth, United Kingdom on 9 March 1934, where she arrived on 14 March. Her scrapping commenced on 10 October 1934.

== Gallery ==
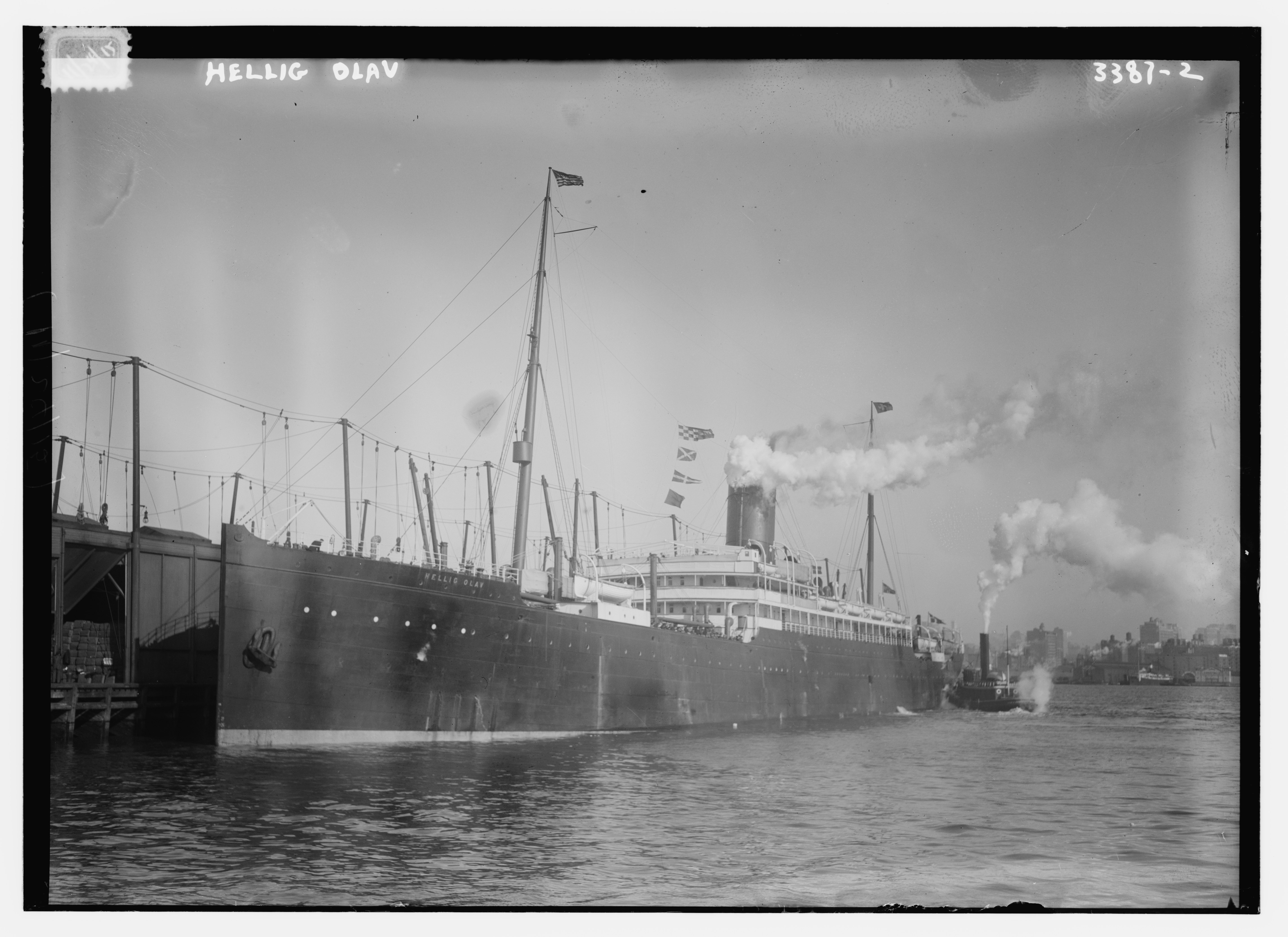
Hellig Olav in 1910

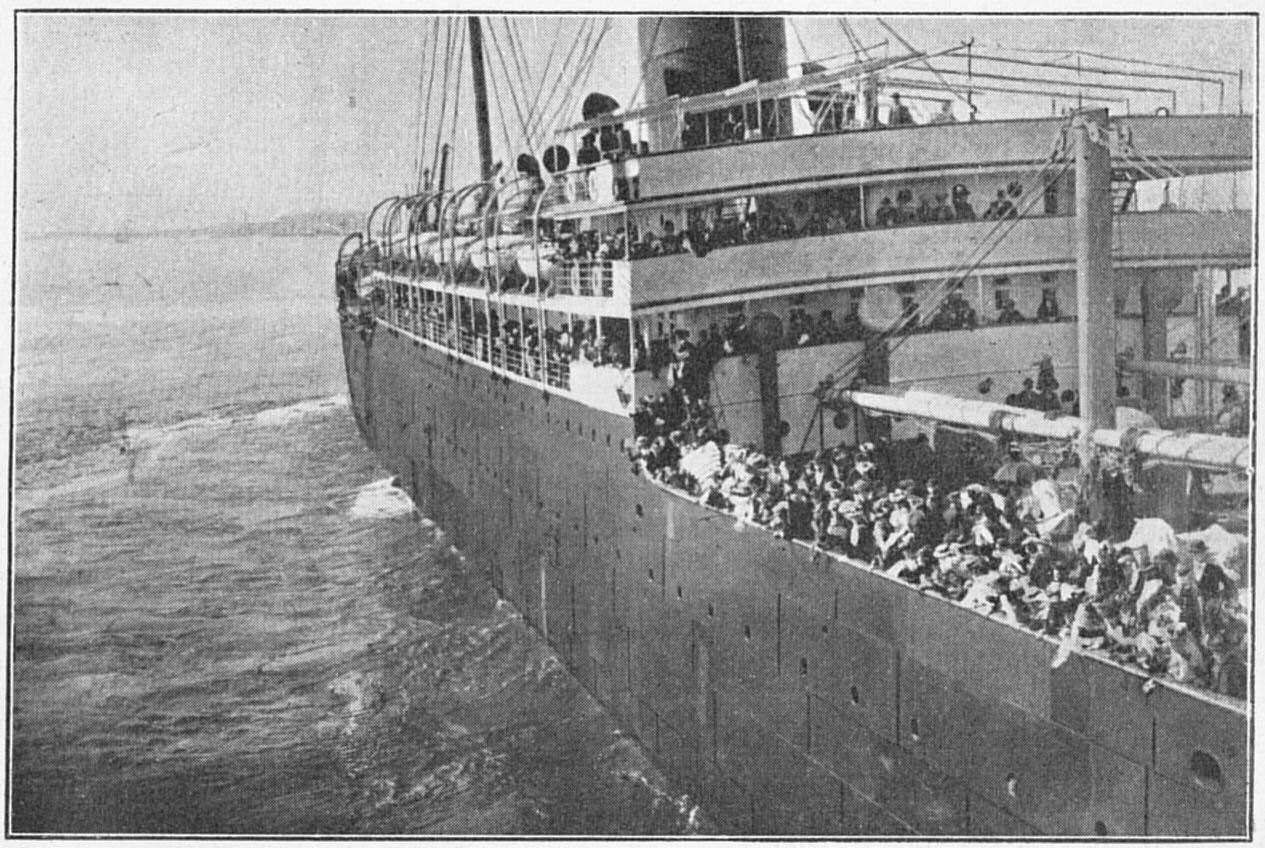
Hellig Olav in 1905

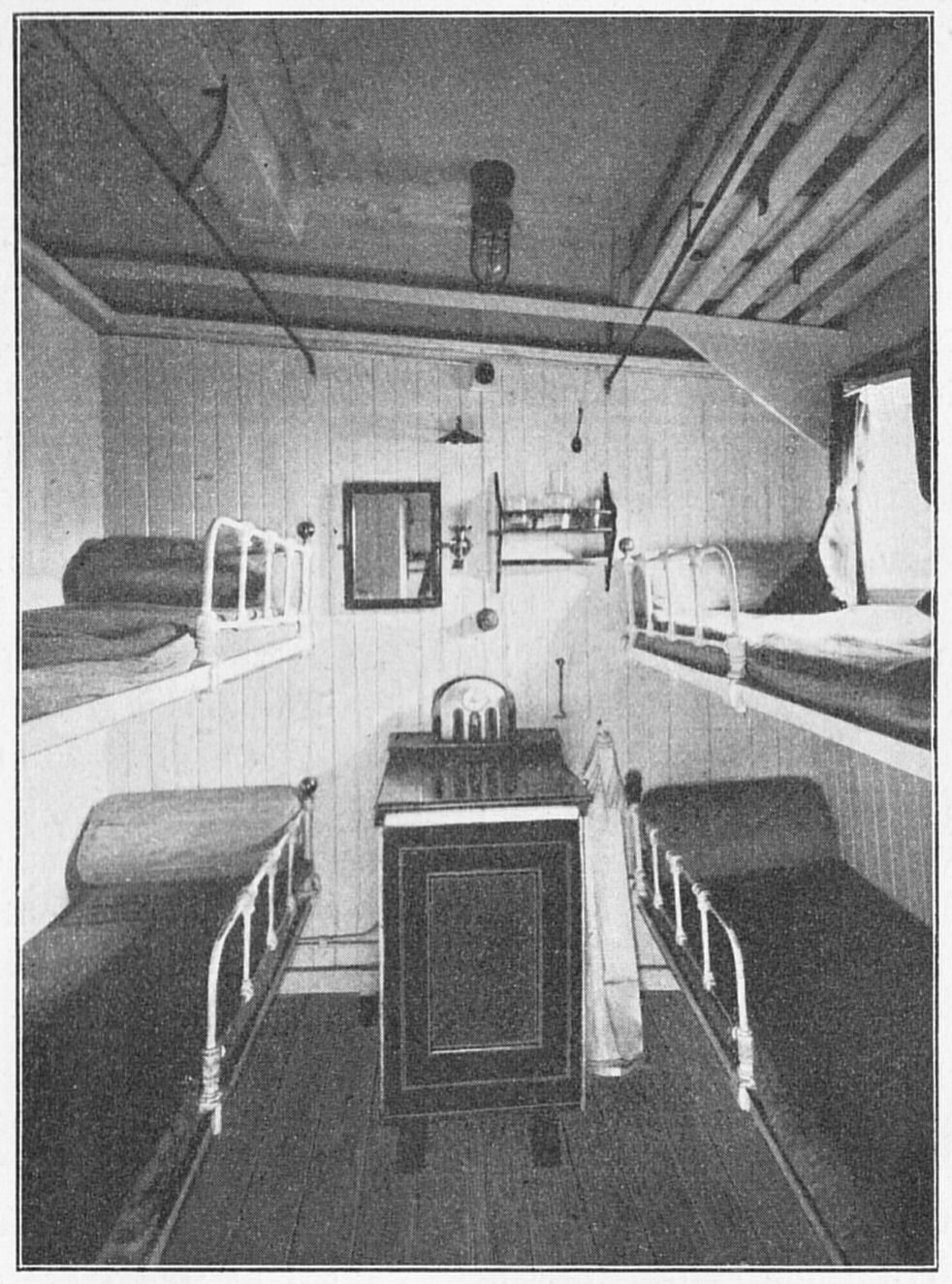
Third Class cabin on Hellig Olav in 1905

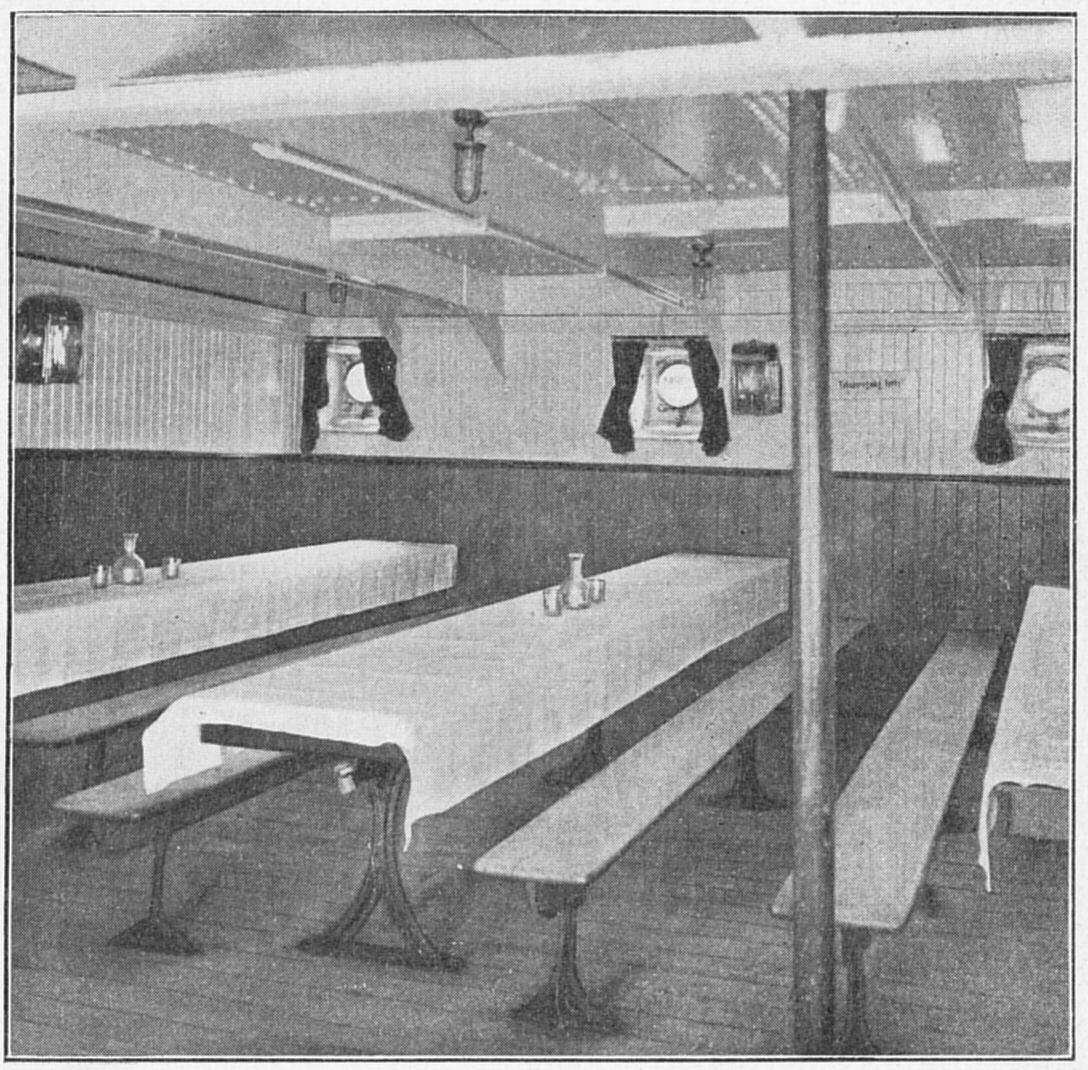
Third Class Dining room on Hellig Olav in 1905

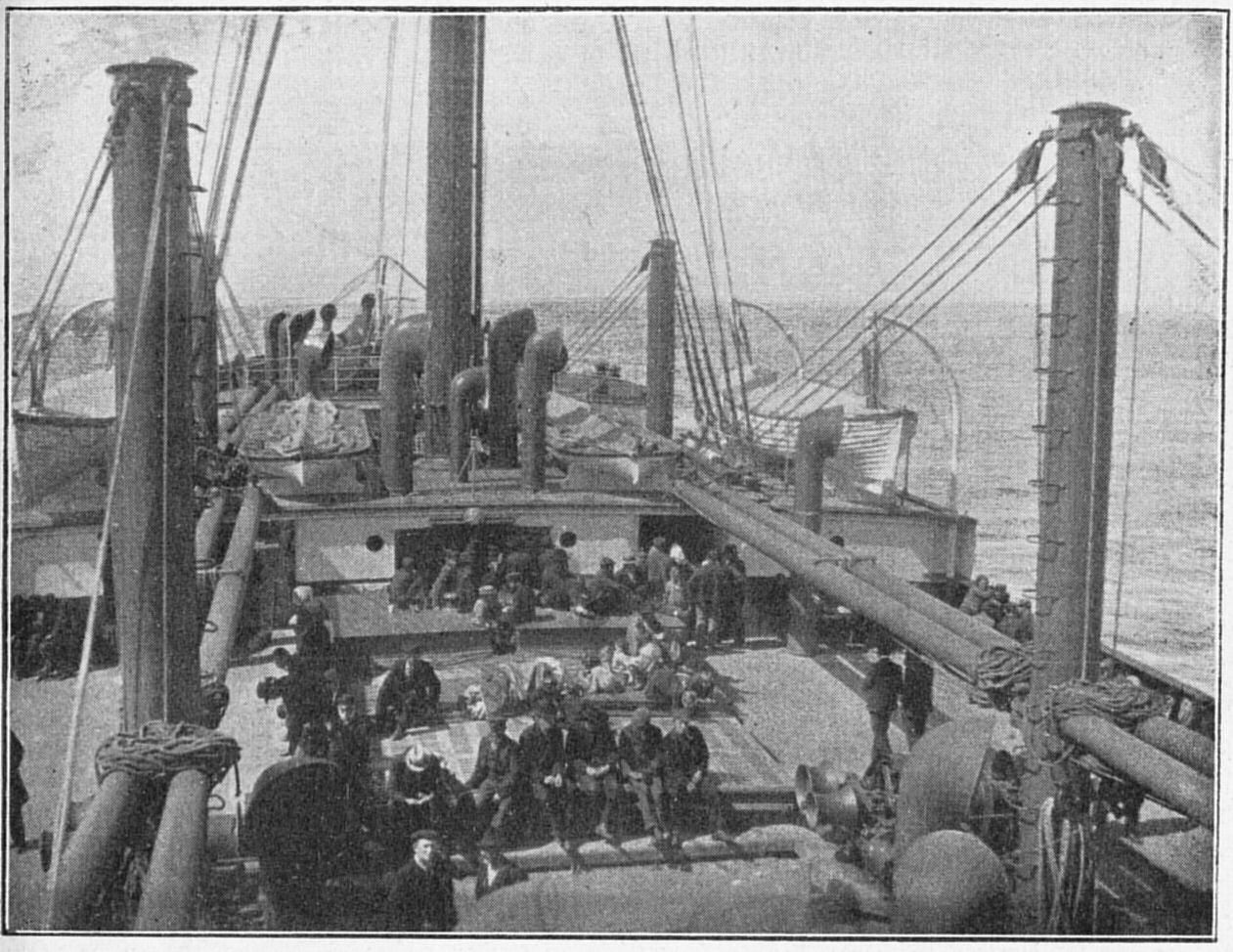
Third Class promenade on Hellig Olav in 1905

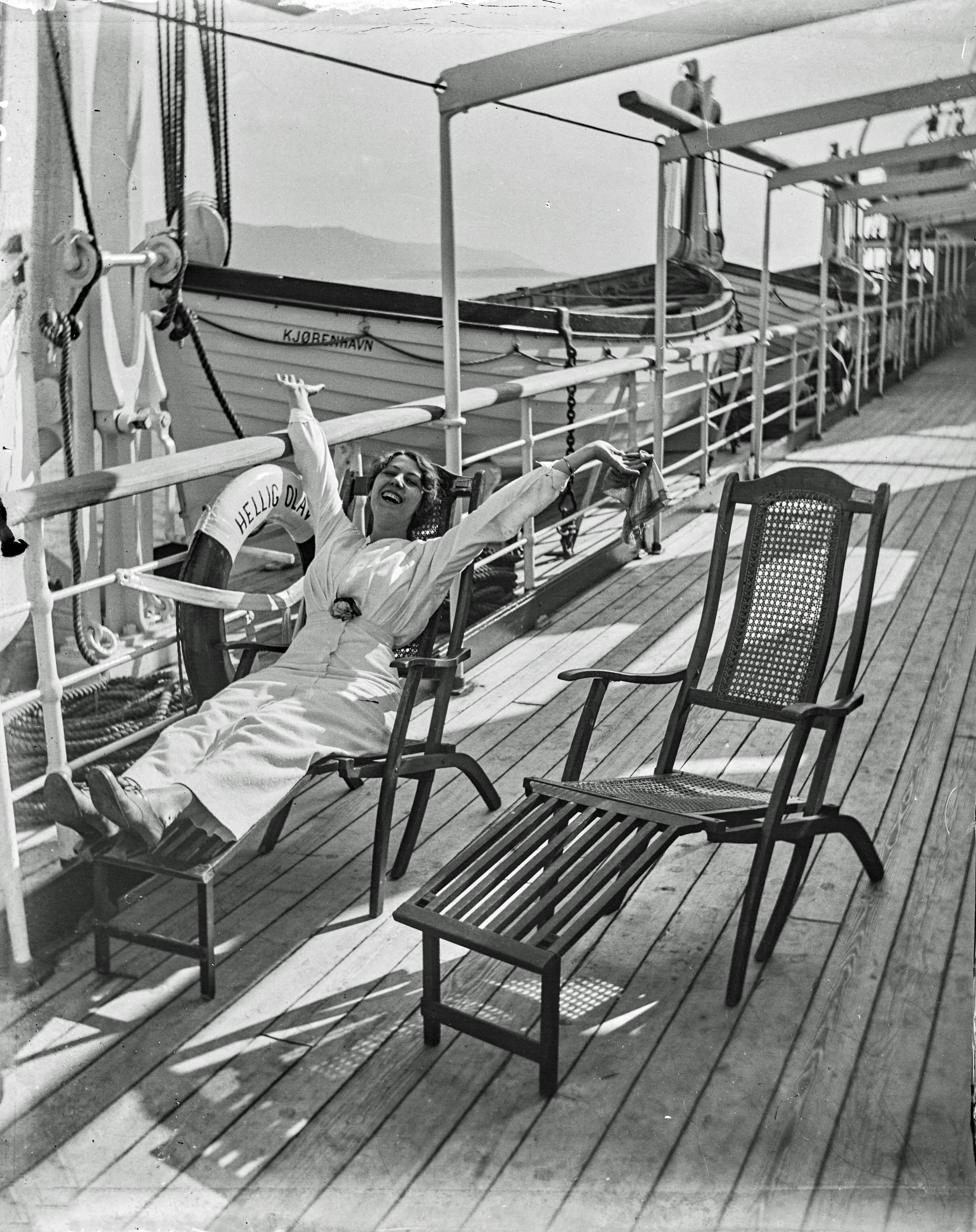
Boat deck of Hellig Olav
