= USS United States =

USS United States may refer to:

- USS United States (1797) was one of the original six frigates that served from 1798 until 1865.
- USS United States (CC-6) was a Lexington-class battlecruiser canceled and scrapped when the vessel was only 12 percent complete.
- USS United States (CVA-58) was an aircraft carrier canceled five days after her keel was laid down in 1949. The ship would have been the lead ship under the United States-class aircraft carrier.
- SS United States was an ocean liner designed to operate as USS/USNS United States as a troop transport or hospital ship.
- USS United States was to be the eighth Nimitz-class aircraft carrier but was renamed USS Harry S. Truman (CVN-75) in 1995.

== See also ==
- SS United States
- USS America
- List of ships named United States
