= José Buscaglia Guillermety =

Puerto Rican sculptor

José Buscaglia-Guillermety
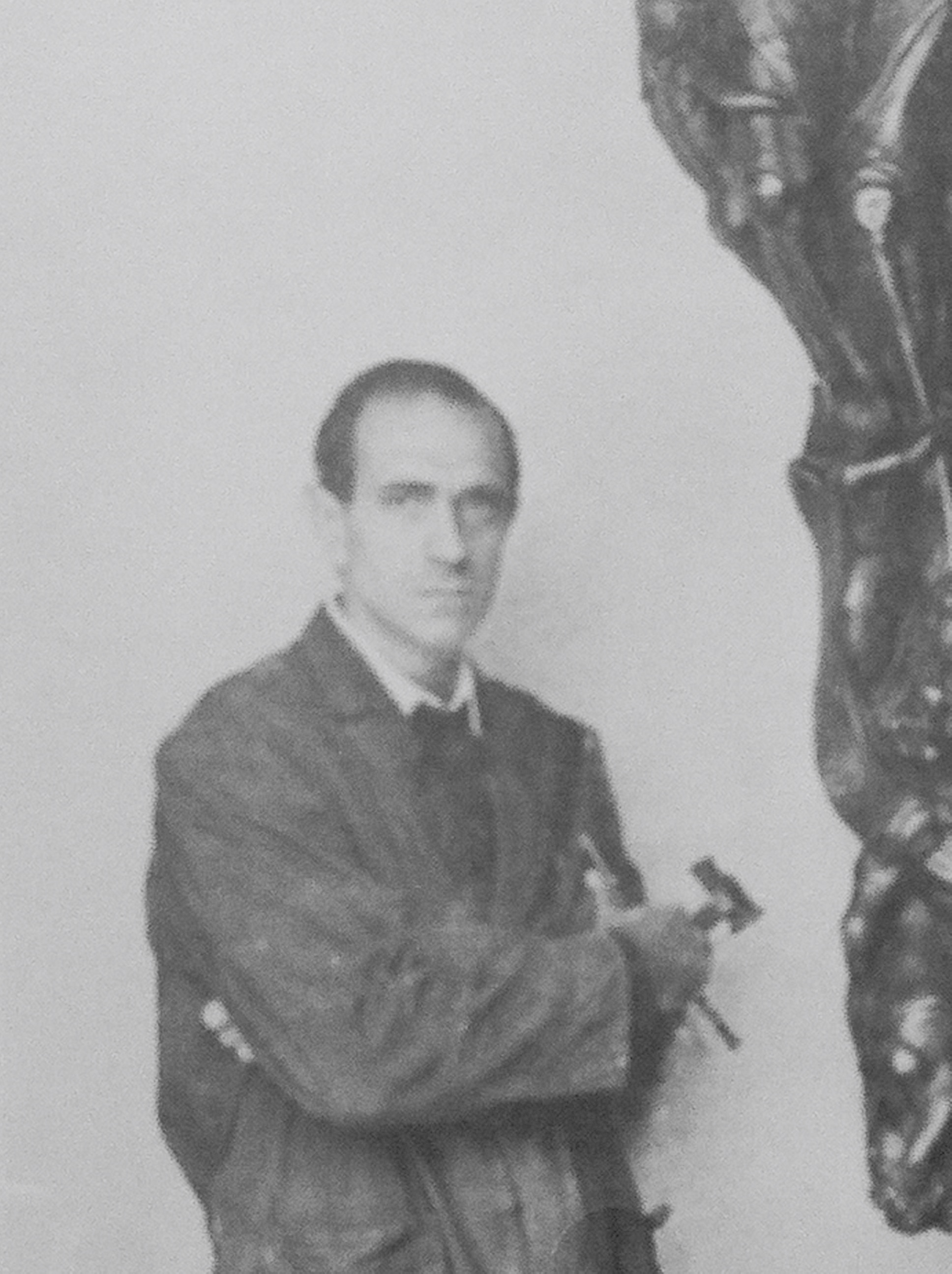
- José Buscaglia Guillermety
- Born: 1938 (age 87–88); San Juan, Puerto Rico
- Known for: Sculptor and Educator
- Notable work: Jesus T. Piñero; Roberto Cofresí; Roberto Clemente; Eugenio María de Hostos
- Awards: "Artistic Excellence Award"

José Buscaglia Guillermety (born 1938) is an educator and sculptor. He is a Fellow of the National Sculptor Society and a founding member of the Academy of Arts and Sciences of Puerto Rico.

== Background ==
Buscaglia was born in San Juan, Puerto Rico. His father Rafael Buscaglia was a lawyer, banker and an influential political figure within the ranks of The Popular Democratic Party of Puerto Rico. Besides being one of the co-founders of the party and the founder of the Banco Gubernamental of Fomento, he also held the cabinet position of Treasurer. Buscaglia's mother, Josefina Guillermety, was a student of noted opera singer Antonio Paoli.

The family lived in the Santurce neighborhood of San Juan and also had a farm in Comerío, a town located in the central mountains of the island. There he came into constant contact with nature and peasant culture. On one occasion when he was six years old, his father went on a trip to New York City and brought back a box of modeling clay as a gift for his young son. Young José became fascinated with the gift and started to model human figures with it. His father recognized that his young son had a talent for sculpting and in 1946 enrolled him in an arts school where he was to take lessons from Ismael D'Alzina. After attending his regular school, he would go to the arts school and take six hours of sculpting classes per day.

== Education ==
Buscaglia received his primary and secondary education at the Sacred Heart Academy of Santurce graduating in 1956. He then attended Harvard University where he was the first person to receive a Bachelors in Fine Arts (1960). He spent his junior year abroad in Barcelona, Spain where he became a disciple of Catalan sculptor Enrique Monjo. After graduating from Harvard he returned to Spain to complete his apprenticeship with Monjo.

== Professional career ==
Buscaglia returned to Puerto Rico in 1962 and was commissioned by the Government of Puerto Rico to erect a monument in the likeness of the late governor Jesus T. Piñero. He was hired by the University of Puerto Rico and held the position of Director of Fine Arts at various periods between 1962 and 1979.

In 1979 he was instrumental in the development and design of an experimental program, sponsored by the Venezuelan Government and Harvard University, that became known as Project Intelligence.

=== Main Sculptural Works ===
Buscaglia has created over forty monuments which can be found in Puerto Rico, the U.S. Virgin Islands and the United States. His works have been exhibited at Yale University, Harvard University, Rockefeller Center, the U.S. Department of Education in Washington, D.C., Hostos Community College in New York City, Barcelona and Madrid.

His principal works include:

- Jesus T. Piñero (1962)
- Robert Frost (1963)
- John F. Kennedy (1969)
- Death Mask of Pablo Casals (1973)
- Statue of Justice (1973)
- Statue of Santiago Iglesias Pantín (1977)
- Roberto Cofresí (1989)
- Roberto Clemente (1996)
- Eugenio María de Hostos (1998)
- Puerto Rican Family Monument (2009)
- Altar de la Patria (dedicated in 2012)

== Awards ==
On July 31, 2004, In Providence, Rhode Island, the Puerto Rican Day Parade and Festival Organization presented José Buscaglia Guillermety with the "Artistic Excellence Award".

== Relations ==
Buscaglia is married to Inés Salgado Nieves (San Juan, 1940) and has five children: José, Rafael (1965-2017), Gian Carlo, Gina María, and Piero. José Francisco Buscaglia is a writer, and a full professor (retired) in the Department of Cultures, Societies and Global Studies at Northeastern University in Boston. Gian Carlo Buscaglia is a prominent Latin musician, composer, singer and guitarist in the Boston metropolitan area.

== See also ==
- List of Puerto Ricans
