= The United States of America (disambiguation) =

The United States of America is a country located mainly in North America.

The United States of America may also refer to:

- The United States of America (band), an experimental rock band
  - The United States of America (album), a 1968 album by the band
- The United States of America (film), 1975 film

== See also ==
- United Stats of America, 2012 documentary
- United States (disambiguation)
- United States of North America (disambiguation)
- America (disambiguation)
- American republic (disambiguation)
- USA (disambiguation)
