= United Kingdoms =

United Kingdoms may refer to:

- United Kingdoms of Denmark–Norway
- United Kingdoms of Denmark–Norway–Sweden
- United Kingdoms of Sweden and Norway
- United Kingdoms (album), an album by Ultramarine

== See also ==
- United Kingdom (disambiguation)
