= United Provinces =

United Provinces may refer to:

- United Provinces of the Netherlands or the Dutch Republic (1581–1795), confederal republic and predecessor state to the Netherlands
- United Provinces of New Granada (1810–1816), confederacy formed after the independence of Colombia
- United Provinces of the Río de la Plata (1816–1831), union of provinces in the Río de la Plata region of South America
- United Provinces of Central America (1823–1838), former confederal republic in Central America
- United Provinces of Italy (1831), short-lived republic made up of territories of the former Papal State
- United Provinces of Central Italy (1859–1860), short-lived client state of Piedmont-Sardinia
- United Provinces of Agra and Oudh (1902–1937), a former province of British India
- United Provinces (1937–1950), former province of British India and India that later became the Indian states of Uttar Pradesh and Uttarakhand
  - United Provinces Circuit, former Hindi film distribution circuit in India

== See also ==
- United Province of Canada
- United Kingdom (disambiguation)
- United States (disambiguation)
