= Johan Wilhelm Hempel =

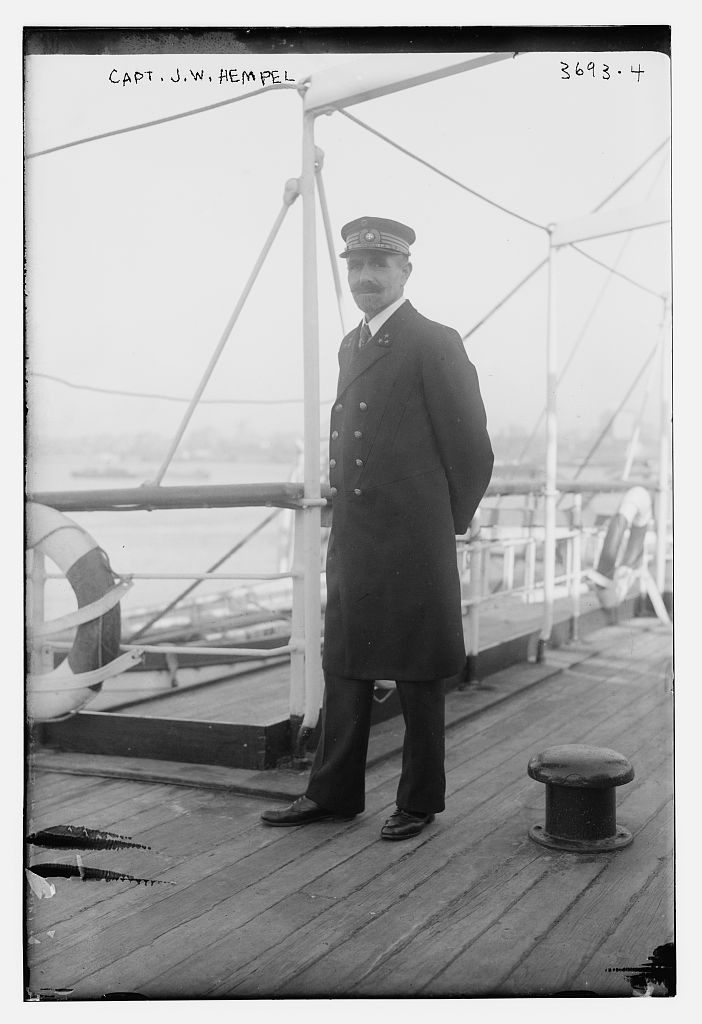
Captain William Hempel in 1915

Captain Johan Wilhelm Hempel (July 20, 1860 – January 16, 1920) was the captain of the Peace Ship.

== Biography ==
He was born on July 20, 1860, to Nielsine Agnete Christine Møller and Simon Christian Ludvig Hempel in Copenhagen, Denmark. He had a brother, Captain Christian Ludvig Hans Hempel (1862-1937).

He married Ophelia Maren Abelone Christensen on May 28, 1902, in Copenhagen.

He joined the Scandinavian America Line in 1880. In 1903 he was the captain of the Thingvalla Line ship SS Kekla. In 1904 he became the captain of the Peace Ship of Henry Ford.

He died on January 16, 1920, in Copenhagen following an operation.
