= Peter Schram =

Danish opera singer and actor

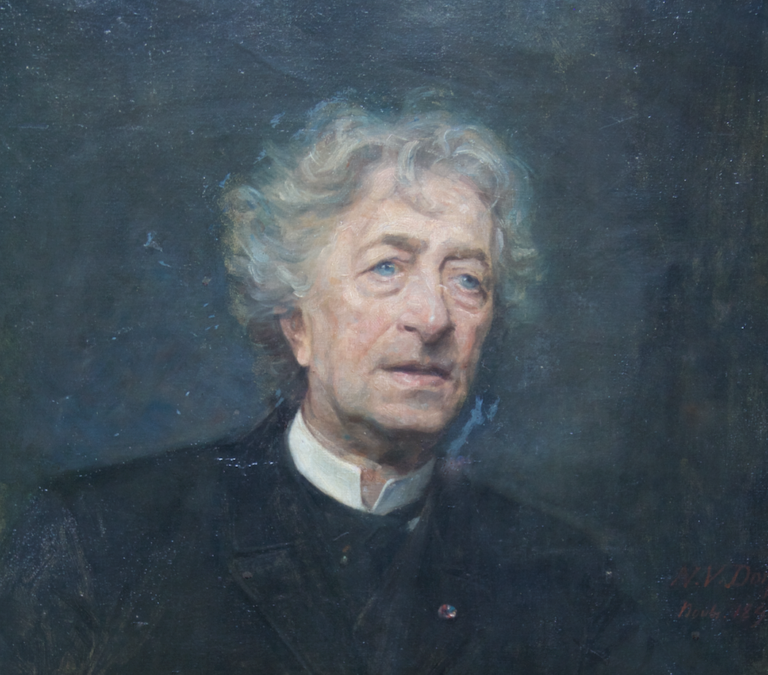
Peter Schram

Peter Ludvig Nicolai Schram (5 September 1819 - 1 July 1895) was a Danish opera singer and actor.

== Early life and education ==
Schram was born on 5 September 1819 in Copenhagen, the son of grocer Lauritz Fussing Schram (1778–1830) and Marie Sophie Schram née Wexschall (1795–1866). His mother was a sister of the prominent violinist Friderich Thorkildsen Wexschall. He played four instruments before his confirmation and attended Giuseppe Siboni's music school at the Royal Danish Theatre from 1831. Carl Winsløw taught the 14-year-old boy natural declamation of verse (contrary to N. P. Nielsens's more declamatory style), J. P. E. Hartmann taught him music theory and Siboni worked with his voice before Henrik Rung and later Manuel Garcia completed his training.

Schram made his stage debut at the Royal Danish Theatre on 2 April 1834 in a student performance alongside Betty Smidth and Carl Hagen.

== Career ==
Schram had his debut in 1841. He was appointed to Kongelige Kammersangere in 1866.

== Death ==
Schram died in Copenhagen in 1895, aged 75.
