= SS Frederik VIII =

Danish ocean liner (launched 1913)

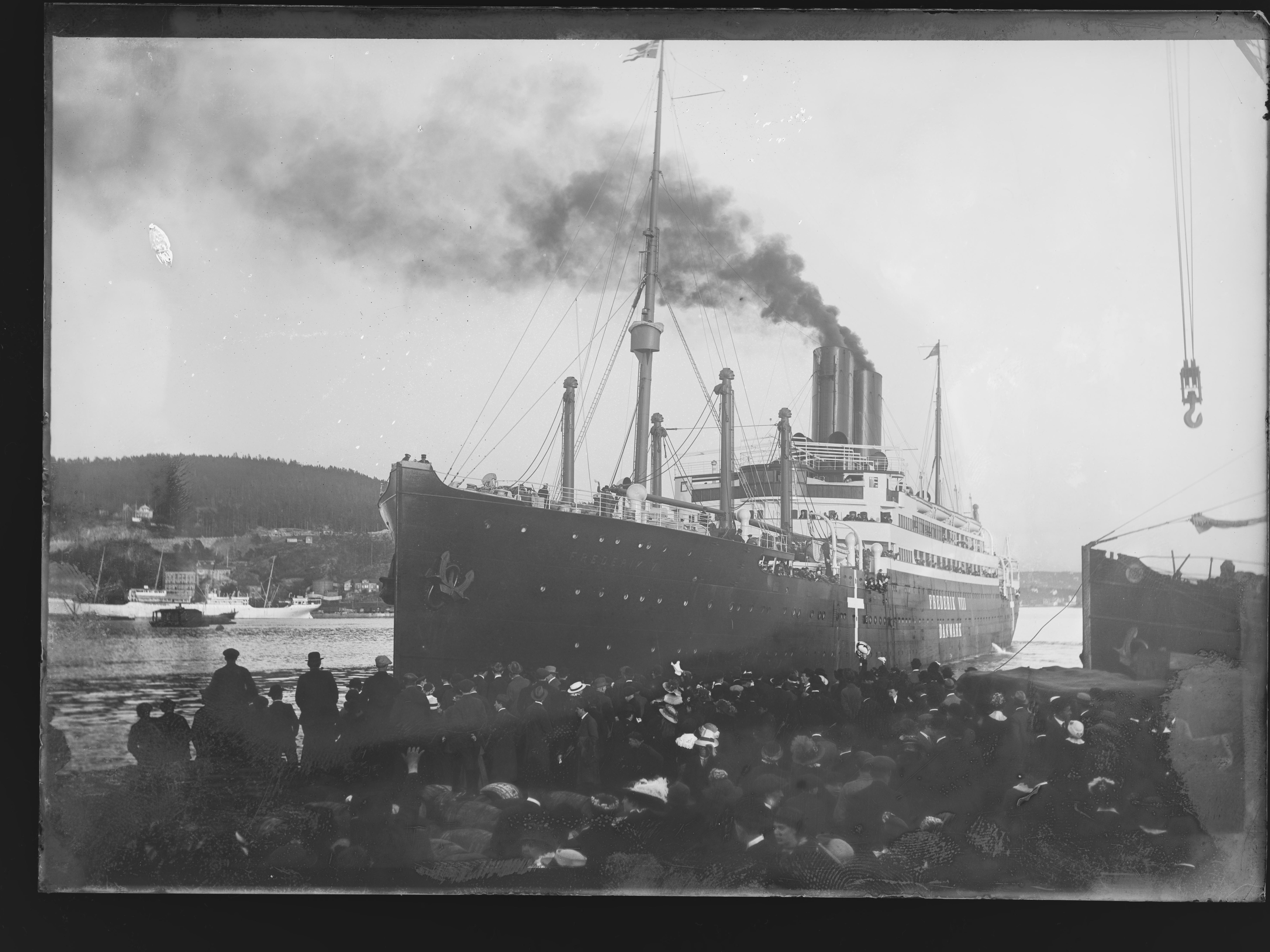
- Frederik VIII docked in Kristiania in 1916.

History
- Name: (Denmark) Frederik VIII
- Namesake: Frederick VIII of Denmark
- Owner: Scandinavian America Line
- Port of registry: Copenhagen, Denmark
- Ordered: December 1910
- Builder: AG Vulcan Stettin
- Cost: 5.5 million kroner
- Yard number: 332
- Laid down: 27 September 1912
- Launched: 27 May 1913
- Completed: 21 December 1913
- Acquired: 27 December 1913
- Maiden voyage: 5 February 1914
- In service: 5 February 1914
- Out of service: 1936
- Identification: Official number: 5603520
- Fate: Scrapped in 1936

General characteristics
- Type: Passenger ship
- Tonnage: 11,850 GRT
- Length: 159.55 metres (523 ft 5 in)
- Beam: 18.99 metres (62 ft 4 in)
- Decks: 3
- Installed power: Two 4-Cyl. steam engines
- Propulsion: Two screws
- Sail plan: Copenhagen - Kristiania - Kristiansand - New York
- Speed: 17 knots
- Capacity: Accommodation for 1,261 passengers (121 in First class, 259 in Second class & 881 in Steerage)
- Crew: 245
- Notes: Two masts and two funnels

SS Frederik VIII was a Danish transatlantic ocean liner that was the largest passenger ship in Scandinavia at the time of its commissioning, and sailed the Scandinavian America Line's Copenhagen to New York route until her scrapping in 1936.

== Construction ==
Frederik VIII was ordered in December 1910 and the keel was laid down on 27 September 1912 at the AG Vulcan Stettin shipyard in Stettin, Germany. The ship was launched on 27 May 1913 before being completed on 21 December 1913, after she successfully conducted her sea trails which started on 17 December. The ship was 159.55 metres (523 ft 5 in) long and had a beam of 18.99 metres (62 ft 4 in). She was assessed at 11,850 GRT and had two 4-Cyl. steam engines driving two screw propellers that could achieve a speed of 17 knots. The ship had accommodation for 1,261 passengers including 121 in First class, 259 in Second class & 881 in Steerage.

== Career ==
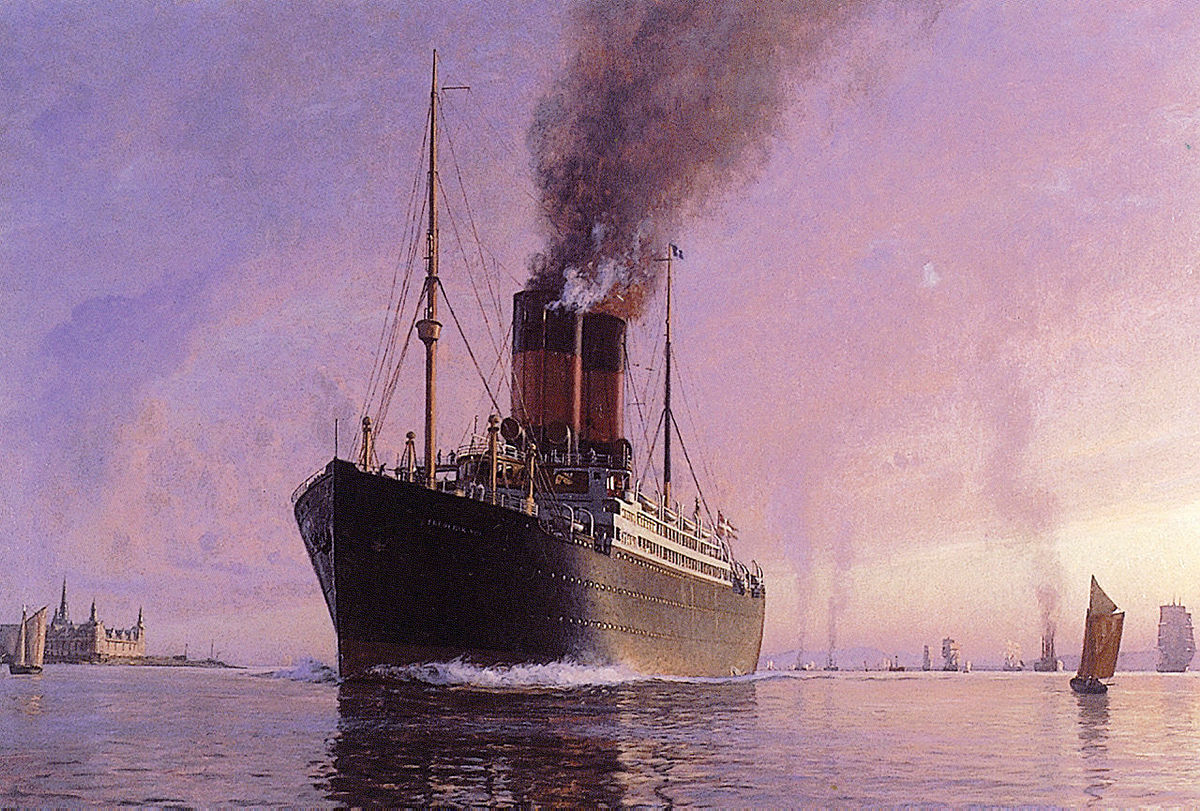
Painting of Frederik VIII at Kronborg in the Øresund in 1913 by Christian Mølsted.

Frederik VIII sailed on her maiden voyage from Copenhagen to New York with stopovers in Kristiania and Kristiansand on 5 February 1914 as the largest passenger ship in Scandinavia. The voyage went without incident, although she had to make a brief stop at Ponta Delgada in the Azores to refuel on 17 February 1914 due to an unexpectedly high coal consumption. Frederik VIII would sail this route her entire career with occasional stops in Philadelphia and Halifax, even throughout World War I as Denmark remained a neutral nation during the entire conflict. In February 1917, after the United States and the German Empire had severed diplomatic relations, former German ambassador to the United States Johann Heinrich von Bernstorff and his staff, alongside German economist Moritz Julius Bonn and his wife, returned to Europe aboard Frederik VIII. The ship would also be chartered by the British government following the end of the war on 23 November 1918, in order to repatriate British POWs from Warnemünde, Lübeck and Stettin to Kingston upon Hull. Frederik VIII ended up bringing 7,500 British prisoners of war back home across five crossings before being returned to civilian service on 18 March 1919. The ship would become the first merchant ship to be equipped with an Anschütz gyrocompass, automatic pilot and course recorder in August 1920. The automatic pilot was connected to the steering wheel by means of a bicycle chain. The Danish geographer Hans Peder Steensby died on board the ship in October 1920. Frederik VIII was involved in its first maritime incident on 23 August 1924 as the ship was departing London for Copenhagen. At 7.30 am while assisted by two tugboats at Blackwall Point on the river Thames, Frederik VIII was turning to starboard when the Royal Fusilier tried to overtake Frederik VIII. Despite evasive action from Frederik VIII which put her engines full astern, the Royal Fusilier slammed into the starboard side of Frederik VIII, resulting in minor damage to the ship. Frederik VIII was able to continue her journey at slow speed and an inquiry was held about the incident in Copenhagen on 28 August 1924. On 15 October 1925, the ship set out for a Mediterranean cruise from Copenhagen with stopovers in Lisbon, Barcelona, Monaco, Genoa, Naples, Palermo, Algiers and Gibraltar. Amongst her complement on the cruise was Danish Crown Prince Frederik.

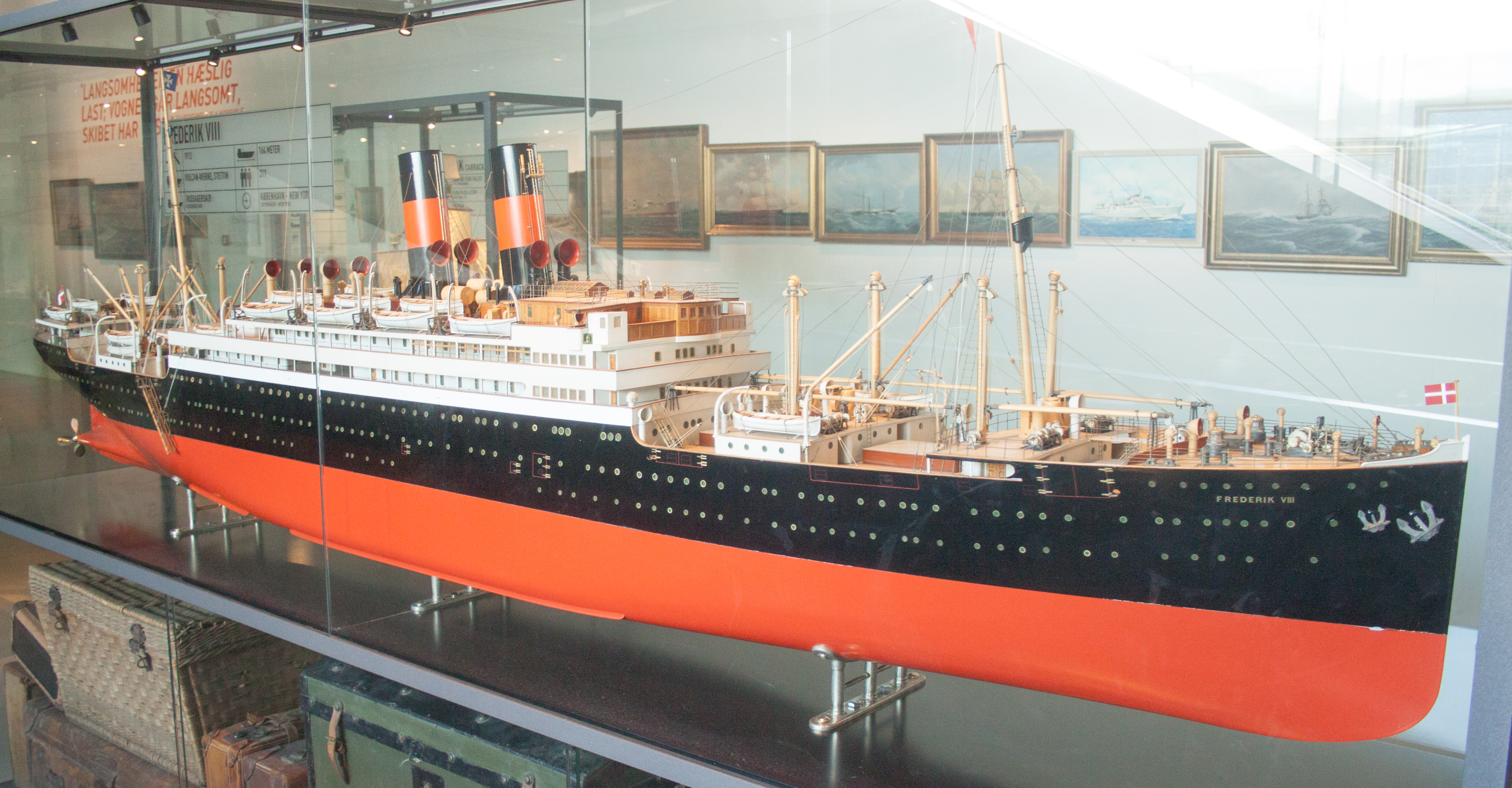
Model of Frederik VIII at the Danish Maritime Museum in Helsingør.

The ship's accommodations were refitted in November 1926 which eliminated Second class and therefore only catered to Cabin class and Third Class passengers until a tourist class was added in October 1929. Frederik VIII was involved in a second maritime incident on 21 November 1930, as she struck an underwater rock just 25 minutes after departing Copenhagen. The incident caused the ship to take on water, so she returned to port and transferred her passengers and mail to Hellig Olav. Frederik VIII departed New York for Copenhagen on 7 December 1935 on her final voyage before she would be retired from service. The voyage also marked the end of the Scandinavian America Line as the passenger and cargo service would continue under its parent company DFDS. The ship was laid up in Copenhagen from 28 December 1935 until she was sold to the Hughes Bolckow Shipbreaking Co. Ltd. for scrap on 11 November 1936. The following day, Frederik VIII was towed to Blyth, United Kingdom, where she arrived on 18 November for scrapping.

== Gallery ==
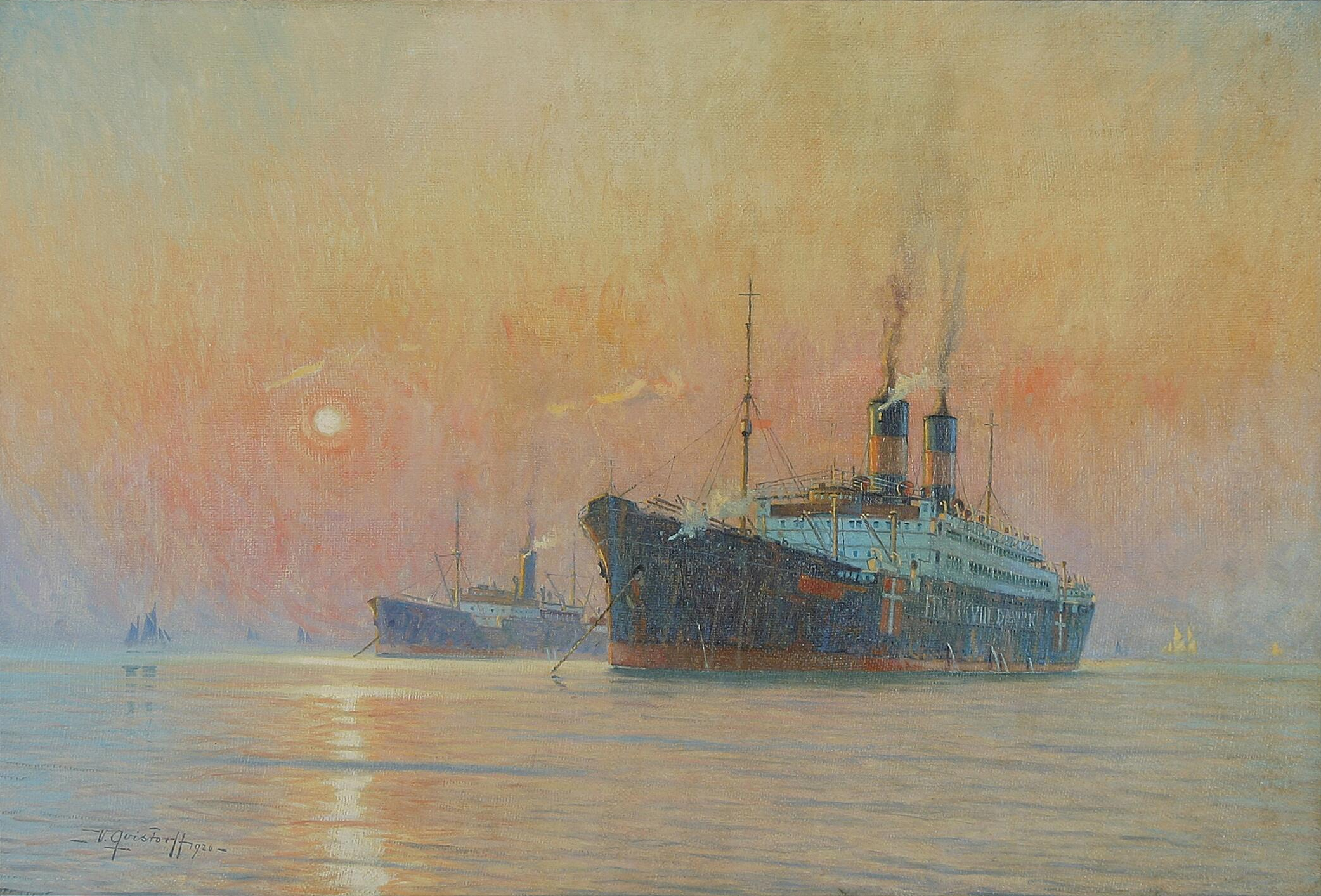
Painting of Frederik VIII carrying her neutrality markings during World War I as she was moored in Copenhagen by Victor Qvistorff.

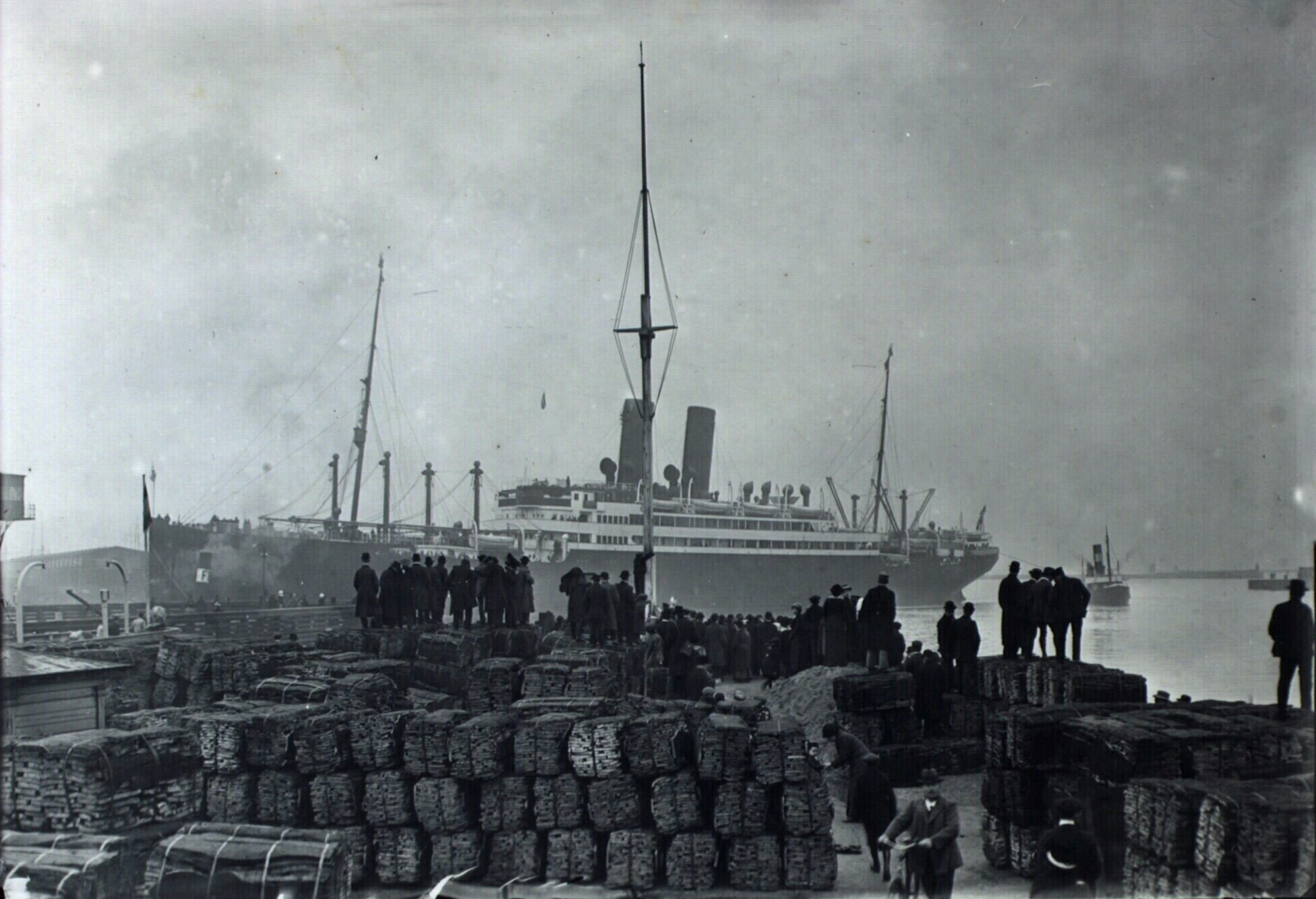
Frederik VIII on 28 October 1924.

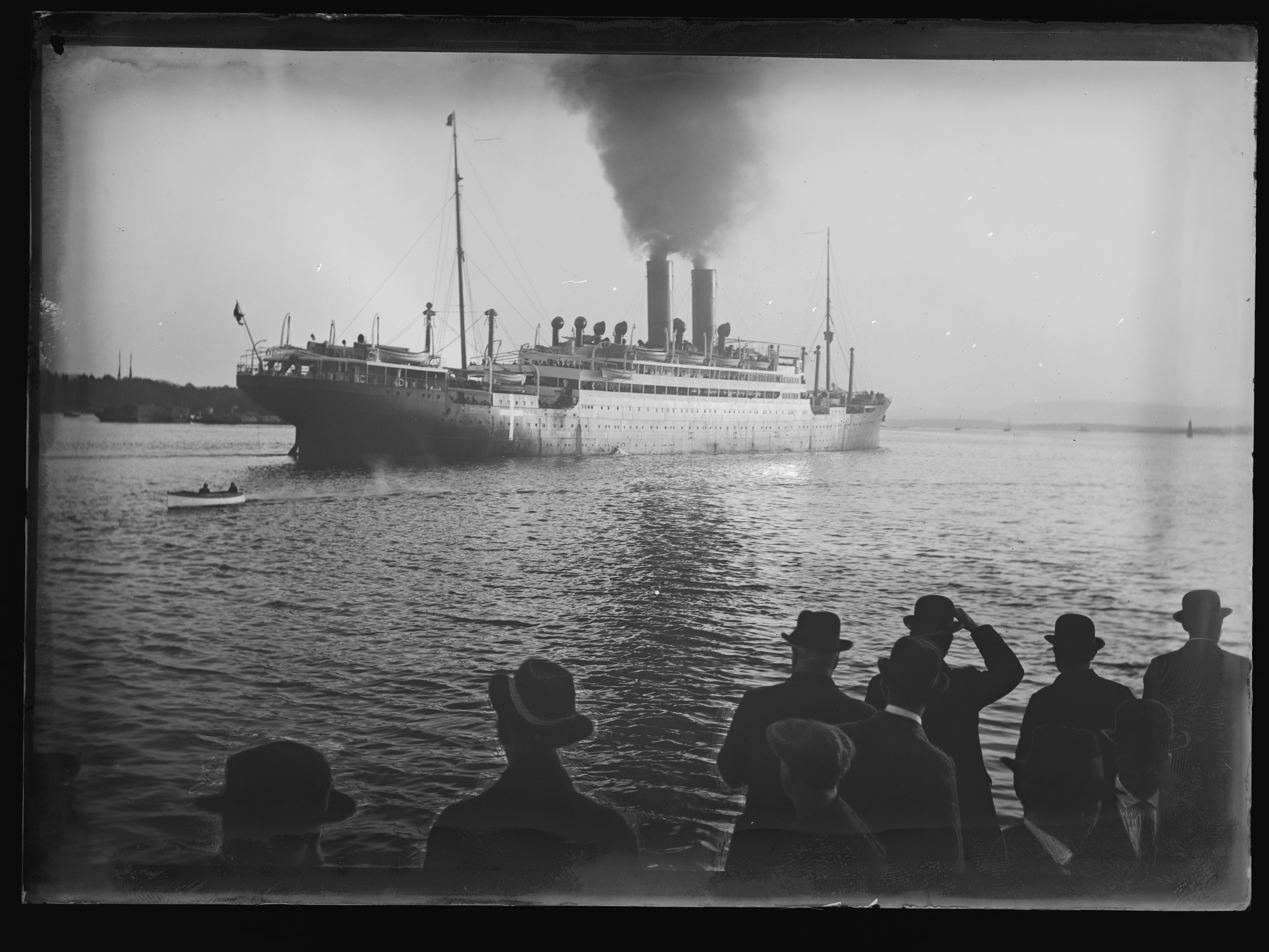
Frederik VIII in 1916.

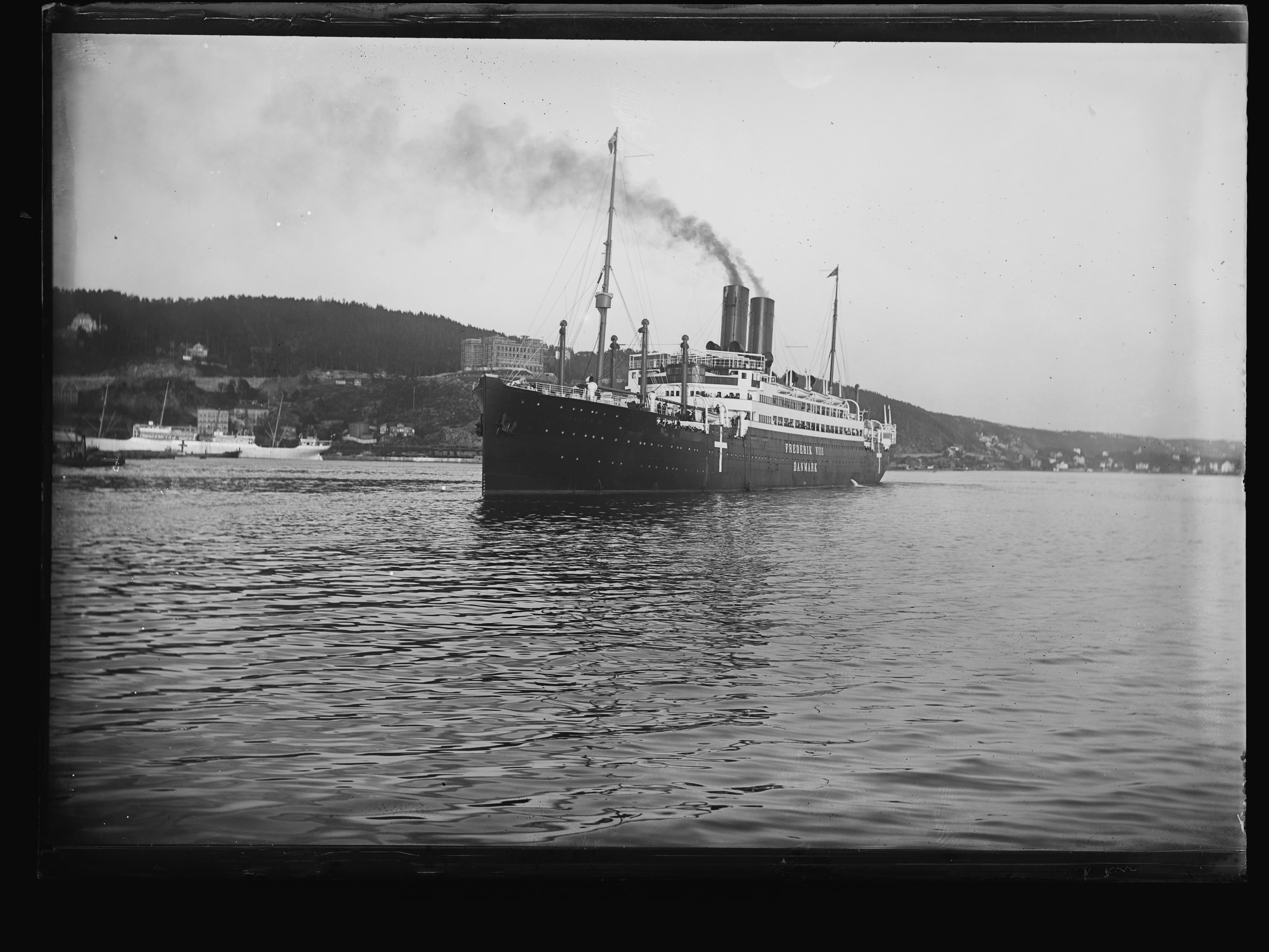
Frederik VIII during World War I.

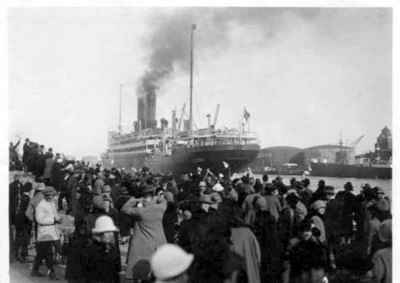
Frederik VIII departing Copenhagen in October 1925.
