= Demonyms for the United States =

Names for people from the United States

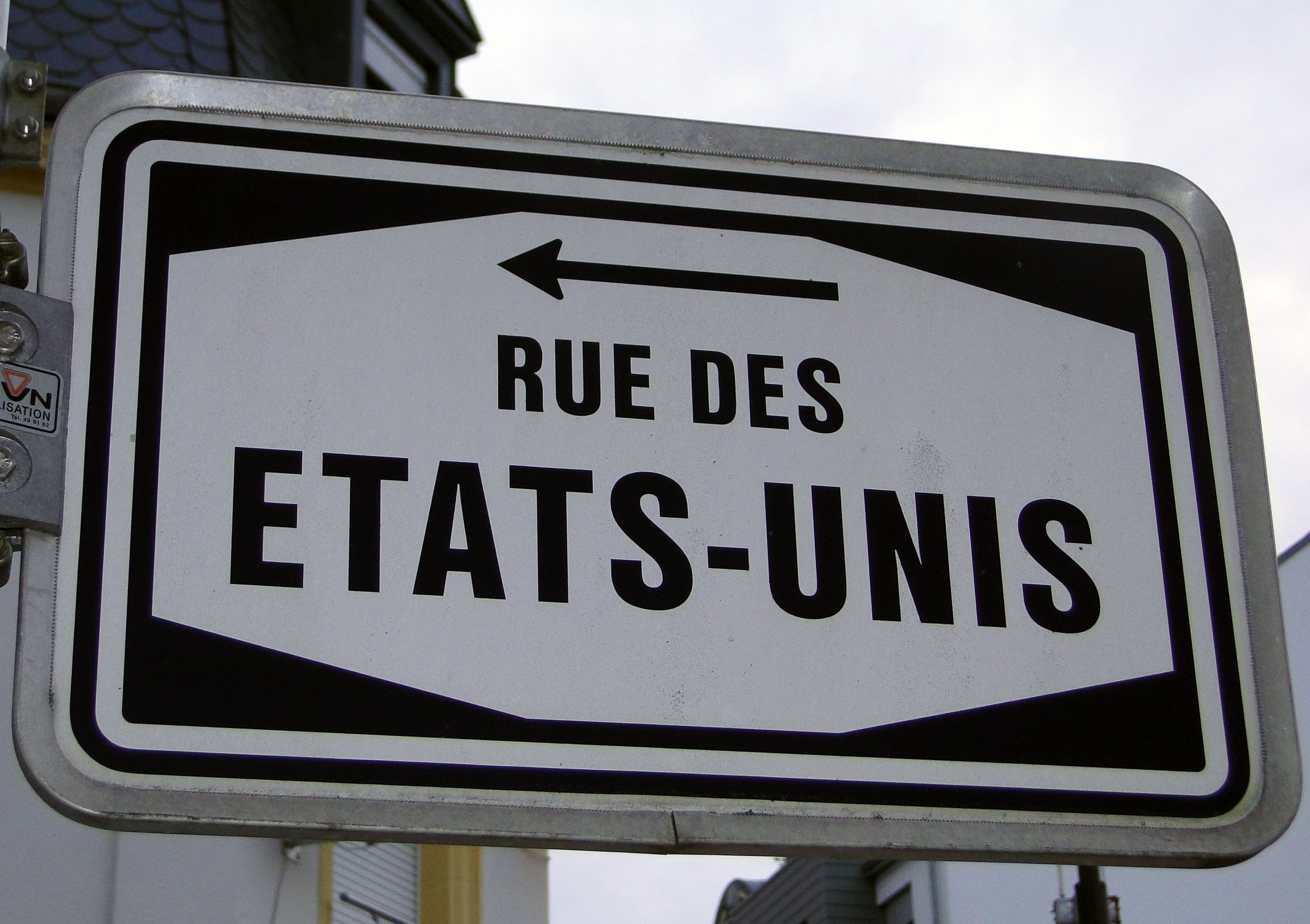
Street sign in Luxembourg showing Rue des États-Unis (United States Road)

People from the United States of America are known as and refer to themselves as Americans, a term deriving from the United States of America, the country's official name. In English, it came to refer to inhabitants of British America, and then the United States. There is some linguistic ambiguity over this use because the word can also refer to people from the Americas in general. Some languages, including French, Japanese, and Russian, use cognates of American to refer to people from the United States. Others, particularly Spanish and Portuguese, primarily use terms derived from United States or North America. There are various other local and colloquial names for Americans. The name America is the feminine form of Americus, the Latin first name of the Italian navigator Amerigo Vespucci.

== Development of the term American ==
Amerigo Vespucci first demonstrated that Brazil and the West Indies did not represent Asia's eastern outskirts as conjectured by Christopher Columbus, but instead constituted an entirely separate landmass hitherto unknown to the peoples of the Old World. Martin Waldseemüller coined the term America (in honor of Vespucci) in a 1507 world map.

First uses of the adjective American referred to the indigenous peoples of the Americas and subsequently to European settlers of the Americas and their descendants. English use of the term American for people of European descent dates to the 17th century, with the earliest recorded appearance being in Thomas Gage's The English-American: A New Survey of the West Indies in 1648. In English, American came to be applied especially to people in British America and thus its use as a demonym for the United States derives by extension.

The United States Declaration of Independence of 1776 refers to "the thirteen united [sic] States of America", making the first formal use of the country name, which was officially adopted in 1777 by the nation's first governing constitution, the Articles of Confederation. The Federalist Papers of 1787–1788, written by Alexander Hamilton, John Jay, and James Madison to advocate the ratification of the United States Constitution, use the word American in both its original Pan-American sense, but also in its United States sense: Federalist Paper 24 refers to the "American possessions" of Britain and Spain (i.e. land outside of the United States) while Federalist Papers 51 and 70 refer to the United States as "the American republic". People from the United States increasingly referred to themselves as Americans through the end of the 18th century and the 1795 Treaty of Peace and Amity with the Barbary States refers to "American Citizens" while George Washington spoke to his people of "[t]he name of American, which belongs to you in your national capacity" in his 1796 farewell address. Eventually, this usage spread through other English-speaking countries and the unqualified noun American in all forms of the English language now chiefly refers to natives or citizens of the United States, while other senses are generally specified with a qualifier such as Latin American or North American.

== International use ==
International speakers of English generally refer to people from the United States as Americans while equivalent words are used in many other languages, namely Italian (americano), Dutch (Amerikaan), Afrikaans (Amerikaner), Japanese (アメリカ人, rōmaji: amerika-jin), Filipino (Amerikano), Hebrew (אמריקני or אמריקאי), Arabic (أمريكي), Portuguese (americano), Russian (американец, американка) and Hindi (अमरीकी transliteration: Amreeki).

In French, Américain is used in a colloquial way. États-unien, derived from États-Unis (United States), while rarer, is increasingly used, including by some scholars.

In Italian, both americano and statunitense are used, although the former is more common.

In Dutch, the term Amerikaan is the most common term, V.S.-er, and Verenigde Stater are used. The last two are fairly uncommon, though some scholars have started to use either.

In German, the designation US-Amerikaner and its adjective form US-amerikanisch are sometimes used, though Amerikaner (adjective: amerikanisch) is more common in scientific, official, journalistic, and colloquial parlance. The style manual of the Neue Zürcher Zeitung, the leading German-language newspaper in Switzerland, dismisses the term US-amerikanisch as both "unnecessary" and "artificial" and recommends the term amerikanisch. Moreover, respective guidelines of the foreign ministries of Austria, Germany, and Switzerland all dictate Amerikaner/amerikanisch for official usage. Ami is a slang term common in colloquial speech.

In Spanish, the Diccionario panhispánico de dudas (English: Pan-Hispanic Dictionary of Doubts), published by the Royal Spanish Academy and the Association of Academies of the Spanish Language, recommends the genderless term estadounidense (literally United Statesian, sometimes spelled as estadunidense), because americano/a also refers to all the inhabitants of the continents of North and South America. Norteamericano and norteamericana are also common. In Latin American Spanish colloquial speech, Americans may be referred to as gringos, but the word usually carries a disparaging connotation; in Spain and Argentina, a more common word with a similar meaning to gringo is yanqui (from the English Yankee).

In Portuguese, the terms are americano, norte-americano and estado-unidense. In European Portuguese, the term americano is the most used in colloquial speech, but the press usually uses norte-americano. The everyday use of the term estado-unidense and its variant estadunidense is more common in Brazil, but its overall use is defended as the preferred by some academics.

In Chinese, there are distinct words for American in the continental sense and American in the national sense. The United States of America is called 美国 (Pinyin: měiguó; Jyutping: mei5 gwok3) while the continents of the Americas are called 美洲 (Pinyin: měizhōu; Jyutping: mei5 zau1). There are separate demonyms derived from each word and a United States citizen is referred to as 美国人 (Pinyin: měiguó rén; Jyutping: mei5 gwok3 yan4).

In the constructed language Esperanto, usonano, similar to Usonian, is the standard term for an American. The United States itself is called Usono, similar to Usonia. Only in formal contexts is the United States referred to by the long-form official name Unuiĝintaj Ŝtatoj de Ameriko or Unuiĝintaj Ŝtatoj de Nord-Ameriko (United States of North America). L. L. Zamenhof, the inventor of Esperanto, used the Usono terms as early as 1910.

== Alternative terms ==
The only officially and commonly used alternative for referring to the people of the United States in English is to refer to them as citizens of that country. Another alternative is U.S. American. Statesider is also used, chiefly in Britain.

Several other single-word English alternatives for American have been suggested over time, especially Usonian, popularized by architect Frank Lloyd Wright, and the term United Statesian.

Writer H. L. Mencken collected a number of proposals from between 1789 and 1939, finding terms including Columbian, Columbard, Fredonian, Unisian, United Statesian, Colonican, Appalacian, Usian, Washingtonian, Usonian, Uessian, U-S-ian, Uesican, and United Stater. Names for broader categories include terms such as Pan-American, Western Hemispherian, New Worlder, and North Atlantican.

Nevertheless, no alternative to "American" is common in English.

== Yankee ==
Yankee (or Yank) is a colloquial term for Americans in English; cognates can be found in other languages. Within the United States, Yankee usually refers to people specifically from New England or the Northern United States, though it has been applied to Americans in general since the 18th century, especially by the British. The earliest recorded use in this context is in a 1784 letter by Horatio Nelson.

The cockney rhyming slang and Australian derogatory slang term septic (and in the Australian case, seppo) derive from rhyming "yank" with "septic tank".

== See also ==
- List of demonyms for US states and territories
