= Jose F. Buscaglia =

American university teacher

José Francisco Buscaglia
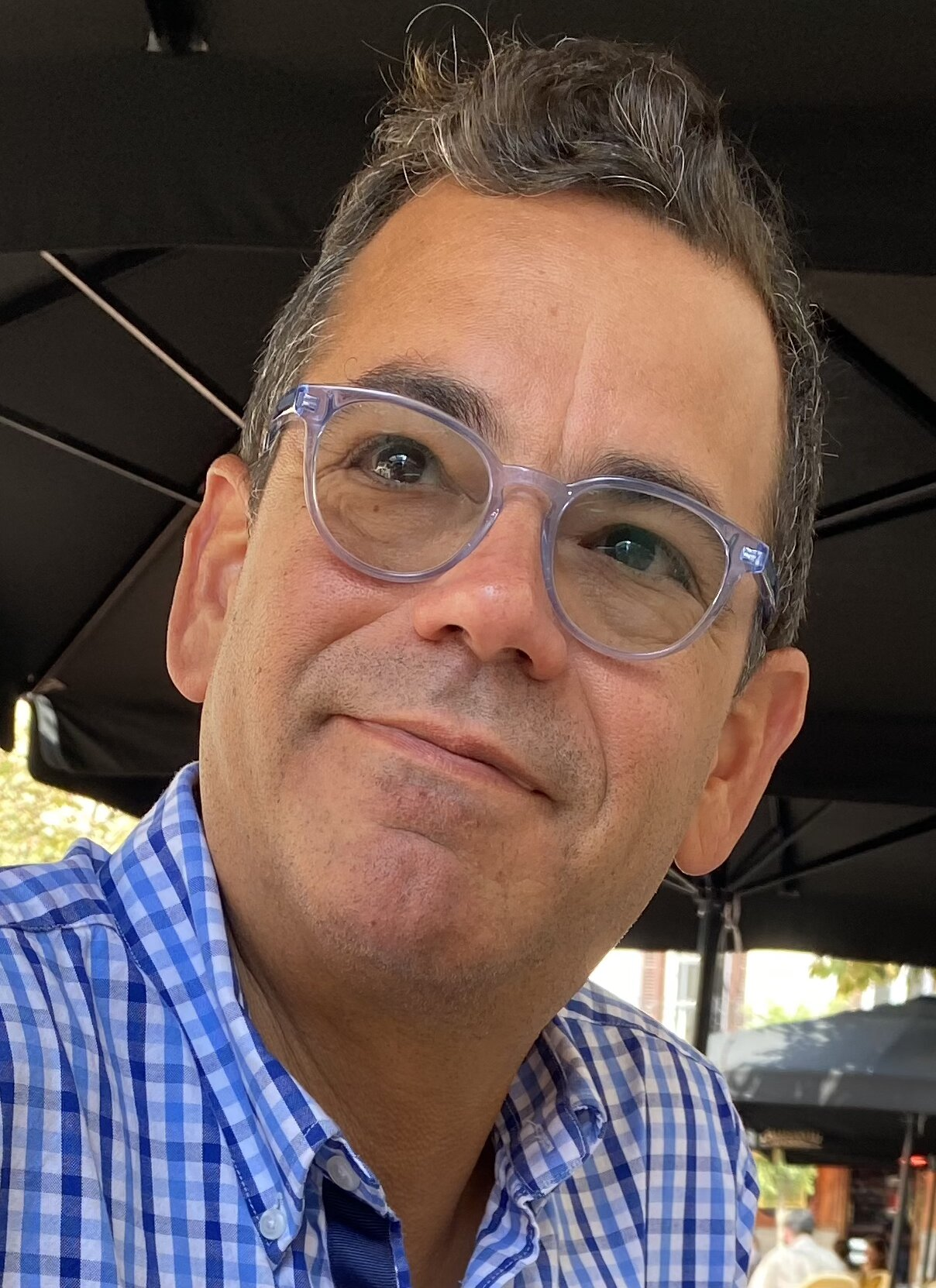
- Born: 1964 (age 61–62); San Juan, Puerto Rico
- Citizenship: Puerto Rico; United States of America
- Occupations: Philosopher, historian, social scientist, academic, author, and journalist
- Awards: Nicolas Gullen Award, Caribbean Philosophical Association

Academic background
- Education: B.A., History and Latin American Studies; M.Arch., Theory and Design; M.A., and Ph.D., Comparative Literature
- Alma mater: Princeton University; University at Buffalo
- Thesis: Impossible nations: Body and ideal in the Mulatto world of the Caribbean (1998)
- Website: https://www.jfbuscaglia.com/

José Francisco Buscaglia is a Puerto Rican philosopher, historian, social scientist, academic, author, and journalist. His last official position before retiring in 2023 was that of professor in the Department of Cultures, Societies and Global Studies at Northeastern University.

Buscaglia's research interests are directed towards aspects of history and contemporary society, focusing on the construction of racial difference, collective memory, Creole ideology, colonialism, US imperialism, dictatorship, and citizenship rights. His work follows a cross-cultural studies approach to the history of the peoples of the Greater Caribbean under Spanish and US hegemony. He is the author of Undoing Empire, Race, and Nation in the Mulatto Caribbean. He has also edited and translated the works of 17th-century Spanish intellectual and Mexico City native, Carlos de Sigüenza y Góngora.

In 2024 he published a historical novel about the intervention of the United States in the war of independence of Cuba and Puerto Rico. La maldición de Santa Águeda (The Curse of Saint Agatha) gives readers access to the evils of despotism and slavery in the Spanish Antilles, making an in-depth assessment of the vices of the subjugated, and questioning the underpinnings of US imperialism.

== Education ==
Buscaglia completed his B.A. in history at Princeton University in 1986. He obtained a Master's of architecture in 1995 and a Master's in comparative literature in 1997 from the University at Buffalo where he also received his Ph.D. degree in comparative literature, with a focus on critical theory, in 1998.

== Career ==
Buscaglia began his professional career working as a journalist and free-lance writer in Puerto Rico, from 1986 to 1991. He started his academic career as an instructor in the Department of American Studies at the University at Buffalo in 1993. Over the course of the next 22 years, he held multiple appointments at the university, becoming an assistant professor in the Department of Romance Languages and Literatures in 2001, and becoming associate professor in the Department of American Studies in 2008. In 2013 Buscaglia was granted the title of Full Professor in the Department of Transnational Studies.

In 2015, Buscaglia started teaching at Northeastern University, where he was appointed professor and chair of the Department of Languages, Literatures and Cultures while serving as an affiliate professor at the Department of African American Studies. In 2016 Buscaglia led the effort to create the Department of Cultures, Societies and Global Studies at Northeastern University, becoming the head of the unit during its first four years.

At the University at Buffalo, Buscaglia was the director of Cuban and Caribbean Programs from 1997 to 2015. At Northeastern, starting in 2016, Buscaglia was for three years the director of the Center for International Affairs and World Cultures

== Research ==
Buscaglia has authored numerous peer-reviewed articles and books. His research interests in the fields of Caribbean, Latin American and Iberian Studies lie in the areas of cross-cultural studies, the history of social institutions and ideas, racial discourse, empires, dictatorships, and colonialism.

=== Mulataje ===
One of the main scholarly contributions of Buscaglia is his work on the origins and development of the ideology of racialism and the power imbalance it has fostered since the 16th century. In his book Undoing Empire, Race, and Nation in the Mulatto Caribbean, he argues that race, as a construct, was systematically developed for the purpose of managing labor resources upon the basis of ethnicity and skin pigmentation. According to him, the system drew its inspiration from Judeo-Christian notions of tribal exclusivity growing into a global network of colonial exploitation that is still widely operative while currently disguised under the orthodoxies of identity politics and nationalist populisms.

Buscaglia's research on the Caribbean, as one of the major epicenters of the Modern experience, identifies a counterhegemonic discourse to racialist ideology. In 2003 he coined the neologism of mulataje to describe a culture and way of thinking that, since the 16th Century, has continuously attempted to undo the myth of race and its mechanisms of labor control and social policing. According to Paget Henry, in Undoing Empire Buscaglia has "made a very distinct contribution to the relation between early Euro-American thought and Caribbean thought. The dimension of the former is often overlooked.".

=== Creole Ideology ===
Another major focus in Buscaglia's work is the nature of early Latin American Creole thought and ideology. He has edited, translated, and written critical essays on the historical narratives of 17th-century Spanish intellectual and Mexico City native Carlos de Sigüenza y Góngora. This scholarship, which is based on field research that included an underwater archaeological expedition on the Yucatán coast, focuses primarily on the Infortunios de Alonso Ramírez (The Misfortunes of Alonso Ramirez), a pamphlet published in Mexico in 1690, which tells the story of the first American to circumnavigate the globe. Buscaglia finds in Ramirez's testimony and in Sigüenza's complicity as interlocutor and validator, the first enunciation of a rebellious, piratical, and freedom-loving American spirit.

=== Usonian imperialism ===
Since his earliest works, Buscaglia has questioned the use of the term American to refer in exclusivity to the people of the United States. Being that all the inhabitants of the continent stretching from Tierra del Fuego to Alaska, including the peoples of the Caribbean, have an equal claim to Americanness, he proposes the use of the term Usonian to describe the peoples, institutions, and imperial tradition of the United States of America

== Personal life ==
He is the son of José Buscaglia Guillermety.

== Awards and honors ==
- 2003 – Young Investigator Achievement Award, University at Buffalo
- 2005 – Young Investigator Award, Exceptional Scholar Program, University at Buffalo
- 2007 – Award for Outstanding Contributions to International Education, University at Buffalo
- 2013 – The Nicolás Guillén Prize for Philosophical Literature, Caribbean Philosophical Association

== Bibliography ==
=== Books ===
- Undoing Empire, Race, and Nation in the Mulatto Caribbean (2003) ISBN 978-0-8166-3574-0
- Histories of the Mexican Archipelago (2009) ISBN 978-959-260-274-8
- Infortunios de Alonso Ramírez (2011) ISBN 978-84-00-09365-5
- Infortunios de Alonso Ramírez/Misfortunes of Alonso Ramírez: Edited and translated by José F. Buscaglia-Salgado (2019) ISBN 978-0-8135-9307-4
- La maldición de Santa Águeda (2024) ISBN 978-84-1136-137-8

=== Selected articles ===
- Buscaglia Salgado, J. F. (2011). El Caribe al final de la Era Usoniana: Hacia un nuevo modelo de confederación. Aguaita, Colombia, 23 (December 2011): 38–58.
- Buscaglia Salgado, J. (2014). El poder, la ideología y el terror en el Mar de las Antillas. Historia de las Antillas, vol. 5. José Antonio Piqueras and Consuelo Naranjo Orovio, eds. Madrid: Doce Calles: 475–517. ISBN 978-84-9744-166-7
- Buscaglia, J. F. (2015). Race and the Constitutive Inequality of the Modern/Colonial Condition. Critical Terms in Caribbean and Latin American Thought: Historical and Institutional Trajectories. New York: Palgrave Macmillan: 109–124. ISBN 978-1-137-55429-1
- Naranjo Orovio, C., & Buscaglia, J. F. (2015). Race as a weapon: defending the colonial plantation order in the name of civilization, 1791–1850. Culture & History Digital Journal, 4.2.
