= American republic =

American republic or republic of America may refer to:

== Political geography ==
- The United States of America
  - America's status as a democratic republic
- Other sovereign states in the Americas which are governed as republics
  - Former sovereign states in North America which were governed as republics
  - Former sovereign states in South America which were governed as republics

== Business and industry ==
- Wellabe, formerly known as American Republic Insurance Company, headquartered at the American Republic Insurance Company Headquarters Building
- American Republics Corporation

== Other ==
- The American Republic, a 1865 book by Orestes Brownson
- The American Republic, a country in the 2024 film Megalopolis

== See also ==
- America (disambiguation)
- American (disambiguation)
- US (disambiguation)
- USA (disambiguation)
- The United States of America (disambiguation)
