= United State =

United State may refer to:

- Misnomer for United States, a sovereign state of North America
  - U.S. states, fifty of which make up (the majority of) the United States of America
- Union of Russia and Belarus, sometimes called the United State (Союзное государство Soyuznoye gosudarstvo)
- Former states of India, formed after the political integration of India:
  - United States of Matsya
  - United State of Rajasthan
  - United State of Saurashtra or United State of Kathiawar
  - United State of Travancore-Cochin
- Unitary state
- United State of Electronica, the Seattle dance/rock band
- U.S.A. (United State of Atlanta), the album by rap duo Ying Yang Twins
- "United State", the third track on the album Voices by Hall & Oates
- "United State", the 2011 album by rock band Brand New Sin

== See also ==
- Unity State, a state of South Sudan
- United States (disambiguation)
