= United States of China =

Political concept devised in the 1920s

United States of China (simplified Chinese: 中华合众国; traditional Chinese: 中華合眾國; pinyin: Zhōnghuá Hézhòngguó) is a political concept first devised in the early 1920s by Chen Jiongming of a federalized China modeled closely after the United States of America. Given the political, social and linguistic realities of China in the warlord period, Chen Jiongming believed that a federalist approach was the only feasible way to eventually establish a united, democratic republic. Beginning with Guangdong as a model state, he wanted to organize a "United States of China in the manner of the American experience" through negotiation with federalists from all parts of the country. The introduction of Special Economic Zones since the 1980s have led to the development of several distinct regional economies within the People's Republic of China, such as the Pearl River Delta, Yangtze River Delta, and the Bohai Circle. Several of these regions have economies the size of small developed nations. Some scholars who use the term United States of China argue that during the process of reform and opening up the People's Republic has evolved into a de facto federal state in which these economic regions have wide discretion to implement policy goals which are set by the PRC central government and in which provinces and localities actively compete with each other in order to advance economically.

== See also ==
- Federal Republic of China
- New Federal State of China
