= List of ships named United States =

A number of ships have been named United States, after the United States.

== Merchant ships ==
- PS United States (1847), an American trans-Atlantic sidewheel, built by William H Webb in New York
- SS United States (1860), a British passenger cargo of Anchor Line, Glasgow, wrecked in 1861
- SS United States (1864), an American cargo steamship lost in 1881
- SS United States (1903), a Danish passenger-cargo liner of the Scandinavian American Line, scrapped in 1935
- SS United States (1909), an American passenger ferry of the Indiana Transportation Company
- SS United States (1951), an American retired ocean liner of United States Line, and Blue Ribband holder

== Naval ships ==
- USS United States (1797) was one of the original six frigates that served from 1798 until 1865.
- USS United States (CC-6) was a Lexington-class battlecruiser canceled and scrapped when the vessel was only 12 percent complete.
- USS United States (CVA-58) was an aircraft carrier canceled five days after her keel was laid down in 1949. The ship would have been the lead ship under the United States-class aircraft carrier.
- USS United States was to have been the eighth Nimitz-class aircraft carrier, but renamed USS Harry S. Truman in 1995.
