= United Kingdom (disambiguation) =

The United Kingdom (full name: United Kingdom of Great Britain and Northern Ireland) is a country located off the north-western coast of continental Europe.

United Kingdom may also refer to:

== Arts and entertainment ==
- A United Kingdom, a 2016 biographical film
- United Kingdom (album), a 1989 album by American Music Club
- United Kingdoms (album), a 1993 album by Ultramarine

== Political entities ==
- Federal monarchy, a type of federation
- United Kingdom of Great Britain and Ireland, the United Kingdom between 1801 and 1922
- United Kingdom of the Netherlands, an unofficial name for the Kingdom of the Netherlands from 1815 until 1839
- United Kingdom of Libya, a state between 1951 and 1969
- United Kingdom of Portugal, Brazil and the Algarves, the Portuguese state between 1815 and 1825
- United Kingdom of Denmark, one of several official translations of the Danish word Rigsfællesskabet
- United Kingdom of Denmark and Norway, a state between 1523 and 1814
- United Kingdoms of Sweden and Norway, a political union between 1814 and 1905
- United Monarchy of Israel and Judah, a state between 1050 BC and 930 BC
- United Kingdom of Ecuador, Peru and Bolivia, a proposed state in 1846
- United Kingdom of Poland, a state between 1320 and 1386

== See also ==
- Terminology of the British Isles
- United Kingdoms (disambiguation)
