= Scandinavian America Line =

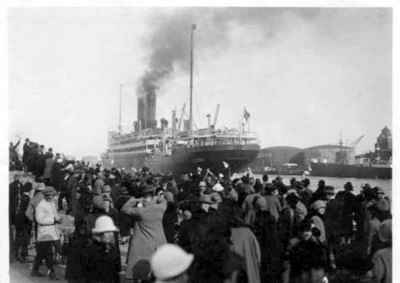
Scandinavian America Line's Frederik VIII leaving Copenhagen, October 1925.

The Scandinavian America Line (Skandinavien-Amerika-Linien) was founded in 1898, when Det Forenede Dampskibs-Selskap (DFDS) took over the steamship company Thingvalla Line. The passenger and freight service between Scandinavia and New York City was operated under the name Scandinavian America Line until 1935.

== Fleet ==
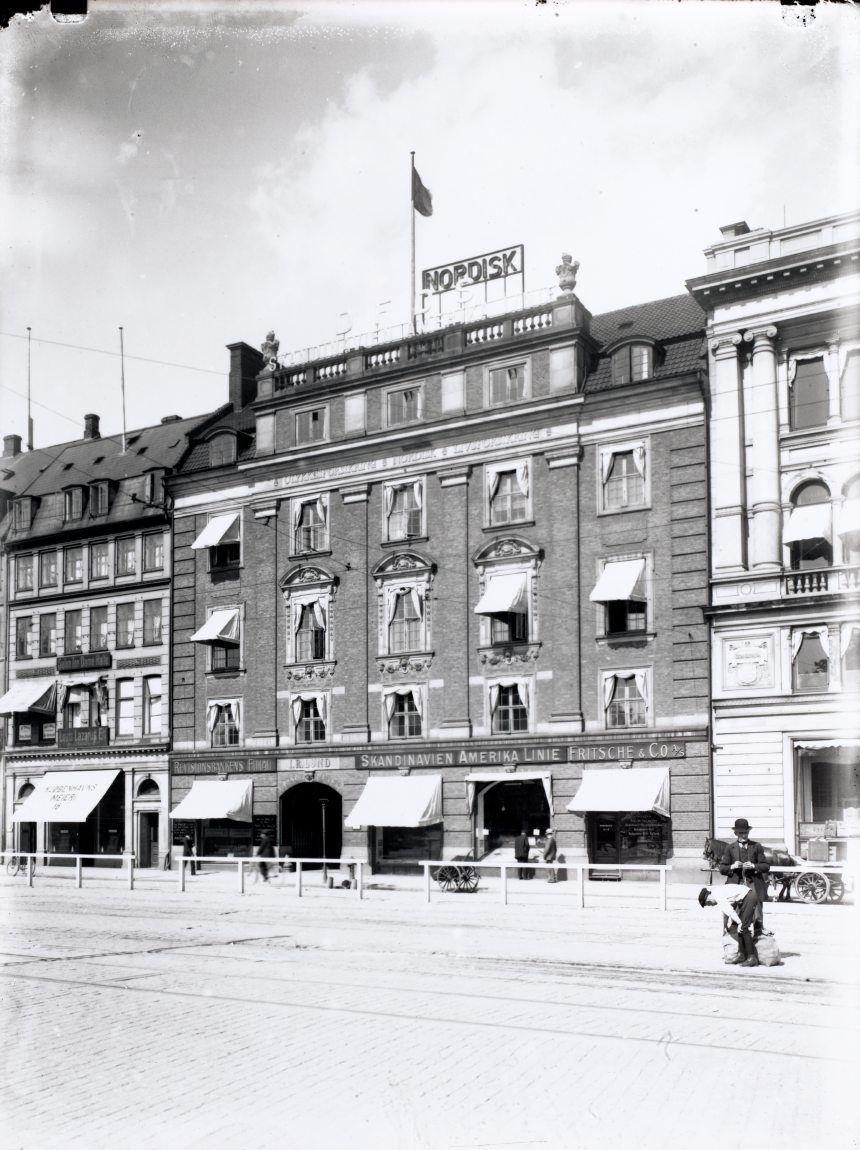
The company's headquarters at Kongens Nytorv 14 in Copenhagen.

One of the ships in the Scandinavian American Line was the United States. She was built in Glasgow in 1903 by Alexander Stephen and Sons. She was 10,082 GRT, and 500.8 feet (152.6 m) long. Her Master was Captain Wulff. The United States made her maiden voyage on March 30, 1903; she sailed from Copenhagen to Christiana (present-day Oslo), Christiansand then on to New York by June 3, 1903. United States left from Copenhagen on her last voyage on October 25, 1934. She was damaged by a fire on September 2, 1935 at Copenhagen and was scrapped that same year in Leghorn.

In November 1935 the ship Frederik VIII sailed the Scandinavian America Line's final voyage from New York to Copenhagen. She was scrapped in 1936. After that time, cargo and passenger service continued under DFDS's own name.

=== List of ships ===
- Hekla, 1884-1898, taken over with Thingvalla Line, 1905 sold to Danish owners, renamed Eduard Regel. 3,258 GRT
- Thingvalla, 1874–1898, taken over with Thingvalla Line, 1900 sold to Norway. 2,524 GRT
- Norge, 1881–1898, taken over with Thingvalla Line, 1904 wrecked near Rockall, 620 lives lost. 3,310 GRT
- Island, 1882–1898, taken over with Thingvalla Line, 1906 scrapped. 2,844 GRT
- Oscar II, 1901–1933 scrapped. 9,956 GRT
- Hellig Olav, 1903–1934 scrapped. 10,085 GRT
- United States, 1903–1935 damaged by fire at Copenhagen and scrapped. 10,095 GRT
- C.F. Tietgen, 1897, formerly Rotterdam, 1906 bought from Holland America Line and renamed C.F. Tietgen, 1913 sold to Russian American Line, renamed Dwinsk. 8,173 GRT
- Frederik VIII, 1914–1936, scrapped. 11,850 GRT

== Legacy ==
Amerikakaj (America Quay) is the name of the quay in the former Free Port of Copenhagen from where the America liners departed. Scandinavian America Line's sales office in Copenhagen was based at Nyhavn 1.

== See also ==
- Captain Johan Wilhelm Hempel
- Hamburg America Line
- Holland America Line
- Norwegian America Line
- Swedish American Line
