= Amaliegade 47 =

Listed building in Copenhagen

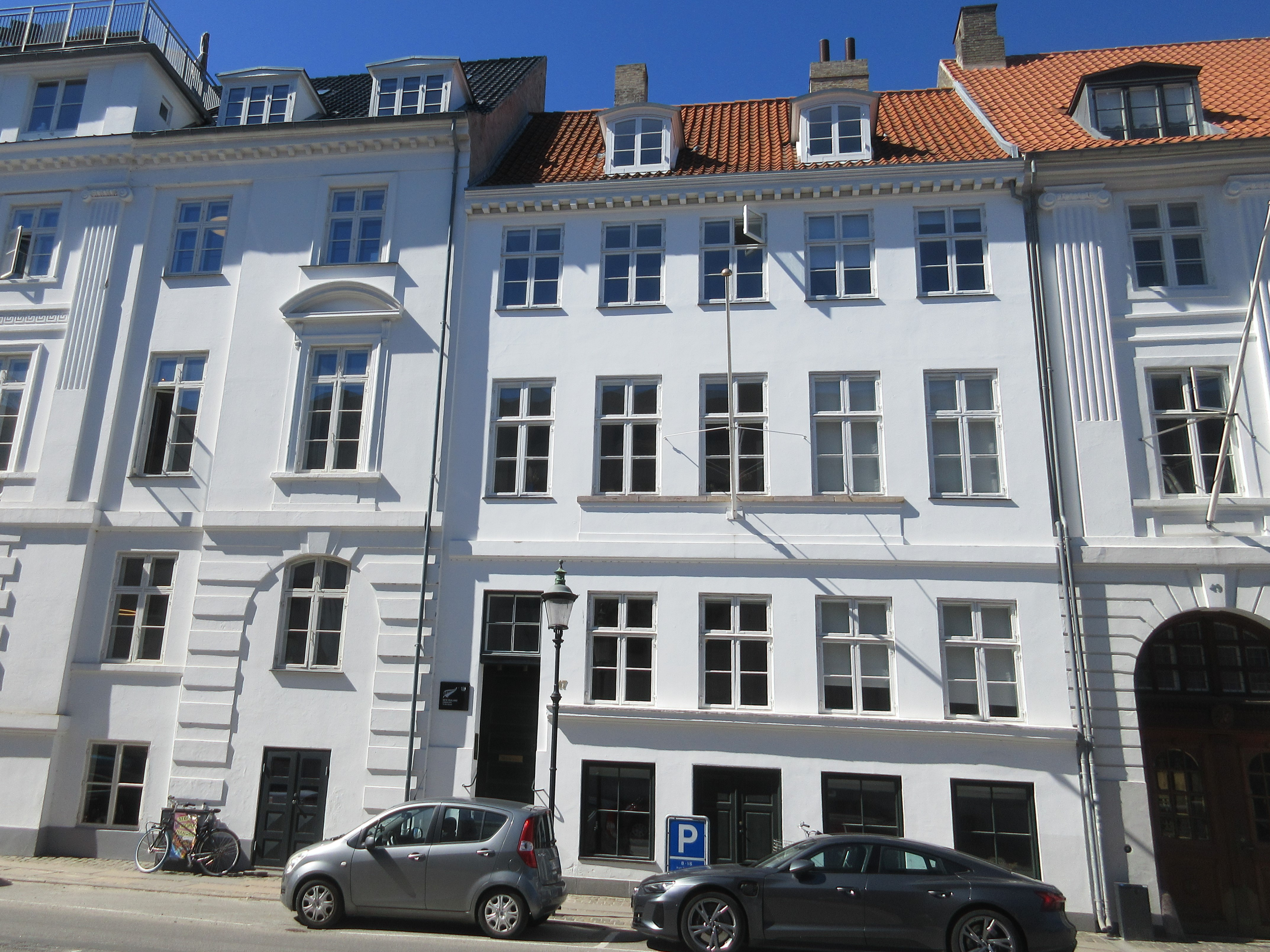
- Interactive map of the Amaliegade 47 area

General information
- Architectural style: Neoclassical
- Location: Copenhagen, Denmark 52.39
- Coordinates: 55°41′15.72″N 12°35′45.82″E
- Completed: 18th century

Design and construction
- Architect: Andreas Hallander

Amaliegade 47 (1859–1926: Amaliegade 41) is a Neoclassical property situated at the north end of Amaliegade, around the corner from Esplanaden, in the Frederiksstaden district of Copenhagen, Denmark. Notable former residents include the diplomat Peder Blicher Olsen and the military officer Philipp Wörishöffer. Julius F. Schierbeck's Eftf., a ship-chandler's business, was later, from 1859 until at least the 1950s, based in the building. It was listed in the Danish registry of protected buildings and places in 1945.

== History ==
=== Construction and site history ===
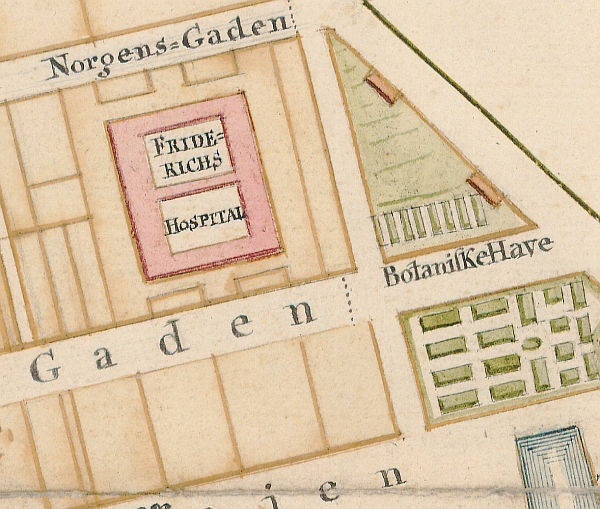
Oeder's Botanical Garden in Amaliegade

Copenhagen's second botanical garden was situated at the site from 1752. It was created by Georg Christian Oeder in the newly founded Frederiksstaden district at the request of Frederik V at a site bisected by Amaliegade just north of Frederik's Hospital. The smaller western section, covering just under half a hectare, was equipped with a greenhouse while the eastern section remained largely unplanted. The garden was opened to the public in 1763.

After eight years the area was reacquired by the king and the botanical garden was then moved to Gammelholm. In 1781, the site in Amaliegade was instead donated to royal building inspector Caspar Frederik Harsdorff on condition that he would "build it over with good and permanent buildings within a period of eight years". His plan for the site was a terrace with eight individual houses. He embarked on the construction later the same year, but ran into economic difficulties and eventually had to give up the project altogether. Andreas Hallander and Johan Martin Quist, two of his former students, saved him from bankruptcy by acquiring the Amaliegade lots. Hallander acquired the northernmost part of the area. He commenced with the building at the corner of Toldbodvej and then worked his way south. Amaliegade 47 (then 69 JL) was constructed in 1790. On 1 December 1790, Hallander insured the building for 6,000 Danish rigsdaler.

=== Changing owners, 1790–1859 ===
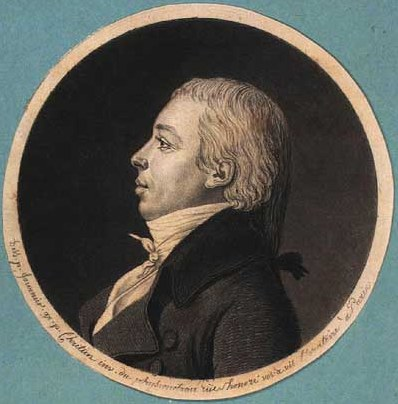
Peder Blicher Olsen

On 13 December, Hallander sold it to Peder Blicher Olsen, secretary in the Department of Foreign Affairs. In 1793, he left Copenhagen when he was appointed as Danish consul to Morocco. In 1800, he was appointed as Danish resident minister and consul-general to the United States.

In the new cadastre of 1806, the property was listed as No. 135. It was by then owned by Henning Rasmussen.

At the time of the 1834 census, No. 135 was home to four households. Jørgen Møller, a ship broker, resided on the ground floor with his wife Johanne Dorothea (née Larsen), their two children (aged eight and 10) and two maids. Maria Elisabeth Dorrien and Louise Henriette Dorrien, daughters of General Liebert Hieronymus von Dörrien (1772-1814), resided on the first floor with the lady's companion Hedevig Troyel, the lodger Elisabeth Ancher and one maid. Christian Frederik Wilkens, a captain in the Royal Danish Navy, resided in the second floor apartment with one maid. Ane Margrethe Olsen, the proprietor of a tavern in the basement, resided in the associated dwelling with the maid Susanne Hendriksen and the maid's husband Peter Hendriksen (a first mate, styrmand).

At the time of the 1840 census, No. 135 was home to mostly new residents. Georg Philip Kinzi, a royal cook, resided on the ground floor with his wife Justine Amalie Kinzi (née Hansen) and two sons (aged three and six). The first floor apartment was still occupied by the two Dorrien sisters. Philipp Wörishöffer (1804-1892), a military officer teaching German at the Army Cadet Academy, resided on the second floor with his wife Margrethe Charlotte Christiane Wørnshøffer, their three children (aged one to four) and two maids. Susanne Henriksen, a widow, resided in the basement with her seven-year-old daughter, a lodger (a first mate, styrmand) and a maid.

At the time of the 1845 census, No. 135 was home to just three households. One of the apartments was occupied by the medical doctor Carl Hohner, second lieutenant Waldemar Holck, Carl Holck and captain lieutenant Christian Nicolai Wulff. Bent Leth, a ship's captain, resided in another apartment with his wife Marie Leth, their six children (aged one to 14) and two maids. Susanne Henriksen, a widow aged just 37, resided in the third apartment with her 12-year-old daughter and one maid.

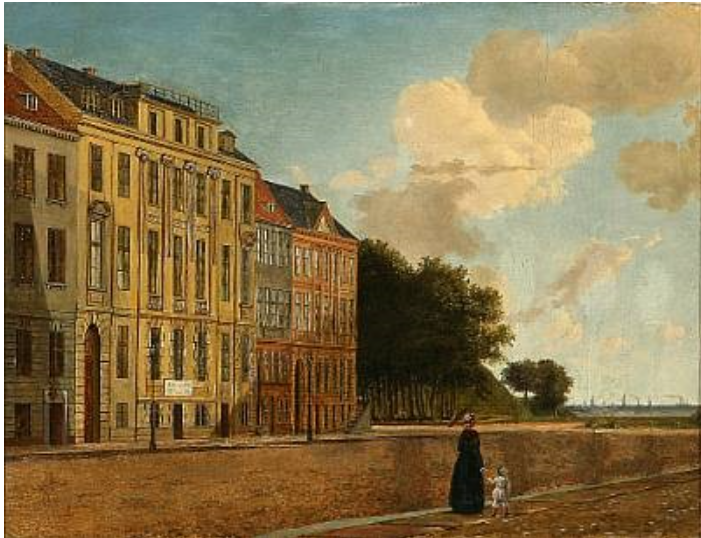
Amaliegade 47 in the mid-19th century

At the time of the 1850 census, No. 135 was again home to three households. P.A. Meyer, a clerk, resided on the ground floor with his wife E. Meyer, their two children (aged two and seven) and one maid. A. Petersen, a restaurateur, resided on the first floor with his wife M.E. Jensen, their two-year-old child A.G.W. Petersen, a maid and two male servants. M. B. Jespersen, a quarantine officer, resided on the second floor with his wife Johanne Marie Petersen, their 10-year-old son, 44-year-old Elise Christina Petersen, 42-year-old Kirstine Margrethe Petersen and one maid.

=== Julius F. Schierbeck's Eftf. ===
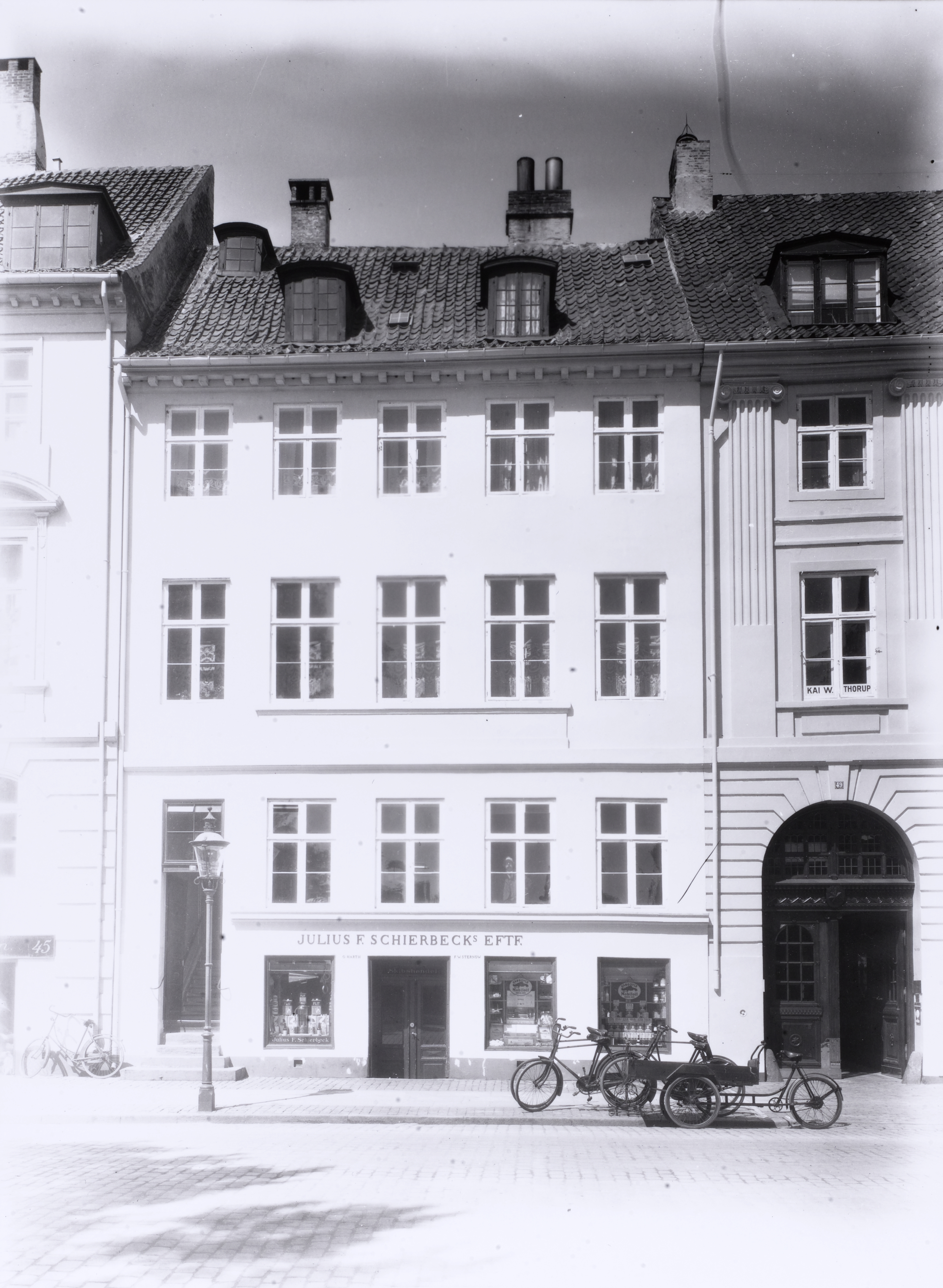
The building, photographed by Peter Elfelt in 1935

When house numbering by street was introduced in Copenhagen in 1859, No. 135 was initially listed as Amaliegade 41 (from 1926 changed to Amaliegade 47).

The property was acquired the same year for 304,000 DKK by Julius F. Schierbeck. In partnership with his brother, Schierbeck had until then been the owner of a ship-chandler started by their father in Helsingør. The abolition of the Sound Dues had resulted in a closure of the firm. On 11 April 1858, Julius F. Schierbeck (1809-1889) had founded a new ship-chandler's business in Copenhagen. In 1875, it was taken over by Johan August Olsen (born 1835) and Carl Philip (1833-1892) as Julius F. Schierbeck's Eftf. ("Julius F. Schierbeck's Successors"). The company was also active from 1900 as a wholesaler of tea and later also of products from the Faroe Islands. Olsen's son-in-law Frands William Stenow (born 1871) was made a partner in 1901. Olsen retired from the company in 1910, ceding his share of the company to his son Otto Edvard Harth Olsen (born 1882) who was made a partner in 1910. The company was taken over in 1944 by Aage Stenow (born 1898). It was based in the building until at least 1950.

== Architecture ==
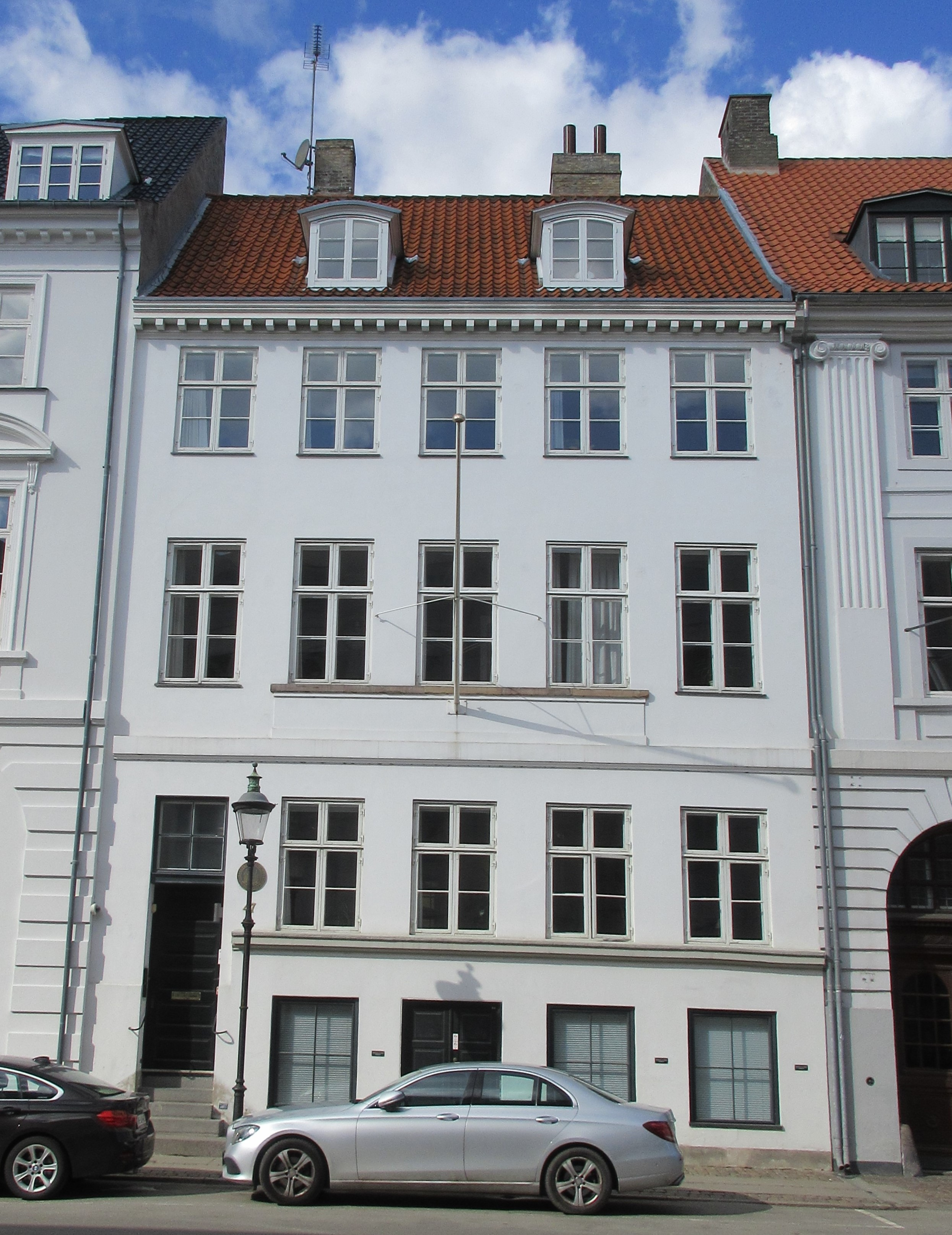
Amaliegade 47.

Amaliegade 47 is constructed with three storeys over a walk-out basement. The dressed five-bay facade is finished with a belt course above the ground floor, sandstone sill courses below the ground floor windows and the three central windows on the first floor, and a modillioned cornice. The main entrance, situated in the bay furthest to the left, is topped by a transom window. The basement entrance is located in the central bay. The red tile roof features two dormer windows towards the street. A one-and-a-half-bay side wing (one bay plus a canted bay), topped by a vaulted tile roof, projects from the rear side of the building.

== Today ==
The property is today owned by Chr. Augustinus Fabrikker. The Augustinus Foundation is based in the building.
