= Prior House =

Neoclassical building in Copenhagen

- Den Priorske Gård
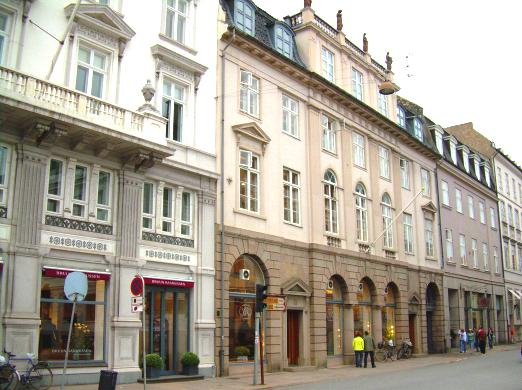
- Interactive map of the Prior House area

General information
- Architectural style: Neoclassical
- Location: Copenhagen, Denmark
- Coordinates: 55.68255563467582°N 12.588641397707795°E
- Completed: 1794

Design and construction
- Architect: Andreas Hallander

The Prior House (Danish: Den Priorske Gård), located at Bredgade 33, opposite Sankt Annæ Plads in Copenhagen, Denmark, is the former headquarters of the Bruun Rasmussen auction house. The Neoclassical building was constructed in 1794 by master mason Andreas Hallander for a ship captain. It originally contained a single high-end apartment on each of the three upper floors.

The building takes its name from businessman and ship-owner Hans Peter Prior, its owner from 1850 until his death 25 years later, whose shipping company DFDS was initially based in the building. One of Prior's sons was the sculptor Lauritz Prior. In 1864, Prior charged the architect Wilhelm Petersen with the design of a three-storey atalier building for the son. Prior's Atelier Building (Danish: Den Prior'ske Atalierbygning, Bredgade 33C) is decorated with a series of reliefs created by Lauritz Prior.

It was after his death used by a number of other leading Danish artists of the late 19th and early 20th century, including Peder Severin Krøyer, Laurits Tuxen, Carl Bloch, Frants Henningsen and Edvard Weie. Kunstnernes Frie Studieskoler, an art school founded by Krøyer and Tuxen as an alternative to that of the Royal Danish Academy of Fine Arts, was initially based in the building. The Prior House remained in the hands of the Prior family for almost one hundred years. In 1847, Bredgade 33 was acquired by Bruubn Rasmussen-founder Arne Bruun Rasmussen, whose auction house has since then been headquartered in the building. Other notable former residents include the naval officers Johann Christopher Hoppe, Jost van Dockum and Edouard van Dockum, government officials Johann Paul Høpp and Friedrich Nicolaus von Liliencron, writer Adam Oehlenschläger and politician Orla Lehmann.

== History ==
=== 18th century ===
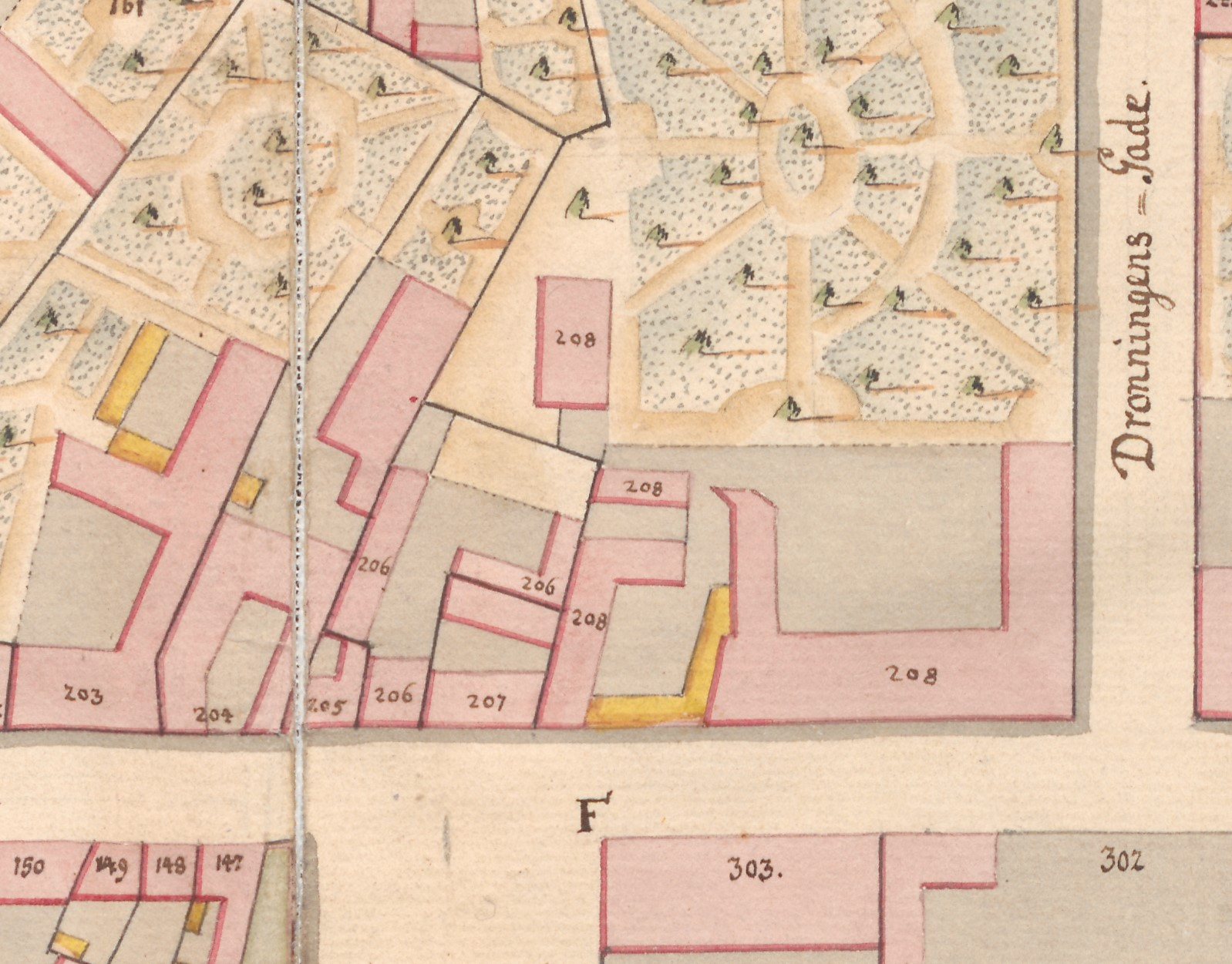
No. 208 seen in a detail from Christian Gedde's map of St. Ann's East Quarter, 1757

The site was once part of the Gyldensteen Mansion’s gardens, located at the corner of Norgesgade (now Bredgade) and Dronningens Tværgade. In the 1756 cadastre, the property was listed as No. 208 in St. Ann’s East Quarter and belonged to Jean Henri Desmercières, the illegitimate son of Count Gyldensteen. In the 1790s, much of the garden was divided into lots for redevelopment, and Bredgade 33 became known as No. 208A.

=== Hoppe and the new building ===
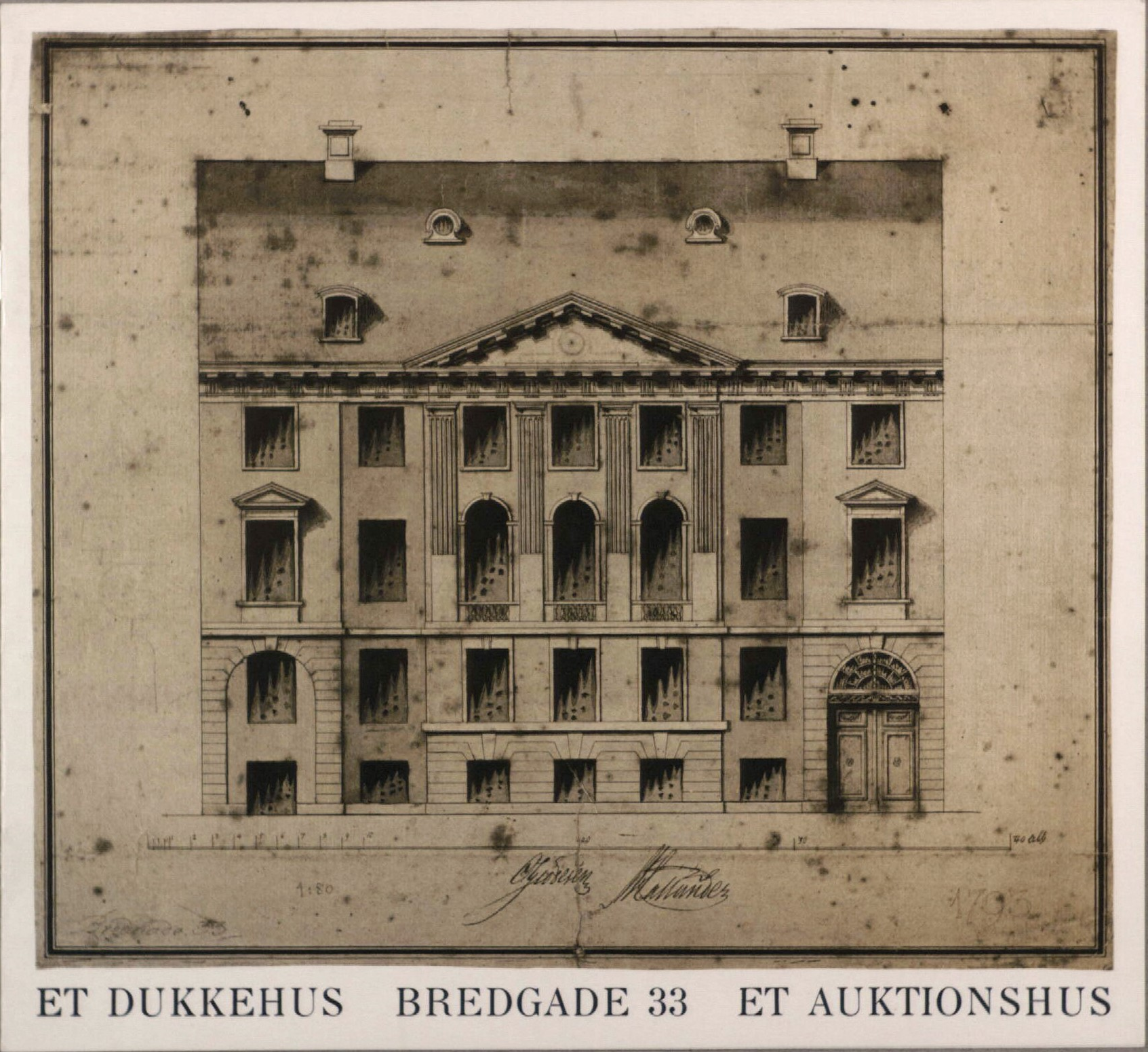
Rendering by Andreas Hallander, 1793

The present building on the site was constructed in 1794 by Andreas Hallander for ship captain Ole Gjødesen. The property was after a while sold to the naval officer Johan Christopher Hoppe. His father was secretary of Danish Chancery Peder Hoppe and his brother was landowner Frederik Hoppe.

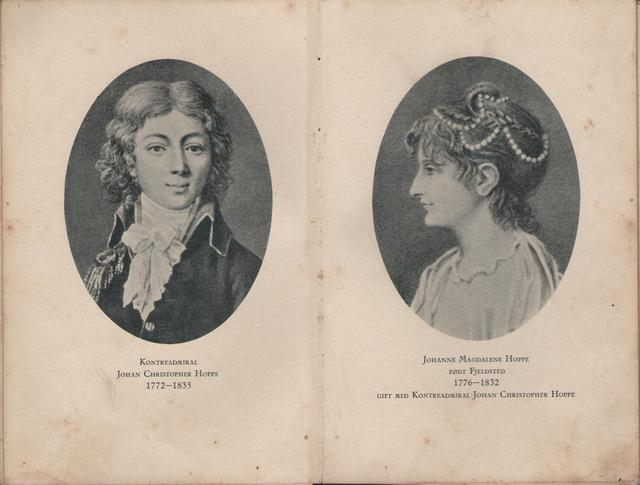
Johan Christopher Hoppe and his wife Johanne Magdalene Hoppe (néeFjeldsted)

Hoppe's property was home to 52 residents in four households at the time of the 1801 census. The owner resided in one of the apartments with his wife Johanne Magdalene Fielsted, their three sons (aged one to six), his mother-in-law Anne Birgitte Wildenrath, a coachman, a caretaker and four maids. Ernst August von Döring, a kammerjunker, resided in another apartment with his wife Henriette Lovise von Døring, their two daughters (aged two and three), kammerjunker Ludolph Henrich Elstag von Døring, husfrøken Augusta Magdalene von Schleppegrell, two male servants and three maids. Christian Walterstorff, a naval captain and relative of Hoppe's wife, resided in the third apartment with his wife Marie Sophie Schæffer, their four children (aged two to 12), one male servant and two maids. Maren Hougaard (née Jørgensdatter), a widow, resided in the basement with her three children (aged five to 13), two maids and four lodgers (sailors).

The property was listed in the new cadastre of 1806 as No. 190 in St. Ann's East Quarter. It was still owned by Hoppe at that time.

Adam Oehlenschläger and his wife Christiane Heger resided on the ground floor from their wedding in 1810 until 1821. Vice Admiral Jost van Dockum resided in one of the apartments from 1722 until 1833. Edouard van Dockum was also a resident of the building from 1828 to 1933.

=== 1840s ===
The property was home to 27 residents in five households at the 1840 census. Johann Paul Høpp, a civil servant in the Slesvig Holstensk Cancellie with title of kancelliråd, resided on the first floor with his wife Sophie Wilhelmine Høpp (née Hering), one male servant and three maids. Jacob Koefoed, a judge at Land samt Hof og Stadsrette, resided on the ground floor with his wife Henriette Louise Koefoed (née Duntzfelt), one male servant and two maids. Friedrich Nicolaus von Liliencron, a civil servant in the Slesvig Holstensk Cancellie, resided on the second floor with his wife Emilie baronesse af Liliencron (née Damreicher), their two sons (aged one and four), one male sertvant and three maids. Jørgen Jacobsen Brorfelte, a workman, resided in the basement with his wife Kirstine Charlotte Hanekjær and their two daughters (aged 12 and 15). Lars Kiersgaard, a barkeeper and royal runner (biløber), resided in the basement with his wife Marie Hildeband and 21-year-old Christine Marie Kiersgaard.

The property was home to just 11 residents at the 1845 census. Friederick Niclai Paul Baron Liliencron, who had now become a widower, resided in the building with his sons Conrad and Frederik (aged nine and six), tutor Christopher Hans Thønssen, one male servant and three maids. Jacob Koefoed resided in another apartment with his wife, one male servant and two maids. William W. Irwin, United States Ambassador to Denmark, resided in the third apartment with his wife Sophie Bache, their three children (aged two to seven), one male servant and four maids.

=== Prior family ===
The property was acquired by H.P. Prior in 1850. He had the same year purchased the steam ship Zephyr. It was soon followed by more ships. His ships berthed at Kvæsthusbruen. In 1866, Prior was a co-founder of DFDS. The politician Orla Lehmann resided in one of the apartments from 1862 to 1867.

Prior's son Lauritz Prior was educated and trained as a sculptor at the Royal Danish Academy of Fine Arts. In 1865–66, Prior charged the architect Wilhelm Petersen with the design of a three-storey atelier building with studio facilities for his son and other artists. Lauritz Prior's atelier was located on the ground floor. The two upper floors contained ateliers for painters. Carl Bloch, who had just returned from Rome, was one of the ateliers from the building's completion in 1866. His painting Niels Ebbesen and Count Gert was created in the building. The art historian Nicolai Bøgh has described a visit to Bloch's atelier in Bredgade.

The property was after Prior's death in 1875 passed to his sons. Lauritz Prior died in 1877. Another son, Axel Prior, had started a wholesale business dealing in building materials in 1866. This company was also headquartered in the building. A third son, Johannes Prior, was an engineer who worked with ship design.

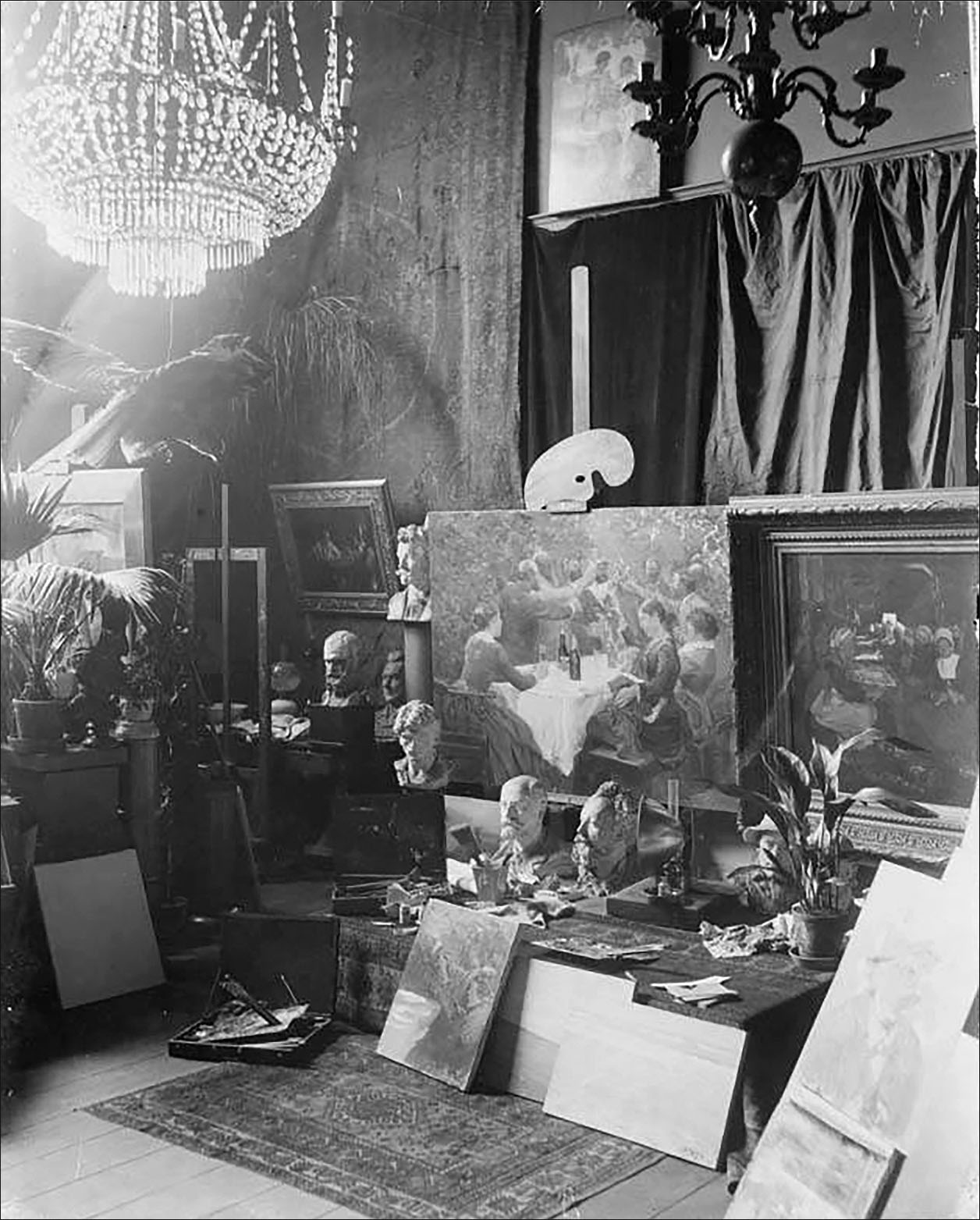
P. Sø Krøyer's atelier in 1888

The property was home to 45 residents in five households at the 1885 census. Peter Axel Prior resided on the first and floor with his wife Hannah Prior, their four children (aged one to 16) and two maids. Johannes Andreas Prior, a civil engineer, resided on the second floor with his wife Fernando Frederikke Jacobine Louise Prior, their seven children (aged seven to 18) and two maids. Søren Peter Brønnum, an office courier employed by Peter Axel Prior, resided in the garret with his wife Johanne Kathrine Brønnum, their four children (aged one to nine) and four lodgers. Carl Eduard Johnstad, a restaurateur, resided in the basement with his wife Conradine Amalie Johnstad, their 17-year-old daughter Agnes Amalie Johnstad, their 15-year-old foster son Agnes Bertholine Johnstad, six employees, two apprentices and one lodger. Hans Ferdinand Holm, a concierge, resided in the basement with his 28-year-old daughter Vilhelmine Jensine Marie Holm.

Prior's Atelier Building was after Lauritz Prior's death still used as ateliers for artists. Peder Severin Krøyer rented one of the ateliers from around 1877 to 1803. He let it out to other artists when he was abroad. Other artists to use the ateliers included Vilhelm Rosenstand (in around 1878), Frants Henningsen, Laurits Tuxen and Edvard Weie. Krøyer and Tuxen founded Kunstnernes Frie Studieskoler in the building. Later artists to use the ateliers include Anthon Dorph and Edvard Weie.

=== 20th century ===
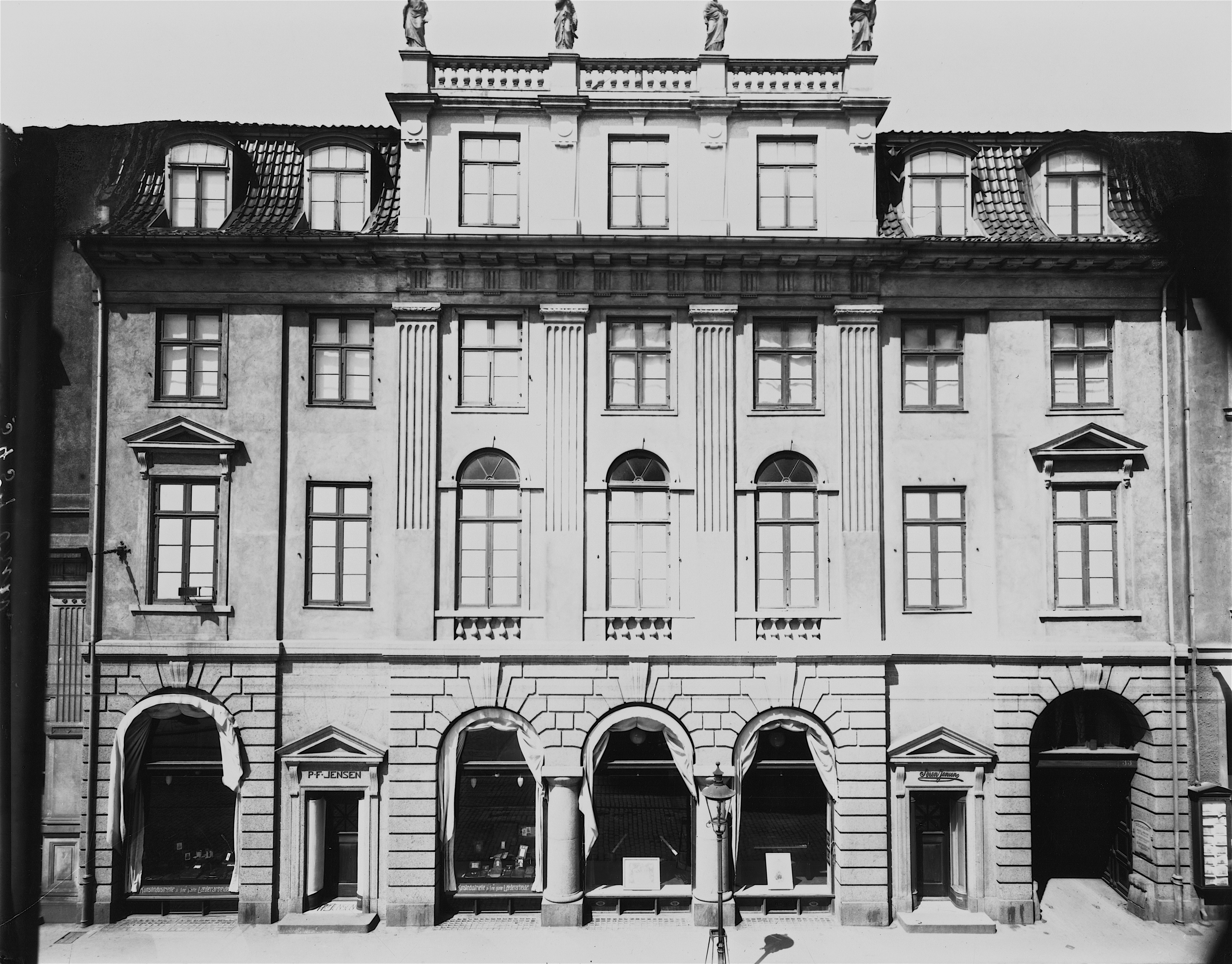
P.F. Jensens lædervarerhandel

Axel Prior died in 1896 but his former company was still based in the building in 1950. P.F. Jensens lædervarerhandel, a retailer of leather products, occupied the ground floor of the building in the 1900s. The premises were later taken over by an antique shop. The Atelier Building was for a while used as storage space by Simonsen & Nielsen.

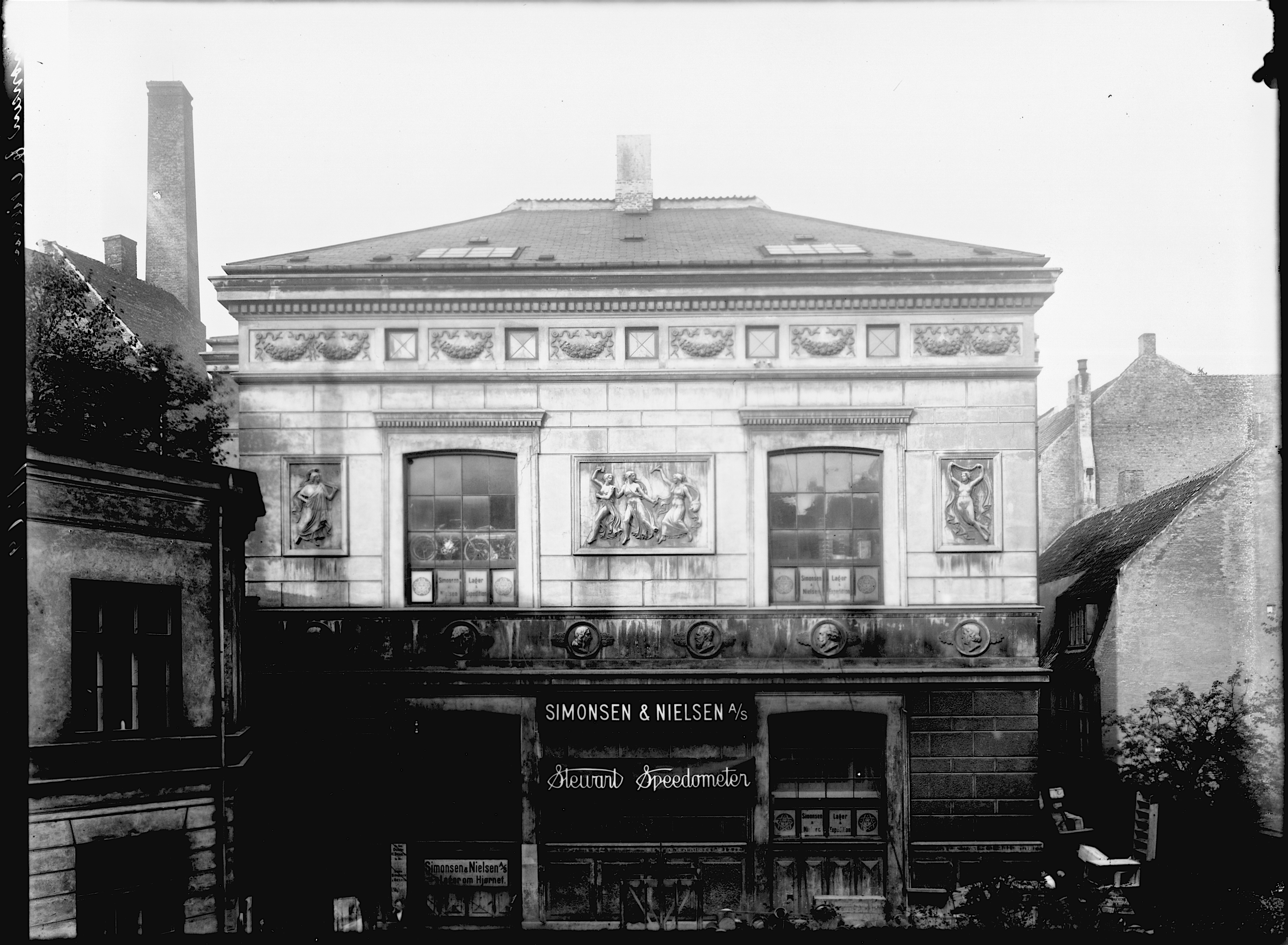
The Atelier Building with Simonsen & Nielsen's name written on the facade

In 1921, Kunstnernes Statsunderstøttede Croquisskole relocated to the Atelier Building. The art school was the result of a collaboration between Kvindelige Kunstneres Samfund (KKS), Malende Kunstneres Sammenslutning (MKS), Kunstnerforeningen af 18. November, Charlottenborgs Billedhuggere, Dansk Billedhuggersamfund, and Billedhuggerforeningen og Grafisk Kunstnersamfund. The first leader of the school was painter and weaver Astrid Holm. In September 1937, the school relocated to a ground-floor apartment at Nyhavn 18.

In 1942 the city launched a plan for the extension of Sankt Annæ Plads to Borgergade. Bredgade 27-31 and part of Bredgade 33 would therefore have to be demolished. The plans were later abandoned. In 1947 Bredgade 33 was instead sold to Arne Bruun Rasmussen. He had for some time been looking for a suitable building for his auction house. Viola Blomsterforretning, O. Im. Hansen, a flower shop, was based in the building in 1950.

== Architecture ==
=== Bredgade 33 ===
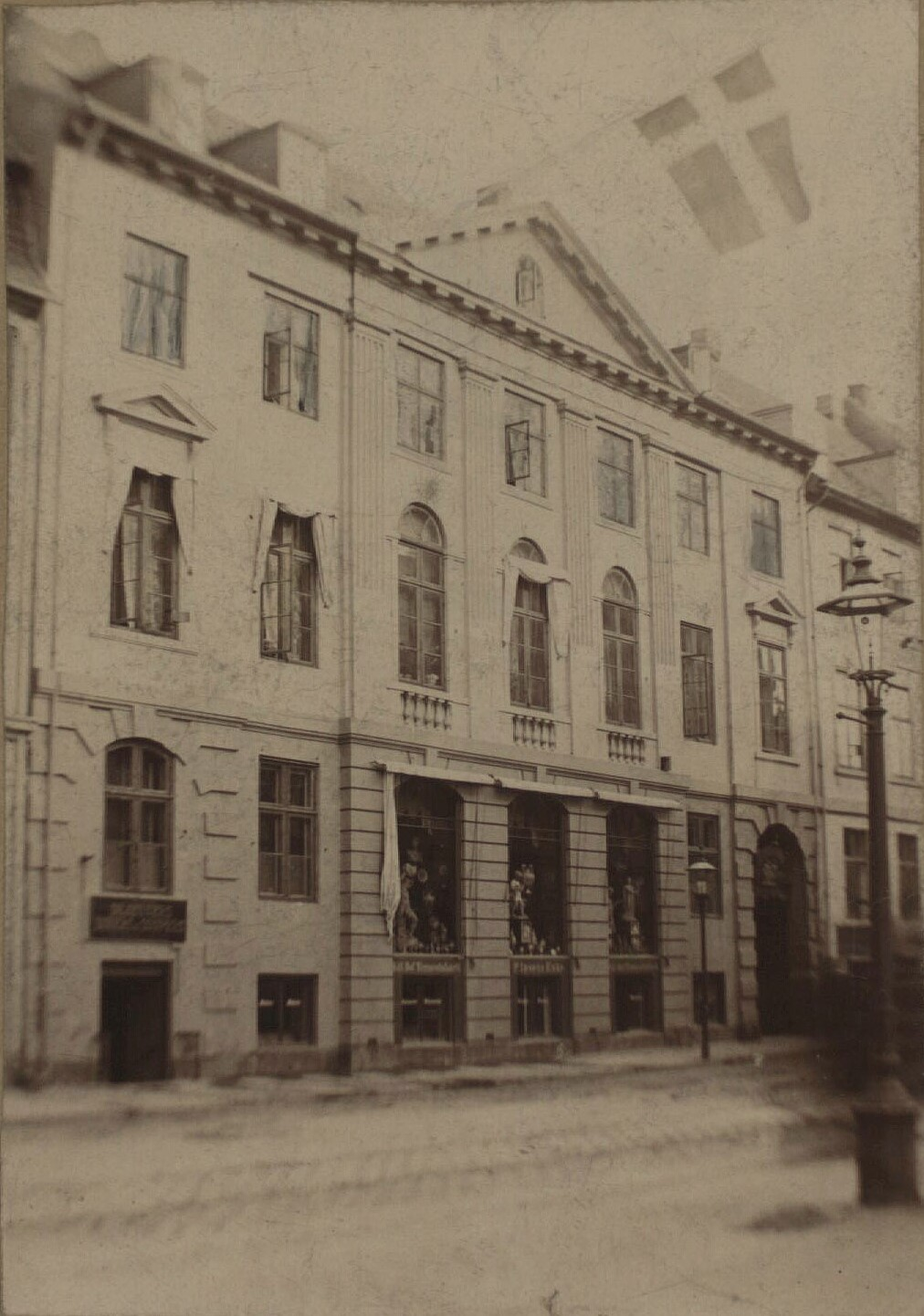
The building prior to the 1903 alterations (1893)

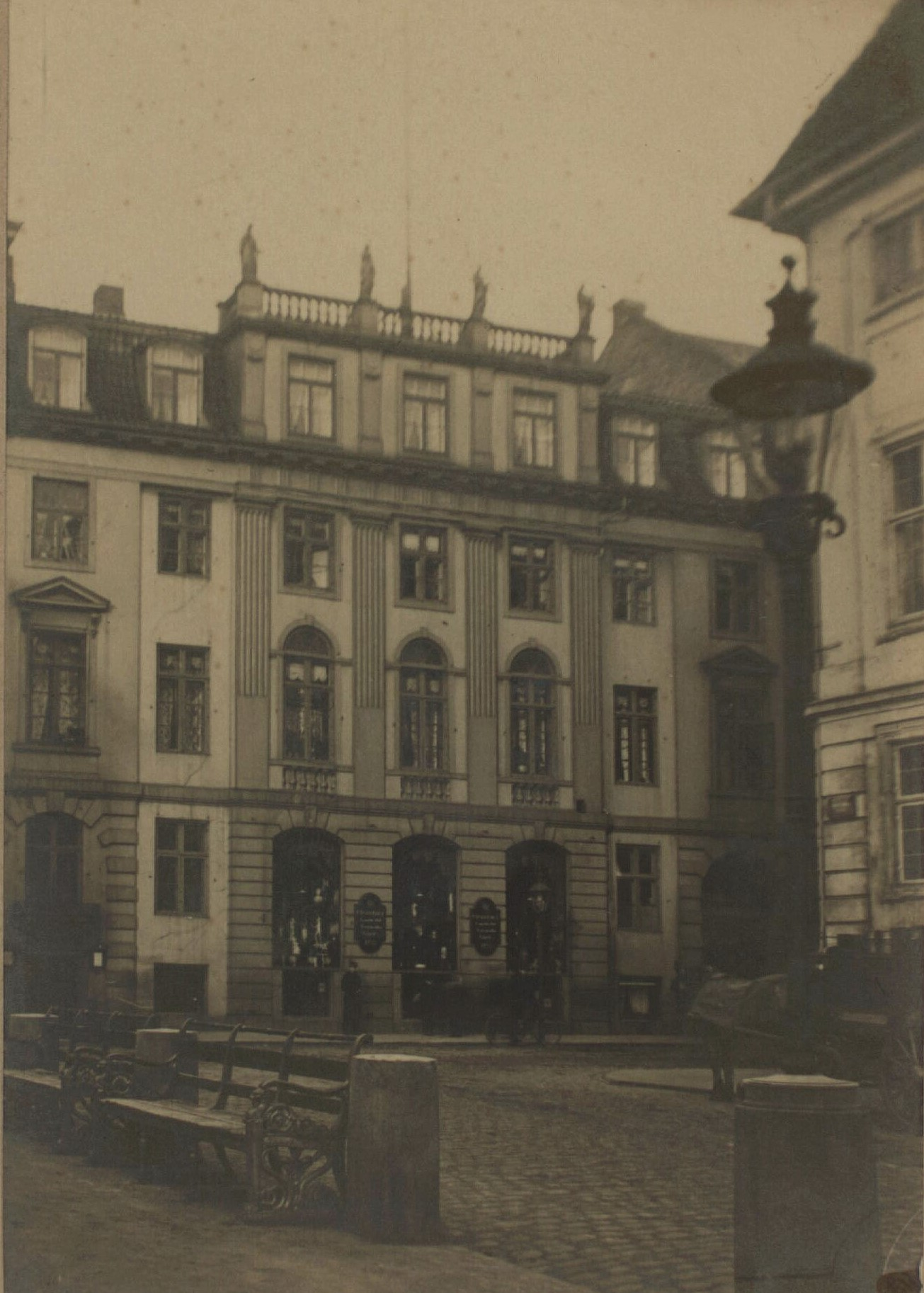
The building after the 1903 alterations

The building is three storeys tall and seven bays wide. The three central bays form a median risalit. The ground with extra-high ceilings floor was created when the original walk-out basement was removed in 1903. Its grey facade is finished with shadow joints and has tall arch-headed display windows. The two upper floors are plastered and white-painted. The upper part of the median risalit is decorated with fluted pilasters. The first-floor windows of the median risalit are arch-headed while the two lateral windows on the same floor are topped by triangular pediments supported by corbels. The facade is finished by a dentillated cornice. The roof features a three-bays wide flat-roofed window dormer, topped by a balustrade with four sculptures. The three-bay wall dormer is flanked by four dormer windows, two on each side.

=== Bredgade 33C: Lauritz Prior's atelier ===
The aterlier building (Bredgade 33C) is a three-storey building. The facade features three allegorical reliefs by Lauritz Prior, representing "sculpture", "painting" and "architecture". It also features a series of portrait reliefs by Prior, one of which one is a depiction of Bertel Thorvaldsen.

== Today ==
In 2017, Bruun Rasmussen sold the property to Jeudan. Bredgade 31 is now also part of the Bruun Tasmussen headquarters.
