= Amaliegade 49 =

Historic building in Copenhagen, Denmark

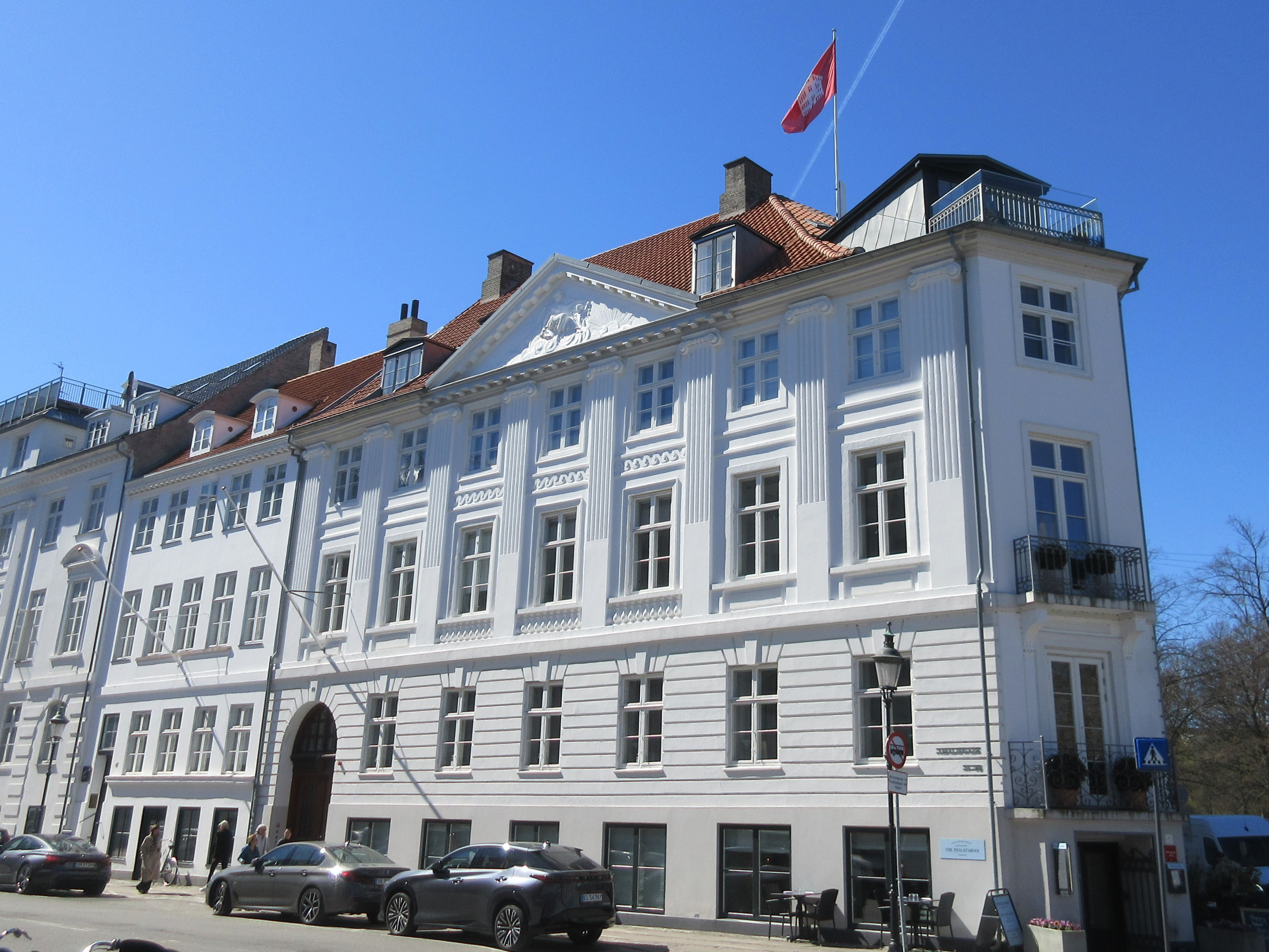
- Interactive map of the Amaliegade 49 area

General information
- Architectural style: Neoclassical
- Location: Copenhagen, Denmark
- Coordinates: 55°41′16.21″N 12°35′46.1″E
- Completed: 1788

Design and construction
- Architect: Andreas Hallander

Amaliegade 40, formerly known as Toldbodbørsen, is a Neoclassical property located at the corner of Amaliegade (No. 49) and Esplanaden (No. 48) in the Frederiksstaden district of Copenhagen, Denmark. The shipping company D/S Norden was based in the building for more than one hundred years. It was listed in the Danish registry of protected buildings and places in 1918.

== History ==
=== 18th century ===
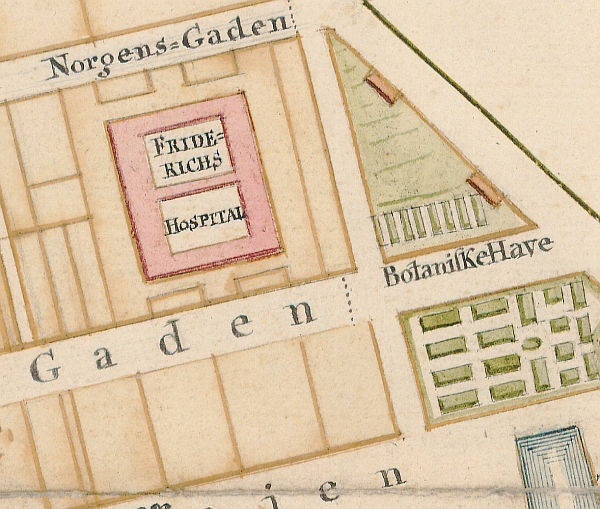
Oeder's Botanical Garden in Amaliegade

Copenhagen's second botanical garden was situated at the site from 1752. It was created by Georg Christian Oeder in the newly founded Frederiksstaden district at the request of Frederik V, at a site bisected by Amaliegade just north of Frederik's Hospital. The smaller western section, covering just under half a hectare, was equipped with a greenhouse while the eastern section remained largely unplanted. The garden was opened to the public in 1763.

The area was reacquired by the king after eight years and the botanical garden was then moved to Gammelholm. In 1781, the site in Amaliegade was instead donated to royal building inspector Caspar Frederik Harsdorff on the condition that he would "built it over with good and permanent buildings within a period of eight years". His plan for the site was a terrace with eight individual houses. He embarked on the construction later the same year but ran into economic difficulties and eventually had to give them up altogether. Andreas Hallander and Johan Martin Quist, two of his former students, saved him from bankruptcy by acquiring the Amaliegade lots. Hallander acquired the northernmost part of the area. He started with the construction of the building at the corner of Toldbodgade (No. 69 K), now Amaliegade 49). It was completed in 1788.

The property was sold to Magnus von Deernath, son-in-law of Andreas Peter Bernstorff, upon completion.

=== 19th century ===
In 1798, Deernath sold the property to Cai Reventlows. On his retirement in late 1802, he left Copenhagen, settling permanently on his estates in Holstein. In the new cadastre of 1806, his property in Amaliegade was listed as No. 134 in St. Ann's East Quarter. It was sold to architect Andreas Kirkerup the same year.

In 1808, Kirkerup sold the property to restaurateur Louis Engelbauer. He opened a restaurant in the building.

At the time of the 1834 census, No. 134 was home to eight households. August Durchholtz, a master baker, resided on the ground floor with his sister Henriette Durchholtz, his son Frederik August Durchholtz, his foster daughter Magdalene Møller and one maid. Alhed Eleonore Hetscher, a 46-year-old widow, resided in the other ground-floor apartment with her two children (aged 26 and 30), a lodger and a maid. Ane Kristine Gerlack, a 61-year-old married woman, resided on the first floor with her two daughters (aged 20 and 26), a lodger and a maid. Fransika Anthon Widl, a royal cook for Prince Frederik, resided in the other first floor apartment with his wife Sophie Sørensen, their two children (aged two and four) and two maids. Carl August de Coninck, a secretary in the Supreme Court, resided on the second floor with the 23-year-old lodger Carl August Bierfreund. Johan Christian Hjelte, a lieutenant and teacher at the Army Cadet Academy, resided in the other second floor apartment. Søren Andersen, a workman, resided in the basement with a maid. Lars Olsen, another workman, resided in the building with his wife Johanne Cathrine Jacobsen, their three children (aged five to ten) and one maid.

A restaurant had opened on the ground floor by 1840. Carl Christian Frederich Burmeister, the restaurateur, resided in the associated dwelling with his wife Henriette Martine Mildenstein, their four children (aged two to twenty), five employees and four lodgers. The eldest son, Carl Christian Burmeister, would later be a co-founder of Burmeister & Wain. Anders Adolph Aspegren, a merchant (grosserer), resided in one of the first floor apartments with his wife Amalie Charlotte Hansen, their four children (aged three to nine), a male servant and two maids. Mads Birch Jespersen, a Quarantine official, resided in the other first floor apartment with his wife Johanne Marie Petersen, his wife's two sisters and four lodgers. Marie Kirstine (née Herløw, 1788–1842), widow of Louis de Coninck (1788–1840), resided on the second floor with her 23-year-old daughter Wilhelmine, her nephew Wilhelmine Herløw, three other family members and one maid. Hans Peter Holst, a teacher, resided in the other second floor apartment with his wife Maria Holm, their four-year-old son, a maid and five lodgers. The proprietors of two taverns and a baker resided with their families and employees in the basement.

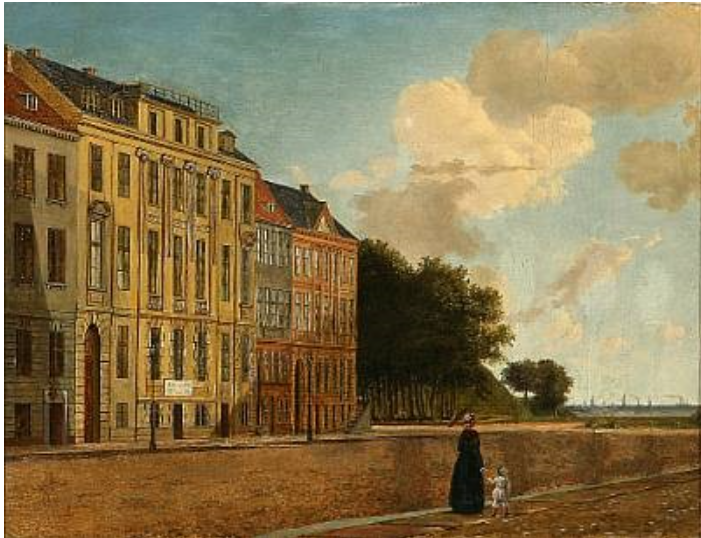
Amaliegade 47 in the middle of the 19th century

At the time of the 1845 census, No. 134 was home to six households in Amaliegade and six households in Toldbodvejen (now Esplanaden). Charles de Teilmann, a høfjægermester from Nørholm Manor in Jutland, resided in the building with his wife Fru de Teilmann. Georg von Peincin, an army major, resided in the building with his son Baron Ernst Peincin. Peter Ephraim Sletting (1792–1862), a captain in the Royal Danish Navy, resided in the building with his wife Petrine Sletting née Brønnum, their five children (aged 13 to 20), a 15-year-old niece and two maids. Anders Adolph Aspegreen was still residing in the building with his wife, their three children, a housekeeper, a male servant and two maids. Carl C.F. Burmeister was also still occupying the ground floor. Jacob Hansen, the proprietor of a tavern in the basement, resided in the associated dwelling with his wife Cicilie Hansen, their two-year-old son, his 72-year-old mother-in-law, a maid and two lodgers. Hans Jørgen Trojel, a jurist, resided in an apartment towards Toldbodvejen with his wife Marie Henriette (née Hansen) and one maid. Painter Frederik Sødring resided in another Toldbodvej apartment with his wife Henriette Sødring (née Bang) and two maids. Frederik Johannes Herman von Huth (1814–1882), a first lieutenant in the 5th Battalion, resided in another apartment with his wife Adolphine Eleonora Emilie Huth (née Møller), their two daughters (aged one and three) and one maid. Mads Birch Jespersen was still residing in another apartment. Laurine Kunstrup (née Holbeck) resided in another apartment with one maid. Lars Olsen, the proprietor of the tavern on Toldbodvej, resided in the associated dwelling with his wife Johanne Jacobsen, their three children (aged 10 to 21), a maid and two male servants.

=== Blankensteiners ===
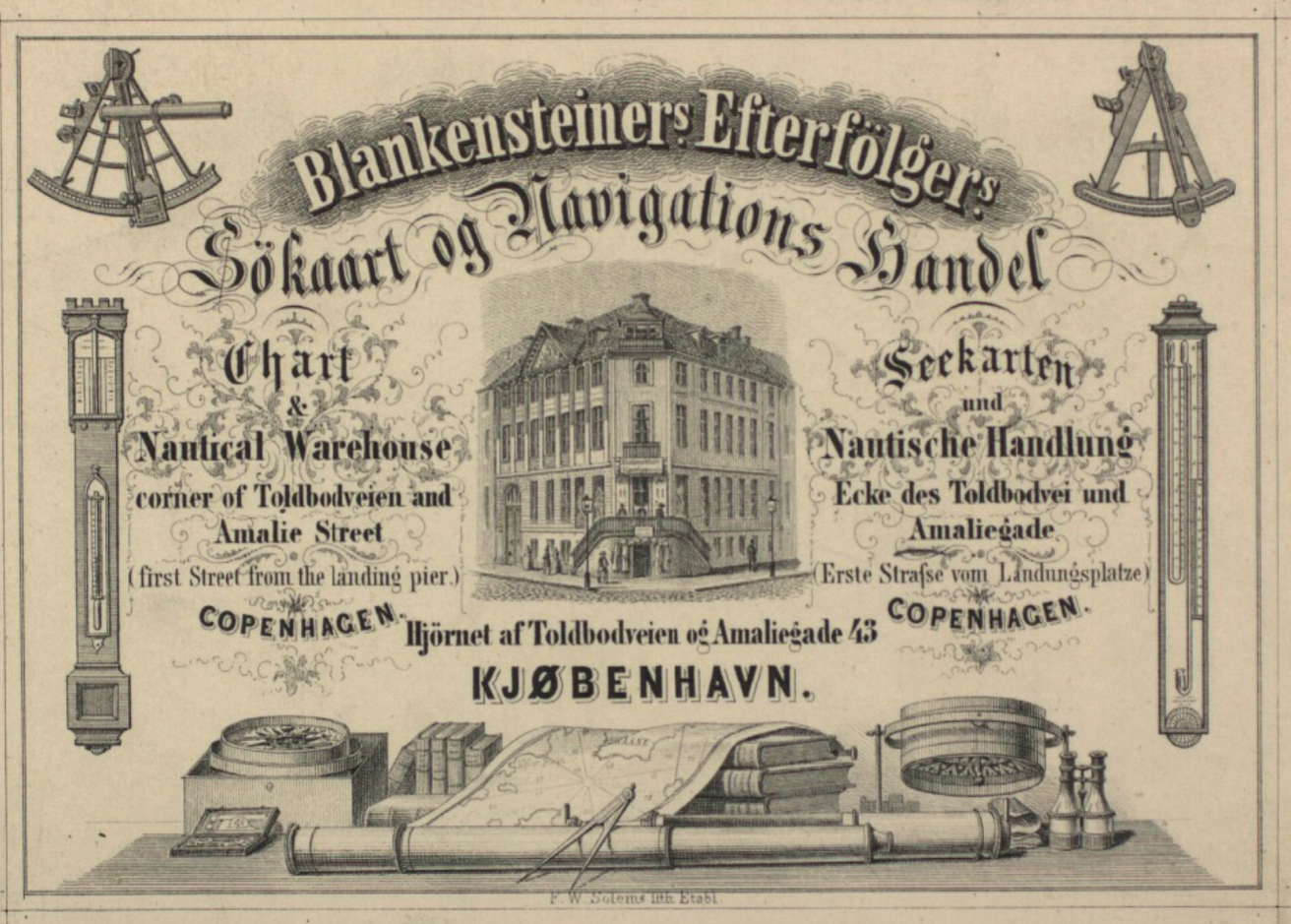
Advertisement card for Blankensteiners efterfølgers søkort og navigationshandel

Blankensteiners efterfølgers søkort og navigationshandel, a store that specialized in nautical charts, books and equipment, was based out of the ground floor for many years. The company was founded by Johan Georg Blankensteiner (born 1753) in 1797 and later taken over by C. A. Blankensteiner in 1844. He sold it to August Busck (born 1836) in 1858. Buck sold it to captain J. W. A. Jensen in 1903. It was acquired by Christian Bønnelycke (born 1891) in 1937 and existed at least until the 1950s.

=== Later history ===
The shipping company D/S Norden was headquartered in the building from 1782. The company expanded its premises several times over the years. In 1917, D/S Norden purchased the building for DKK 325,000. In 2008, D/S Norden relocated to new premises in Tuborg Havn.

== Architecture ==
The building consists of three floors over a high cellar. The main facade on Amaliegade is seven bays long. It has rustication on the ground floor and Ionic order pilasters between the windows on the two upper floors. The three central bays are tipped by a triangular pediment with a relief of a seated woman holding a monocular. The putto by her side was supposedly moulded by Bertel Thorvaldsen according to a drawing by Nicolaus Wolff (1762–1813). A gate in the left hand side of the building opens to a central courtyard. The facade on Esplanaden is also seven bays long but without decorative elements. The two facades are joined by a chamfered corner bay.

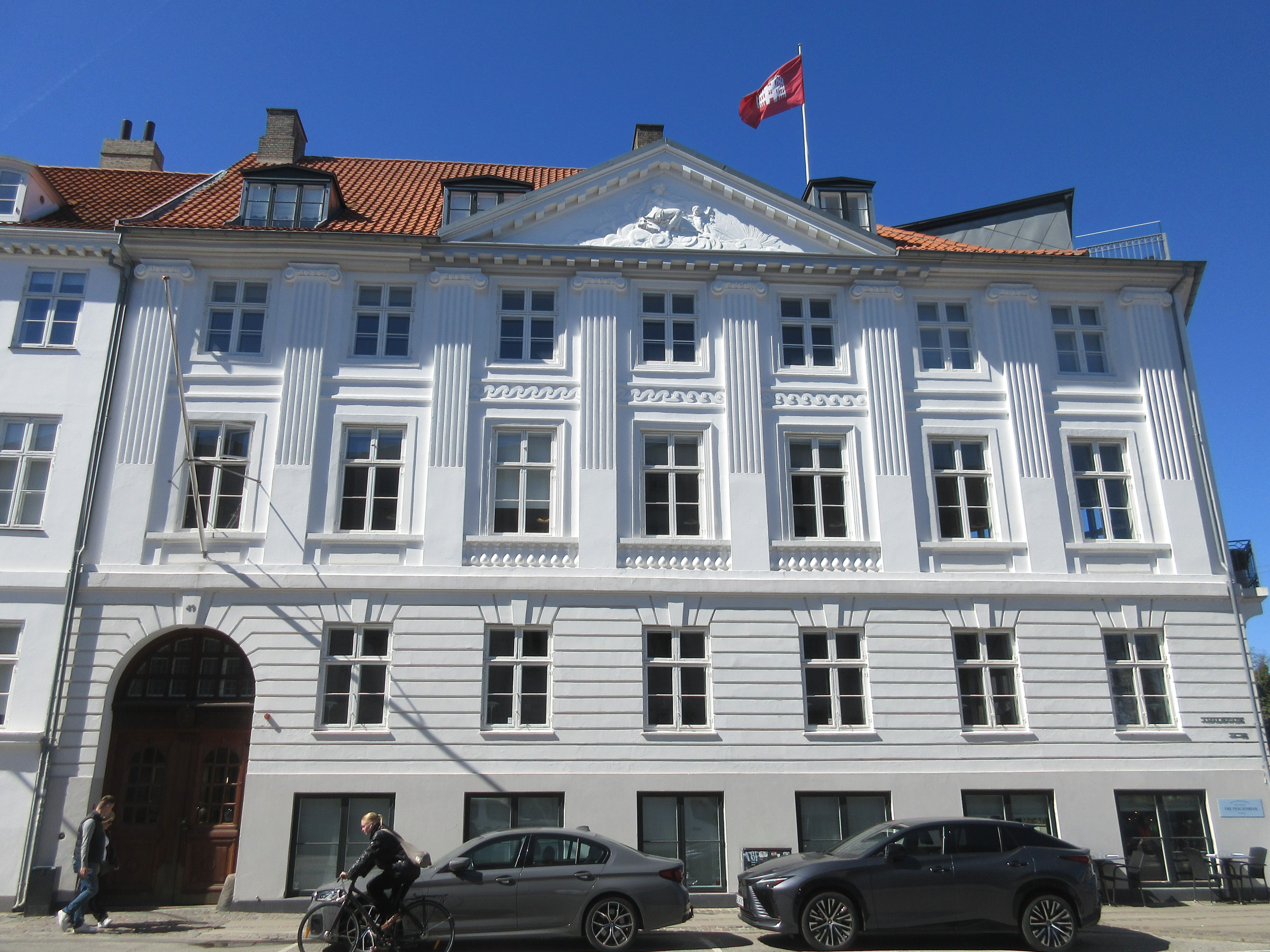
The facade on Amaliegade.

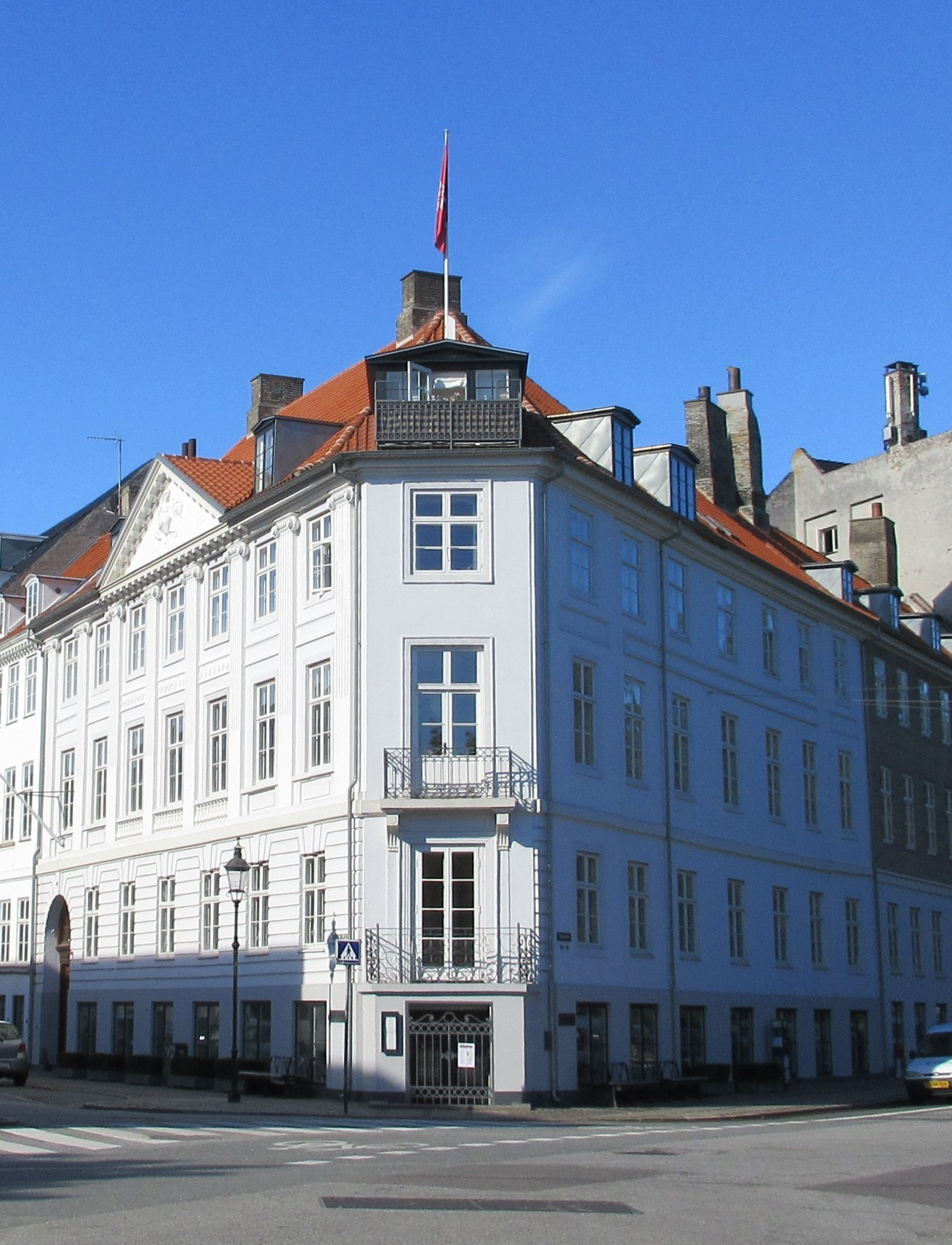
The building seen from the corner.

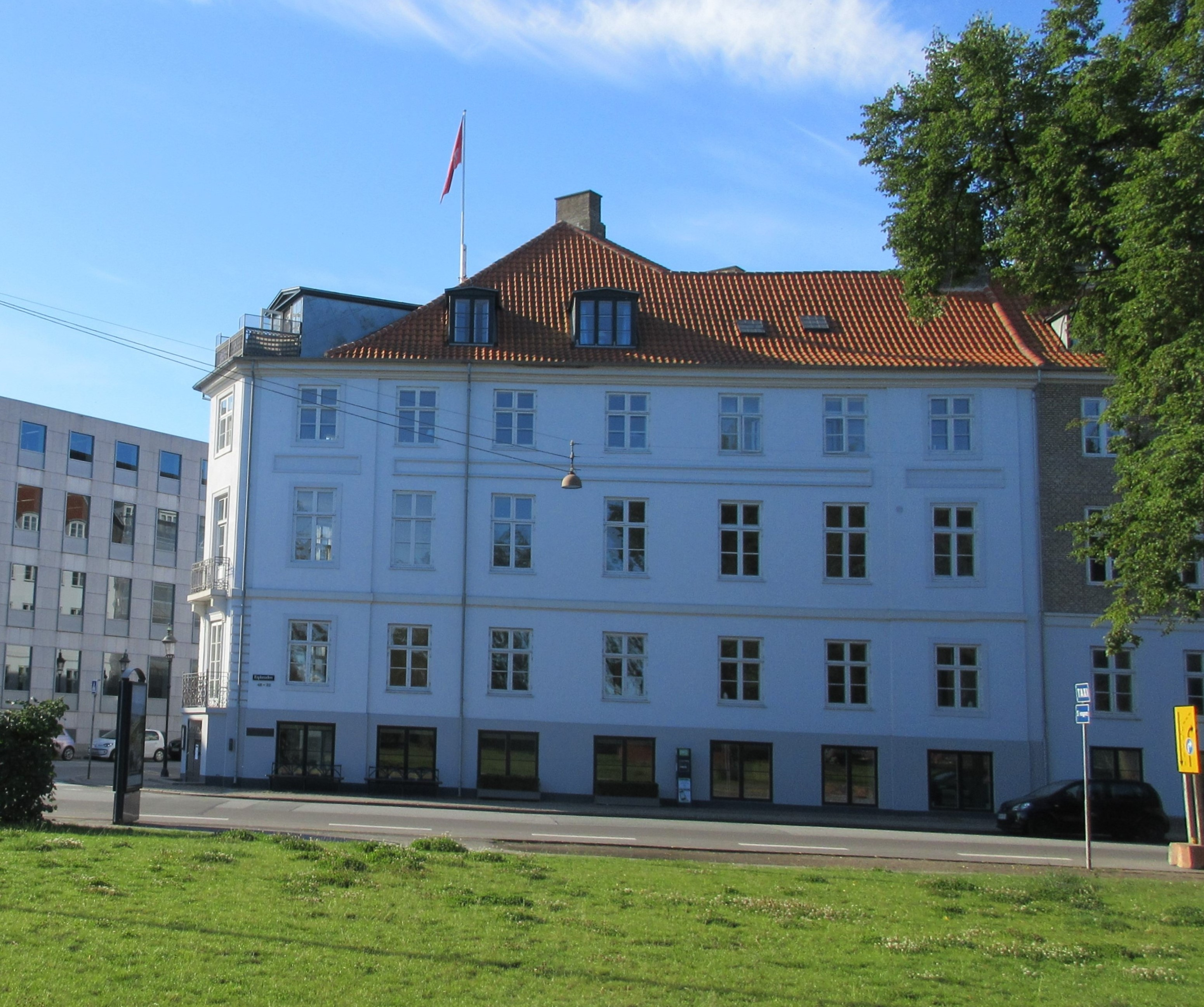
The facade on Esplanaden seen from Churchill Park.

== Today ==
Axcel founder Christian Frigast, Danske Bank chairman Ole Andersen, former Nordea CEO Christian Clausen and Mærsk chairman Jim Hagemann Snabe created an office community in the building in 2006.

=== Restaurant ===
Restaurant Grønbech og Churchill opened in the basement of the building with Rasmus Grønbech as head chef in March 2011 and received a star in the Michelin Guide in 2012. It kept its star until its closure in October 2016. Restaurant Esplanaden 48, a lunch restaurant, is now based in the basement.
