= DFDS =

Danish international shipping and logistics corporation

DFDS A/S

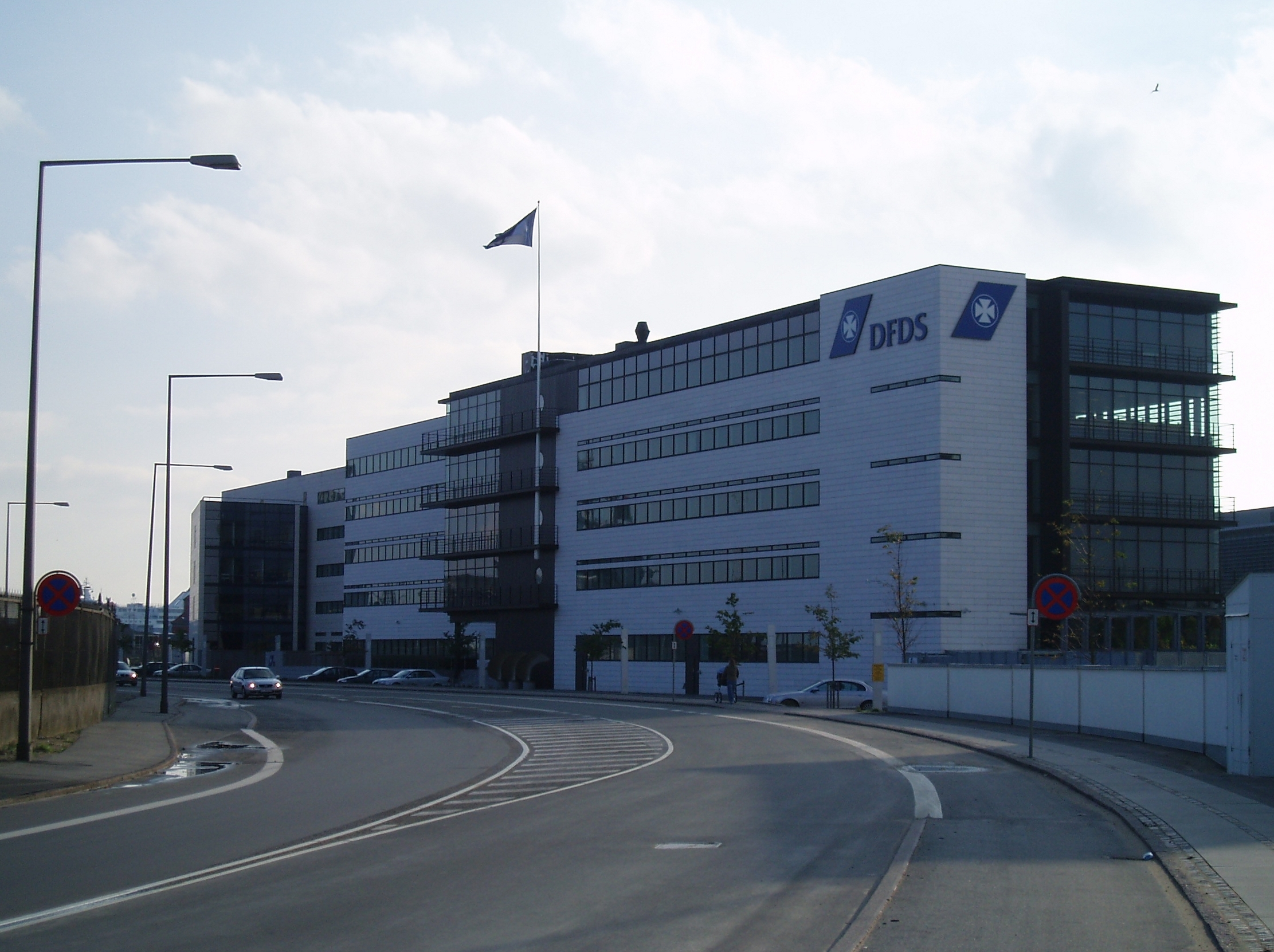
- Headquarters in Copenhagen
- Type: Aktieselskab
- Traded as: Nasdaq Copenhagen: DFDS
- Industry: Shipping and logistics
- Founded: 1866; 160 years ago
- Founder: Carl Frederik Tietgen
- Headquarters: Copenhagen, Denmark
- Number of locations: 20 countries in Europe
- Key people: Torben Carlsen (CEO); Claus V. Hemmingsen (Chairman)
- Services: Freight transport (over sea, land and rail), ferry cruises, logistics.
- Revenue: ▲17.87 billion kr. (2021)
- Operating income: ▲3.41 billion kr. (2021)
- Net income: ▲976 million kr. (2021)
- Total assets: ▲30.72 billion kr. (2021)
- Total equity: ▲11.55 billion kr. (2021)
- Owner: Lauritzen Foundation 42.8%
- Number of employees: 14,000 (2024)
- Divisions: DFDS Seaways; New Channel Company A/S
- Website: dfds.com

DFDS is a Danish international shipping and logistics company. The company's name is an abbreviation of Det Forenede Dampskibs-Selskab (literally The United Steamship Company). DFDS was founded in 1866, when C.F. Tietgen merged the three biggest Danish steamship companies of that day.

Although DFDS has generally concentrated on freight and passenger traffic on the North Sea and to the Baltic Sea, it has also operated freight services to the US, South America, and the Mediterranean in the past. Since the 1980s, DFDS's focus for shipping has been on northern Europe. Today, DFDS operates a network of 25 routes with 50 freight and passenger ships in the North Sea, Baltic Sea, and the English Channel under the name DFDS Seaways. The rail and land-based haulage and container activities are operated by DFDS Logistics. Overall, DFDS employed around 14,000 people as of 2024.

== History ==
=== The Beginnings ===
Det Forenede Dampskibs-Selskab was formed on 11 December 1866, as a merger of the three biggest Danish steamship companies under the leadership of a Danish financier Carl Frederik Tietgen. Operations began on 1 January 1867 with 19 ships with Copenhagen as the main starting point. The company was initially based in the Prior House at Bredgade 33. The company's routes at the time were from Denmark to Norway, the Baltic, Belgium, the United Kingdom, Iceland, and The Faeroe Islands, with ships carrying both freight and passengers. As the company grew, new connections were opened to Sweden, France, the Mediterranean and Black Sea, as well as North America and South America. In addition, DFDS operated various domestic services in Denmark. After the continued expansion of the fleet in the 1880s, DFDS became one of the world's ten largest ship-owning companies. After the takeover of Dampskibsselskabet Thingvalla in 1898, the Scandinavian-American Line was established. A long relationship with shipbuilder Helsingørs Jernskibs og Maskinbyggeri A/S (Elsinore Shipbuilding & Engineering Co.) began with delivery of the 1,386 GRT steamer Arno in 1898 for service in the Mediterranean. The last ship Helsingørs delivered was Dana Minerva, a 1,599 GRT roll on/roll off ship, in 1978. (Note: Poulsen lists 83 ships built by Helsingørs for DFDS.) The Scandinavian-American Line continued trading to the United States until 1935.

=== The Two World Wars ===
==== First World War ====
The First World War took a heavy toll on the DFDS fleet, with 26 ships lost. During the post-war depression, a further 30 ships were laid up. The company revived with the establishment of new routes, and by the mid-1920s, the fleet consisted of 124 ships with a combined tonnage of 233,364 GRT.

==== Second World War ====
The Second World War saw further losses to the company, with nine ships lost before the German invasion of Denmark in April 1940. A large number of DFDS ships fell into British hands after the German invasion, and they were used as troopships. German forces commandeered a total of 21 DFDS ships during the war. One DFDS ship, the Kronprins Frederik, was under construction when the war began. To prevent her usage by the Germans, vital engine parts were "lost", only to be discovered after the end of the war.

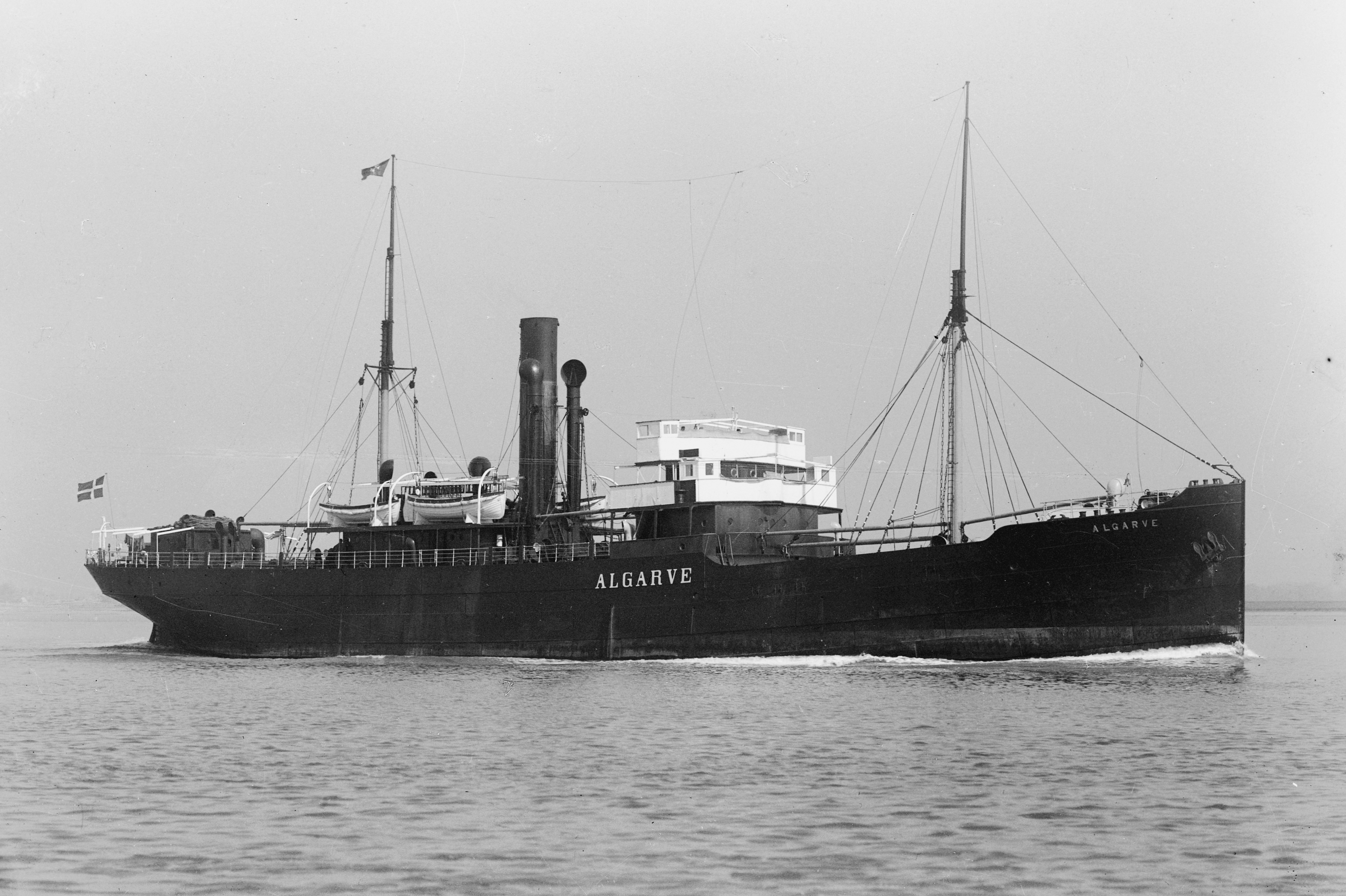
Algarve was lost in 1941

Ships, representing about a fourth of the total Danish tonnage, sought refuge from seizure by belligerents in neutral ports. Those ships sat idle with orders not to depart neutral ports and for their seamen not to sign on with other ships. In the United States orders for their seizure were issued on 30 March 1941 and 40 ships were seized and placed under the control of the War Shipping Administration which registered most in Panama for diplomatic reasons and assigned commercial companies for operation. Several were assigned to either the U.S. Army or Navy. Two of the DFDS ships are examples. Sicilien became the U.S. Army Transport Sicilien which was sunk by torpedo in June 1942. Tunis survived the war as USS Aquila (AK-47) and was returned to Denmark with the other surviving ships after the war.

In total, DFDS lost 31 ships during World War II, with a further three ships lost due to hitting mines after the end of the war. In 1948, 48 people drowned when Kjøbenhavn hit a mine. Five people lost their lives in the mine explosion of Ivar in 1949 and, as recently as 1950, Frigga sank, without loss of life, after having hit a mine. To replace some of the lost ships, several almost-completed motor ships, which had been laid up awaiting the end of the war, were made ready. Gradually, the routes that had been discontinued since the beginning of the war, were reopened.

=== Between the Wars ===
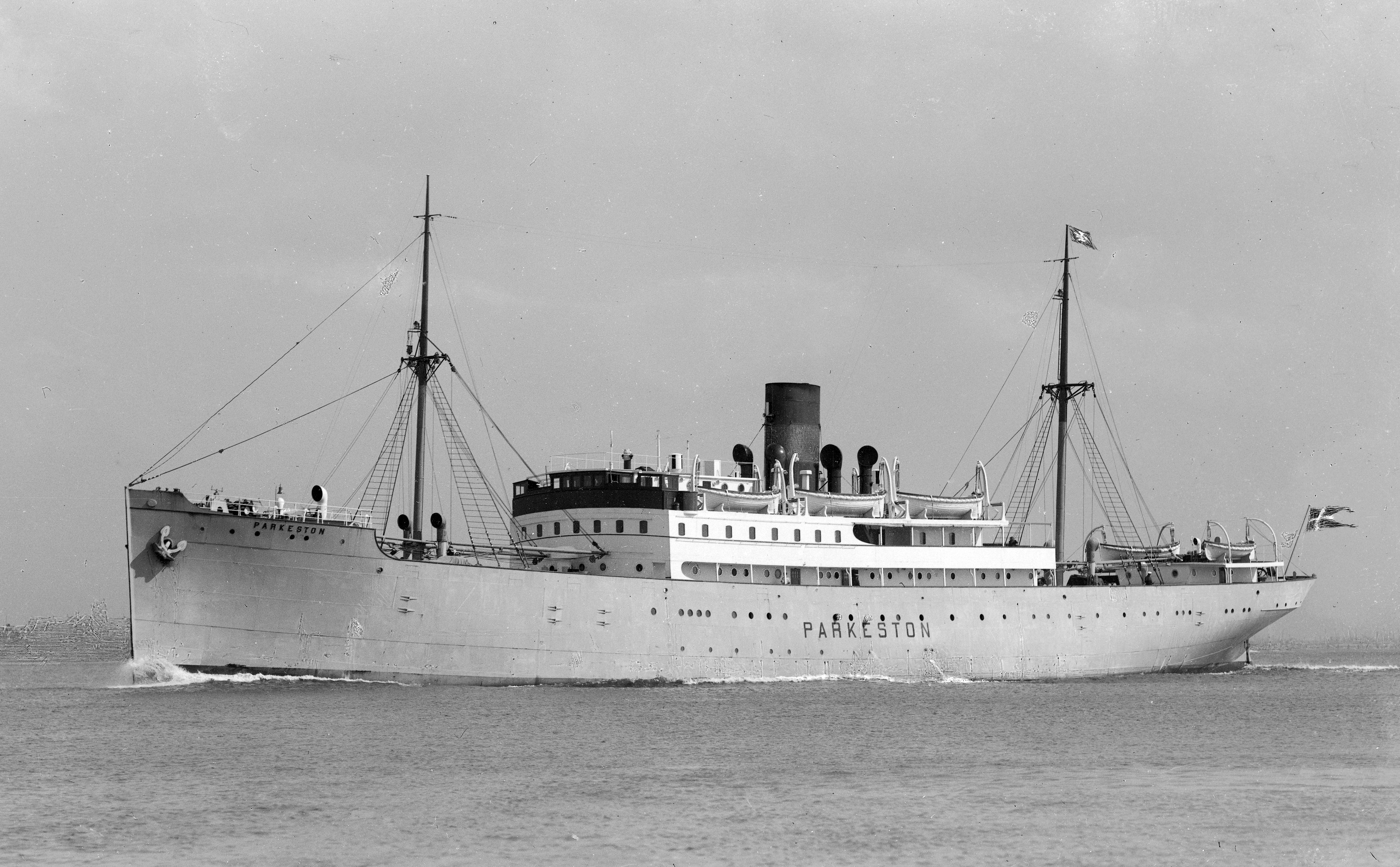
Passenger ship Parkeston

DFDS created a sensation when they launched the world's first motor-driven short-sea passenger ship in 1925, from Helsingørs Jernskibs of Maskinbyggeri A/S. The first of four sister vessels built between 1925 and 1932, the M.V. Parkeston ( 2,762 GRT ) made her maiden voyage from Esbjerg to Harwich on 8 October 1925 at an average speed of 16.5 knots, burning 18 tons of oil per day compared with 55 tons of coal burnt by a similar predecessor on the route. The shipyard had in 1924 completed and delivered the DFDS ship Odense, a diesel passenger-cargo ship of 550 GRT. After completing Jylland in 1926, sister of Parkeston, DFDS took delivery in 1927 of the 1,854 GRT Dronning Alexandrine. The series of 2,762 GRT ships was completed with Esbjerg in 1929 and England in 1932. The next DFDS ship delivered by Helsingørs after England was the first of four motor cargo ships, Tunis delivered in 1936.

=== The Fifties & Sixties ===
In 1950, DFDS was one of the first to introduce a door-to-door solution. Two ships were specially designed to transport small wooden containers. DFDS commenced a new service, linking the Danish mainland to Greenland. This was discontinued in 1959. In 1957, Gordana Line - cargo service Gulf of Mexico-Mediterranean - began. For the first time in DFDS's history, the company played the role of cross-trader. 1964 saw the introduction of the first ro-ro passenger ferry, when MS England entered service on a route connecting Esbjerg to Harwich. In 1965, the Transport Rationalization Department, which later became DFDS Transport, began its activities. M.S. Akershus, the first real passenger-and-car ship which could also take trucks and trailers, entered service on the Frederikshavn-Oslo route.

In 1966, a hundred years after its start, the DFDS fleet consisted of 13 passenger ships, 53 cargo vessels, 4 tugboats, and 39 barges. A comprehensive new ship program commenced, with 25 ships on order. The passenger ships served on routes connecting Denmark to Norway, the UK, the Faroe Islands, Iceland, and Finland (though the Finland service was discontinued in 1966) alongside domestic services. The freight services continued, linking Denmark to the Americas and various European and Mediterranean ports. Botnia, the last steamship, was sold after more than 50 years of service. Between 1967 and 1970, four identical car-passenger ferries, originally named Kong Olav V, Prinsesse Margarethe, Aalborghus and Trekroner, entered service on the Copenhagen—Oslo, and Copenhagen—Aalborg routes. However, the Copenhagen—Aalborg service was closed in 1970.

=== The Seventies & Eighties ===
Subsequently, the Aalborghus and Trekroner were rebuilt and renamed Dana Sirena and Dana Corona, respectively, for ferry services on the Mediterranean. Confusingly, the ships' names were later reversed, with Dana Sirena becoming Dana Corona and vice versa. For the Denmark—UK service, new ships arrived in 1974 and 1978 in the form of MS Dana Regina and MS Dana Anglia, respectively. Domestic passenger traffic was discontinued in 1970 and domestic freight service in 1971. A great chapter in the history of DFDS had come to an end. The requirement for transport of cars was sharply on the rise at the beginning of the 1970s. Tonnage was designed to accommodate this, and all DFDS passenger routes were served by passenger ships with roll-on/roll-off facilities.

The 1980s saw a period of growth for DFDS, with the acquisition of Tor Line and Prinzenlinien. In addition to the ferries Tor Britannia, Tor Scandinavia and MS Prinz Hamlet which were acquired with these two deals, DFDS also purchased the Effoa ferry Wellamo in 1981, renaming Dana Gloria. Following this brief expansion, in 1982, the Mediterranean ferry services were discontinued and in 1984 DFDS gave up its deep-sea cargo routes completely, now concentrating solely on the European market. 1982 also saw the beginning of an ambitious project of operating a large ferry/cruise ship, MS Scandinavia, on the US East Coast under the brand of Scandinavian World Cruises. However, in 1983, the Scandinavia was moved to the Copenhagen—Oslo service and sold two years later.

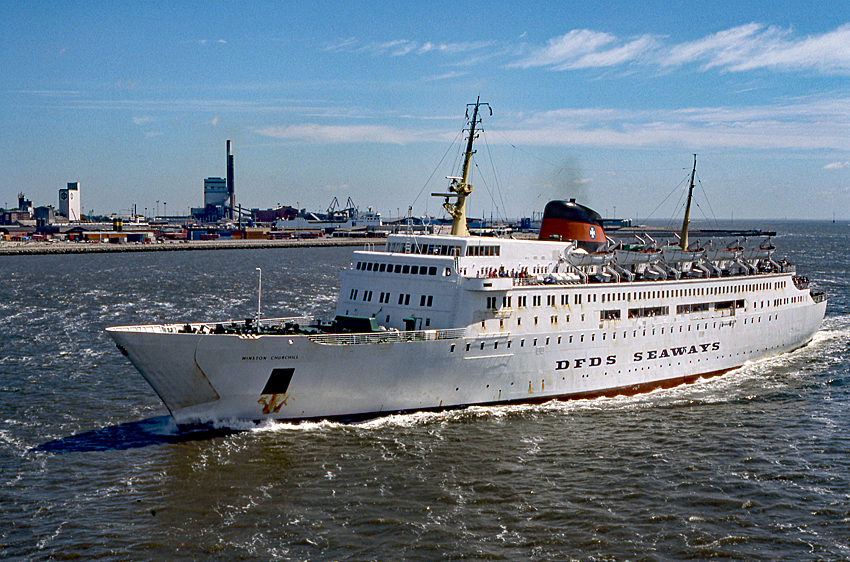
Winston Churchill departing Esbjerg for Newcastle, 1986

From 1982 to 1983, DFDS's passenger operations were branded as DFDS Danish Seaways (Esbjerg—Harwich/Newcastle upon Tyne/Tórshavn, Copenhagen—Oslo, Newcastle upon Tyne—Oslo), DFDS Tor Line (Gothenburg—Harwich/Newcastle upon Tyne/Amsterdam) and DFDS Prins Ferries (Harwich—Hamburg/Bremerhaven). DFDS also operated the Fred. Olsen Bergen Line routes Newcastle upon Tyne—Stavanger/Bergen and Stavanger—Amsterdam.. In 1987, the Transport Division and the Liner Division merged into DFDS Transport. The new division soon expanded, first in Sweden, and subsequently acquired several forwarding companies, e.g. in the UK and the Netherlands. In 1988, it was decided to use Scandinavian Seaways for the DFDS passenger operations as a whole.

=== The Nineties ===
In 1989-1990, the tonnage on the Oslo—Copenhagen route was renewed with the entering into service in June 1990 of Queen Of Scandinavia, a ship with a capacity of 2,000 passengers and 400 cars. Queen was followed, in 1994, by Crown Of Scandinavia, with a similar capacity. In 1999, DFDS took over Dan Transport Holding, including the Dan Transport Travel Bureau and Canal Tours Copenhagen. However, 17 months later, the whole transport division, named DFDS Dan Transport Group, was sold to transport group DSV, and the focus was once again on the former core business activities; roll-on/roll-off liner traffic and passenger shipping on overnight routes.

=== As of 2000 ===
In June 2001, the deal to acquire a 76.4 percent shareholding in the Lithuanian shipping company LISCO was finalized. Lys-Line Rederi AS and Lys-Line AS were taken over 100 percent by DFDS in 2005. In August 2005 DFDS purchased 66 percent of the trailer-forwarding company Halléns in Belgium. In 2006, DFDS acquired the container shipping company Norfolk Line Containers. In 2010, DFDS purchased Norfolkline from Maersk. In 2010, DFDS sold DFDS Canal Tours because it was not regarded as a core activity.

Since 2013 DFDS has run its shared services center in the Globis Poznań next to the Poznań International Fair.

== Current operations ==
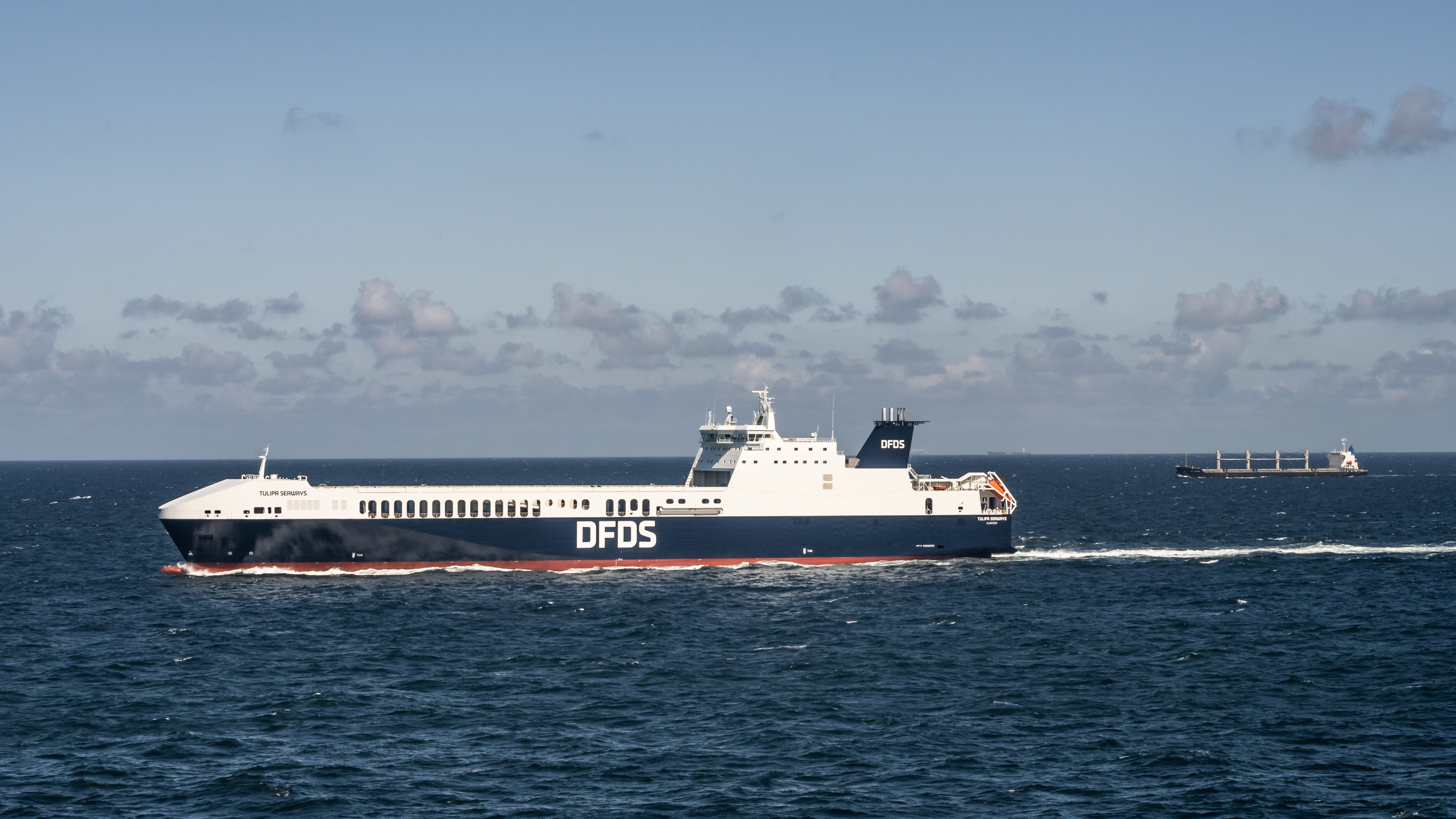
RoRo ferry Tulipa Seaways

DFDS Seaways is the shipping division of DFDS A/S operating a network of 25 shipping routes with 50 freight and passenger ships on the North Sea, Baltic Sea, and the English Channel. DFDS Logistics operates land transport and logistics activities including the former DFDS Lys Line and DFDS Container Line. Below is an overview of the shipping activities that are integrated into the DFDS Group.

DFDS Tor Line

DFDS Tor Line was the main freight-carrying division of DFDS. It operated a large number of RO-RO freighters on the North Sea as well as the Baltic Sea. It was formed as a merger of DFDS's and Tor Line's freight operations after DFDS bought the latter in 1982 (until 1988 the passenger service between Sweden and the United Kingdom was also marketed as DFDS Tor Line). The operation of the DFDS Tor Line was integrated into DFDS following the acquisition of Norfolkline in 2010.

=== DFDS Lisco ===
DFDS Lisco was a Lithuanian subsidiary acquired by DFDS in 2001. It operated five lines with seven ferries for passengers and freight connecting Germany to Lithuania, Latvia, and Russia as well as Germany to Sweden. DFDS Lisco had subsidiaries in Germany (DFDS Lisco GmbH), Sweden (DFDS Tor Line AB), Latvia (DFDS Tor Line SIA), and Russia (OOO DFDS Lisco). The operation of DFDS Lisco was integrated into DFDS Seaways following the acquisition of Norfolkline in 2010.

=== DFDS Lys Line ===
DFDS Lys Line transported freight from Norway, Sweden, and Denmark to Germany, the Netherlands, Belgium, the United Kingdom, Ireland, Spain, Portugal, and Italy, offering door-to-door transportation. The company was founded in 1970. The operation of DFDS Lys Line was integrated into DFDS following the acquisition of Norfolkline in 2010.

=== DFDS Container Line ===
DFDS Container Line transports containers between Ireland and the Netherlands. On October 2, 2006, the acquisition of Norfolkline Containers by DFDS A/S was completed. Established in August 1997 Norfolkline Containers was set up to offer Direct Port-to-Port services between Ireland and mainland Europe. The operation of the DFDS Container Line was integrated into DFDS following the acquisition of Norfolkline in 2010.

=== Norfolkline ===
Norfolkline was a European ferry operator and logistics company owned by Maersk. It provided freight ferry services on the English Channel, Irish Sea, and the North Sea; passenger ferry services on the English Channel and the Irish Sea; and logistics services across Europe. Norfolkline employed more than 2,200 employees in 13 countries across Europe, operating out of 35 different locations. It was acquired by DFDS in July 2010. Maersk received a 31.3 percent stake in DFDS as part payment. After a two-year lock-up period the shares were sold in September 2013.

=== DFDS Denizcilik Tasimacilik A.S (ex-name U.N. Ro-Ro) ===
DFDS Denizcilik operates four freight ferry routes connecting Turkey with Trieste in Italy, Sete in France, and Tarragona in Spain with 16 freight ferries and its port terminals in Istanbul and Trieste. In Europe, the company also offers intermodal solutions to and from other European markets. The company has an annual revenue of EUR 240 million and 500 employees. In June 2018, European shipping and logistics group DFDS acquired the Turkish shipping company U.N. Ro-Ro .

=== Ekol Logistics ===
In April 2024 DFDS announced a takeover of Ekol Logistics pending EU approval, citing a bid of €260 million.

== Bibliography ==
- Poulsen, Hanne (2016). "HELSINGØR VÆRFT 1882-1982" (PDF). M/S Museet for Søfart. Helsingør, Denmark: Museet for Søfart.
- Thorsøe, Søren (1991). DFDS 1866-1991: Ship Development through 125 years - from Paddle Steamer to Ro/Ro Ship (in Danish and English). DFDS/The World Ship Society. ISBN 87-980030-0-3.
