= SS Algarve =

Danish cargo steamship

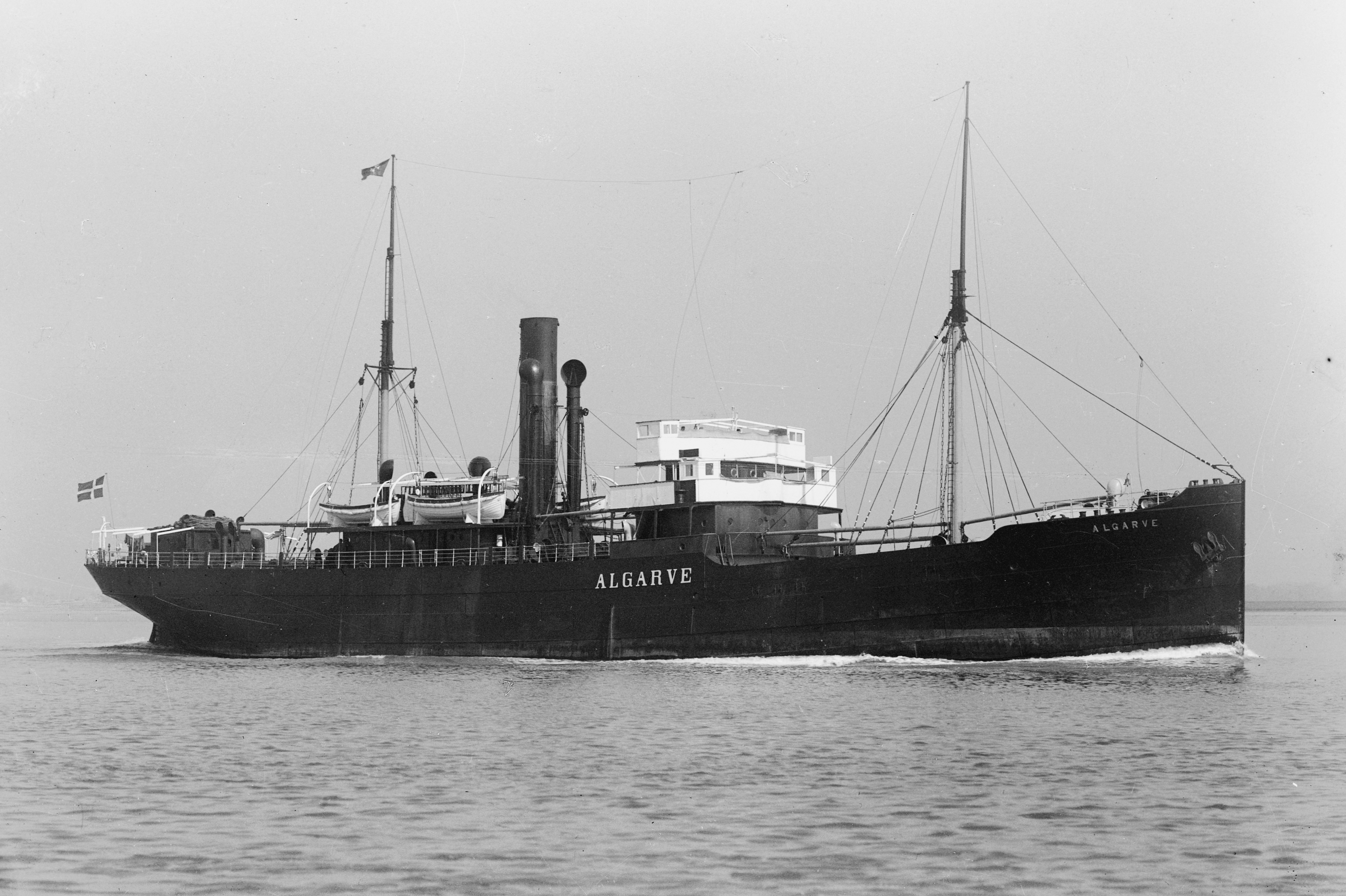
- Algarve on the river Scheldt

History
- Name: Algarve
- Namesake: Algarve
- Owner: 1921: DFDS; 1940: Ministry of War Transport
- Operator: 1921: DFDS; 1940: Christian Salvesen
- Port of registry: 1921: (Denmark) Copenhagen; 1940: (United Kingdom) London
- Builder: Frederikshavn V&D, Frederikshavn
- Yard number: 166
- Launched: 13 January 1921
- Completed: 1921
- Identification: code letters NDCG (1921–33); call sign OXZO (1934–40); UK official number 167528 (1940–41); call sign GLJL (1940–41)
- Fate: Sunk by torpedo, 19 February 1941

General characteristics
- Type: Cargo ship
- Tonnage: 1930: 1,307 GRT, 751 NRT; 1935: 1,355 GRT, 784 NRT
- Length: 254.6 ft (77.6 m)
- Beam: 37.2 ft (11.3 m)
- Depth: 16.0 ft (4.9 m)
- Decks: 1
- Installed power: as built: 175 NHP
- Propulsion: as built: triple-expansion engine; from 1937: as above plus low-pressure steam turbine
- Speed: 10 knots (19 km/h)
- Notes: sister ships: Broholm, Egholm

SS Algarve was a Danish cargo steamship that was built in 1921 for DFDS. After Germany invaded Denmark in April 1940 Algarve was transferred to the UK Ministry of War Transport. In 1941 an E-boat sank her with all hands in the North Sea.

This was the second DFDS ship to be called Algarve. The first was a cargo steamship that was built in Scotland in 1899, bought by the UK government in 1917 and sunk by a U-boat that same year.

== Building and peacetime history ==
In the 1920s Frederikshavn Værft & Flydedok in Frederikshavn in northern Denmark built a series of small cargo ships for DFDS. Algarve was completed in 1921. Frederikshavn also built her two sister ships: Egholm in 1924 and Broholm in 1925.

Algarve's registered length was 254.6 ft (77.6 m), her beam was 37.2 ft (11.3 m) and her depth was 16.0 ft (4.9 m). Egholm was built to the same dimensions. Broholm was the same except that her beam was 6 in (150 mm) broader.

The three ships had different types of steam engine. Algarve had a 175 NHP, three-cylinder triple-expansion engine, built by David Rowan & Co of Glasgow, Scotland. Egholm had a steam turbine with double-reduction gearing. Broholm had a 99 IHP, four-cylinder compound engine built by Svendborg Msk in Svendborg.

DFDS registered Algarve in Copenhagen. Her code letters were NDCG until 1934, when the call sign OXZO superseded them. Her tonnages were 1,307 GRT and 751 NRT until 1935, when they were revised to 1,355 GRT and 784 NRT. By 1937 Algarve was equipped with a low-pressure steam turbine, powered by steam from the low-pressure cylinder of her piston engine.

== Second World War service ==
On 9 April 1940 Germany invaded Denmark and began its invasion of Norway. The UK Ministry of War Transport took over Algarve, registered her in London and contracted Christian Salvesen to manage her.

In August 1940 Algarve left Milford Haven with Convoy OG 41, which was bound for Gibraltar. She returned with a cargo of pit props, reaching Liverpool with Convoy HG 44 on 4 October. She then went to Canada, where she loaded timber. She made her return transatlantic crossing with Convoy SC 9 from Sydney, Nova Scotia, which reached Liverpool on 9 November.

Algarve then sailed around the north of Scotland to the North Sea. From 26 November 1940 she took part in FS (Forth South) and FN (Forth North) series convoys between the Firth of Forth and the Thames Estuary.

By February 1941 Algarve had been away from Denmark for at least 10 months. She was being worked by a mixed Danish and British crew, with a Belgian second officer. On 19 February the German motor torpedo boat S-102 torpedoed her off the Norfolk coast near Sheringham: a part of the North Sea nicknamed "E-boat alley". Algarve sank and all 27 members of her crew were killed. The youngest victims were two British 16-year-olds: her cabin boy and galley boy.
