= MV Patra =

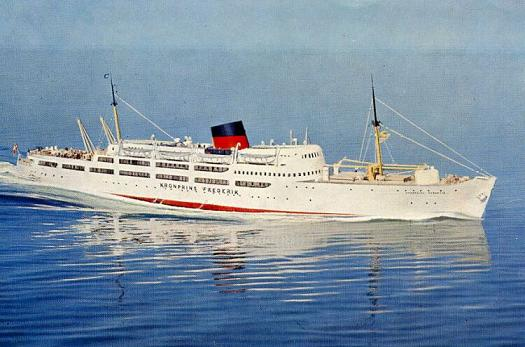
- MV Patra as Kronprins Frederik, taken on 24 July 1953.

History
- Name: Patra
- Owner: Arab Navigation Company
- Port of registry: Egypt
- Route: Jeddah–Suez (1976)
- Builder: A/S Helsingør Jernskibs- og Maskinbyggeri, Helsingør, Denmark
- Yard number: 262
- Laid down: 14 November 1939
- Launched: 20 June 1940
- In service: 1946
- Out of service: 1976
- Identification: Call sign: OZHW
- Fate: Caught fire and sank in the Red Sea on 24 December 1976

General characteristics
- Type: Passenger ferry
- Tonnage: 3,895 GRT
- Length: 114.48 m (375 ft 7 in) (overall)
- Beam: 15.20 m (49 ft 10 in)
- Draught: 5.66 m (18 ft 7 in)
- Installed power: 2 × Burmeister & Wain 1050-VF-90 diesel engines
- Propulsion: Twin screw
- Speed: 20.25 knots (37.50 km/h; 23.30 mph)
- Capacity: 358 passengers

MV Patra, formerly known as Kronprins Frederik, was a Danish-built passenger ferry constructed in 1941 at Helsingør Shipyard, Denmark. It primarily operated on North Sea routes under the ownership of Det Forenede Dampskibs-Selskab (DFDS). In March 1976, the ship was sold to the Arab Navigation Company of Suez and was renamed to Patra. On 24 December 1976, the ferry sank after catching fire while en route from Jeddah to Suez in the Red Sea.

== History ==
=== Construction ===
On 11 January 1939, Det Forenede Dampskibs-Selskab A/S of Denmark ordered a passenger liner for its DFDS North Sea service. The ship was named after Crown Prince Frederik of Denmark, who later became King Frederik IX. The vessel was built in the A/S Helsingør Jernskibs og Maskinbygerri shipyard, located in Helsingør, Denmark in yard No. 262. On 14 November 1939, the keel was laid, and Kronprins Frederik was launched on 20 June 1940. The overall length measured 114.48 metres (375 ft 7 in), the beam measuring 15.20 m (49 ft 10 in), and the draft measuring 5.66 m (18 ft 7 in). The ship was assessed at 1,720 tons deadweight (DWT), 3,895 gross register tons (GRT) and 2,284 net register tons (NRT). The vessel was built with a first class dining saloon, first class smoking lounge, and a second class lounge. The total berths were 302, and her total passenger capacity was 358. She was driven by two Burmeister & Wain 1050-VF-90 diesel engines, which created approximately 7,100 horsepower (5,300 kW), with her service speed reaching 20.25 knots (37.50 km/h; 23.30 mph).

On 19 June 1941, the vessel was delivered to DFDS based at Esbjerg, Denmark. Due to the outbreak of World War II, engine components were not installed on the ship to avoid German acquisition. The hull was later towed to Copenhagen and laid up, where it remained for the duration of the war. On 5 November 1945, Kronprins Frederik was towed to Helsingør Shipyard and Machine Works for completion. On 11 March 1946, the vessel departed Helsingør for Copenhagen and began service on 25 May 1946.

=== Operations ===
Beginning on 26 May 1946 Kronprins Frederik began the Esbjerg - Harwich route. In September–October 1946, she was fitted with a DECCA Navigational System provided by the Metropolitan Vickers Electrical Export Co. Ltd., making it one of the first Danish ships to be outfitted with such radar equipment.

On 19 April 1953, the vessel arrived at Harwich, England and moored at Parkeston Quay, where a fire broke out in the passenger cabins. Firefighting efforts were made by the ship's crew; however, they were unable to control the fire. Local firefighting brigades later arrived to provide additional assistance and were still unable to control the fire. At 22:00, the ship began sinking, and at 05:00 during the following morning, she began listing on her starboard side. The oil tanks were also ruptured, which leaked into the surrounding water and caught fire. However, DFDS did not give up the ship, and following extensive salvage operations, the vessel was successfully refloated on 26 August 1953. It was brought into Harwich for temporary repairs and was later began the journey to Helsingør on 13 September 1953, for reconstruction. Five days later, the vessel arrived and returned to service on 23 April 1954. On 7 May of that year, Kronprins Frederik returned to service on the Esbjerg - Harwich route.

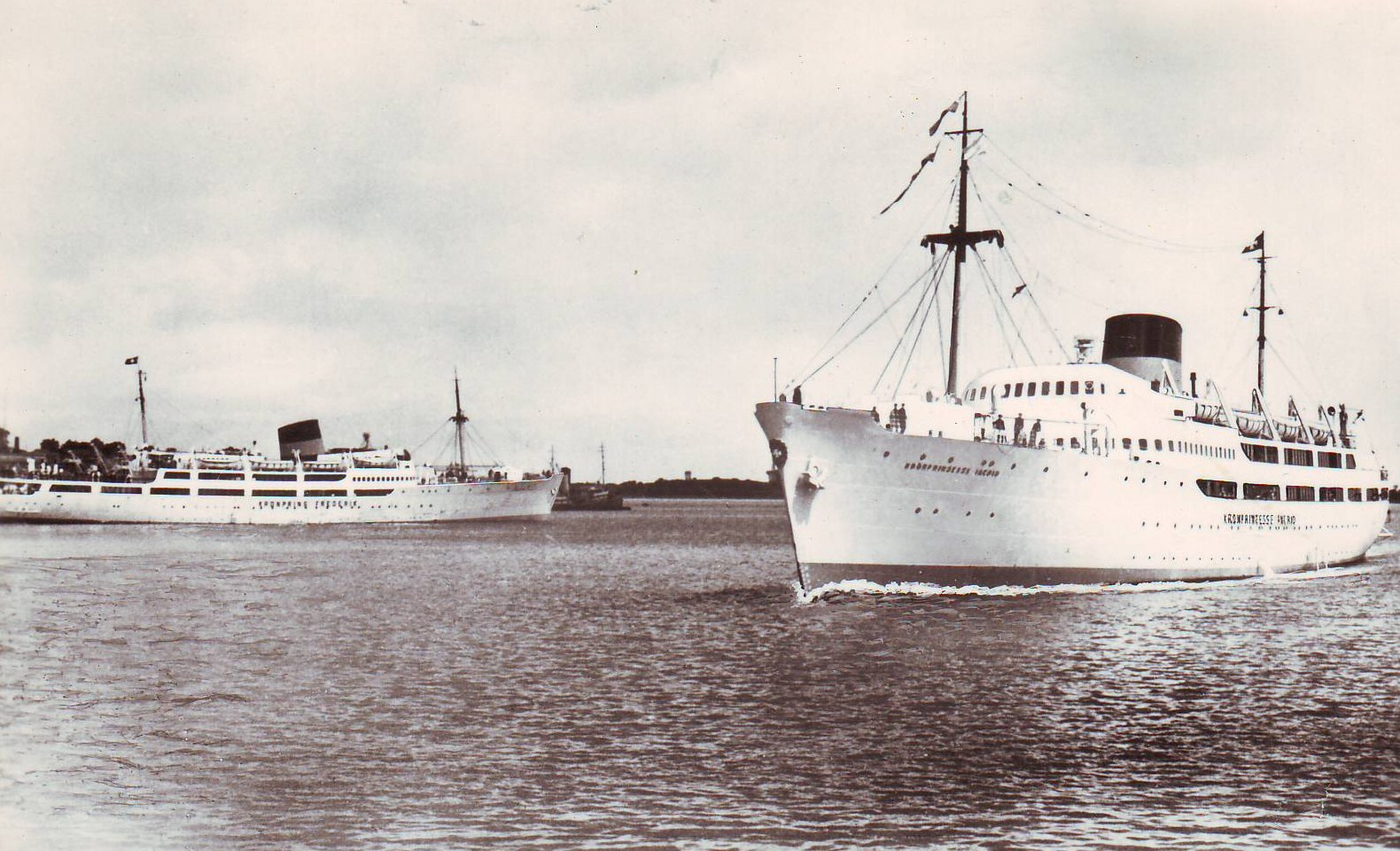
Kronprins Frederik (background) and Kronprinsess Ingrid (foreground), taken on 28 May 1949.

In 1964, the vessel ended the route and began the Esbjerg - Newcastle route on 26 June 1964. From 24 May 1965 until 1 June 1965, the vessel was chartered to the Royal Automobile Club based in Stockholm for a cruise between Stockholm, Leningrad, and Copenhagen. From 2 June 1965 until 8 June 1965, the vessel operated as a cruise between Copenhagen, Leith, Newcastle, and Esbjerg. From 10 June 1965, until 11 September 1965, the vessel operated on the Esbjerg - Newcastle route. On 15 January 1966, the vessel operated on the Copenhagen - Tórshavn - Klaksvík - Trangisvágur - Reykjavík route. From 10 June 1966 until 11 September 1966, the vessel operated on the Esbjerg - Newcastle route. In later switched to the Copenhagen - Tórshavn - Klaksvík - Trangisvágur - Reykjavík route of that month.

On 5 October 1970, calls at Reykjavík ceased, and the ship was rebuilt to provide single-class accommodation only in 1971. On 4 May 1971, it was registered to DFDS A/S. On 2 May 1972, it operated on the Esbjerg - Tórshavn - Trangisvágur route. During the summer seasons from 1972 until 1974, it operated on the Esbjerg - Newcastle - Tórshavn route. On 9 July 1974, Kronprins Frederik arrived in Esbjerg for the final voyage for DFDS. After 35 years of service under DFDS as Kronprins Frederik, she was laid up at Esbjerg and placed for sale. On 10 March 1976, the vessel was sold to Arab Navigation Company based in Suez, Egypt.

=== As Patra ===
On 16 March 1976, Kronprins Frederik was taken over by its new owners and was subsequently renamed to Patra.

On 24 December 1976, the engine room of Patra had caught fire while in the Red Sea about 50 miles (80 km) from Jeddah. She was en route to Suez from Jeddah, carrying 387 passengers and 94 crew members, most of whom were Muslims returning home from a pilgrimage to the cities of Mecca and Medina. The fire went uncontrolled, and passengers were ordered to jump into the sea where nearby vessels were waiting to pick them up. The Russian tanker Lenino picked up the ship's captain and 201 survivors from the wreckage and they were brought to Cairo. On the morning of 25 December, Patra sank while still aflame. The rescue operation also included half a dozen other ships from the United States, Greece, Germany, and Pakistan. Out of the passengers and crew onboard, 102 had perished.

The wreck lies on the seabed of the Red Sea at a depth of more than 450 metres (1,480 ft), located about 21°33′36″N 38°16′48″E.
