= Nyhavn 18 =

Building in Copenhagen, Denmark

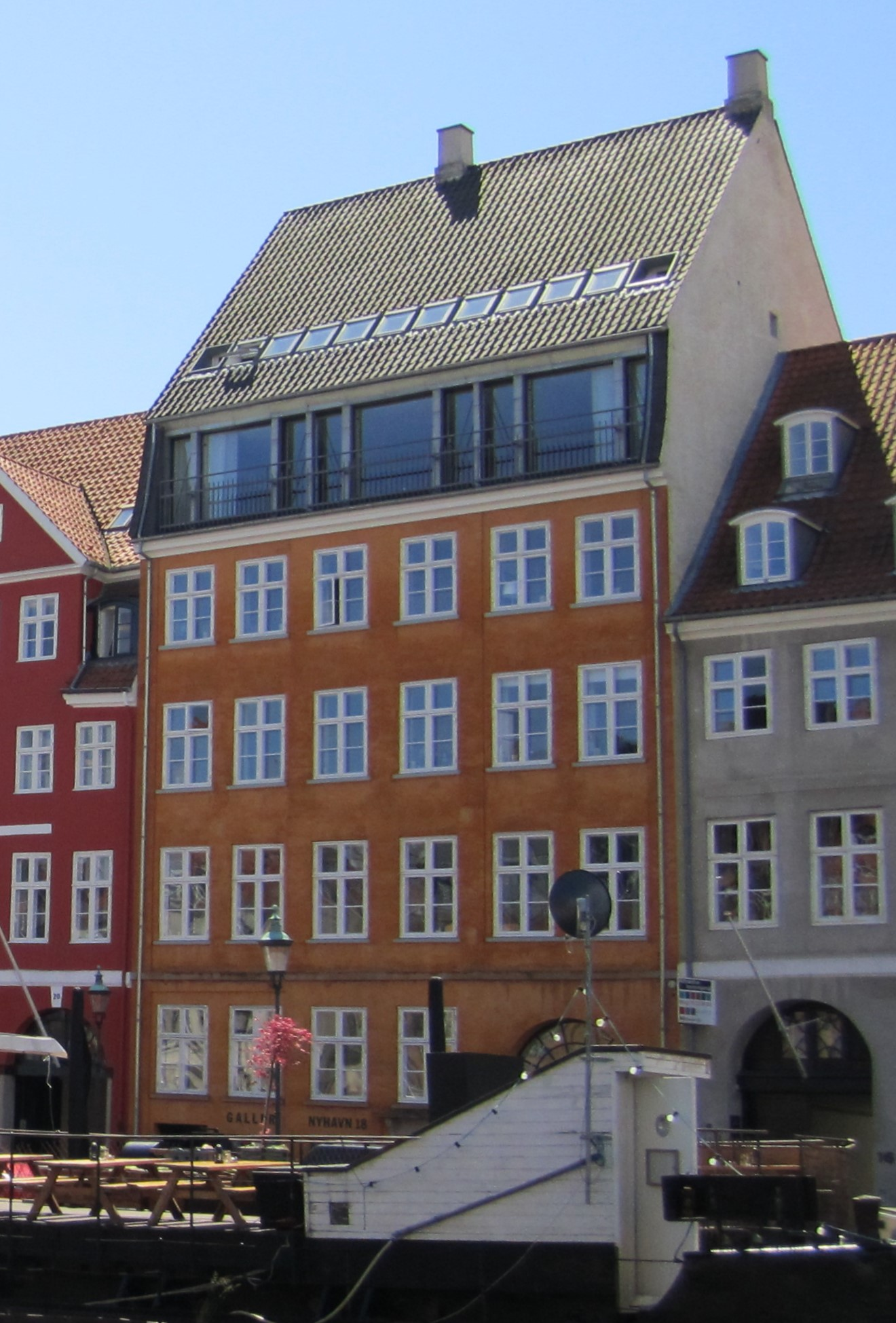
- Nyhavn 18 seen from the other side of the canal
- Interactive map of the Nyhavn 18 area

General information
- Location: Copenhagen, Denmark, Denmark
- Coordinates: 55°40′46.5″N 12°35′25″E
- Completed: c. 1770

Nyhavn 18 is a listed property overlooking the Nyhavn canal in central Copenhagen, Denmark. The writer Hans Christian Andersen lived on the first floor from 1871 until shortly before his death on 4 August 1875. The building has now been converted into residences for visiting guest artists and scientists.

== History ==
=== Bodenhoff family ===
Nyhavn 18 was built in c. 1770 for merchant and shipowner Andreas Bodenhoff and he lived there from when he was 62 years old as the building's first owner. It was then a three-storey building. The fourth storey was added in 1846.

=== 19th century ===
In 1800 (deed: 29 September), No. 287/288 was sold to ship captain Jep Nissen Kjær. In the new cadastre of 1806, the property was listed as No. 279 in St. Ann's East Quarter. It was still owned by Kjær at that time.

Jonathan Balling, who worked for the Royal Greenland Trade Department, lived in the building until his death in 1829. He was one of Hans Christian Andersen's first benefactors in Copenhagen. Andersem spent Christmas with Balling in 1822. The writer Andreas Nicolai de Saint-Aubain, who used the pseudonym Carl Bernhard, was a resident in the building from 1832 to 1865.

From October 1834, Betsy Brown (née Elphinstons) rented a five-room apartment in the building. She had just lost her husband Nicholas Vrown. She died in the building on 11 March 1838.

The property was later acquired by master mason Johan Carl Unger. In In 1846, he expanded the building with a fourth floor and a mansard roof. At the time of the 1850 census, he lived on the ground floor of the building with his wife Inger Kirstine (Stine) Unger (née Møller), their five children (aged five to 20) and one maid.

In the second half of the 1850s, Georg Emil Tuxen lived in one of the apartments. His son Nicolai Elias Tuxen (1857–1935) was born in the building.

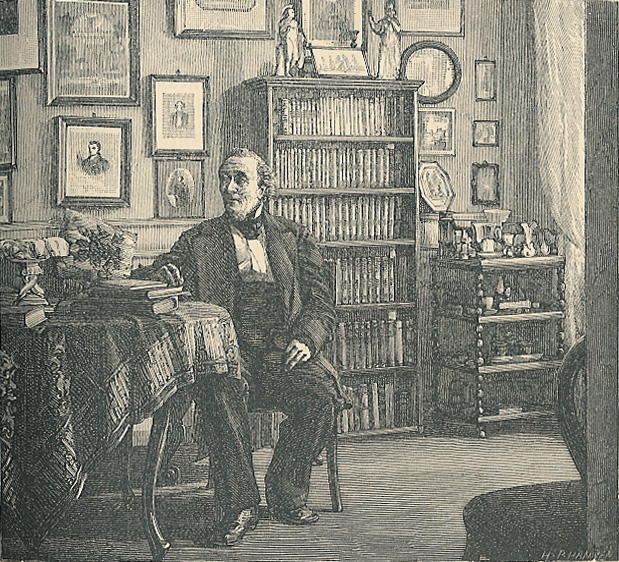
Hans Christian Andersen in his study at Nyhavn 18

Hans Christian Andersen was a lodger on the first floor from 23 October 1871, renting three rooms from Thora Hallager, a former photographer who now ran a boarding home at the address. He had also been her lodger at Lille Kongensgade 1. Crown Prince Frederik paid Andersen a visit in his home on 16 February 1873, and King Christian IX and Prince Valdemar paid him a visit on 23 February. On 1 July, Andersen moved in with the Melchior family in their summer residence Rolighed where he died on 4 August. Two of Andersen's friends, Matthias Weber and Erik Lassen, who both studied theology, lived on the second floor. Weber later became the village pastor in Haslev. Lassen became a house teacher at Bregetnved and later pastor in Fakse Ladepalds and Herfølge.

In Kraks Vejviser from 1873, Nyhavn 18 is listed with the following residents:

- Basement: Mr. Nielsen (haulier)
- Ground floor: Inger Kirstine Unger (née Møller, widow and owner of the property) and Ludvig Olsen (wholesaler)
- 1st floor: Hans Christian Andersen (etatsråd), Miss E. Ballin (pensioner)
- 2nd floor: W.E. Hansen (widow), P. Brockmeyer (office clerk), M. Weber (student) and E. Olsen (student)
- 3td floor: Frederik Christopher Krohn (professor)
- 4th floor: Erling Eckersberg (printmaker)

In 1876, Georg Brandes lived on the first floor. The painter Carl Locher was also among the residents of the building in 1875.

The property was home to 42 residents at the 1880 census. Inger Kirstine Unger (née Møller) still lived on the ground floor. Hans Frederik Thorvald Lindhard (1841–1916), a master mason, resided on the same floor with his wife Thora Vilhelmine Albertine Lindhard (née Møller, 1845–1908), their two children (aged one and six) and one maid. Clara and Caroline Ballin resided on the first floor with the lodgers Frederikke Koppel f Goldsmith and Frederikke Christiane Elisabeth Hohlenburg (née Schon), one maid and their visitor (relative) Adriene Ballin. Fransiska Sara Sophie Schouw (née Dons), widow of jurist Christian Michael Schouw (1798-), resided on the second floor with her daughters Sara Antoinette Schouw and Fanny Georgia Siegel (née Schouw), her granddaughter Sophie Liddy Siegel, her grandson Johannes Carl Christian Sigel and the relative Agnes Liddy Siegel née Løvel. Frederik Christoffer Krohn still resided on the third floor with his daughter Christine Cecilie Sophie Krohn, his foster daughter Juliane Emilie Købke and one maid. The painter Wenzel Tornøe (1844–1907) resided on the fourth floor with his wife Karen Elisabeth Torno, their two-year-old daughter and one maid. The printmaker Erling Carl Wilhelm Eckersberg was also residing on the fourth floor. Jens Hansen, a coachman, resided in the garret with his wife Christiane Hansen (née Nielsen), their infant daughter and five lodgers. Peter Jensen, a new haulier, resided in the basement with his wife Marie Jensen f Nielsen, their seven-year-old son, two maids and two lodgers.

Wenzel Tornøe moved in 1881. In 1882–83, Janus Laurentius Ridter (1854–1921) was among the residents.

=== 20th century ===
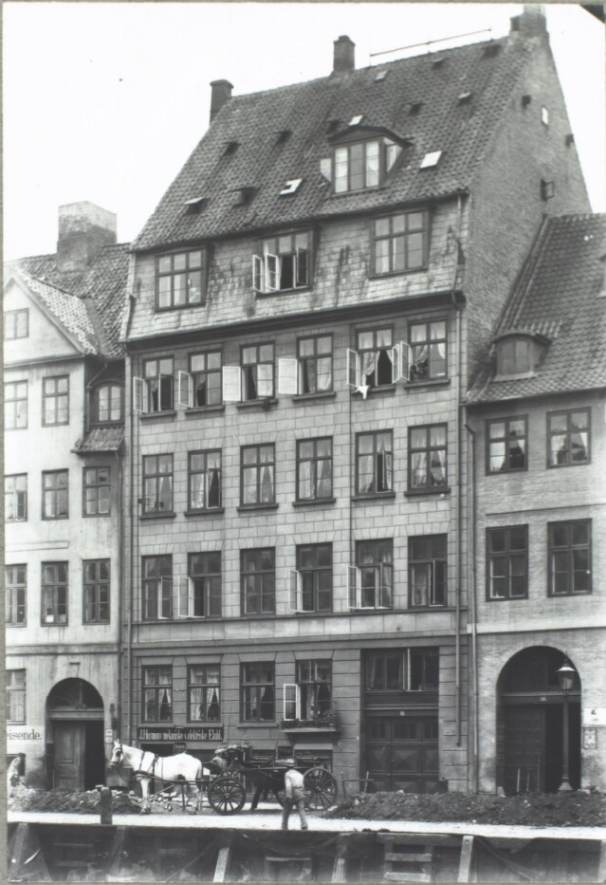
Hans Christian Andersen in his study at Nyhavn 18

The building was listed by the Danish Heritage Agency in the Danish national registry of protected buildings in 1932. In 1959, Bank of Denmark purchased the building. Erik Møller Architects were commissioned to adapt the building for use as residences for foreign artists and scientists. The renovation received an award from Copenhagen Municipality in 1973.

== Architecture ==
The building is six bays wide. Eril Møller Arkitekter replaced the mansard roof with dormers from the 1840s expansion with a recessed fifth floor with glazed frontage. The also restored the gate and placed a triangular lift on the rear side of the building.

== Today ==
The building contains seven residences. They are available to guest scientists and artists at Danish scientific and artistic institutions.
