= Andreas Hallander =

Danish master carpenter and architect

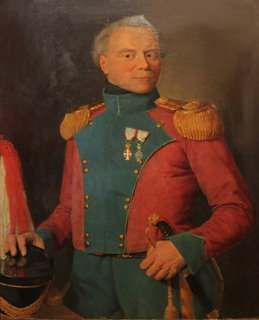
Andreas Hallander painted by Christian Albrecht Jensen, 1831.

Andreas Hallander (13 November 1755 – 3 April 1828) was a Danish master carpenter and architect who made a significant contribution to the city of Copenhagen. Together with the buildings of Johan Martin Quist, his classically styled apartment houses form part of the legacy of 19th-century Danish Golden Age architects who reconstructed areas of the old town which had been destroyed in the Great Fire of 1795.

== Early life and education ==
Hallander was the son of Jens Nielsen Hallander, a miller. Trained as a carpenter, he studied architecture at the Royal Danish Academy of Fine Arts under the influential C.F. Harsdorff, winning the large silver medal in 1780.

== Career ==
His buildings are in the neoclassical style favoured by Harsdorff. He was one of the small group of Harsdorff's students from the Academy who were largely responsible for the rebuilding of Copenhagen after the fires.

These builders formed a close-knit group, reinforced by their membership of the civil guard and fire corps. They married each other's daughters and widows and acted as godfathers at christenings. Huge fortunes were made as they bought plots of land, built them up and sold them again. Hallander was an enormously productive speculator and builder. He was one of the main contributors to the classical architecture of Copenhagen, predominant in large sections of the city centre. Most of his buildings are now listed.

== Personal life ==
He married Emilie Tønnesen, daughter of skipper Jan Jansen Tønnesen and Bodil Hansdatter. He is buried in Assistens Cemetery.

== Selected works ==
- Bredgade 33, Copenhagen (1794)

== See also ==
- Ernst Burmeister
