= List of shipwrecks in August 1888 =

The list of shipwrecks in August 1888 includes ships sunk, foundered, grounded, or otherwise lost during August 1888.

== 1 August ==
List of shipwrecks: 1 August 1888
Ship	State	Description
John Cowan	United States	The fishing tug caught fire, burned and sank in Platte River Bay in Lake Michigan.

== 3 August ==
List of shipwrecks: 3 August 1888
Ship	State	Description
Fleetwing	United States	The whaler, a bark, was wrecked on a reef 1 nautical mile (1.9 km; 1.2 mi) northeast of Point Barrow in the District of Alaska during a gale. Her entire crew of 37 survived. Her crew was rescued by the revenue cutter USRC Bear ( United States Revenue-Marine).
Jane Grey	United States	The schooner was wrecked between Cape Smythe and Point Barrow during a gale. Her crew were rescued by the revenue cutter USRC Bear ( United States Revenue-Marine).
Ino	United States	The schooner was wrecked between Cape Smythe and Point Barrow. Her crew were rescued by the revenue cutter USRC Bear ( United States Revenue-Marine).
Mary and Susan	United States	The whaler, a bark, was wrecked on a reef 4 nautical miles (7.4 km; 4.6 mi) south of Point Barrow during a gale. Her crew were rescued by the revenue cutter USRC Bear ( United States Revenue-Marine).
Young Phenix, or Young Phoenix	United States	The whaler, a bark, was crushed against the shore by ice and lost near Point Barrow. Her 38 crew survived. Her crew was rescued by the revenue cutter USRC Bear ( United States Revenue-Marine).

== 4 August ==
List of shipwrecks: 4 August 1888
Ship	State	Description
Seagull	United Kingdom	The Lowestoft lugger sank during a gale off Scarborough with the loss of all nine crew.

== 6 August ==
List of shipwrecks: 6 August 1888
Ship	State	Description
Amphitrite	United Kingdom	The ship sprang a leak and sank in the North Sea 140 nautical miles (260 km) north east by north of Spurn Head, Yorkshire. Her crew were rescued by Pandora (United Kingdom). Amphitrite was on a voyage from Newcastle upon Tyne, Northumberland to "Neile".
Cambrian, and Etoile du Sud	United Kingdom; France	The barques collided at Valparaíso, Chile. Both vessels sank; Cambrian with the loss of fifteen of the seventeen people on board, Etoile du Sud with the loss of seven of her eleven crew.
Glentilt	United Kingdom	The ship collided with a coaster at Valparaíso and was severely damaged. She was beached. Her crew survived.
Success	United States	The ship was wrecked at Valparaíso. Her crew were rescued.
Four unnamed vessels	Flags unknown	The ships were wrecked at Valparaíso.

== 7 August ==
List of shipwrecks: 7 August 1888
Ship	State	Description
City of Hamburg	United Kingdom	The steamship ran ashore at Bolt Head, Devon and was abandoned. Six of her 22 crew reached land in a boat. Nine in another boat were towed in to Salcombe by the Salcombe Lifeboat. Seven in a third boat were reported missing. City of Hamburg was on a voyage from Porto, Portugal to Southampton, Hampshire.

== 8 August ==
List of shipwrecks: 8 August 1888
Ship	State	Description
Ino	United States	The schooner dragged her anchor and was wrecked at Cape Smyth (71°17′35″N 156°47′15″W) near Point Barrow in the District of Alaska during a gale. Her crew were rescued by the revenue cutter USRC Bear ( United States Revenue-Marine).
Redewater	United Kingdom	The steamship was driven ashore west of Dover, Kent. She was refloated with assistance.

== 9 August ==
List of shipwrecks: 9 August 1888
Ship	State	Description
Gomes V	Portugal	The steamship was driven ashore on Great Ganilly, Isles of Scilly, United Kingdom. All on board were rescued. She was on a voyage from Cardiff, Glamorgan, United Kingdom to Porto. She was declared a total loss.
Mosca	Italy	The ship departed from Pensacola, Florida, United States for Sharpness, Gloucestershire, United Kingdom. No further trace, reported missing.
Victoria	United Kingdom	The tug struck a sunken rock and was wrecked off Cromer, Norfolk. All on board were rescued. She was on a voyage from Cromer to Great Yarmouth or vice versa.

== 10 August ==
List of shipwrecks: 10 August 1888
Ship	State	Description
Warren	United States	The steamship was blown ashore in a gale at Baton Rouge, Louisiana. One crewman was killed in a fall.

== 12 August ==
List of shipwrecks: 12 August 1888
Ship	State	Description
Bosphorus	United Kingdom	The steamship collided with the barque Abbey Town (United Kingdom) and sank in the English Channel off Start Point, Devon. Her 27 crew were rescued by Abbey Town. Bosphorus was on a voyage from Alexandria, Egypt to London.
Brownrigg, and Etna	United Kingdom	The full-rigged ship Brownrigg collided with the steamship Etna off the coast of Norfolk. Both vessels were severely damaged. Brownrigg was under tow of the tug Rose (United Kingdom) on a voyage from Hull, Yorkshire to Cardiff, Glamorgan. She was beached at Winterton-on-Sea with the assistance of Rose and two other tugs. She was consequently condemned. Etna was on a voyage from London to Newcastle upon Tyne, Northumberland. She was beached at Sea Palling but was refloated and taken in to Great Yarmouth.
Prosperity	United Kingdom	The schooner was driven ashore at Ballygunton Point. She was on a voyage from Irvine, Ayrshire to "Kirkal".

== 14 August ==
List of shipwrecks: 14 August 1888
Ship	State	Description
Geiser, and Thingvalla	Denmark	The steamship Thingvalla ran into the steamship Geiser in the Atlantic Ocean 30 nautical miles (56 km) south of Cape Sable Island, Nova Scotia, Canada. Geiser was cut in two and sank with the loss of 105 of the 136 people on board. Survivors were rescued by Wieland (Germany) Geiser was on a voyage from New York, United States to a European port. Thingvalla was severely damaged. Her 455 passengers were taken off by Wieland. Thingvalla put in to Halifax, Nova Scotia.
Lancaster	United Kingdom	The steamship ran aground on the Owers Sandbank, in the English Channel off the coast of Sussex. She was later refloated and towed in to Southampton, Hampshire.
Queen of the Bay	United Kingdom	The paddle steamer was holed by the anchor of a dredger at Cardiff. Her passengers were transferred to Earl of Bute (United Kingdom) and she settled on the bottom. The ship was refloated the same day.

== 15 August ==
List of shipwrecks: 15 August 1888
Ship	State	Description
Great Western	United Kingdom	The paddle steamer ran aground at Weymouth, Dorset. She was on a voyage from the Channel Islands to Weymouth.

== 20 August ==
List of shipwrecks: 20 August 1888
Ship	State	Description
Ernest	United Kingdom	The 73.2-foot (22.3 m) 62-ton schooner went aground on rocks when entering the harbour at Cemaes. The ship was refloated, repaired, and returned to service.

== 21 August ==
List of shipwrecks: 21 August 1888
Ship	State	Description
Gylfe	United Kingdom	The barque was abandoned in the Atlantic Ocean by twelve of her fifteen crew. They were rescued by the steamship Persian Monarch (United Kingdom). Gylfe was on a voyage from Quebec City, Canada to Greenock, Renfrewshire. She was taken in to Queenstown, County Cork in a waterlogged condition on 6 September.

== 22 August ==
List of shipwrecks: 22 August 1888
Ship	State	Description
City of Chester	United States	A painting of SS City of Chester (right) sinking after colliding with RMS Oceanic (left). The passenger ship was in collision with RMS Oceanic (United Kingdom) in fog in San Francisco Bay and sank with the loss of sixteen lives. She was on a voyage from San Francisco to Eureka, California
Gov. Jackson	United States	The barge, under tow of Raleigh (United States), sank off Winter Quarter Shoal. One crewman was lost, survivors were rescued by Raleigh.

== 23 August ==
List of shipwrecks: 23 August 1888
Ship	State	Description
Eliza	United Kingdom	The ketch went ashore on the western end of the beach at Pentewan, Cornwall; the crew were saved.

== 24 August ==
List of shipwrecks: 24 August 1888
Ship	State	Description
South Moor	United Kingdom	The steamship collided with the steamship Winston and sank in the River Thames at Limehouse, Middlesex. South Moor was on a voyage from Newcastle upon Tyne, Northumberland to London.

== 25 August ==
List of shipwrecks: 25 August 1888
Ship	State	Description
Albatross	United Kingdom	The ship departed from Belize City, British Guiana for Goole, Yorkshire. No further trace, reported overdue.
Bratsberg	United Kingdom	The steamship struck a rock off Cape Chatte, Quebec, Canada and then ran aground at Saint-Félicien, Quebec. Three of the twenty people abandoned ship the next day. Fifteen of the remaining seventeen were lost on 27 August. The ship began to break up, and they took to a boat, which capsized. Bratsberg was later refloated and taken in to Quebec City in a severely damaged condition.

== 27 August ==
List of shipwrecks: 27 August 1888
Ship	State	Description
Vanderbilt	United States	The schooner was wrecked in a severe storm with heavy rain and high seas at Pirate Cove (55°21′40″N 160°21′25″W) in the District of Alaska. Her crew of 27 survived.

== 29 August ==
List of shipwrecks: 29 August 1888
Ship	State	Description
Alexandria	United Kingdom	The tug caught fire and sank in the Bristol Channel. Her crew survived.
Dinapore	United Kingdom	The barque was severely damaged by fire at Londonderry.

== 30 August ==
List of shipwrecks: 30 August 1888
Ship	State	Description
C. Boschetti	Italy	The barque was driven ashore and wrecked at Port Elizabeth, Cape Colony. Her twelve crew were rescued. She was on a voyage from Rangoon, Burma to Greenwich, Kent, United Kingdom.
Dorothea	Germany	The brig was driven ashore and wrecked at Port Elizabeth. Her crew were rescued by rocket apparatus and a boat.
Drie Emmas	Belgium	The barque was driven ashore and wrecked at Port Elizabeth.
Elizabeth Stevens	United Kingdom	The barquentine was driven ashore and wrecked at Port Elizabeth. Her crew were rescued.
Eugénie	Flag unknown	The schooner collided with the full-rigged ship Erne (United Kingdom) and sank off the Blackwater Lightship ( Trinity House) with the loss of two of her five crew. Survivors were rescued by Erne.
Jane Harvey	Denmark	The barque was driven ashore and wrecked at Port Elizabeth.
Lada	Austria-Hungary	The barque was driven ashore and wrecked at Port Elizabeth.
Natal	Sweden	The schooner was driven ashore and wrecked at Port Elizabeth. Her crew were rescued.
Rosebud	United Kingdom	The schooner was driven ashore and wrecked in Mossel Bay. All on board were rescued.
Wolseley	United Kingdom	The barque was driven into the barque Drie Emmas (Belgium), came ashore and was wrecked at Port Elizabeth with the loss of a crew member. There were about eleven survivors, who were rescued by rocket apparatus and the Port Elizabeth Lifeboat.

== 31 August ==
List of shipwrecks: 31 August 1888
Ship	State	Description
Andreas Rus	Flag unknown	The ship was wrecked at Port Elizabeth, Cape Colony. Her crew were rescued.
Carin	Sweden	The brigantine ran aground in the River Ouse. She was on a voyage from Härnösand to Goole, Yorkshire, United Kingdom. She was refloated the next day and completed her voyage.
C. Boschetto	Flag unknown	The ship was wrecked at Port Elizabeth with some loss of life.
Pelham	United Kingdom	The steamship foundered off Holyhead, Anglesey. Her crew were rescued by the fishing trawler Gipsy Queen (United Kingdom).
Snaresbrook	United Kingdom	The steamship collided with the steamship Cairo (United Kingdom) and sank 4 nautical miles (7.4 km) east of Tarifa, Spain. Ten of her crew were rescued by Cairo.
Seven unnamed vessels	Flags unknown	The ships were wrecked at Port Elizabeth with the loss of at least three lives.

== Unknown date ==
List of shipwrecks: Unknown date in August 1888
Ship	State	Description
Active	United Kingdom	The schooner foundered 7 nautical miles (13 km) off Sanda Island, Argyllshire. Her crew were rescued.
Alicia	Spain	The steamship ran aground in the River Lee.
Angers	United Kingdom	The steamship ran aground on the Cockburn Reef, in the Torres Strait. She was later refloated and resumed her voyage.
Ansgaar	Denmark	The barque was driven ashore on the south coast of Amack. She was later refloated with assistance.
Auckland Castle	United Kingdom	The steamship ran aground at Sandhamn, Sweden.
Bentinck	United Kingdom	The steamship foundered in the Baltic Sea. Her crew were rescued.
Christiane	Norway	The barque was driven ashore at Gothenburg, Sweden. She was on a voyage from South Shields, County Durham, United Kingdom to Kronstadt, Russia. She was a total loss.
Christiansund	Denmark	The steamship collided with the steamship Haakon Jarl (Norway) and was severely damaged. Christiansund put in to Bergen, Norway.
City of Philadelphia	United States	The ship was driven ashore. She was on a voyage from Yloilo, Spanish East Indies to New York. She was refloated.
Countess of Derby	United Kingdom	The ship caught fire at Montevideo, Uruguay. The fire was extinguished.
Countess of Devon	United Kingdom	The barque caught fire at Montevideo. The fire was extinguished.
Cuxhaven	Germany	The steamship ran aground in the River Ouse. She was on a voyage from Goole, Yorkshire, United Kingdom to Hamburg.
Diana	United Kingdom	The steamship ran aground at Kronstadt. She was refloated with assistance.
Domira	United Kingdom	The steamship was driven ashore on Ven, Sweden. She was on a voyage from Newcastle upon Tyne, Northumberland to Kronstadt. She was refloated.
Drie Zusters	Germany	The kuff put in to Arendal, Norway in a waterlogged condition. She was on a voyage from Drammen, Norway to Altona.
Emily	Norway	The barque was abandoned in the Atlantic Ocean. Her crew were rescued by the brig Adela (United Kingdom) Emily was on a voyage from Sheet Harbour, Nova Scotia, Canada to Pauillac, Gironde, France.
Escalono	United Kingdom	The steamship was driven ashore at Matane, Quebec, Canada. She was on a voyage from Newcastle upon Tyne to Montreal, Quebec. She was refloated with the assistance of a tug.
Ernest	United Kingdom	The schooner was driven ashore at Cemaes, Anglesey. She was on a voyage from Briton Ferry, Glamorgan to Cemaes.
E. W. Gale	United Kingdom	The brigantine was driven ashore. She was refloated and towed in to Saint John, New Brunswick, Canada in a waterlogged condition.
Florence	United Kingdom	The steamship ran aground at Gallipoli, Ottoman Empire. She was on a voyage from Odesa, Russia to Rotterdam, South Holland, Netherlands.
Gate City	United States	The steamship was driven ashore at Boston, Massachusetts. She was later refloated.
Gefle	Germany	The steamship was driven ashore on Heligoland. She was on a voyage from Lerwick, Shetland Islands, United Kingdom to Hamburg.
Général Chanzy	France	The barque ran aground on the Caloot Bank, in the North Sea off the coast of Zeeland, Netherlands. She was on a voyage from Antwerp, Belgium to Havre de Grâce, Seine-Inférieure. She was later refloated and taken in to Vlissingen, Zeeland.
General Trine	Norway	The schooner foundered in the Atlantic Ocean 130 nautical miles (240 km) west of the Isles of Scilly, United Kingdom. Her crew were rescued by a Norwegian barque.
Giam Paolo	Italy	The steamship was wrecked on the Acciteira Reef, off Tarifa, Spain.
Gladys	United Kingdom	The steamship ran aground in the Elbe. She was on a voyage from Odesa to Hamburg.
Hjalmar	Norway	The ship ran aground in the Drogden. She was on a voyage from Kotka, Grand Duchy of Finland to Cherbourg, Manche, France.
Itchen	United Kingdom	The steamship was driven ashore near Hartland Point, Devon. She was a total loss.
Izvor	Austria-Hungary	The barque was abandoned in the Atlantic Ocean before 12 August. Her crew were rescued. She was on a voyage from Marseille, Bouches-du-Rhône, France to Buenos Aires, Argentina.
Jane	United Kingdom	The ship was wrecked in Plettenburg Bay.
Johan Theodor	Netherlands	The barque was driven ashore at Ternate, Netherlands East Indies. She was refloated and taken in to Ternate.
Jules Chagot	France	The steamship ran aground at Saint-Nazaire, Ille-et-Vilaine. She was on a voyage from Cardiff, Glamorgan to Saint-Nazaire. She was refloated and beached.
Juliane	Norway	The schooner collided with another vessel and sank off Skagen, Denmark. She was on a voyage from Charlestown, Cornwall, United Kingdom to Kallundborg, Denmark.
Kostroma, and Mars	Imperial Russian Navy; Austria-Hungary	The troopship Kostroma collided with the steamship Mars near Constantinople, Ottoman Empire. Both vessels were severely damaged. Mars was beached near Yenikale.
Liberta	Norway	The steamship ran aground and was wrecked at White Island, Nova Scotia. All on board were rescued. She was on a voyage from New York, United States to Stettin, Germany.
Lizzie Stewart	United Kingdom	The ship was driven ashore at Malmö, Sweden. She was refloated with assistance.
Lord Warwick	United Kingdom	The steamship ran aground in Lough Foyle.
Lydia	Russia	The schooner ran aground on the Middelgrund, in the Baltic Sea. She was on a voyage from Oulu, Grand Duchy of Finland to Copenhagen, Denmark.
Maria	Netherlands	The schooner foundered at Bandholm, Denmark. Her crew were rescued. She was on a voyage from Bandholm to Bordeaux, Gironde.
Mobile	Flag unknown	The steamship was driven ashore on Zanzibar. She was later refloated.
Nora	Sweden	The steamship was driven ashore. She was refloated and taken in to Neder Kalix in a leaky condition.
Ormelie	Norway	The barque collided with the steamship Kovno (United Kingdom) and was severely damaged. Ormelie was on a voyage from Sundsvall, Sweden to London, United Kingdom. She was towed in to Helsingør, Denmark in a waterlogged condition.
Petersburg	Germany)	The steamship collided with the steamship Free Lance (United Kingdom) at Swinemünde and was beached. Petersburg was on a voyage from Königsberg to Stettin.
Phœnix	United Kingdom	The steamship ran aground in the Yenisei between 23 and 30 August. She was later refloated.
Princess	United Kingdom	The steamship foundered off Gotska Sandön, Sweden before 9 August. Her crew were rescued.
Sesanne	United Kingdom	The brigantine ran aground on the Whiting Sand, in the North Sea off the coast of Suffolk. She was refloated but consequently sank. Her crew were rescued.
Soneck	Germany	The steamship ran aground. She was on a voyage from Jakobstadt, Grand Duchy of Finland to Barcelona, Spain. She was later refloated and taken in to Gävle, Sweden in a leaky condition.
Sunlight	United Kingdom	The steamship collided with a hopper barge in the River Mersey. She was beached between Egremont and New Brighton, Cheshire. She was on a voyage from Bristol, Gloucestershire to Liverpool, Lancashire.
Terrible	United Kingdom	The tugboat foundered off Newbiggin-by-the-Sea, Northumberland. Her crew survived.
Valkyrien	Norway	The barque was driven ashore and severely damaged at "Stroque". She was on a voyage from Pernambuco, Brazil to "Meesoro".
Westoe	United Kingdom	The steamship ran aground in the Danube 38 nautical miles (70 km) from its mouth.
William Richards	United Kingdom	The ship was abandoned in the Atlantic Ocean before 25 August.
Zarate	United Kingdom	The steamship ran aground at Buenos Aires. She was later refloated and towed in to La Boca, Argentina.
Zelica	United Kingdom	The brigantine was wrecked at Natal, Brazil. Her crew were rescued. She was on a voyage from Bahia, Brazil to Boston, Massachusetts.
Unnamed	Russia	The lighter sank at Kronstadt.
