= Amerikabåt =

Term for migrant ship

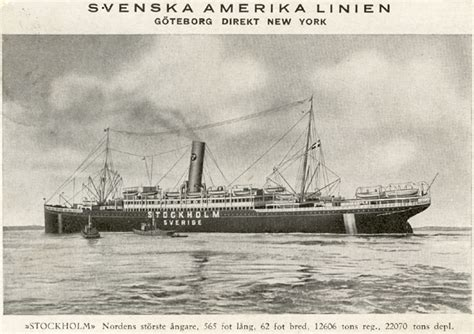

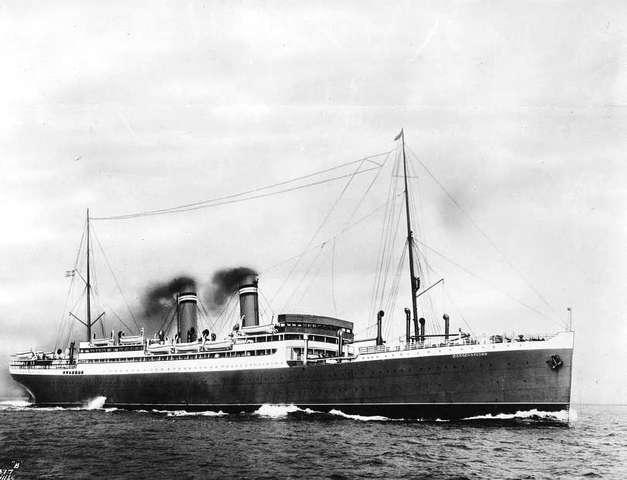
SS Bergensfjord, a typical 20th century Amerikabåt

Amerikabåt (plural Amerikabåten, lit. transl. America boat) were the ships that carried emigrants from Scandinavian countries such as Norway and Sweden to the United States. Amerikabåten were technically simply a subtype of transatlantic ship but their role in the emigrant exodus gave them additional cultural significance. Songs, such as "Amerikabåten", written by Matias Orheim in 1906, about the emigrants, included lyrical references to these ships.

Swedish American Line (1914-1984) was a cargo and passenger line that might be referred to as "amerikabåt" and whose ships operated between Gothenburg and New York.

== See also ==
- Thingvalla Line (1879-1898), renamed Scandinavian America Line (1898-1935), Danish line to America
  - Rescue of the SS Danmark (1889)
  - SS Norge (1881-1904)
- Norwegian America Line (1910-1995)
