= SS Thingvalla (1874) =

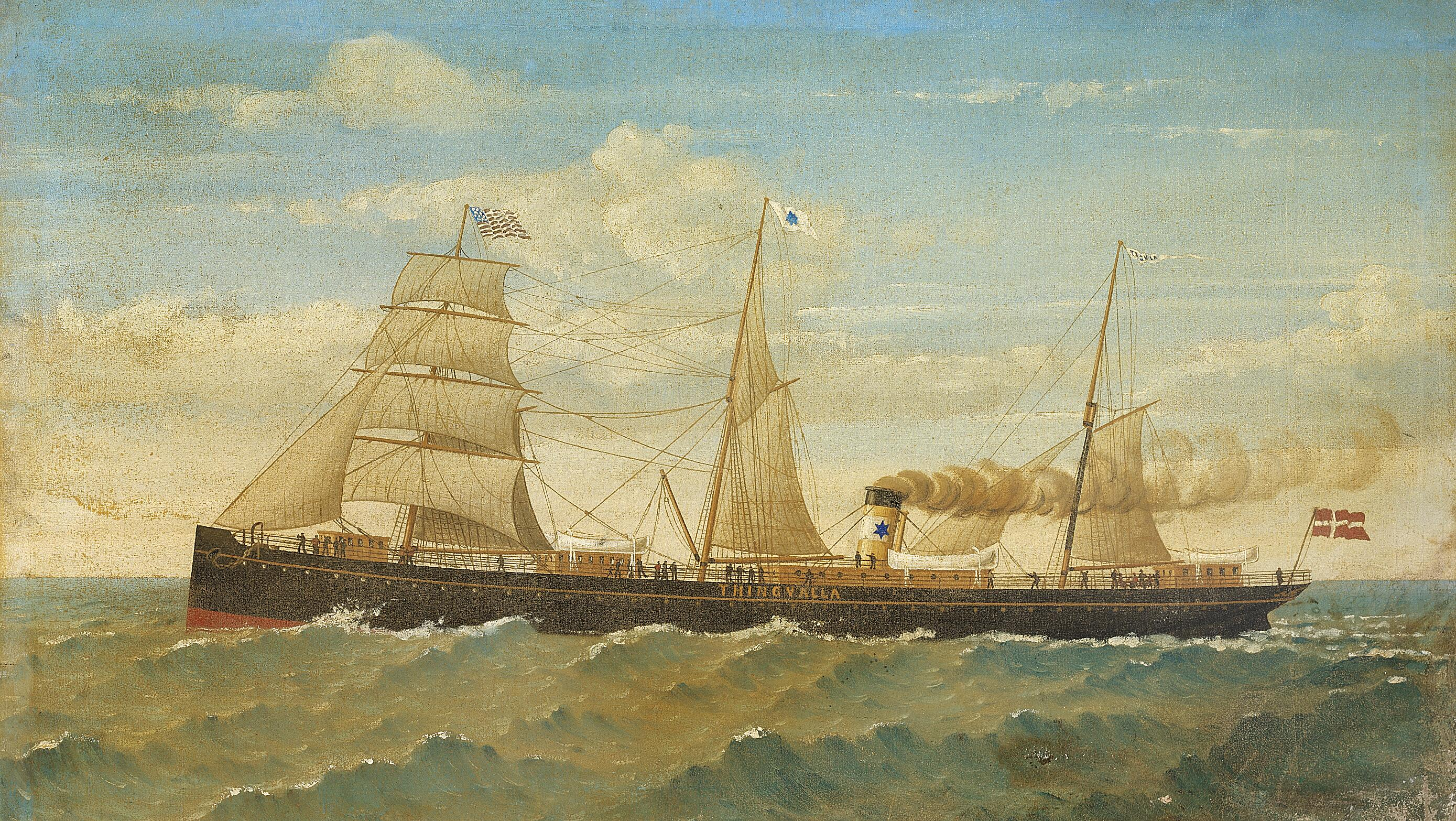

History
- Name: (1874–1900) Thingvalla; (1900–1903) Aslaug
- Namesake: Þingvellir
- Owner: (1874–1879) A/S Seil- og Dampskibsselskabet; (1879–1898) Thingvalla Line; (1898–1900) Scandinavian America Line; (1900–1903) A/S Dampskibsselskabet Aslaug
- Port of registry: (1874–1900) Copenhagen, Denmark; (1900–1903) Kristiania, Norway
- Ordered: 4 April 1873
- Builder: Burmeister & Wain
- Yard number: 86
- Launched: 25 October 1873
- Completed: 20 June 1874
- Acquired: 20 June 1874
- Maiden voyage: 1874
- In service: 20 June 1874
- Out of service: November 1903
- Fate: Scrapped in 1903

General characteristics
- Type: Passenger ship
- Tonnage: 2,524 GRT
- Length: 91.9 m (301 ft 6 in)
- Beam: 11.4 m (37 ft 5 in)
- Depth: 6.6 m (21 ft 8 in)
- Decks: 3
- Installed power: One 2 cyl. compound steam engine
- Propulsion: One screw
- Sail plan: Stettin - Copenhagen - Kristiania - Kristiansand - New York
- Speed: 10 knots (19 km/h; 12 mph)
- Capacity: Accommodation for 1,000 passengers (50 in First class, 50 in Second class, 900 in Steerage)
- Notes: Three masts and a single funnel

SS Thingvalla was a Danish transatlantic passenger ship that is best known for sinking SS Geiser after colliding with her on 14 August 1888 in the Atlantic Ocean 30 nautical miles (56 km) south of Cape Sable Island, Nova Scotia, Canada, with the loss of 105 lives.

== Construction ==
Thingvalla was built at the Burmeister & Wain shipyard in Copenhagen, Denmark and launched on 25 October 1873 before being completed on 20 June 1874. The ship was 91.9 metres (301 ft 6 in) long, had a beam of 11.4 metres (37 ft 5 in) and a depth of 6.6 metres (21 ft 8 in). She was assessed at 2,524 gross register tons (GRT) and had one two-cylinder compound steam engine driving a single screw propeller that could achieve a speed of 10 knots (19 km/h; 12 mph). The ship had accommodation for 1,000 passengers including 50 in First class, 50 in Second class, and 900 in Steerage. Thingvalla was built with six cemented bulkheads and a partial double bottom.

== Early career ==
Thingvalla began her career sailing to the East Indies until 30 March 1879, when the ship was acquired by the Thingvalla Line and assigned the transatlantic route from Stettin to New York with stopovers in Kristiania and Kristiansand. On 17 February 1880, Thingvalla rescued the 27 crew of the American ship Alexander Marshall as they had to abandon the ship after it had sprung a leak and sank in the Atlantic Ocean. The survivors were landed at Yarmouth, Isle of Wight on 23 February but Alexander Marshall's cargo of petroleum and oil was lost. Thingvalla would go on to suffer some mishaps at sea as well, the first of these occurred in May 1880 when Thingvalla lost her propeller while sailing to New York. The ship arrived in Boston on 7 May where the ship was repaired and her passengers continued on to New York by train. Thingvalla also struck an underwater rock while sailing in a snowstorm and slowly took on water but managed to arrive in Kristiansand on 31 January 1881 under her own power. Thingvalla ran aground on 27 April 1885 at 6 am on Hovedøya in Kristiania and was refloated three days later after all her cargo had been removed.

=== Sinking of SS Geiser ===
Thingvalla was on a regular journey to New York with 450 passengers aboard under the command of Captain Albers, when she encountered rain and fog on 14 August 1888 as the ship was sailing along the coast of Newfoundland, south of Sable Island. Thingvalla was still sailing at full speed, when she suddenly spotted SS Geiser, which was also operated by the Thingvalla Line and heading for Copenhagen from New York. Although Thingvalla ordered her engines full astern, the ships were too close to each other to avoid a collision and at 3.35 am, Thingvalla struck Geiser amidships on her starboard side and broke the ship in half, sinking her in five minutes and killing 105 people. After the collision, Thingvalla sailed away from the wrecksite as to not accidentally drag any survivors into her propellers and waited for an hour before she launched three of her own lifeboats to go in search of survivors from the ship they had just sunk. In the end only 31 survivors were rescued from the icy water while Thingvalla suffered no fatalities in the disaster. The ship itself however, was severely damaged as the bow had been crushed in about 9 metres (29 ft 6 in) and the damage came within 5 cm (2.0 in) of the first watertight bulkhead, which had to be strengthened by the crew by the use of wooden logs so the ship would not founder. That afternoon, the German ocean liner SS Wieland stumbled upon the damaged Thingvalla and it was decided that Wieland would take on all 450 passengers from Thingvalla and the 31 survivors from Geiser and land them at New York while Thingvalla would be towed by the fishing vessel Capio to Halifax for repairs. As the bulkhead was weakened in the collision and would not hold the sea at bay when sailing too fast, it was decided that the Thingvalla would be towed stern first to Halifax, where she arrived on 16 August.

== Later career and end ==
In December 1889, Thingvalla's third mate was washed overboard during an Atlantic storm as she was travelling back to Kristiania and on 19 May 1890 at 5.15, Thingvalla collided head-on with a 6-metre (20 ft)-high and 30-metre (98 ft)-long iceberg while going 5 knots (9.3 km/h; 5.8 mph) in foggy conditions. The damage to the bow was boarded up and secured with quick setting concrete before the ship made it safely to New York. Thingvalla's screw and hull were damaged by ice again on 22 February 1893 as she was sailing through the Kristianiafjord. Thingvalla's owner Thingvalla Line was bought by the Scandinavian America Line on 10 October 1898 and thus also owned the Thingvalla Line's fleet which included Thingvalla, Norge, Hekla and Island. Thingvalla continued sailing her usual route to New York under the new company from 9 November 1898 until 23 June 1900 as she was sold again that year to the Norwegian company A/S Dampskibsselskabet Aslaug for £7,000. The Thingvalla was renamed to Aslaug, and plans were made in 1903 to convert the ship into a whale oil factory until she ran aground on 18 September 1903 as she left Narvik for Hartlepool with a cargo of iron ore. The ship was refloated and brought to Trondheim instead for repairs. Aslaug was sold for scrapping that same year and brought to Rotterdam, where she arrived on 26 November 1903 for scrapping later that year.
