= SS Arawa =

Scottish ocean liner

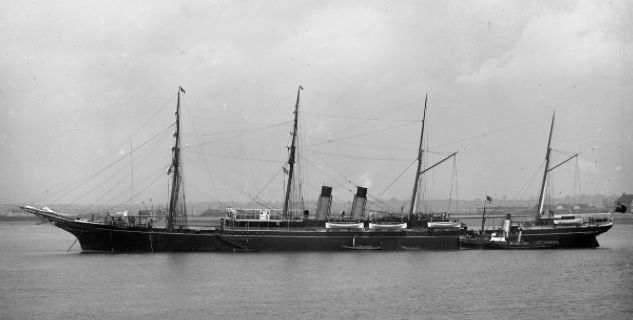
- A side profile of Arawa

History

United Kingdom
- Name: Arawa (1884-1895, 1898-1900); Colon (1895-1898); Lake Megantic (1900-1905); Port Henderson (1905-1912); Anapo or Arrapo (1912-1913); Porto Said (1913-1915)
- Owner: Shaw, Savill & Albion Line
- Port of registry: Glasgow
- Route: England-Oceania
- Builder: William Denny & Bros, Dumbarton
- Yard number: 282
- Launched: 25 June 1884
- Completed: 17 October 1884
- Maiden voyage: November 1884
- Out of service: 10 December 1915
- Fate: Torpedoed and sunk by U-39, 10 December 1915; 32°46′N 23°40′E

General characteristics
- Type: Ocean liner
- Tonnage: 5,026 GRT; 3,267 NRT
- Length: 420ft (128m)
- Beam: 46ft (14m)
- Depth: 32 ft
- Propulsion: Two triple expansion steam engine with twin screws
- Speed: 14 knots (26 km/h; 16 mph) service speed, 15.3 knots full speed

SS Arawa was a Scottish ocean liner built for the England-Oceania passenger service. She was originally operated by Shaw, Savill & Albion Line from 1884 to 1895 when Arawa was chartered by the Spanish government as "Colon", until 1898 with Arawa under her original owners. She was soon sold to Elder Dempster's Beaver Line as Lake Megantic, and in 1905 transferred to the Imperial Direct West India Mail Line as Port Henderson. In 1912, she was sold to Lanz & Wild of Italy, Anapo and in 1913 to Societa Marittima Italiana as Porto Said. Porto Said was torpedoed in 1915 having a total service career of 31 years.

She had a sister ship, SS Tainui, scrapped in 1910.

== Construction ==
Arawa was built by William Denny & Bros in Dumbarton with her engines also constructed by Denny & Bros, entirely out of mild steel. She was a clipper-style steamship, and "a fine looking, four masted, barque rigged" ship of 5,026 GRT, with two funnels, and lit by over 300 electric lamps. Her engines were triple expansion steam engines operating at 160 psi, with four cylinders, each with a stroke of 5 feet, and her steering gear was steam powered, as were the winches and cranes for cargo, the windlass and capstan. The first steam cylinder was 3'1" diameter, feeding into a 5'1" cylinder, feeding into two 5'11" cylinders. 160 psi was the highest pressure yet installed in steam liners, and the extra pressure saved about 400 tons of coal per voyage.

=== Fittings ===
She had room for 95 spacious first class passengers in the citadel amidships, in cabins with 2 beds each which could be withdrawn into the walls when not in use by a Pullman system. Some second class cabins were under the poop deck, and steerage on the 'tween decks, For entertainment, the main room had a piano, an organ, and a bookshelf. which was versatile for other uses, but could seat up to 670 as steerage.

Three refrigerators could hold 700 tons of meat; the refrigerator was "the most powerful put on board a steamer" and during the trial trip cooled to -100°F, (-73°C).

== Career ==
Arawa departed from London on her maiden voyage in November 1884, visiting Plymouth, Capetown, Port Chalmers, Lyttelton and Wellington. She completed her maiden voyage after arriving in Port Chalmers on 30 December 1884, carrying 503 passengers, (58 first class, 60 second, 151 steerage and 234 government immigrants). The voyage was speedy, arriving at Tasmania after 41 days, despite engine breakdowns slowing her 27 hours.

She would set a record of going from London to Wellington in 34 days and 17 hours, which was not beaten for some years. She made two round trips from Sydney to San Fran in 1895.

In 1895, she was transferred to the Spanish government and renamed Colon, where she and her sister Tainui (under the name Corrodonga) transported soldiers to Cuba and the Philippines, rebellious at the time. Her charter lasted until 1898 when she was given back to the Shaw Line and returned to being Arawa, but this was short lived. In 1899 or 1900, she was sold to Elder Dempster where she was put into commercial service for the Elder Dempster Line where she was named Lake Megantic, and put on their Canadian service.

Dempster's Beaver Line refitted her, giving her new boilers, taller funnels, removing the mainmast and cutting the yards from the other masts. In 1900, she was briefly in British government service during the Boer War.

Arawa (Lake Magentic) was transferred in 1905 to the Imperial Direct West India Mail Line, renamed Port Henderson and painted white, but for her funnels, painted yellow, although by this time she was aging and had relatively scant passenger amenities. At some point, she became involved in the West Indies banana trade.

She ran aground near Tripoli in 1912.

In 1911, the ship was put on a British-to-Africa route for one year before being sold to the Lanz & Wild in Genoa being named Anapo. A year later, she was sold to Soc. Marittima Italiana and renamed Porto Said.

=== Sinking ===
On 10 December 1915, during World War I, with 263 persons aboard, she was torpedoed and sunk off the coast of Cyranaica by the Kaiser's U-39, with 6 dead. A pair of Italian destroyers were nearby and attacked U-39. It was thought that some damage was done to her, or that she had been sunk, but U-39 survived the war.
