= List of shipwrecks in May 1879 =

The list of shipwrecks in May 1879 includes ships sunk, foundered, grounded, or otherwise lost during May 1879.

== 1 May ==
List of shipwrecks: 1 May 1879
Ship	State	Description
Electra	United Kingdom	The ship was driven ashore at Singapore, Straits Settlements.
Irene	United Kingdom	The brigantine was wrecked on the Coroa Grande, off the coast of Brazil. Her crew survived. She was on a voyage from Cardiff, Glamorgan to Maranhão, Brazil.

== 2 May ==
List of shipwrecks: 2 May 1879
Ship	State	Description
Francis Austin	United Kingdom	The ship ran aground in the Clyde.
Orleans	United Kingdom	The steamship caught fire and sank in the River Thames. She was refloated on 6 May and taken in to a dry dock.

== 3 May ==
List of shipwrecks: 3 May 1879
Ship	State	Description
Alexandra	United Kingdom	The steamship ran aground in the Clyde. She was refloated and resumed her voyage.
King of Algeria	Canada	The ship was sighted in the Atlantic Ocean whilst on a voyage from Philadelphia, Pennsylvania, United States to Bremen, Germany. No further trace, reported missing.
Unknown schooner	United States	The lumber schooner struck Sail Rock near the Passamaquoddy Lighthouse, Maine, and was wrecked. Her two crewmen rescued by the United States Life Saving Service.

== 4 May ==
List of shipwrecks: 4 May 1879
Ship	State	Description
Waterloo	United Kingdom	The barque ran aground at Hartlepool, County Durham. She was on a voyage from Pensacola, Florida, United States to Hartlepool. She was refloated with the assistance of five tugs and taken in to Hartlepool.
Unnamed	United Kingdom	The barge was run down and sunk in the River Thames at Charlton, Kent by the steamship Patrick Stewart (United Kingdom).

== 5 May ==
List of shipwrecks: 5 May 1879
Ship	State	Description
Jason	United Kingdom	The ship departed from Sunderland, County Durham for Colberg, Germany. No further trace, reported overdue.
Pielego	Italy	The ship was driven ashore and wrecked near Chioggia with the loss of all hands.
Syracuse	United Kingdom	The steamship foundered off Cape Bon, Algeria. Her crew were rescued by the steamship Prince Soltykoff (Russia), Syracuse was on a voyage from Odesa, Russia to Falmouth, Cornwall.
Triumph	United Kingdom	The schooner struck the Victoria Rock. She was on a voyage from Swansea, Glamorgan to Amlwch, County Antrim. She was refloated and towed in to Beaumaris, Anglesey in a sinking condition.
Vesta	United States	The brig was wrecked at Gotō, Japan. Her crew were rescued. She was on a voyage from Nagasaki, Japan to Shanghai, China.

== 6 May ==
List of shipwrecks: 6 May 1879
Ship	State	Description
China	United States	The ship was driven ashore at Lyngby, Denmark. She was on a voyage from New Orleans, Louisiana, to Riga, Russia. She was consequently condemned.
Eddissa	(United Kingdom of Great Britain and Ireland) Guernsey	The schooner was driven ashore at Lowestoft, Suffolk. She was refloated with assistance from the tug Rainbow (United Kingdom).
New Corn	United Kingdom	The ship was wrecked at Aberdeen. Her crew survived.
Nicolai	Russia	The steamship ran aground in the Moonsund off "Ermstein". She was on a voyage from Reval to Riga. She was refloated with assistance from the steamship Hercules Russia and towed in to Bolderāja in a leaky condition.
Protector	United States	The ship caught fire at Reval, Russia. She was on a voyage from Savannah, Georgia to Reval.
Truelove	United Kingdom	The ship was wrecked on the coast of Northumberland. Her seven crew were rescued.
Zina	United States	The schooner ran aground on Eastern Egg Rock in heavy seas and dense fog several miles from Jonesport, Maine and was wrecked. Her cook was washed away at the time of grounding, the rest of her crew was rescued from the rock 36 hours later by a passing boat.

== 7 May ==
List of shipwrecks: 7 May 1879
Ship	State	Description
Bismarck	Norway	The schooner was wrecked on the Knecht Sand, in the North Sea. Her crew were rescued.
Guldregen	Norway	The full-rigged ship was driven ashore in the Bali Strait. She was on a voyage from Australia to Java, Netherlands East Indies. She was refloated.
Melpomene	Denmark	The barque was abandoned in the North Sea. Her crew were rescued by the barque Valparaiso (Norway). Melpomene was on a voyage from Newcastle upon Tyne, Northumberland, United Kingdom to Sundsvall, Sweden. She was towed in to Gothenburg, Sweden in a derelict condition by the steamship Munin (Flag unknown) on 11 May.
Nereus	Netherlands	The barque ran aground at Sligo, United Kingdom. She was on a voyage from Philadelphia, Pennsylvania, United States to Sligo. She was refloated.
Trent	United Kingdom	The steamship was severely damaged by fire at Antwerp, Belgium. She was on a voyage from the River Plate to Antwerp.
Vulture	United Kingdom	The steamship ran aground at Weymouth, Dorset. She was refloated the next day.

== 8 May ==
List of shipwrecks: 8 May 1879
Ship	State	Description
Edmund	United Kingdom	The Thames barge was run down and sunk in the River Thames downstream of Gravesend, Kent by the steamship Ban-Righ (United Kingdom) with the loss of all hands.
Ocean Flower	United Kingdom	The lugger sank at the Portobello Coastguard Station, Sussex with the loss of one of her three crew. She was on a voyage from Newhaven, Sussex to the coastguard station.

== 9 May ==
List of shipwrecks: 9 May 1879
Ship	State	Description
Augusta	Norway	The barque suffered a structural failure of her hull at New Ross, County Wexford, United Kingdom. She was consequently condemned.
Chalciope	United Kingdom	The ship ran aground in the Queen's Channel. She was on a voyage from Runcorn, Cheshire to Newcastle upon Tyne, Northumberland. She was refloated with the assistance of a tug and towed in to New Ferry, Cheshire.
Hankow	China	The steamship was driven ashore at Shanghai. She was refloated.
HMS Iron Duke	Royal Navy	The Audacious-class ironclad ran aground at the mouth of the Yangtze. She was refloated with assistance 36 hours later and sailed to Nagasaki, Japan.
La Plata	Norway	The brigantine was severely damaged by fire at the Isle of May, Fife, United Kingdom. She was on a voyage from Liverpool, Lancashire, United Kingdom to Riga, Russia.
Unnamed	Flag unknown	The sloop ran aground on The Shingles, off the coast of Kent, United Kingdom.

== 10 May ==
List of shipwrecks: 10 May 1879
Ship	State	Description
Iron Cross	United Kingdom	The ship capsized at New York. She was on a voyage from Calcutta, India to New York.
Marion	United Kingdom	The schooner was driven ashore and wrecked at Saint-Valery-en-Caux, Seine-Inférieure, France.
Wastdale	United Kingdom	The steamship was damaged by fire at Stockholm, Sweden.

== 11 May ==
List of shipwrecks: 11 May 1879
Ship	State	Description
Baltic	United States	The fishing schooner struck Passamaquoddy Head Rocks, Maine, in thick fog near Life saving Station No. 1, 1st district and filled with water and broke up. Some of her rigging was salvaged. Her three crewmen rescued by the United States Life Saving Service.
George S. Low	United States	The schooner went ashore one mile (1.6 km) north of Life Saving Station No. 33, 4th District on the New Jersey shore and was wrecked. Her crew made it to shore on their own.
Natrona	Canada	The ship departed from Ivigtût, Greenland for Philadelphia, Pennsylvania, United States. No further trace after being sighted the next day, reported missing.
Seaforth	Canada	The full-rigged ship foundered in the Atlantic Ocean (39°50′N 41°00′W). Her crew were rescued by Njord (Sweden). Seaforth was on a voyage from Philadelphia, Pennsylvania, United States to Genoa, Italy.
Trenton	United States	The schooner was wrecked near Deck Island. crew saved.

== 12 May ==
List of shipwrecks: 12 May 1879
Ship	State	Description
Kron Prinz	Germany	The steamship ran aground at Calais, France. She was on a voyage from Hamburg to Calais.
Olive Branch	United Kingdom	The ship ran aground at "Ballynass", County Londonderry. She was refloated on 14 May and resumed her voyage.
Svea	Sweden	The brig was driven ashore and wrecked at Puerto Plata, Dominican Republic.

== 13 May ==
List of shipwrecks: 13 May 1879
Ship	State	Description
Concha	Spain	The steamship was driven ashore at the Chittern Chine, Isle of Wight. She was on a voyage from Bilbao, Spain to Antwerp, Belgium.
Georgian	United Kingdom	The steamship was damaged by fire at London.
Mary Farleigh	United Kingdom	The schooner ran aground off Ryde, Isle of Wight. She was on a voyage from King's Lynn, Norfolk to Whitehaven, Cumberland. She was refloated and taken in to Cowes, Isle of Wight.

== 14 May ==
List of shipwrecks: 14 May 1879
Ship	State	Description
Guiding Star	United Kingdom	The steamship struck the Bullman Rock, off Kinsale, County Cork and sank. She was on a voyage from Kinsale to Liverpool, Lancashire. She was refloated on 18 May and taken into Kinsale for temporary repairs.

== 15 May ==
List of shipwrecks: 15 May 1879
Ship	State	Description
Britannia	United Kingdom	The barque ran aground at Liverpool, Lancashire and was severely damaged. She was refloated on 19 May.
Brothers	United Kingdom	The fishing boat was driven ashore and wrecked on the Trow Rocks, on the coast of County Durham.
Chancellor	United Kingdom	The steamship ran aground at Liverpool. She was refloated.
Fifeshire	United Kingdom	The steamship ran aground near Marianople, Russia. She was refloated on 19 May.
Lycurgus	United Kingdom	The schooner was driven ashore and wrecked at Aracaju, Brazil.

== 16 May ==
List of shipwrecks: 16 May 1879
Ship	State	Description
Aporti	Italy	The barque collided with the steamship S. A. Sadler(United Kingdom) and sank at Vlissingen, Zeeland, Netherlands with the loss of a crew member.
Cyclone	United Kingdom	The steamship ran aground at "Bulgar Dere", Ottoman Empire. She was on a voyage from London to Galaţi, United Principalities. She was refloated with assistance on 18 May and resumed her voyage.
Schmidborn	Netherlands	The steamship was driven ashore at Kettleness, Yorkshire, United Kingdom. She was on a voyage from Rotterdam, South Holland to Middlesbrough, Yorkshire. She was refloated the next day and resumed her voyage.
Scotland	United Kingdom	The ship was driven ashore on Fishers Island, New York, United States. She was on a voyage from New York City to Bristol, Gloucestershire. She was refloated and resumed her voyage.
Scythia	United Kingdom	The barque ran aground on Scharhörn, Germany. She was refloated with assistance and taken in to Cuxhaven, Germany.
Unnamed	Germany	The steamship ran aground on the Fillytail Rocks, near Whitby, Yorkshire. She was refloated.

== 17 May ==
List of shipwrecks: 17 May 1879
Ship	State	Description
Alpha	United Kingdom	The schooner was driven ashore and severely damaged at Flamborough Head, Yorkshire. She was refloated on 20 May and taken in to Bridlington, Yorkshire.
Anglo-Indian	United Kingdom	The ship ran aground on the Pagansand, off Glückstadt, Germany. She was on a voyage from Mejillones, Chile to Hamburg, Germany. She was refloated.
Augusta	United Kingdom	The steamship was driven ashore on Burr Island, County Down. She was on a voyage from Glasgow, Renfrewshire to Venice, Italy. She was refloated and taken in to Belfast, County Antrim.
Benarty	United Kingdom	The steamship ran aground in the Suez Canal. She was on a voyage from London to Penang, Straits Settlements. She was refloated the next day and resumed her voyage.
Britannia	United Kingdom	The barque ran aground off Garston, Lancashire and was severely damaged. She was refloated the next day.
Chancellor	United Kingdom	The steamship ran aground at Liverpool, Lancashire. She was on a voyage from New Orleans, Louisiana, United States to Liverpool. She was refloated and docked.
John and Mary	United Kingdom	The brig ran aground on the Bouldner Bight, in The Solent. She was on a voyage from Liverpool, Lancashire to Portsmouth, Hampshire. She was refloated on 18 May and towed in to Portsmouth.
John Black	United Kingdom	The brigantine was driven ashore at Noses Point, 1 nautical mile (1.9 km) south of Seaham, County Durham. She was on a voyage from Caen, Calvados, France to Sunderland, County Durham. She was refloated on 19 May.
Marlborough	United Kingdom	The steamship ran aground at Cardiff, Glamorgan.
Ponthieu	France	The brig drifted in Mount's Bay, Cornwall, after losing a mast and her sails. She eventually grounded at Perranuthnoe and her six crew were rescued. Her captain was saved by the Coastguard using rocket apparatus and the lifeboat Richard Lewis ( Royal National Lifeboat Institution) rescued the others. Ponthieu was carrying iron-ore from Pomaron, Portugal to Liverpool.
Sparkling Wave	United States	The schooner was wrecked on Shovelful Shoal. Her crew were rescued.

== 18 May ==
List of shipwrecks: 18 May 1879
Ship	State	Description
Ada	(Russian Empire) Grand Duchy of Finland	The schooner ran aground at Narva, Russia. Her crew were rescued. She was refloated and taken in to Narva.
Christina	Sweden	The barque changed course and ran in front of the steamship Dunbar Castle (United Kingdom). The barque was cut in two and sank off the Eddystone Lighthouse, Cornwall, United Kingdom with the loss of three of the nine crew. Survivors were rescued by Dunbar Castle Christina was on a voyage from Cette, Hérault, France to Memel, Germany. A vessel observed the next day off Start Point, Devon, United Kingdom in a capsized condition was thought to be Christina.
Filippo	Italy	The barque ran aground on the Goodwin Sands, Kent, United Kingdom. She was on a voyage from New Orleans, Louisiana, United States to Kronstadt, Russia. She was refloated.
Firebrick	United Kingdom	The sloop struck the North Bishop Rock and sank. Her three crew survived for three days on the rock by eating gulls' eggs. They were rescued on 21 May by the steamship Severn. Firebrick was on a voyage from Caernarfon to the Bristol Channel.
Iris	Norway	The barque was driven ashore near Whitburn, County Durham, United Kingdom. She was on a voyage from Porsgrund to Middlesbrough, Yorkshire, United Kingdom. She was refloated and towed in to Middlesbrough.
London	United Kingdom	The steamship ran aground at "Kakkbacka", Sweden.
Mourino	United Kingdom	The steamship ran aground at "Kallbacka" or "Kalbaden", Sweden and was severely damaged. She was on a voyage from South Shields, County Durham to Kronstadt, Russia. She was refloated and completed her voyage, arriving at Kronstadt the next day.
Thetis	United Kingdom	The steamship ran aground in the Seine. She was on a voyage from Rouen, Seine-Inférieure to Glasgow, Renfrewshire. She was refloated with the assistance of a tug and resumed her voyage.
Unnamed	Sweden	The steamship was driven ashore at Staithes, Yorkshire. She was on a voyage from Hamburg, Germany to Middlesbrough. She was refloated with assistance and resumed her voyage.

== 19 May ==
List of shipwrecks: 19 May 1879
Ship	State	Description
Charley	United Kingdom	The barque ran aground north of Comorin, India. She was on a voyage from Colombo, Ceylon to Alleppie, India. She was refloated and put back to Colombo in a severely leaky condition.
Cornelia Wilhelmina	Netherlands	The ship ran aground in the Zuyder Zee. She was on a voyage from Amsterdam, North Holland to Stockholm, Sweden.
Gallia	United Kingdom	The steamship ran aground in Gednays Channel. She was on a voyage from Liverpool, Lancashire to New York, United States. She was refloated.
Gironde	France	The brigantine was wrecked at "Paroni", India. She was on a voyage from "Chandbally" to Calicut, India.
Jean Jacques	France	The ship was wrecked near Tellicherry, India.
Odessa	United Kingdom	The steamship ran aground at "Akbaroon", Russia.
Uhlenhorst	Germany	The steamship ran aground off "Collmar".

== 20 May ==
List of shipwrecks: 20 May 1879
Ship	State	Description
Amalfi	Italy	The barque was destroyed by fire at New York, United States. She was on a voyage from New York to Barcelona, Spain.
Fauna	Norway	The barque ran aground on the Dragør Sand. She was on a voyage from Memel, Germany to London, United Kingdom. She was refloated.
Hallamshire	United Kingdom	The steamship was driven ashore at Lingah, Persia. She was on a voyage from Busreh, Persia to London. She was refloated and resumed her voyage.
Rpseberry	United Kingdom	The steam yacht was severely damaged by fire at Falmouth, Cornwall.
Santina Ansaldo	Italy	The ship was damaged by an onboard explosion off Penarth, Glamorgan, United Kingdom. A crew member was severely wounded. She was on a voyage from Cardiff, Glamorgan to Livorno.

== 21 May ==
List of shipwrecks: 21 May 1879
Ship	State	Description
Canaan	(United Kingdom of Great Britain and Ireland) Gibraltar	The hulk was run into by the steamship J. E. McConnell (United Kingdom) at Gibraltar and was severely damaged. She was beached.
Esmeralda	Chilean Navy	Esmeralda War of the Pacific, Battle of Iquique: The wooden-hulled steam corvette was sunk by the ironclad turret ship Huáscar (Peruvian Navy).
Independencia	Peruvian Navy	Independencia War of the Pacific, Battle of Punta Gruesa: The armored corvette ran aground while chasing the steam schooner Covadonga (Chilean Navy). Independencia was destroyed by the ironclad turret ship Huáscar (Peruvian Navy) to prevent her capture by Chile.
Whitehaven	United Kingdom	The steamship was wrecked on the Horse Rock, in the Bristol Channel. Her crew were rescued.

== 22 May ==
List of shipwrecks: 22 May 1879
Ship	State	Description
Essex	United Kingdom	The ship was sighted in the Indian Ocean whilst on a voyage from Bassein, India to a British port. No further trace, reported overdue.
Shadwan	United Kingdom	The steamship ran aground at Plymouth, Devon and sank at the stern. She was on a voyage from Sulina, United Principalities to Plymouth. She was refloated and taken in to Plymouth.
Timandra	United States	During a voyage from Honolulu, Hawaii, to the Arctic with a cargo of 75 tons of general merchandise and a crew of 12, the 119.88-ton brig was wrecked without loss of life on a reef in the Bering Sea off the west end of Nunivak Island.

== 23 May ==
List of shipwrecks: 23 May 1879
Ship	State	Description
Boyne	United Kingdom	The brig sank off Clonakilty, County Cork. All on board survived. She was on a voyage from Cardiff, Glamorgan to Tralee, County Kerry.
Curacoa Packet	Netherlands	The ship was driven ashore on "Grand Avis Island". Her crew were rescued.
Dwina	United Kingdom	The steamship was damaged by fire at Rotherhithe, Surrey.
Jane Fish	United States	The full-rigged ship ran aground on the Goodwin Sands, Kent, United Kingdom. She was refloated and taken in to The Downs.
Penguin	United Kingdom	The steamship ran aground in the Clyde at Dumbarton and was damaged. She was refloated.
Solway	United Kingdom	The steamship was damaged by fire at sea. She was on a voyage from Bushire, Persia to Constantinople, Ottoman Empire.

== 24 May ==
List of shipwrecks: 24 May 1879
Ship	State	Description
Ava	United Kingdom	The steamship was run into by the full-rigged ship Brenhilda (United Kingdom) and sank in the Bay of Bengal 70 nautical miles (130 km) off the mouth of the Hooghly River with the loss of 70 of the 123 people on board. Survivors were rescued by Brenhilda. Ava was on a voyage from Calcutta, India to London.
Templar	United Kingdom	The barque ran aground at Warrenpoint, County Antrim.

== 25 May ==
List of shipwrecks: 25 May 1879
Ship	State	Description
Timandra	United States	The brig was wrecked on "Nouvivak Island", Department of Alaska. Her crew of 12 survived.

== 26 May ==
List of shipwrecks: 26 May 1879
Ship	State	Description
Benbow	United Kingdom	The steamship ran aground at Maassluis, South Holland, Netherlands. She was on a voyage from London to Rotterdam, South Holland. She was refloated with the assistance of a tug.
Harefield	United Kingdom	The steamship ran aground at Maassluis. She was on a voyage from Barrow-in-Furness, Lancashire to Rotterdam. She was refloated with the assistance of a tug.
John Coggin	United Kingdom	The brig sprang a leak and was beached at Lowestoft, Suffolk.
Olivari	United States	The ship ran aground at Drogheda, County Louth, United Kingdom. She was on a voyage from Baltimore, Maryland to Drogheda.
Unity	United Kingdom	The steamship ran aground at "Quenizec", Russia. She was refloated.

== 27 May ==
List of shipwrecks: 27 May 1879
Ship	State	Description
Pandora	United Kingdom	The ship departed from Plymouth, Devon for A Coruña, Spain. No further trace, reported missing.

== 28 May ==
List of shipwrecks: 28 May 1879
Ship	State	Description
Charles W. Anderson	United Kingdom	The steamship ran aground at Penarth, Glamorgan. She was refloated.
Factor	United Kingdom	The Thames barge was run into by the steamship Wega (flag unknown) in the River Thames and was severely damaged. She was towed in to Millwall, Middlesex by the tug Susannah and sank there.
Midlothian	United Kingdom	The steamship ran aground at Brăila, United Principalities. She was on a voyage from Brăila to Marseille, Bouches-du-Rhône, France.
Neptune's Car	United Kingdom	The ship was driven ashore on Antigua. She was refloated.

== 29 May ==
List of shipwrecks: 29 May 1879
Ship	State	Description
Aruba	United Kingdom	The schooner ran aground on the Whitburn Steel, off the coast of Northumberland. She was refloated and towed in to Sunderland, County Durham.
Henriette	France	The barque ran aground at Hooghly Point, India. She was on a voyage from Mauritius to Calcutta, India. She was refloated on 31 May and completed her voyage.
Jennie S. Barker	United States	The ship ran aground at Arica, Chile. She was on a voyage from Pisagua, Chile to Arica.
John Wells	United Kingdom	The steamship ran aground in the River Ouse at Whitgift, Yorkshire. She was refloated and resumed her voyage.
Monaro	New South Wales	The steamship was wrecked on a reef 10 nautical miles (19 km) off Moruya. All on board were rescued.
Samanood	Egypt	The government steamship, already leaking and having lost her rudder on a voyage to Mauritius, was encountered 50 nautical miles (93 km) from the island by the steamship Neera (United Kingdom) on 29 May. Samanood had some passengers and 104 crew, most of whom were saved and landed at Réunion; 23 were drowned when their boat sank. The steamer was believed to have sunk soon after the rescue.

== 30 May ==
List of shipwrecks: 30 May 1879
Ship	State	Description
City of Ningpo	United Kingdom	The ship ran aground on the Longsand, off Tanjore, India. She was on a voyage from London to Calcutta, India. She was refloated and completed her voyage.
Trinculo	United Kingdom	The barque was disabled in a hurricane and run ashore on Ninety Mile Beach, Victoria. She was on a voyage from King George Sound, Western Australia to Newcastle, New South Wales in ballast. All crew survived.
Wellington	United Kingdom	The ketch collided with the barque Macedonia (United Kingdom) off Dover, Kent. She was on a voyage from London to Pembroke. She was towed in to Dover, where she sank.
Unnamed	Flag unknown	The ship foundered between Ailsa Craig and the Corsewall Lighthouse, Wigtownshire, United Kingdom. She may have collided with another vessel, which may have rescued her crew.

== 31 May ==
List of shipwrecks: 31 May 1879
Ship	State	Description
Charles S. Rogers	United States	The schooner was sunk in a collision with Hercules (United States) near Life Saving Station No. 9, 2nd District on the Massachusetts shore. Her crew was rescued by Hercules, except one crewman who drowned. Her cargo was salvaged.

== Unknown date ==
List of shipwrecks: Unknown date in May 1879
Ship	State	Description
Ada Barton	Canada	The barque was abandoned in the Atlantic Ocean. She was subsequently towed in to Halifax, Nova Scotia by the steamship Naples (United Kingdom).
Alice Ritson	United Kingdom	The barque struck a submerged rock and foundered in the Pacific Ocean. She was on a voyage from Callao, Peru to Pisagua, Chile.
Ambrosia	United Kingdom	The barque was abandoned in the Atlantic Ocean before 7 May.
Amicie	France	The steamship sank at Port-en-Bessin, Calvados. She was on a voyage from Newcastle upon Tyne, Northumberland, United Kingdom to Port-en-Bessin. She was refloated but was consequently condemned.
Australia	United Kingdom	The steamship was damaged by fire at Malta.
Avena	Flag unknown	The steamship was driven ashore at Honfleur, Manche, France. She was on a voyage from Königsberg, Germany to Honfleur.
Benjamin Dickerman	United States	The ship was driven ashore at Chesapeake, Virginia. She was on a voyage from Baltimore, Maryland to Matanzas, Cuba.
Ceres	United Kingdom	The smack was run down and sunk in the Bristol Channel off Ilfracombe, Devon with the loss of all three crew. She was on a voyage from Cardiff, Glamorgan to Padstow, Cornwall.
Chunar	British Raj	The steamship ran aground at Diamond Harbour before 3 May. She subsequently broke her back.
Don	United Kingdom	The steamship ran aground at Bridlington, Yorkshire. She was on a voyage from Sunderland, County Durham to Poole, Dorset.
Doreas	United Kingdom	The steamship ran aground at Heligoland. She was refloated and taken in to Hamburg, Germany.
Egbert	United Kingdom	The steamship ran aground off Mokha, Aden Colony. She was on a voyage from the River Tyne to Bombay, India. She was refloated and completed her voyage.
Ella S. Thayer	United States	The ship was driven ashore at Spithami, Russia. She was on a voyage from Savannah, Georgia to Reval, Russia. She was later refloated with assistance from the steamship Dwina (Russia) and taken in to Reval.
Emiliano	Spain	The steamship was damaged by fire at Matanzas. She was on a voyage from Matanzas to Liverpool, Lancashire, United Kingdom.
Gamma	Flag unknown	The brig capsized in the North Sea 80 nautical miles (150 km) east south east of the mouth of the Humber before 26 May.
George	Germany	The barque ran aground on the Shoebury Sand, in the Thames Estuary. She was on a voyage from London, United Kingdom to Egersund, Norway.
Gesiena	Netherlands	The ship was driven ashore at Gioia Tauro, Italy. Her crew were rescued.
Gironde	France	The ship was lost in a cyclone. Her crew were rescued. She was on a voyage from the Malabar Coast to the Coromandel Coast.
Gladstone	United Kingdom	The schooner ran aground at Dragør, Denmark. She was on a voyage from Alloca, Clackmannanshire to Königsberg, Germany.
Hélène	France	The ship was wrecked at Saint-Pierre, Saint Pierre and Miquelon. Her crew were rescued.
Hera	United States	The ship was driven ashore at Galveston, Texas. She was on a voyage from Galveston to Bremen, Germany. She was refloated on 26 May.
Ida	United Kingdom	The brigantine foundered in the Atlantic Ocean before 2 May. Her crew survived.
Iron Duke	United Kingdom	The ship was driven ashore at Fisherman's Point, in the Hooghly River. She was on a voyage from Calcutta, India to Dundee, Forfarshire. She was refloated and put back to Calcutta.
Johann	Flag unknown	The ship collided with a Brazilian vessel at the mouth of the Rio Grande and was beached. She was on a voyage from Liverpool to the Rio Grande. She was refloated and taken in to the Rio Grande in a waterlogged condition.
Joluca	Flag unknown	The ship was driven ashore near Veracruz, Mexico. Her crew were rescued.
Lebanon	United Kingdom	The brig was driven ashore at Ostly, Öland, Sweden. She was on a voyage from Helsingborg to Paskallavik.
Leonie	United Kingdom	The ship was lost in the Atlantic Ocean. Her crew were rescued. She was on a voyage from Liverpool to Prince Edward Island, Canada.
L'Hirondelle	France	The ship was driven ashore before 18 May. She was on a voyage from Japan to Le Havre, Seine-Inférieure. She was refloated and taken in to Nassau, Bahamas.
Lotus	United Kingdom	The ship was driven ashore at Cape Ray, Newfoundland Colony. She was on a voyage from London to Quebec City, Canada.
Louise H.	Germany	The steamship was driven ashore in Chesapeake Bay. She was on a voyage from Baltimore, Maryland to Hamburg. She was refloated, and resumed her voyage on 3 May.
Maid of Mona	(United Kingdom of Great Britain and Ireland) Isle of Man	The schooner ran aground at "Sondre Rose", Denmark. She was on a voyage from Danzig, Germany to an English port.
Marlborough	United Kingdom	The steamship ran aground on the West Bute Sand, off Cardiff.
Mary E. Riggs	United States	The ship was wrecked on the Florida Reef, in the Bahamas. She was on a voyage from New Orleans, Louisiana, to Bremen.
Mattea	Austria-Hungary	The barque was driven ashore at the "Vasoux Lighthouse". She was on a voyage from New York, United States to Honfleur.
Matson	United Kingdom	The smack was run down and sunk in the Bristol Channel.
Memphis	United Kingdom	The steamship ran aground off Sandhamn, Sweden. She was on a voyage from Grimsby, Lincolnshire to Stockholm, Sweden.
Ocean Phantom	United Kingdom	The ship was driven ashore and wrecked on Anticosti Island, Nova Scotia. Her crew survived. She was on a voyage from Liverpool to the Saint Lawrence River
Ortolan	United States	The brig was driven ashore. She was on a voyage from Philadelphia, Pennsylvania to Havana, Cuba. She was refloated and put back to Philadelphia.
Phoenix	United Kingdom	The fishing smack capsized and sank in a squall off Blakeney, Norfolk with the loss of all six crew.
P. Wickstrom, jun.	Sweden	The barque was wrecked on Inagua, Bahamas. Her crew were rescued.
Romeo	United Kingdom	The smack ran aground at Great Yarmouth, Norfolk. She was refloated but consequently sank. Her crew were rescued.
San Pasquall	Italy	The brig was driven ashore at Gioia Tauro. Her crew were rescued.
Scots Bay	United Kingdom	The barque was driven ashore west of Dunkirk, Nord, France. She was on a voyage from Huanillos, Chile to Dunkirk.
Silas	United Kingdom	The brig was abandoned in the Atlantic Ocean. Her crew were rescued.
Tres Sobrinas	Spain	The ship was wrecked on the Hogsty Reef before 21 May. She was on a voyage from Manzanilla, Trinidad to Le Havre.
Tulchan	United Kingdom	The barque capsized and sank in the Schuylkill River. She was later refloated and taken in to PhiladelphiaPhiladelphia for repairs.
Zingu	United Kingdom	The brigantine was driven ashore in St Peter's Bay, Nova Scotia, Canada.
Unnamed	Flag unknown	The steamship ran aground on the Shipwash Sand, in the North Sea off the coast of Suffolk, United Kingdom.
