= SS Geiser (1881) =

History
- Name: Geiser
- Owner: Thingvalla Line
- Port of registry: Copenhagen, Denmark
- Builder: Burmeister & Wain
- Cost: $300,000
- Yard number: 118
- Launched: August 1881
- Completed: 4 January 1882
- Acquired: 4 January 1882
- Maiden voyage: 10 January 1882
- In service: 10 January 1882
- Out of service: 14 August 1888
- Identification: Call sign: NSVM
- Fate: Sank after a collision on 14 August 1888

General characteristics
- Type: Passenger ship
- Tonnage: 2,831 GRT
- Length: 98.9 m (324 ft 6 in)
- Beam: 12 m (39 ft 4 in)
- Depth: 6.7 m (22 ft 0 in)
- Installed power: One 2 cyl. compound steam engine
- Propulsion: One screw
- Sail plan: Copenhagen – Kristiania – Kristiansand – New York City
- Speed: 11 knots (20 km/h; 13 mph)
- Capacity: Accommodation for 1,000 passengers (50 in First class, 50 in Second class, 900 in Steerage)
- Crew: 53
- Notes: Three masts and a single funnel

SS Geiser was a Danish transatlantic passenger ship that sank after colliding with SS Thingvalla on 14 August 1888 in the Atlantic Ocean 30 nautical miles (56 km) south of Cape Sable Island, Nova Scotia, Canada while she was travelling from New York City, United States to Copenhagen, Denmark with the loss of 105 lives.

== Construction ==
Geiser was built at the Burmeister & Wain shipyard in Copenhagen, Denmark and launched in August 1881 before being completed in January 1882. The ship was 98.9 metres (324 ft 6 in) long, had a beam of 12 metres (39 ft 4 in) and a depth of 6.7 metres (22 ft 0 in). She was assessed at 2,831 gross register tons (GRT) and had one two-cylinder compound steam engine driving a single screw propeller that could achieve a speed of 11 knots (20 km/h; 13 mph). The ship had accommodation for 1,000 passengers including 50 in First class, 50 in Second class, and 900 in Steerage. Geiser was divided into five watertight compartments and carried eight large lifeboats on her boat deck.

== Career ==
Geiser sailed on her maiden voyage from Copenhagen to New York City with stopovers in Kristiania and Kristiansand on 10 January 1882. The voyage went without incident and Geiser would serve this route for the rest of her career. The ship suffered her first maritime incident on 17 January 1885 as she ran aground in the Christianiafjord and suffered minor damage before she was able to be refloated with the help of the icebreaker Mjølner and taken back to Copenhagen for repairs. Geiser would herself also offer aid to stricken vessels on two occasions, the first occurred in June 1885 as the Cunard Liner Gallia suffered a broken propellershaft and Geiser attempted to tow the ship back to port, however the towline snapped and damaged some of Geiser's railing. The second rescue occurred on 12 April 1888 as Geiser successfully towed the Norddeutscher Lloyd's Donau to New York after the ship lost her propeller.

== Loss ==
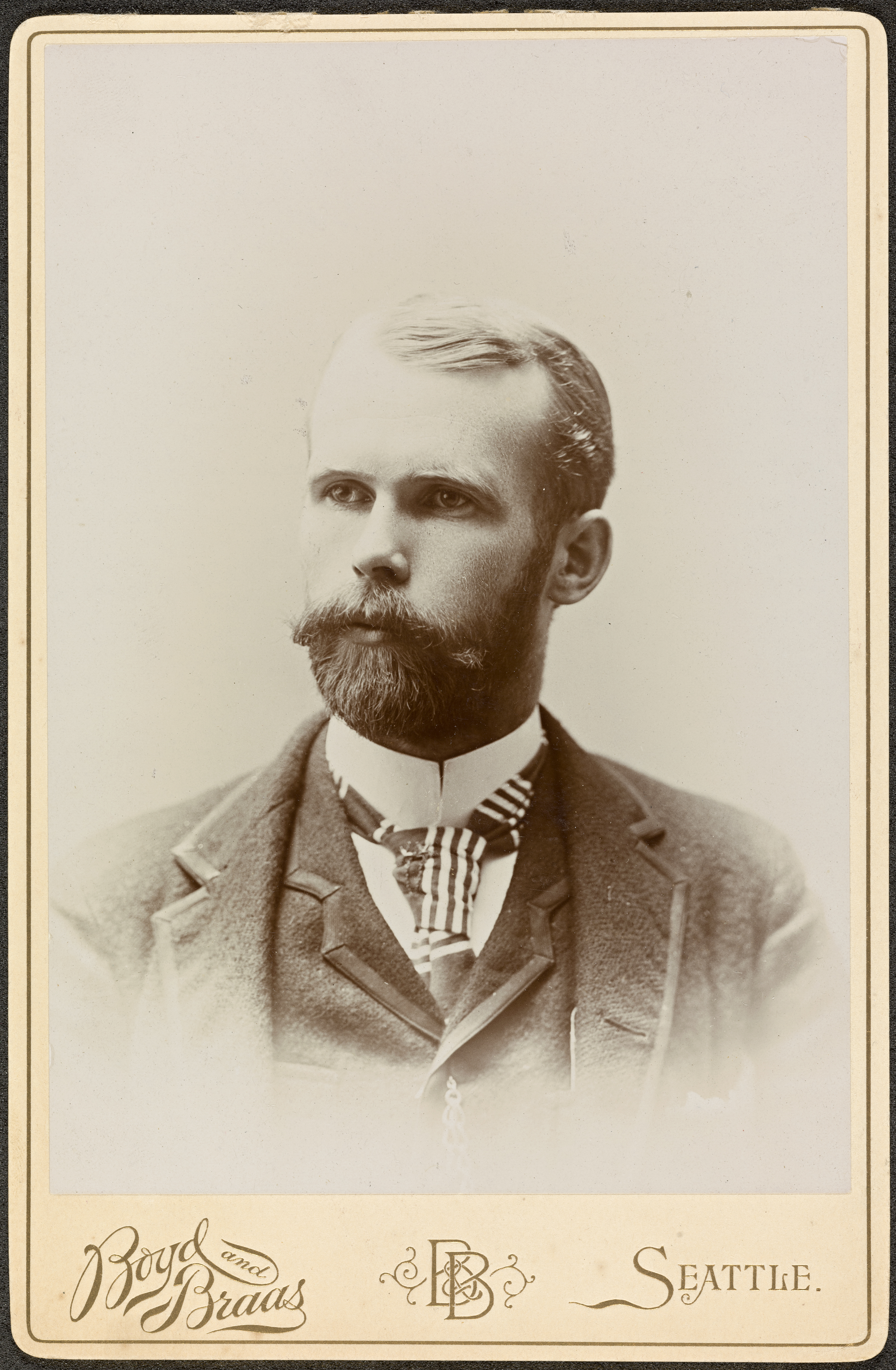
Norwegian photographer Anders Beer Wilse, who survived the sinking, seen pictured here in 1892.

Geiser departed New York, United States for Copenhagen, Denmark on 11 August 1888 under the command of Captain Carl W. Møller and was three days into her journey when she encountered rain and fog as she was sailing along the coast of Newfoundland, south of Sable Island. At 3.35 am SS Thingvalla, which was also operated by the Thingvalla Line and heading for New York from Copenhagen, struck Geiser amidships on her starboard side at full speed and broke the ship in half. Thingvalla's bow smashed through the stateroom of Second officer Jørgensen on Geiser, who was awakened by the violent incursion into his room and upon seeing that he could not escape the room as his door was blocked, grabbed a hold of Thingvalla's anchor chain as the ships separated and climbed up on Thingvalla's boat deck. The crew aboard Geiser sounded the alarm so all sleeping passengers and crew would emerge on deck as the ship quickly began to take on a heavy list to starboard and settle in the water. One of the passengers, the Norwegian photographer Anders Beer Wilse, emerged on the boat deck and saw a person trying to free one of Geiser's eight lifeboats and attempted to help free the boat. After cutting the boat loose and emptying it of contents such as buckets, ropes, wood pieces and lifebelts, they tried to get it off the two wooden blocks the lifeboat was resting on. But the four men that had grouped around the lifeboat couldn't get it to budge as it was glued on the wooden blocks due to the many coats of paint that it had received over the years. Wilse then hoped the boat would dislodge when the Geiser would go down and managed to get a hold of a lifebelts, but it was so decayed that he could stick his hand right through the canvas and cork it was made of. Not long after, Geiser sank stern first just five minutes after the collision.

In the meantime, Thingvalla had sailed away from the wrecksite as to not accidentally drag any survivors into her propellers and waited for an hour before she launched three of her own lifeboats to go in search of survivors from the ship they had just sunk. They pulled several people from the icy water and even encountered one of Geiser's upside down lifeboats that carried 12 survivors including Captain Møller. After having rescued 31 survivors (14 passengers and 17 crew), it became apparent that no signs of life remained at the wrecksite and the rescue operation was halted. Among the saved was Anders Beer Wilse, the second officer and captain of Geiser and Hilda Lind, the only female survivor of the disaster. In the end 72 passengers and 33 crew were lost with Geiser, bringing the total death toll to 105. The 31 survivors were treated in Thingvalla's sick bay for various injuries as the crew of Thingvalla was trying to save their own ship. Thingvalla's bow had been crushed in about 9 metres (30 ft) and the damage came within 5 centimetres (2.0 in) of the first watertight bulkhead, which was strengthened by Thingvalla's crew by the use of wooden logs. That afternoon, the German ocean liner Wieland stumbled upon the damaged Thingvalla and it was decided that Wieland would take on all 450 passengers from Thingvalla and the 31 survivors from Geiser and land them at New York while Thingvalla would be towed by the fishing vessel Capio to Halifax for repairs. Both ships arrived at their destinations on 16 August 1888.
