= SS Lake Champlain (1874) =

1874 steamship

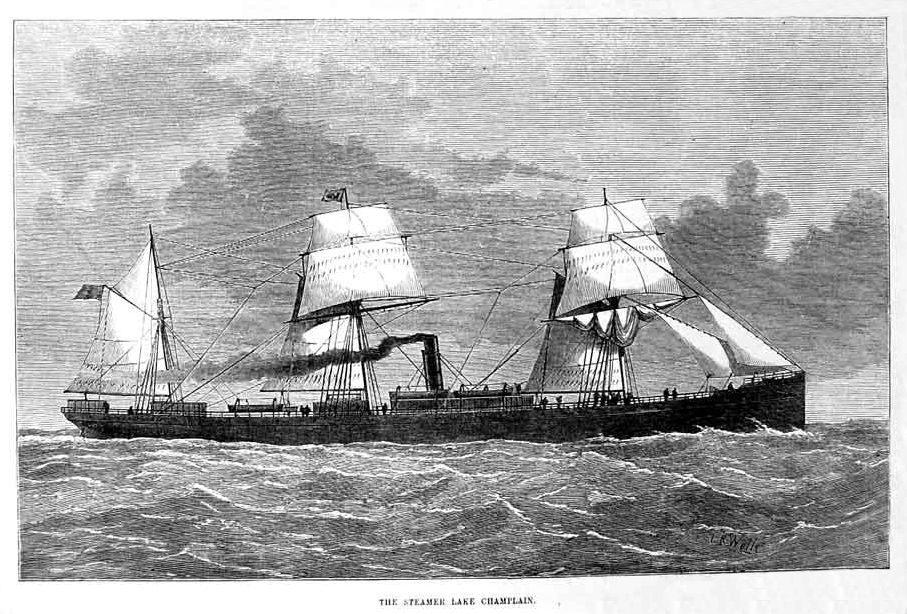

History
- Name: Lake Champlain (1874–1886); Lismore (1886–1888)
- Owner: Canada Shipping Company
- Port of registry: Canada
- Builder: London & Glasgow Co. Ltd.
- Launched: 25 December 1874
- Maiden voyage: 13 April 1875
- Fate: Wrecked 1888

General characteristics
- Type: Iron screw-steamer
- Tonnage: 2,207 GRT
- Length: 321 ft (98 m)
- Beam: 35 ft (11 m)
- Depth: 26 ft (7.9 m)
- Decks: 3
- Installed power: 250 hp (190 kW) steam engines
- Sail plan: Barque

SS Lake Champlain was built in 1874 at Glasgow by the shipbuilders London & Glasgow Co. Ltd., she was launched on Christmas Day 1874 and sailed for a mere 13 years. On 13 April 1875, she departed on her maiden voyage from Liverpool to Quebec and then to Montreal. Until 1884, her regular run was between Liverpool and Quebec. On 23 November 1885, near Matane, she collided with the SS Bentholme which sank as a result. On 30 June 1886, she ran aground on the Antrim coast, but was refloated, sold, and renamed Lismore. On 8 June 1888, she was wrecked at Porto Plata in the Dominican Republic.

This iron screw-steamer was the first of the Beaver Line steamships and was set to sail between Liverpool, Quebec, and Montreal when navigation of the Saint Lawrence River was ice-free. In the winter, she would run between Liverpool and any American port.

Lake Champlain's hull and 250-horsepower engines were constructed by the London and Glasgow Engineering and Iron Shipbuilding Company at Govan. Owned by the Canada Shipping Company of Montreal and Liverpool, she was registered in Montreal, the first Clyde-built steamer under the Dominion flag. Measuring 321 ft. with a 35 ft. beam and 26 ft. deep hold, she was rated at 2,207 tons gross. She had three decks, the upper deck being a spar deck and the others designed for carrying passengers. Barque-rigged, and equipped with steam steering-gear, steam windlass for raising anchors and four steam winches, she was a state-of-the-art ship.

Her design was intended to withstand the worst weather of the Atlantic, and her hull had been specially strengthened for any contact with ice. On her sea trial from Greenock, she ran between the Cloch and Cumbrae lighthouses, a distance of 13.666 nautical miles (25.309 km; 15.727 mi), in under seventy-one minutes.

Lake Champlain had two sister-ships named Lake Nepigon (1875-1896) and Lake Magantic (1875-1878).
