= SS Gallia (1879) =

Cunard line ship

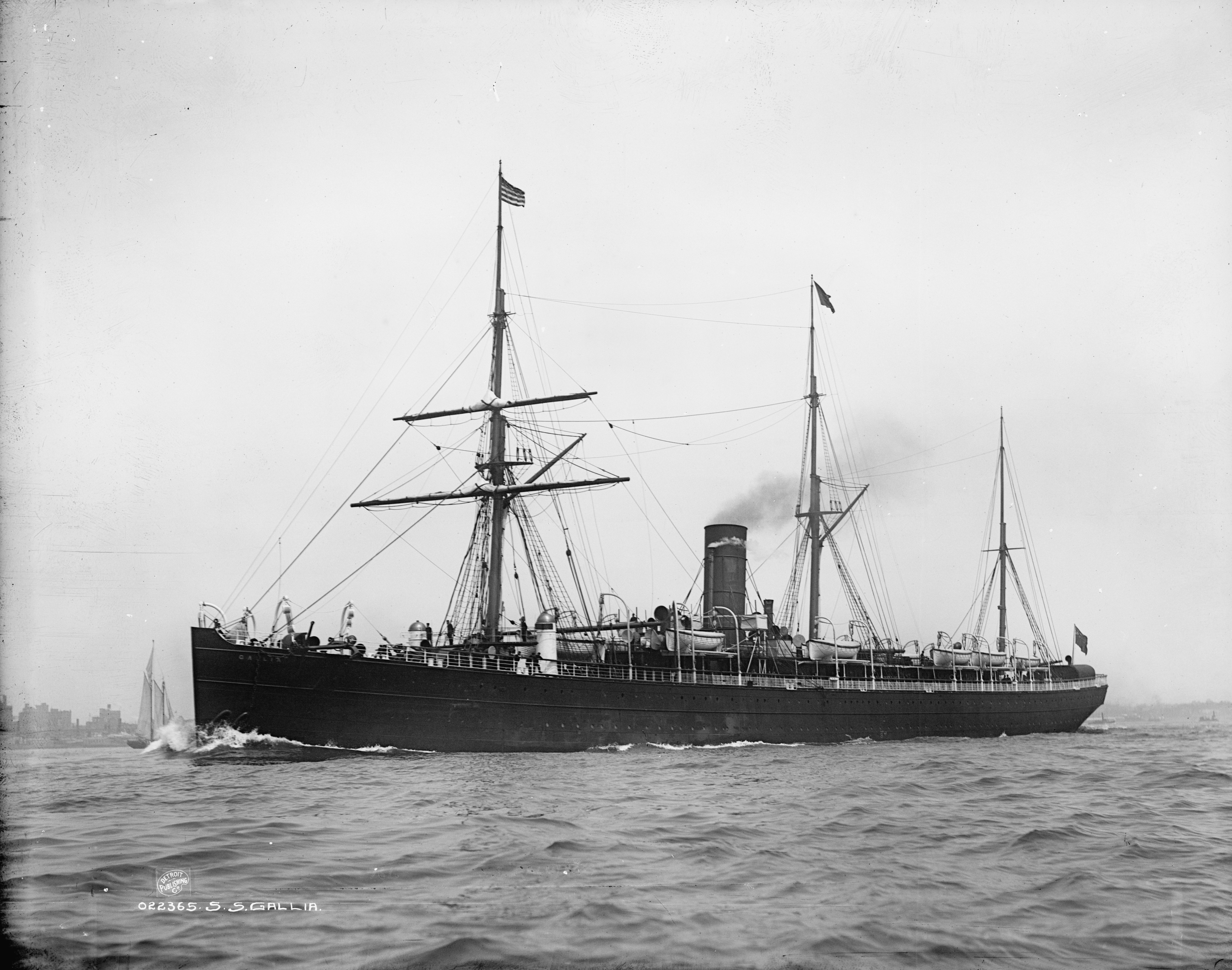

History

United Kingdom
- Name: Gallia
- Owner: Cunard Line (1879–1897); Beaver Line (1897–1899); Allan Line (1899–1900)
- Operator: Cunard Line (1879–1897)
- Port of registry: Liverpool
- Route: Liverpool-Queenstown-New York
- Builder: James & George Thomson, Clydebank
- Yard number: 163
- Launched: 12 November 1878
- Completed: April 1879
- Maiden voyage: 5 April 1879
- In service: 1879
- Out of service: 1900
- Identification: United Kingdom Official Number 78837
- Fate: Scrapped 1900

General characteristics
- Type: Ocean liner
- Tonnage: 4,809 GRT; 3,082 NRT
- Length: 430.1 ft (131.1 m)
- Beam: 44.6 ft (13.6 m)
- Depth: 26.8 ft (8.2 m)
- Decks: 3
- Installed power: 700 nhp
- Propulsion: Triple cylinder, single screw
- Speed: 13 knots (24 km/h; 15 mph)

RMS Gallia was built in 1878 for the Cunard Line, entering service in 1879. In service until 1899, the vessel ran aground off the coast of Quebec, Canada and was not repaired. The ship was broken up for scrap in 1900.

== Career ==
She departed Liverpool on her maiden voyage on 5 April 1879, en route to Queenstown then New York.

In 1885, Gallia's shaft had broken and an attempt by SS Geiser of the Thingvalla Line to tow her was made, and failed.

On 17 June 1887 Gallia was chartered by White Star Line for one voyage.

In 1896, Gallia was chartered by the Cia Trasatlántica and renamed Don Alvaro de Bazan. Later that year, she went back to Cunard and was reverted to Gallia. By late 1897, Gallia was sold to the Beaver Line though maintained her name, and first sailed with the Beaver Line on 20 November from Liverpool to Halifax to St John. Now in May 1899, the aged Gallia was chartered to the Allan Line, who still kept her name. She ran aground on 14 May 1899 near Sorel Point, Quebec, and was raised, but not repaired. On 17 February 1900 Gallia arrived in Cherbourg for scrap.

The Gallia was mentioned in season 3 of The Gilded Age (2025), as the ship that fictitious socialite Bertha Russell is considering travelling on to visit her daughter, the Duchess of Buckingham, in England.
