= Beaver Line =

Shipping company

- Beaver Line service provided by Elder Dempster
- Industry: Shipping and transportation
- Founded: 1867; 159 years ago
- Fate: 1898: Became subsidiary of Elder Dempster Line; 1903: Purchased by Canadian Pacific Steamship Company
- Headquarters: Liverpool, England
- Area served: Transatlantic and Canadian routes
- Footnotes; Funnel color: Black with two white bands

The Canadian Steamship Company, better known as the Beaver Line, was a shipping company formed in 1867, that sailed ships from Liverpool to Quebec and Montreal. Initially starting off with iron sailing ships, they moved into steamships in the 1870s.

The company's first ships ordered four 1,000 ton sailing ships: Lake Ontario, Lake Erie, Lake Michigan, and Lake Huron. They began experimenting with steamships in the 1870s, chartering a number before ordering their first steamers in 1878. During this time, the company became known as the "Beaver Line", due to its house flag which adorned a beaver.

The company experienced difficulties in the early 1890s, and in 1894 liquidators took control, suspending sailings until the spring of 1895 when creditors received a payment. A new company, Beaver Line Associated Steamers was floated in November 1897 and operated a weekly service from Liverpool to Quebec and Montreal in the summer and Halifax and Portland in winter.

In December 1898, the Elder Dempster Line settled the Beaver Line's outstanding claims and subsequently bought the company. From 1898 to 1903, Elder Dempster ran the Beaver Line of Steamers service before selling their Canadian interests to the Canadian Pacific Steamship Company.

== Fleet ==
- Assaye
- Carlisle City
- Gallia
- Lake Champlain
- Lake Erie (sail)
- Lake Huron (sail)
- Lake Huron
- Lake Manitoba
- Lake Megantic
- Lake Michigan (sail)
- Lake Nepigon
- Lake Ontario (sail)
- Lake Ontario
- Lake Superior (sail)
- Lake Superior
- Lake Winnipeg
- Ruapehu (chartered)
- Tongariro
