= Rescue of the SS Danmark =

1889 maritime incident in the northern Atlantic Ocean

Coordinates: 46°16′0″N 38°36′0″W

Lewis Mueller-Original Painting

The rescue of the SS Danmark began on April 6, 1889, when the cargo ship, SS Missouri, came to the rescue of the sinking SS Danmark and saved all of the passengers and crew of the Danmark.

The Danmark was part of the Thingvalla Line and was a 3414-ton steamship. On this its last voyage, it carried 59 crew members and 665 passengers from Denmark, Sweden, and Norway who were on board for emigration to America. On March 20, 1889, the Danmark began its journey from Copenhagen to New York to deliver its passengers. The bulk of the passengers were in the steerage, with only 26 passengers in cabins.

The Danmark had fought high winds and high seas from March 24, 1889. On April 4, 1889, the winds had become more violent, and the swells which the Danmark rode were mountainous. Most of the passengers became ill. By April 5, 1889, the Danmark was in terrible trouble and sinking, having survived high winds but with a severely damaged hull from a hole caused by her propeller shaft when it snapped. The ship was unable to make any headway but its engines were kept running so that the pumps could keep pumping the water to keep the ship from sinking. The Captain C.B. Knudsen had considered abandoning the ship but was concerned that the lifeboats would be overturned in the high seas.

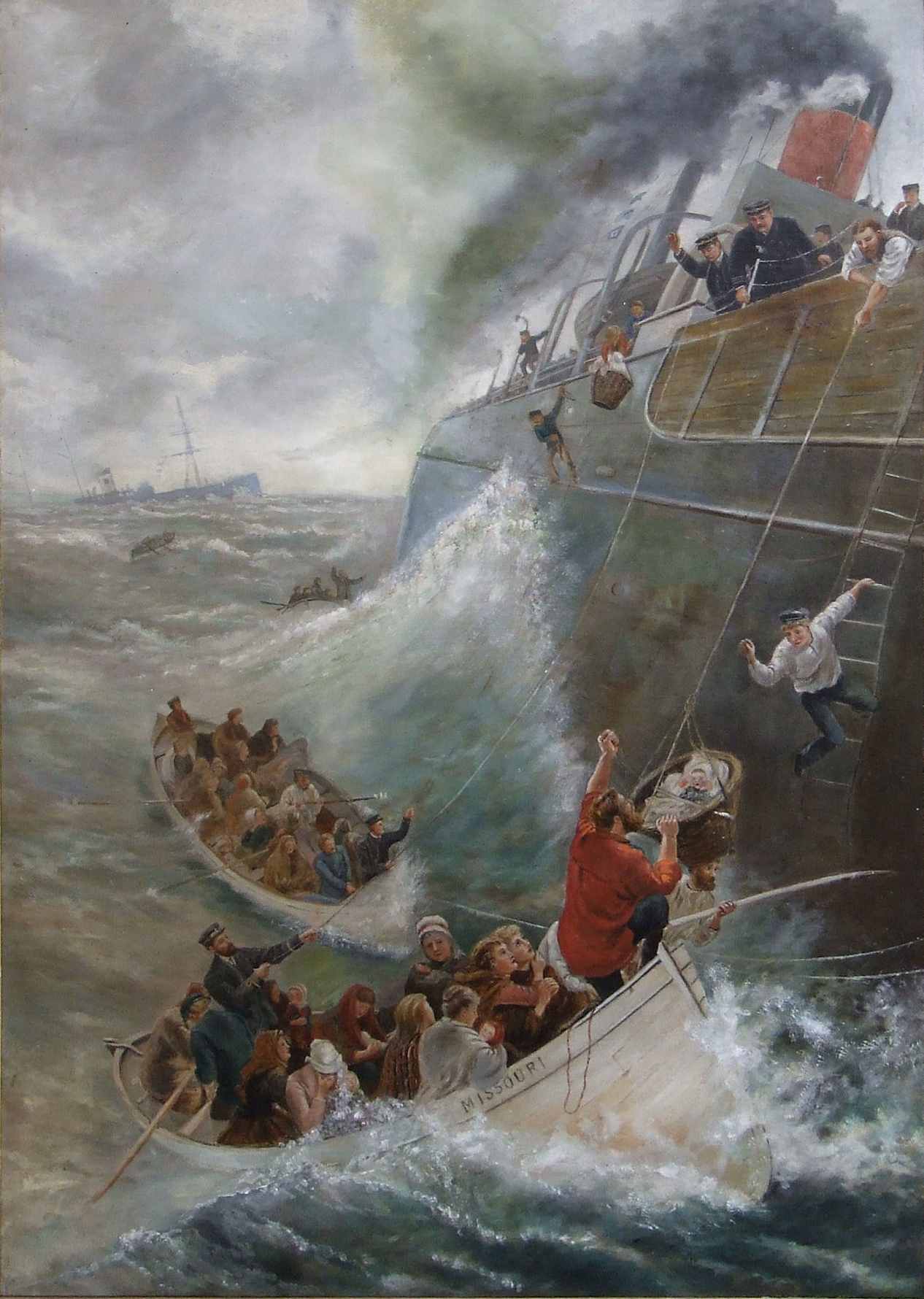
And Every Soul Was Saved, painting by Thomas M. M. Hemy, 1889

On April 5, 1889, the SS Missouri came upon the disabled Danmark in bad weather and high seas. Fortunately, for the crew and the passengers of the Danmark, the Missouri happened upon the Danmark because it had taken on such a large cargo in London that she was ordered to proceed straight from London and Philadelphia and skip Swansea. The Missouri was one of four freighters built for the Atlantic Transport Line to carry cargo, cattle, and goods between London, Swansea, Philadelphia, and Baltimore. The Missouri was 2,845 tons and manned by a crew of 37. Because it was a freighter and had insufficient quarters for people and supplies, it could only accommodate an additional 20 people. Because its cargo hold was built to haul cattle, it had a large fresh water condenser capable of condensing 8,000 gallons of water per day. Upon seeing the distress flags of the Danmark, its Captain, Hamilton Murrell, immediately ordered his crew to set a course for the Danmark, and he steered as close as possible to the disabled steamship.

Because of the bad weather and his inability to accommodate the passengers, Captain Murrell decided not to risk the open sea transfer and instead offered to tow the Danmark to St. John. It took several hours to attach the tow lines because of the strong winds and heavy seas, but eventually the process was completed. The Missouri was able to the tow the Danmark but, because of the gale, it was hard going. When the storm increased in intensity, the Danmark was carried away and the wire bridle of the tow line was ripped away. However, the tow line held, and the Danmark did not go adrift. Because the Missouri was making no progress, and Captain Murrell had seen ice ahead, he decided to change course for the Azores. Three hours later, Captain Knudsen signaled that the Danmark was continuing to sink and would not make the trip to the Azores.

Captain Murrell ordered the tow line to be cut and ordered that the cargo be thrown overboard. The Danmark was told that the Missouri using its two life boats would begin the transfer of passengers and crew because the sea conditions would only allow the best of sailors to keep the lifeboats from crashing into the two ships. The second and third officers of the Missouri were ordered to begin the transfer, beginning with women and children first, in groups of 22-24. Because the first life boat contained babies and small children, Captain Murrell lowered coal baskets with ropes to pull the babies aboard. The larger children and other passengers were lifted onto the Missouri using ropes. As the weather slightly improved, Captain Murrell ordered the Danmark to use its seven lifeboats to bring over more passengers and whatever food supplies the Danmark had on board.

After almost five hours, all of the passengers had been taken aboard the Missouri. They were given hot tea and biscuits. Captain Murrell ordered the crew to abandon the Danmark because fog had begun to roll in, and he was afraid that they would lose sight of the Danmark. Captain Knudsen was the last to leave the Danmark because he was reluctant to abandon his ship. Three valuable dogs were killed because there was no room on the Missouri for them. By nightfall, the Danmark sank, leaving no trace of where it had been. Other sources disagree with this last sentence. Danish newspapers could on April 13 report: "London, 12. April. A depeche from Queenstown (Ireland) states that the steamer "City of Chester", that has arrived from New York, on 8 April on pos. 4555N/3716W passed the steamer "Danmark" a drift with no one on board. On the afternoon the same day Reuter's Bureau reported that "Danmark" was seen without any of its life boats and with the anchor chains hanging down.

The crew of the Missouri had worked for twelve hours without food or rest, and they freely gave up all their quarters to the passengers. Passengers were made beds in the wheelhouse and the engine room. Five women and a baby were given Captain Murrell's cabin. Captain Murrell and his crew slept on the deck when they could. Because the provisions from the Missouri and from the Danmark only gave them enough food for three days, Captain Murrell knew that he had to make land as soon as possible. The Missouri's engines were strained with the load, and, right before St. Michaels was sighted, the Missouri had run out of food.

On April 10, 1889, the Missouri reached the Azores. Initially, only Captain Murrell was allowed to leave the ship. After consultation with the Danish consul and the British governor, it was agreed that 370 single men could be put ashore at St. Michaels until they could be transported to the United States. Captain Murrell was asked to take the remaining passengers to Philadelphia. Because the crew of the Missouri would have to undergo hardship conditions, Captain Murrell promised each crew member an extra month's pay. Captain Murrell purchased more provisions which were taken on board, and the Missouri sailed for Philadelphia, arriving on May 2, 1889. Upon arrival, Captain Murrell and his crew were honored for their sacrifices and bravery. Captain Murrell's employer ratified his promises to his crew for the extra wages and held him harmless for the loss and destruction of the Missouri's cargo.

The officers and crew were awarded a medal by the Citizens of Philadelphia, the reverse embossed "FOR HUMANITY AND HEROISM DISPLAYED IN RESCUING PASSINGERS AND CREW OF STEAMSHIP DANMARK IN MID OCEAN APRIL 1889"

The SS Missouri later went on to participate as a relief ship in the Russian famine of 1891–1892.
