= Wrecksite =

Online shipwreck database

- Website type: Info Database
- Founded: January 1, 2001; 25 years ago
- Headquarters: Affligem, Belgium
- Area served: Worldwide
- Owner: Adelante EBVBA
- Website: www.wrecksite.eu
- Registration: Not required; registration for greater detail and participation; some paid services
- Launched: January 1, 2001; 25 years ago
- Current status: Active

Wrecksite is a non-profit organization that documents maritime wrecks around the world and is free to use. Accessing more data requires a subscription. The website is the world's largest online nautical wreck database, and has 187,030 wrecks and 164,050 positions, 62,730 images, 2,347 maritime charts, 31,070 ship owners and builders. (As of July 13, 2019)
