= Thingvalla Line =

Shipping line

House flag of Thingvalla Line

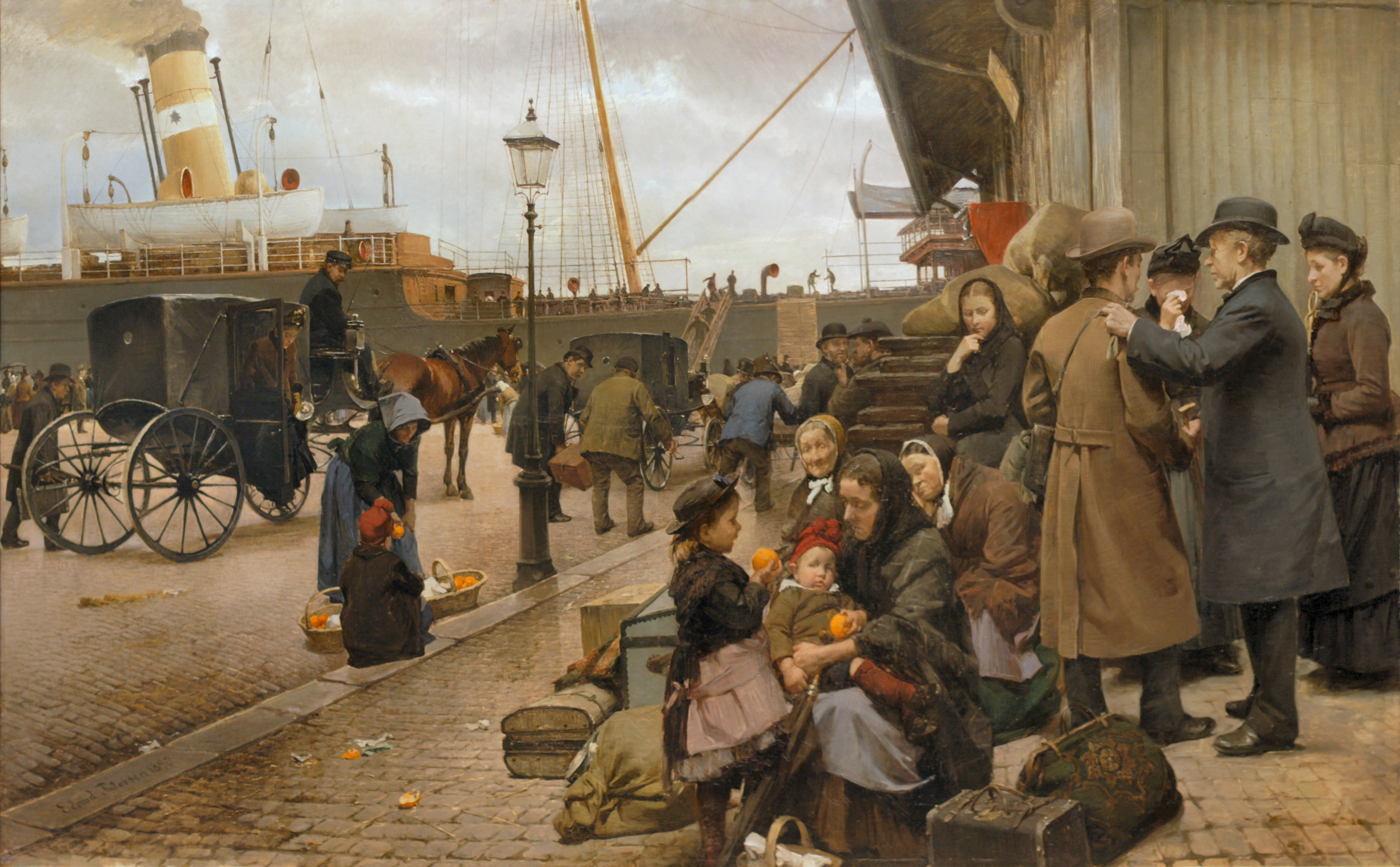
Danish emigrants waiting to board one of the Thingvalla Line's ships at Larsens Plads in Copenhagen

Thingvalla line was a shipping company founded by Danish financier, industrialist and philanthropist Carl Frederik Tietgen in 1879 in Copenhagen, Denmark. It maintained a route between Copenhagen and New York City calling at Kristiania (present day Oslo) and Kristiansand on the way. At its peak, it had ten ships in its fleet. In 1898, the company was bought by DFDS, another Danish shipping company, and the name was changed to Scandinavian America Line.

== History ==
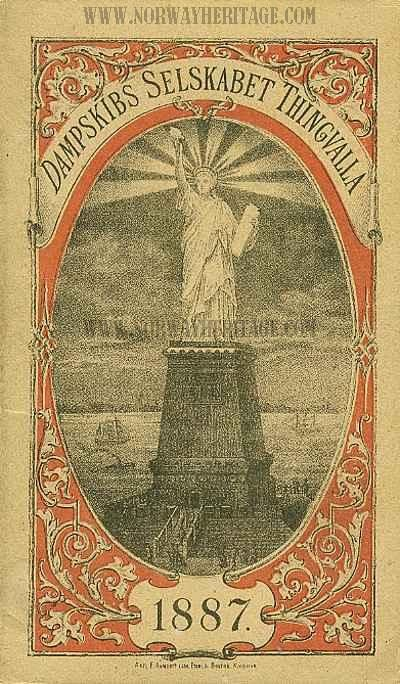
Thingvalla line brochure from 1887

Thingvalla Line was one of several large companies which were established at the initiative of Carl Frederik Tietgen. The aim of the company was to provide a direct route between Scandinavian ports and North America. Prior to its establishment, most Danish passengers had been conveyed by German shipping companies, such as Hamburg-Amerikanische Packetfahrt-Actiengesellschaft and North German Lloyd.

The new company established a ferry terminal at Larsens Plads on the Copenhagen harbourfront, a site which had been a combined shipyard and lumberyard until 1870. It was from here that its ships departed calling at Kristiania and Kristiansand before crossing the Atlantic to New York City. By including the Norwegian ports, the Thingvalla Line became an important competitor not only to the German companies, but also British based companies. In favour of the new company, apart from the obvious advantage of providing a direct route, were their Scandinavian crews and a more homogeneous composition of passengers. Less favourable was their use of smaller and slower ships as compared to the larger German and British companies. This did not seem to affect the largely Scandinavian passengers as the line soon became quite popular. What was much worse for the company was that it had a series of accidents which became a setback for the line:

- 1883: The sinking of S/S Jekla.
- 1888: The collision of the S/S Geiser and S/S Thingvalla; both of which were owned and operated by the Thingvalla Line, resulting in the sinking of S/S Geiser.
- 1889: the sinking of the S/S Danmark
- 1903: The sinking of S/S Norge.

In 1898, the company was acquired by DFDS which changed the name to Scandinavian America Line.

== See also ==
- Danish Americans
- Rescue of the SS Danmark

== Related Reading ==
- Lange, Ole (2006) Stormogulen: C.F. Tietgen, en finansmand, hans imperium og hans tid 1829-1901 (Copenhagen: Gyldendal) ISBN 87-02-05278-4
