= Copenhagen City Council =

Municipal government of Copenhagen, Denmark

Copenhagen City Council Københavns Borgerrepræsentation

Type
- Type: Municipal council

History
- Founded: 1840

Leadership
- Lord Mayor: Sisse Marie Welling, Green Left since 1 January 2026

Structure
- Seats: 55
- Political groups: Red–Green Alliance: 15 seats Social Democrats: 10 seats Conservative People's Party: 8 seats Social Liberal Party: 6 seats Green Left: 6 seats Venstre: 5 seats The Alternative: 2 seats Liberal Alliance: 1 seat New Right: 1 seat Danish People's Party: 1 seat

Elections
- Last election: 18 November 2025

Meeting place
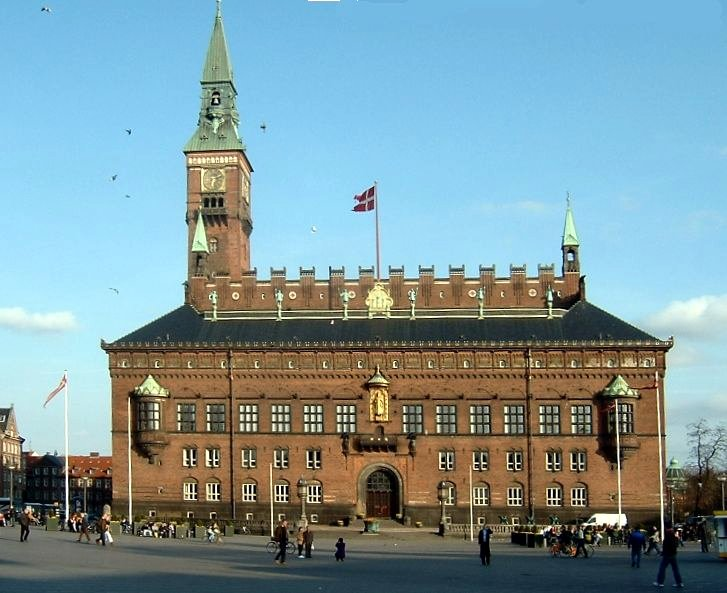
- Copenhagen City Hall, Copenhagen

Website
- https://www.kk.dk

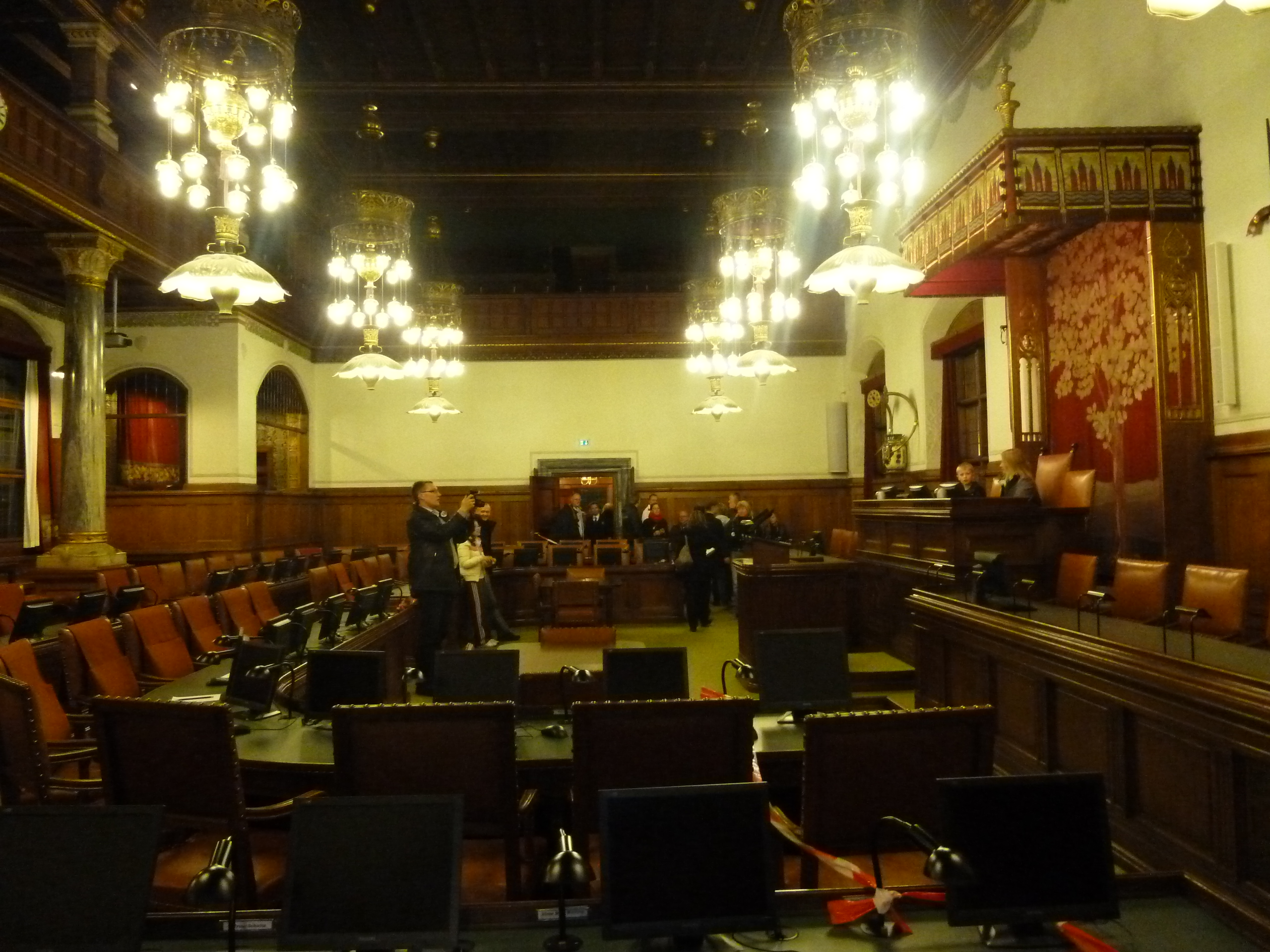
Copenhagen City Council chambers.

The Copenhagen City Council (Danish: Københavns Borgerrepræsentation) is the municipal government of Copenhagen, Denmark, and has its seat at Copenhagen City Hall.

The city council is Copenhagen's highest political authority and sets the framework for the committees' tasks. The City of Copenhagen's government consists of an economic committee and six standing committees, each working in its own field.

The city council has 55 members (abbreviated MBs), and is chaired by the lord mayor (overborgmester), who chairs the Economic Affairs Committee. The chairpersons of the six standing committees have the title of mayor (borgermester). The lord mayor, together with the six mayors and six members of the city council, make up the Economic Affairs Committee. Unlike other Danish municipalities, the City of Copenhagen does not have deputy mayors, but a first and second vice-chair of the city council.

== History ==
The forerunner of the Copenhagen City Council, the Council of 32 Men (Danish: Stadens 32 mænd), was established in 1660. The assembly primarily consisted of high-ranking citizens. In 1840, the city council was established by royal decree, consisting of 36 democratically elected members. This number was increased to 42 members in 1903. Later, in 1913, the city council was expanded to 55 members.

== Committees ==
The seven committees are:

- Economic Affairs committee (Lord Mayor Sophie Hæstorp Andersen, Social Democrats)
- Culture and Leisure Committee (Mayor Mia Nyegaard, Social Liberal Party)
- Technical and Environmental Committee (Mayor Line Barfod, Red–Green Alliance)
- Children and Youth Committee (Mayor Jakob Næsager, The Conservative People's Party)
- Social Affairs Committee (Mayor Karina Vestergård Madsen, Red–Green Alliance)
- Health and Care Committee (Mayor Sisse Marie Welling, Green Left)
- Employment and Integration Committee (Mayor Jens-Kristian Lütken, Venstre)

== Composition of the city council ==
Below are the municipal councils elected since 1909.

Election	Party																					Total seats	Elected mayor
Election	A	B	C	D	D	E	F	G	I	K	K	N	O	P	V	Y	Z	Ø	Å	Q	L	Total seats	Elected mayor
1909	20	5	16																		1	42	
1912	21	4	16																		1	42	
1913	27	5	22																		1	55	
1917	30	6	17																		2	55	
1921	33	4	16												2							55	
1925	31	6	17												1							55	
1929	35	4	16																			55	
1933	35	4	15							1												55	
1937	37	5	11							2												55	Viggo Christensen (A)
1943	32	6	15									1									1	55	Viggo Christensen (A)
1946	27	3	11							11					2						1	55	Hans Peter Sørensen (A)
1950	28	3	12			6				6												55	Hans Peter Sørensen (A)
1954	32	2	13			1				6					1							55	Hans Peter Sørensen (A)
1958	29	3	14			1				5					3							55	Sigvard Munk (A)
1962	27	2	15				9			1					1							55	Urban Hansen (A)
1966	23	2	15				13			1					1							55	Urban Hansen (A)
1970	31	5	11				5			1					1	1						55	Urban Hansen (A)
1974	22	3	6	1		1	7			7	1				1	2	3				1	55	Urban Hansen (A)
1978	26	1	8	1		1	3			5					1	5	3				1	55	Egon Weidekamp (A)
1981	22	3	8	1			7			2					2	8	2					55	Egon Weidekamp (A)
1985	18	1	9	1			15	2		1					1	7						55	Egon Weidekamp (A)
1989	20	1	6	2			13	2		1				2	2	4	2					55	Jens Kramer Mikkelsen (A)
1993	18	3	6				10	1						1	8		3	4			1	55	Jens Kramer Mikkelsen (A)
1997	17	3	5	1			8						6	1	6			7			1	55	Jens Kramer Mikkelsen (A)
2001	16	5	4	1			9						4		11			5				55	Jens Kramer Mikkelsen (A)
2005	21	7	3				7						3		8			6				55	Ritt Bjerregaard (A)
2009	17	5	4				13						4		6			6				55	Frank Jensen (A)
2013	16	6	3				6		2				4		7			11				55	Frank Jensen (A)
2017	15	5	3				5		2				3		5			11	6			55	Frank Jensen (A)
2021	10	6	8		1		6		1				1		5			15	2			55	Sophie Hæstorp Andersen (A)
2025	8	6	7				10		3				2		3			13	2	1		55	Sisse Marie Welling (F)
Election	A	B	C	D	D	E	F	G	I	K	K	N	O	P	V	Y	Z	Ø	Å	Q	L	Total seats	Elected mayor
Election	Party																					Total seats	Elected mayor
Data from Kmdvalg.dk, Dst.dk and Sa.dk

== City council chairs ==
- 1840–1840 Hans Peter Hansen
- 1841–1853 Lauritz Nicolai Hvidt (National Liberal Party)
- 1853–1858 Hans Peter Hansen (again)
- 1858–1860 Herman Andreas Mollerup
- 1860–1863 Lars Christian Larsen (National Liberal Party)
- 1863–1873 Harald Kayser (Højre [1848 party])
- 1873–1883 Christian Severin Henrichsen (Højre [1881 party])
- 1883–1885 Harald Kayser (again) (Højre)
- 1885–1895 Peter Frederik Koch (Højre)
- 1895–1898 Rasmus Strøm (Højre)
- 1898–1907 Herman Trier (from 1905: Danish Social Liberal Party)
- 1907–1909 John Vilhelm Duurloo (independent)
- 1909–1910 A. F. Lamm (Social Democrats)
- 1910–1912 Carl Becker (Antisocialistisk Borgerliste)
- 1912–1913 A. F. Lamm (again)
- 1913–1917 Christian S. Christiansen (Social Democrats)
- 1917–1919 Anthon Andersen (Social Democrats)
- 1919–1924 Thorvald Stauning (Social Democrats)
- 1924–1925 P.J. Pedersen (Social Democrats)
- 1925–1926 J. A. Hansen (Social Democrats)
- 1926–1937 Emanuel Svendsen (Social Democrats)
- 1937–1938 Julius C. Hansen (Social Democrats)
- 1938–1942 Karmark Rønsted (Social Democrats)
- 1942–1946 Alexander Fløtkjær (Social Democrats)
- 1946–1962 Sigvald Hellberg (Social Democrats)
- 1962–1970 Henry Stjernqvist (Social Democrats)
- 1970–1976 Egon Weidekamp (Social Democrats)
- 1976–1981 Gerda Louw Larsen (Social Democrats)
- 1982–1986 Knud-Erik Ziirsen (Social Democrats)
- 1986–1989 Bent Nebelong (The Conservative People's Party)
- 1990–1993 Martin Günter (Socialist People's Party)
- 1994–1997 Bodil Jensen (Social Democrats)
- Since 1998, the incumbent mayor has been the permanent chair of the city council.

== See also ==
- List of lord mayors of Copenhagen
