= 2021 Copenhagen City Council election =

- 16 November 2021

All 55 seats to the Copenhagen City Council 28 seats needed for a majority
- Turnout: 312,691 (60.0%) ▼1.9pp
	First party	Second party	Third party
	Ø	A	C
Party	Red–Green Alliance	Social Democrats	Conservatives
Last election	11 seats, 18.4%	15 seats, 27.6%	3 seats, 5.6%
Seats won	15	10	8
Seat change	▲4	▼5	▲5
Popular vote	75,698	52,874	40,172
Percentage	24.6%	17.2%	13.1%
Swing	▲6.2%	▼10.4%	▲7.5%
	Fourth party	Fifth party	Sixth party
	B	F	V
Party	Social Liberals	Green Left	Venstre
Last election	5 seats, 8.9%	5 seats, 8.3%	5 seats, 7.9%
Seats won	6	6	5
Seat change	▲1	▲1	0
Popular vote	36,688	33,824	23,578
Percentage	11.9%	11.0%	7.7%
Swing	▲3.0%	▲2.7%	▼0.2%
	Seventh party	Eighth party	Ninth party
	Å	I	D
Party	The Alternative	Liberal Alliance	New Right
Last election	6 seats, 10.5%	2 seats, 4.0%	0 seats, 1.0%
Seats won	2	1	1
Seat change	▼4	▼1	▲1
Popular vote	8,988	8,428	6,455
Percentage	2.9%	2.7%	2.1%
Swing	▼7.6%	▼1.3%	▲1.1%
- Result in each polling area
Lord Mayor before election
Lars Weiss (Note: Frank Jensen became mayor following the 2017 election, but stepped down in October 2020)
Social Democrats
Lord Mayor after election
Sophie Hæstorp Andersen
Social Democrats

Copenhagen Municipality is the largest municipality in Denmark. It has in its history been a strong area for parties of the red bloc. In the 2019 Danish general election, it became the municipality where the bloc received the highest percent of votes. It is different from other municipalities as it has a total of 7 mayor positions. The biggest and most important one is the Lord Mayor, which has been held by the Social Democrats since 1938. (Note: Green Left had also held it, but only one day - from 25 October 2004 to 26 October 2004)

In the 2017 election, the Social Democrats had won 14 seats, and had become the largest party. It had then been Frank Jensen from the party who had won the Lord Mayor's position, going into his third term.

In 2020, Jensen was accused of having sexually harassed a woman from the Social Democratic Youth of Denmark in 2012. He eventually replied in text - "I'm very sad about what happended [sic], and I want to apologize for this happening in our party. It's not an acceptable behaviour, neither then or today. On behalf of the party – sorry Maria!!!". Three days later he would step down as Lord Mayor.

Lars Weiss became acting Lord Mayor following this. He would however announce that he would not contest the 2021 election, and that he would only be the Lord Mayor until the next election. Instead Sophie Hæstorp Andersen, who was chair of the Capital Region of Denmark at the time, would be the only one standing to be the Social Democrats Lord Mayor candidate.

In November 2020, an opinion poll was released showing the Social Democrats as the largest party by a slim margin of 1.6%. The Social Democrats had previously always been the largest party in the municipality. In October 2021, Epinion released an opinion poll that had the Red–Green Alliance, who had become the largest party in Copenhagen Municipality in the 2019 Danish general election, as the largest party for the municipality election. Gallup released an opinion poll 17 days later, and four days prior to the election, that also had the Red–Green Alliance as the largest party.

In the election result, the Red–Green Alliance managed to become the largest party, with a margin of 7.4%. They gained four seats, while the Social Democrats lost five. Despite this, it proved hard for the Red–Green Alliance to actually win the Lord Mayor's position. Right-wing and centre-right parties Liberal Alliance and Venstre had said prior to the election they would be ready to support Sophie Hæstorp Andersen as the new mayor, to prevent the Red–Green Alliance from winning the position. Following the result, the leader of the Red–Green Alliance reacted with joy, saying she hoped that the party could secure the Lord Mayor's position with a green majority consisting of themselves, the Social Liberals, the Green Left and The Alternative. Eventually however, it was announced that Sophie Hæstorp Andersen would be the new mayor. Line Barfod from the Red–Green Alliance joined the agreement, citing that the Social Liberals would not support her, and that the Social Democrats would rather work with the right-wing parties than support her. To prevent the former from happening, she decided that the Red–Green Alliance should be a part of the agreement making Sophie Hæstorp Andersen the new mayor. In return, the Red–Green Alliance would get 2 of the 6 minor mayor positions.

== Electoral system ==
For elections to Danish municipalities, a number varying from 9 to 31 are chosen to be elected to the municipal council. However Copenhagen Municipality has, as the only municipality, a city council instead of a municipal council. In the city council 55 seats are contested.

The seats are then allocated using the D'Hondt method and a closed list proportional representation.

Unlike in Danish general elections, in elections to city councils, electoral alliances are allowed.

== Electoral alliances ==
=== Electoral Alliance 1 ===
Party		Political alignment
A	Social Democrats	Centre-left
B	Social Liberals	Centre to Centre-left

=== Electoral Alliance 2 ===
Party		Political alignment
C	Conservatives	Centre-right
I	Liberal Alliance	Centre-right to Right-wing
K	Christian Democrats	Centre to Centre-right
O	Danish People's Party	Right-wing to Far-right
V	Venstre	Centre-right
Ë	Det Demokratiske Parti	Local politics

=== Electoral Alliance 3 ===
Party		Political alignment
P	Copenhagen	Local politics
Y	Kærlighedspartiet (Regnbuefolket / Befri Christiania)	Local politics

=== Electoral Alliance 4 ===
Party		Political alignment
G	Vegan Party	Single-issue
H	Grøn Omstilling	Local politics
U	Klimapartiet Momentum	Local politics
Å	The Alternative	Centre-left to Left-wing

=== Electoral Alliance 5 ===
Party		Political alignment
E	Christania-Listen	Local politics
F	Green Left	Centre-left to Left-wing
J	Hampepartiet	Single-issue
N	Kommunisterne	Far-Left
R	Kommunistisk Parti	Far-Left
Z	Rolig Revolution	Local politics
Æ	Freedom List	Right-wing to Far-right
Ø	Red–Green Alliance	Left-wing to Far-Left

== Results by polling station ==
Polling Station	A	B	C	D	F	G	I	K	O	V	Ø	Å	Others
Polling Station	%	%	%	%	%	%	%	%	%	%	%	%	%
1. Østerbro	16.1	13.5	19.6	1.8	10.4	0.5	3.4	0.4	1.4	8.9	18.6	2.6	2.8
1. Nord	15.8	12.0	21.8	2.3	9.0	0.2	3.8	0.4	2.0	11.6	15.7	2.3	3.2
1. Syd	15.6	14.0	18.4	1.6	10.8	0.4	2.8	0.4	1.0	8.4	21.1	2.4	3.1
1. Vest	18.5	11.8	15.1	2.3	10.8	0.7	2.6	0.7	2.0	7.8	21.3	2.5	3.9
1. Nordvest	18.5	13.0	16.5	2.4	10.6	0.8	3.2	0.3	1.9	8.4	18.5	2.5	3.4
1. Øst	13.0	13.0	23.1	2.2	8.2	0.4	5.7	0.3	1.0	13.8	14.0	2.3	2.8
2. Sundbyvester	22.1	9.1	9.5	3.1	10.2	0.5	2.2	0.4	4.0	6.7	25.5	2.7	3.9
2. Nord	16.3	12.2	10.8	2.2	10.6	0.4	2.1	0.5	2.2	6.7	28.7	3.2	4.0
2. Syd	14.8	12.7	13.8	2.8	9.8	0.9	4.4	0.4	1.5	13.7	17.7	2.9	4.6
2. Vest	14.2	11.6	16.6	2.4	9.5	0.4	3.4	0.2	1.3	11.9	21.8	3.1	3.5
2. Øst	16.6	11.4	9.4	2.5	11.6	0.5	2.7	0.5	2.9	7.0	28.0	3.6	3.3
3. Indre By	11.9	13.4	19.0	2.0	8.7	0.7	4.1	0.2	0.9	8.4	23.7	3.0	4.0
3. Nord	13.1	13.5	22.9	1.6	8.8	0.6	3.4	0.4	1.4	10.0	19.3	2.3	2.7
3. Syd	14.8	10.0	11.3	1.8	8.6	0.7	2.4	0.3	1.2	6.1	33.4	4.4	5.1
3. Øst	12.9	12.1	23.4	2.3	8.6	0.5	4.8	0.2	1.0	11.2	17.8	2.2	3.0
4. Sundbyøster	17.1	11.4	12.2	2.8	11.3	0.8	3.2	0.3	2.9	8.7	22.6	3.0	3.6
4. Nord	17.0	11.2	10.7	2.1	11.6	0.7	2.8	0.4	2.7	6.6	26.2	3.5	4.4
4. Syd	20.7	9.3	11.9	2.7	12.1	0.4	2.1	0.5	3.2	7.3	23.3	2.8	3.6
4. Øst	19.8	11.0	13.8	2.6	13.5	0.5	2.7	0.4	2.5	8.9	19.0	2.7	2.4
5. Nørrebro	14.4	11.6	6.3	0.9	12.9	1.0	1.0	0.6	1.3	4.5	36.8	4.0	4.8
5. Nord	12.5	14.6	8.0	1.1	12.9	0.7	2.2	0.4	1.0	6.0	31.8	3.7	5.3
5. Syd	12.7	12.9	9.3	1.2	10.1	0.6	1.3	0.4	1.4	5.0	37.5	3.0	4.7
5. Øst	12.0	14.6	10.3	0.9	10.9	0.6	2.5	0.2	0.7	6.4	32.3	4.3	4.4
5. Vest	14.7	11.6	8.5	1.1	13.1	0.8	1.6	0.2	1.3	5.5	34.5	3.4	3.6
5. Nordvest	10.8	14.2	6.4	1.0	13.9	0.6	1.5	0.2	0.9	4.5	37.2	4.0	4.8
5. Nørrebrohallen	12.8	13.3	5.9	1.0	13.0	0.8	1.9	0.3	1.1	4.7	36.4	4.0	4.8
6. Bispebjerg	14.7	12.3	7.1	2.0	11.6	0.8	1.9	0.4	2.1	5.1	33.2	3.9	4.9
6. Nord	24.3	9.4	10.6	2.4	11.0	1.0	1.6	0.8	3.0	5.8	24.3	2.0	3.9
6. Øst	27.0	9.4	10.5	3.4	11.4	0.6	2.4	0.4	3.2	5.3	20.6	1.9	3.9
6. Syd	16.0	12.3	6.8	1.9	11.3	0.6	2.1	0.4	1.7	5.2	33.4	3.6	4.7
6. Vest	18.9	10.8	8.0	2.5	11.8	0.8	1.0	0.6	2.5	4.6	30.8	2.6	5.1
7. Brønshøj	25.3	9.2	16.2	2.3	11.8	0.7	2.1	0.4	2.6	5.3	19.5	1.9	2.7
7. Nord	23.8	12.2	5.3	1.7	10.8	0.4	0.7	0.6	3.1	2.0	33.4	1.4	4.8
7. Rødkilde	21.1	11.6	13.1	2.8	11.9	0.6	2.4	0.6	2.5	7.2	20.8	2.4	3.0
7. Øst	25.8	9.4	11.5	1.9	12.4	0.6	1.4	0.4	2.6	4.4	24.8	1.9	2.9
7. Vest	29.9	8.4	12.0	2.1	10.5	0.4	1.5	0.5	4.8	4.5	20.9	1.2	3.2
7. Nordvest	30.3	7.9	15.2	2.9	11.2	0.4	1.2	0.5	3.6	4.8	17.3	1.5	3.0
7. Katrinedal	21.2	11.4	14.4	2.8	11.2	0.4	3.0	0.3	2.0	8.7	19.4	2.7	2.5
7. Kirkebjerg	22.5	11.0	14.6	2.8	12.0	0.4	2.3	0.5	2.4	7.4	19.5	2.0	2.7
7. Vanløse	22.2	10.6	14.8	2.6	11.1	0.6	3.0	0.7	2.9	8.2	18.9	1.5	3.0
8. Valby	20.2	11.1	14.0	3.1	13.1	0.4	2.7	0.3	2.0	8.8	18.6	2.6	3.1
8. Nord	20.0	12.1	13.8	2.0	12.0	0.6	2.6	0.5	2.0	8.8	20.2	2.7	2.8
8. Syd	22.3	12.0	13.6	2.6	10.8	0.5	3.2	0.3	2.4	9.8	16.9	2.3	3.2
8. Vest	24.4	9.6	12.2	3.2	11.7	0.8	2.2	0.8	4.3	7.7	17.2	2.2	3.7
8. Sydøst	21.8	11.2	9.9	3.0	11.2	0.5	2.7	0.4	2.2	7.3	22.9	2.5	4.4
8. Midt	18.5	12.3	14.7	2.5	11.2	0.5	3.5	0.5	2.1	9.0	19.4	2.3	3.6
9. Vesterbro	14.6	11.6	9.4	1.0	13.5	0.6	1.8	0.1	1.2	5.1	33.1	4.4	3.7
9. Nord	13.0	14.3	10.8	1.3	12.2	0.4	2.4	0.2	0.8	6.2	30.3	4.0	4.0
9. Syd	20.9	6.8	5.7	3.4	9.0	0.6	1.7	0.4	3.6	4.3	34.1	2.9	6.6
9. Øst	13.0	13.1	11.3	1.2	12.0	0.8	2.6	0.4	0.9	7.5	29.0	4.5	3.6
9. Vest	14.5	14.3	12.1	1.2	11.7	0.4	2.8	0.3	1.1	7.2	27.2	3.3	3.9
9. Midt	14.8	11.0	7.0	2.3	12.2	0.7	2.6	0.4	1.7	6.7	31.9	3.6	5.1
9. Sydhavn	13.7	15.6	18.9	2.1	8.0	0.7	5.8	0.2	0.9	13.9	14.7	2.8	2.6

== Results ==

Party		Votes	%	+/-	Seats	+/-
Københavns Municipality
Ø	Red-Green Alliance	75,698	24.64	+6.24	15	+4
A	Social Democrats	52,874	17.21	-10.37	10	-5
C	Conservatives	40,172	13.08	+7.48	8	+5
B	Social Liberals	36,688	11.94	+3.04	6	+1
F	Green Left	33,824	11.01	+2.74	6	+1
V	Venstre	23,578	7.68	-0.20	5	0
Å	The Alternative	8,988	2.93	-7.58	2	-4
I	Liberal Alliance	8,428	2.74	-1.19	1	-1
D	New Right	6,455	2.10	+1.14	1	+1
O	Danish People's Party	5,907	1.92	-3.10	1	-2
U	Klimapartiet Momentum	2,967	0.97	New	0	New
G	Vegan Party	1,839	0.60	New	0	New
M	Danmark for Alle	1,426	0.46	New	0	New
L	Københavnerlisten	1,381	0.45	New	0	New
R	Kommunistisk Parti	1,235	0.40	New	0	New
K	Christian Democrats	1,187	0.39	+0.13	0	0
T	Freedom List	1,134	0.37	New	0	New
J	Hampepartiet	573	0.19	-0.02	0	0
Y	Kærlighedspartiet (Regnbuefolket / Befri Christiania)	490	0.16	-0.03	0	0
Z	Rolig Revolution	445	0.14	New	0	New
Q	Feministisk Initiativ	405	0.13	-0.55	0	0
Æ	Bæredygtigt samfund	366	0.12	New	0	New
N	Kommunisterne	352	0.11	New	0	New
E	Christiania-Listen	325	0.11	-0.20	0	0
H	Grøn Omstilling	233	0.08	New	0	New
P	Copenhagen	76	0.02	New	0	New
Total		307,046	100	N/A	55	N/A
Invalid votes		970	0.19	-0.07		
Blank votes		4,531	0.87	+0.10		
Turnout		312,547	59.95	-1.90		
Source: valg.dk

== Aftermath ==
The Lord Mayor and the six other committee chairs are elected proportionally, among the 55 councilors. The position of mayor goes to the electoral group with the most seats.

Mayoral election
Ballot →	3 December 2021	Elected committee chairs	Portifolio
A (10); C (8); B (6); V (5); I (1); O (1)	31 / 55	Sophie Hæstorp Andersen (A)	Lord Mayor (Economy)
A (10); C (8); B (6); V (5); I (1); O (1)	31 / 55	Jakob Næsager (C)	Children and Youth
A (10); C (8); B (6); V (5); I (1); O (1)	31 / 55	Mia Nyegaard (B)	Culture and Leisure
A (10); C (8); B (6); V (5); I (1); O (1)	31 / 55	Cecilia Lonning-Skovgaard (V)	Employment and Integration
Ø (15); F (6); Å (2)	23 / 55	Line Barfod (Ø)	Technical and Environmental
Ø (15); F (6); Å (2)	23 / 55	Sisse Marie Welling (F)	Health and Care
Ø (15); F (6); Å (2)	23 / 55	Karina Vestergård Madsen (Ø)	Social Services
D (1)	1 / 55	—	
