= 2025 Copenhagen city council election =

Municipal election in Denmark

- 18 November 2025

All 55 seats to the Copenhagen Municipal Council 28 seats needed for a majority
- Turnout: 354,787 (65.6%) ▲5.6%
	First party	Second party	Third party
	Ø	F	A
Party	Red-Green Alliance	Green Left	Social Democrats
Last election	15 seats, 24.6%	6 seats, 11.0%	10 seats, 17.2%
Seats won	13	10	8
Seat change	▼2	▲4	▼2
Popular vote	76,955	62,453	44,361
Percentage	22.0%	17.9%	12.7%
Swing	▼2.6%	▲6.9%	▼4.5%
	Fourth party	Fifth party	Sixth party
	C	B	V
Party	Conservatives	Social Liberals	Venstre
Last election	8 seats, 13.1%	6 seats, 11.9%	5 seats, 7.7%
Seats won	7	6	3
Seat change	▼1	0	▼2
Popular vote	39,663	36,718	21,288
Percentage	11.4%	10.5%	6.1%
Swing	▼1.7%	▼1.4%	▼1.6%
	Seventh party	Eighth party	Ninth party
	I	Å	O
Party	Liberal Alliance	The Alternative	Danish People's Party
Last election	1 seat, 2.7%	2 seats, 2.9%	1 seat, 1.9%
Seats won	3	2	2
Seat change	▲2	0	▲1
Popular vote	18,189	17,264	13,383
Percentage	5.2%	4.9%	3.8%
Swing	▲2.5%	▲2.0%	▲1.9%
Mayor before election
Lars Weiss
Social Democrats
Mayor after election
Sisse Marie Welling
Green Left

The 2025 Copenhagen municipal election was held on November 18, 2025, to elect the 55 members to sit in the regional council for the Copenhagen municipal council, in the period of 2026 to 2029. Following the election, Sisse Marie Welling from the Green Left became mayor.

== Background ==
In the 2021 election, Sophie Hæstorp Andersen from the Social Democrats became mayor for her first term, despite the Social Democrats failing to become the largest party for the first time in more than a hundred years. Instead, the Red–Green Alliance won the most seats, but failed to win the Lord mayor position.

Lord mayor Hæstorp Andersen, stepped down from the position which was revealed on August 29, 2024, and instead became Minister of Social Affairs. Pernille Rosenkrantz-Theil was later revealed to become the leading candidate from the Social Democrats for this election.

== Electoral system ==
For elections to Danish municipalities, a number varying from 9 to 31 are chosen to be elected to the municipal council. However Copenhagen Municipality has, as the only municipality, a city council instead of a municipal council. In the city council 55 seats are contested.

The seats are then allocated using the D'Hondt method and a closed list proportional representation.

Unlike in Danish General Elections, in elections to city councils, electoral alliances are allowed.

== Electoral alliances ==
=== Electoral Alliance 1 ===
Party		Political alignment
A	Social Democrats	Centre-left
B	Social Liberals	Centre to Centre-left
M	Moderates	Centre to Centre-right

=== Electoral Alliance 2 ===
Party		Political alignment
C	Conservatives	Centre-right
D	New Right	Far-right
I	Liberal Alliance	Centre-right to Right-wing
K	Christian Democrats	Centre to Centre-right
O	Danish People's Party	Right-wing to Far-right
V	Venstre	Centre-right
Æ	Denmark Democrats	Right-wing to Far-right

=== Electoral Alliance 3 ===
Party		Political alignment
E	KaosTV	Local politics
J	Hampepartiet	Cannabis legalisation
P	DKP - Kommunisterne	Far-Left
Q	Independent Greens	Left-wing
R	Kommunistisk Parti	Far-Left
T	Skamløse Demokrater	Local politics
Z	Solidarisk Integritet	Local politics

=== Electoral Alliance 4 ===
Party		Political alignment
F	Green Left	Centre-left to Left-wing
N	Demokraterne - hele Danmark skal leve	Local politics
Ø	Red-Green Alliance	Left-wing to Far-Left
Å	The Alternative	Centre-left to Left-wing

== Results by polling station ==
Division	A	B	C	D	F	I	K	M	N	O	Q	R	T	V	Æ	Ø	Å	Others
Division	%	%	%	%	%	%	%	%	%	%	%	%	%	%	%	%	%	%
Idrætshuset	15.6	11.6	18.2	0.0	16.8	5.1	0.2	1.5	0.0	2.7	0.6	0.2	0.1	7.4	0.4	16.0	3.3	0.3
Strandvejsskolen	13.3	10.3	20.1	0.1	15.1	6.7	0.3	1.7	0.1	4.4	0.6	0.1	0.2	8.9	0.4	13.7	3.6	0.3
Remisen	13.1	12.1	15.7	0.0	18.7	4.8	0.3	1.3	0.1	2.8	0.6	0.2	0.2	7.0	0.3	18.1	4.5	0.2
Nørre Fælled Skole	14.2	10.0	14.6	0.1	17.9	4.9	0.2	1.1	0.1	4.1	1.0	0.2	0.3	6.8	0.5	18.6	4.8	0.6
Kildevældsskolen	13.9	11.5	15.0	0.1	16.0	5.3	0.3	1.6	0.2	4.3	1.1	0.2	0.3	6.6	0.6	18.3	4.4	0.4
Sundby Idrætspark	16.7	7.9	9.3	0.1	18.0	4.8	0.3	1.3	0.2	6.6	3.3	0.6	0.2	5.3	1.1	19.5	4.2	0.6
Amager Fælled Skole	14.2	10.5	10.2	0.0	18.1	4.7	0.3	1.6	0.1	3.6	2.5	0.3	0.4	5.9	0.6	21.6	4.9	0.5
Ørestad Gymnasium	12.6	10.4	10.0	0.1	15.0	7.9	0.2	2.1	0.0	4.6	1.9	0.3	0.4	8.7	0.7	18.9	5.8	0.5
Skolen på Islands Brygge	13.1	11.2	14.6	0.1	18.3	7.0	0.2	1.8	0.1	3.0	0.7	0.2	0.2	9.1	0.4	15.5	4.3	0.4
Rådhushallen	10.5	11.5	14.3	0.1	16.6	6.4	0.1	1.7	0.1	2.6	0.9	0.4	0.2	6.2	0.4	22.2	5.5	0.3
Øster Farimagsgades Skole	12.1	11.3	21.8	0.1	14.3	5.8	0.2	1.8	0.1	2.3	0.4	0.3	0.1	9.4	0.4	15.5	4.0	0.3
Hal C	12.1	10.5	11.1	0.1	17.2	4.6	0.2	1.6	0.1	2.4	0.7	0.3	0.3	5.0	0.4	25.5	6.9	0.8
Nyboder Skole	11.9	9.8	23.2	0.1	12.5	8.3	0.2	1.9	0.1	3.5	0.6	0.1	0.1	9.8	0.3	13.7	3.5	0.3
Lergravsparkens Skole	15.5	9.4	8.5	0.1	18.8	4.8	0.2	1.3	0.2	6.2	1.7	0.3	0.4	5.5	1.0	20.6	4.9	0.7
Skolen på Amagerbro	12.2	10.0	9.0	0.2	18.0	5.2	0.2	1.7	0.1	5.0	1.4	0.2	0.2	6.0	0.7	23.5	5.8	0.6
Gerbrandskolen	16.7	8.3	10.4	0.1	20.1	5.1	0.2	1.6	0.2	6.2	0.9	0.3	0.2	6.9	1.0	17.3	4.2	0.4
Skolen ved Sundet	14.4	10.0	12.8	0.0	22.1	5.9	0.2	1.8	0.1	4.0	0.7	0.2	0.2	7.5	0.6	15.4	3.9	0.3
Guldberg Skole	10.8	8.6	6.4	0.1	19.6	2.4	0.3	1.0	0.1	2.6	2.8	0.5	0.2	3.3	0.5	33.1	7.0	0.7
Rådmandsgades Skole	7.5	12.5	6.4	0.0	18.0	4.0	0.2	1.7	0.1	1.9	2.3	0.6	0.4	4.5	0.3	31.4	8.0	0.5
Korsgadehallen	9.9	9.5	8.4	0.0	15.0	2.8	0.2	1.3	0.1	2.2	4.1	0.6	0.2	4.3	0.4	34.5	5.1	1.4
Plejecentret Sølund	9.5	12.7	9.3	0.0	18.1	4.5	0.1	1.7	0.1	1.7	0.9	0.3	0.3	4.6	0.4	29.3	6.2	0.4
Nørrebro Park Skole	11.1	10.4	7.8	0.0	19.7	3.1	0.2	1.2	0.1	2.6	2.1	0.5	0.3	4.3	0.2	30.7	5.3	0.5
Frederiksgård Skole	7.5	11.4	5.4	0.0	19.7	2.8	0.1	1.0	0.0	2.0	1.9	0.6	0.3	3.7	0.2	35.1	7.6	0.5
Tagensbo Skole	8.4	9.4	5.5	0.0	17.4	3.5	0.3	1.2	0.0	3.9	3.3	0.9	0.4	3.4	0.5	34.3	7.0	0.5
Holbergskolen	16.6	8.0	8.2	0.1	17.7	3.6	0.2	1.1	0.1	5.2	2.7	0.4	0.2	4.3	0.9	25.2	4.9	0.6
Lundehusskolen	18.9	8.3	9.4	0.1	16.6	4.1	0.2	1.0	0.3	6.1	3.0	0.4	0.4	4.3	0.5	22.2	3.3	0.8
Grøndalsvængets Skole	10.0	9.1	5.3	0.1	18.0	2.9	0.4	1.1	0.0	4.2	3.5	0.5	0.4	3.7	0.4	33.0	6.9	0.5
Tingbjerg Skole	11.4	13.1	2.9	0.0	10.4	1.4	0.3	0.5	0.1	3.4	20.1	0.4	0.3	1.7	0.4	30.4	2.0	1.1
Rødkilde Skole	14.9	9.9	12.4	0.1	20.2	4.4	0.2	1.4	0.1	5.0	1.2	0.2	0.4	5.3	0.5	19.7	3.9	0.5
Bellahøj Skole	15.9	9.5	9.3	0.0	21.6	3.0	0.2	1.5	0.1	4.4	2.5	0.2	0.3	3.8	0.5	22.7	3.7	0.6
EnergiCenter Voldparken	17.3	9.4	9.0	0.0	16.8	2.8	0.3	1.2	0.1	6.1	6.6	0.5	0.4	3.3	0.8	21.9	2.9	0.5
Husum Skole	19.8	8.3	10.8	0.1	19.5	3.3	0.3	1.1	0.1	6.3	3.7	0.2	0.2	3.8	0.8	18.2	3.0	0.5
Kirkebjerg Skole	14.7	9.4	13.1	0.0	21.1	4.9	0.3	1.2	0.1	5.0	0.9	0.2	0.3	6.2	0.7	17.6	4.0	0.4
Vanløsehallerne	15.9	8.8	12.8	0.1	19.8	5.1	0.4	1.3	0.1	4.9	1.3	0.2	0.2	6.9	0.9	17.7	3.2	0.4
Ålholm Skole	15.3	10.7	12.3	0.1	19.2	6.0	0.2	1.1	0.2	4.9	1.2	0.2	0.3	5.6	0.6	17.7	4.1	0.4
Prøvehallen	13.2	10.1	12.8	0.1	19.9	5.5	0.2	1.5	0.1	4.2	0.8	0.3	0.2	6.2	0.6	19.0	4.8	0.5
Kirsebærhavens Skole	15.0	11.5	7.6	0.1	17.9	7.0	0.2	1.8	0.0	4.8	2.9	0.4	0.3	6.8	0.5	17.8	4.6	0.5
Lykkebo Hallen	17.9	9.0	10.0	0.1	18.2	4.7	0.4	1.4	0.1	7.2	3.1	0.3	0.4	5.8	1.3	16.5	3.3	0.5
Sankt Annæ Gymnasium	14.3	9.9	8.0	0.1	16.4	4.8	0.3	1.2	0.1	5.4	3.5	0.2	0.4	5.5	1.1	24.0	4.3	0.6
Vigerslev Allés Skole	14.2	10.3	10.9	0.1	18.9	6.4	0.2	1.6	0.1	4.3	1.2	0.3	0.2	7.2	0.5	18.3	4.9	0.2
Tove Ditlevsens Skole	10.7	11.6	9.6	0.0	20.4	3.9	0.2	1.2	0.0	2.1	1.6	0.2	0.3	4.4	0.3	28.1	4.9	0.4
Oehlenschlægersgades Skole	9.8	12.9	10.9	0.0	19.6	4.9	0.1	1.6	0.1	2.0	1.2	0.1	0.3	4.9	0.3	25.2	5.6	0.6
Ellebjerg Skole	12.1	7.0	6.7	0.2	17.3	3.6	0.4	1.1	0.2	6.2	2.2	1.6	0.5	3.5	1.1	29.5	6.3	0.6
Skolen ved Dybbølsbro	9.1	11.6	9.9	0.1	19.6	5.2	0.2	1.7	0.0	1.9	1.2	0.3	0.4	5.9	0.3	26.8	5.6	0.3
Vesterbro Ny Skole	11.2	14.7	11.6	0.1	17.4	6.7	0.1	1.7	0.1	2.5	1.5	0.2	0.3	7.0	0.2	19.7	4.7	0.3
Bavnehøjhallen	11.4	8.5	5.5	0.1	18.0	4.1	0.2	1.3	0.1	4.7	2.7	0.8	0.4	3.8	0.8	30.1	6.5	1.0
Skolen i Sydhavnen	10.5	12.4	15.4	0.1	15.8	10.5	0.2	2.7	0.0	2.7	1.0	0.2	0.3	9.0	0.3	14.0	4.6	0.2
Skolen på Strandboulevarden	11.5	11.9	20.3	0.1	15.5	6.9	0.2	2.2	0.1	2.9	0.3	0.1	0.1	9.4	0.6	13.8	3.8	0.3
Dyvekeskolen	13.4	10.1	8.0	0.1	20.3	4.4	0.3	1.3	0.1	4.1	3.4	0.4	0.3	5.4	0.8	21.5	5.6	0.5
Nørrebrohallen	7.9	11.1	4.7	0.1	17.7	3.4	0.2	1.0	0.0	2.1	4.5	0.4	0.3	3.7	0.4	35.3	6.8	0.5
Utterslev Skole	11.1	8.9	6.3	0.2	17.9	2.5	0.1	0.9	0.2	4.3	6.5	0.5	0.4	3.2	0.5	30.4	5.5	0.6
Østerbrohuset	11.1	13.0	18.5	0.1	13.7	10.6	0.1	2.1	0.1	2.8	0.4	0.1	0.2	10.8	0.3	12.1	3.6	0.3
Peder Lykke Skolen	12.2	11.5	9.7	0.0	17.8	7.9	0.3	2.0	0.1	3.8	1.7	0.3	0.4	10.6	0.7	16.0	4.7	0.4
Kalvebod Fælled Skole	12.3	10.0	7.8	0.2	17.7	4.4	0.3	1.7	0.1	5.0	3.3	0.3	0.4	5.5	0.7	24.2	5.7	0.5
Den Classenske Legatskole	9.1	11.3	19.2	0.2	13.4	9.8	0.2	2.1	0.1	3.3	0.7	0.3	0.3	8.3	0.4	15.4	5.7	0.2
Sølvgades Skole	12.2	10.2	20.7	0.1	13.5	7.3	0.3	2.1	0.0	2.6	0.4	0.0	0.3	8.5	0.3	16.6	4.0	0.6
Nordøstamager Skole	13.6	10.6	10.8	0.1	19.0	6.3	0.1	1.8	0.0	4.3	1.1	0.2	0.3	7.1	0.7	18.3	5.4	0.3
Sluseholmen Skole	10.0	11.9	13.3	0.1	14.7	7.9	0.2	2.3	0.1	3.2	0.9	0.7	0.2	8.3	0.7	20.7	4.7	0.2

== Results ==

Party		Votes	%	+/-	Seats	+/-
København Municipality
Ø	Red-Green Alliance	76,955	22.03	-2.62	13	-2
F	Green Left	62,453	17.87	+6.86	10	+4
A	Social Democrats	44,361	12.70	-4.52	8	-2
C	Conservatives	39,663	11.35	-1.73	7	-1
B	Social Liberals	36,718	10.51	-1.43	6	0
V	Venstre	21,288	6.09	-1.58	3	-2
I	Liberal Alliance	18,189	5.21	+2.46	3	+2
Å	The Alternative	17,264	4.94	+2.02	2	0
O	Danish People's Party	13,383	3.83	+1.91	2	+1
Q	Independent Greens	6,798	1.95	New	1	New
M	Moderates	5,271	1.51	New	0	New
Æ	Denmark Democrats	1,902	0.54	New	0	New
R	Kommunistisk Parti	1,127	0.32	-0.08	0	0
T	Skamløse Demokrater	997	0.29	New	0	New
K	Christian Democrats	772	0.22	-0.17	0	0
J	Hampepartiet	526	0.10	-0.09	0	0
P	DKP - Kommunisterne	383	0.07	New	0	New
N	Demokraterne - hele Danmark skal leve	317	0.09	New	0	New
D	New Right	262	0.07	-2.03	0	-1
L	Lokallisten - København	238	0.04	New	0	New
Y	Fælles Fremtid	215	0.04	New	0	New
U	Din stemme i København	109	0.02	New	0	New
E	KaosTV	105	0.02	New	0	New
Z	Solidarisk Integritet	101	0.02	New	0	New
Total		349,397	100	N/A	55	N/A
Invalid votes		995	0.18	0.0		
Blank votes		4,610	0.85	+0.05		
Turnout		355,002	65.58	+5.61		
Source: valg.dk

== Aftermath ==
The Lord Mayor and the six other committee chairs are elected proportionally, among the 55 councilors. The position of mayor goes to the electoral group with the most seats.

Mayoral election
Ballot →	5 December 2025	Elected committee chairs	Portifolio
Ø (13); F (10); C (7); B (6); V (3); I (3); Å (2); O (2)	46 / 55	Sisse Marie Welling (F)	Lord Mayor (Economy)
Ø (13); F (10); C (7); B (6); V (3); I (3); Å (2); O (2)	46 / 55	Line Barfod (Ø)	Climate, Environmental, and Technical
Ø (13); F (10); C (7); B (6); V (3); I (3); Å (2); O (2)	46 / 55	Jakob Næsager (C)	Children and Youth
Ø (13); F (10); C (7); B (6); V (3); I (3); Å (2); O (2)	46 / 55	Karina Vestergård Madsen (Ø)	Social Services
Ø (13); F (10); C (7); B (6); V (3); I (3); Å (2); O (2)	46 / 55	Christopher Røhl (B)	Culture and Leisure
Ø (13); F (10); C (7); B (6); V (3); I (3); Å (2); O (2)	46 / 55	Jens-Kristian Lütken (V)	Health and Care
A (8)	8 / 55	Andreas Keil (A)	Employment, Integration, and Business
Q (1)	1 / 55	—	

== Opinion polls ==
Polling firm	Fieldwork date	Sample size	Ø	A	C	B	F	V	Å	I	D	O	R	K	M	Q	Æ	Others	Lead
Epinion	13 Nov - 17 Nov 2025	1272	24.4	12.0	9.6	8.1	20.2	6.5	3.8	5.7	–	4.7	–	–	1.7	0.8	0.6	1.1	4.2
Epinion	9 Oct - 20 Oct 2025	2457	24.8	12.2	8.2	7.9	21.0	5.1	3.8	6.9	–	5.1	0.5	–	1.5	0.8	1.1	1.1	3.8
Norstat		2072	21.9	16.9	10.9	8.9	17.0	5.4	2.3	6.9	0.2	3.5	–	–	1.9	–	1.8	1.9	4.9
Epinion	4 Sep - 13 Oct 2025	614	27.0	10.4	8.3	7.6	21.5	5.5	5.1	7.4	–	4.2	–	–	0.5	–	1.1	1.2	5.5
Norstat			20.5	17.4	10.3	9.0	17.2	5.5	–	8.1	–	–	–	0.4	–	–	–		3.1
Wilke			22.3	13.6	10.3	6.8	21.0	5.3	3.9	9.3	–	3.8	–	–	1.2	–	2.0		1.3
Epinion	16 Aug - 4 Sep 2025		24.0	12.0	7.0	8.0	21.0	3.0	4.0	9.0	0.0	–	–	–	–	–	–		3.0
2024 european parliament election	9 Jun 2024		18.5	9.7	6.2	11.8	27.7	6.3	5.6	5.8	3.0	–	–	–	4.4	–	1.1	–	9.2
2022 general election	1 Nov 2022		15.2	17.7	4.3	7.8	12.0	7.8	10.4	8.3	1.4	1.5	0.2	–	9.2	2.5	1.5	–	2.5
2021 regional election	16 Nov 2021		21.8	17.8	15.8	13.5	11.0	8.3	1.6	2.2	2.2	2.1	0.4	–	–	–	–	–	4.0
2021 city council election	16 Nov 2021		24.6 (15)	17.2 (10)	13.1 (8)	11.9 (6)	11.0 (6)	7.7 (5)	2.9 (2)	2.7 (1)	2.1 (1)	1.9 (1)	0.3 (0)	0.4 (0)	–	–	–	–	7.4
