= Hellen Hedemann =

Danish politician and lawyer (born 1953)

Hellen Hedemann (born 25 May 1953, in Tranebjerg) is a Danish politician and lawyer, who served as Lord Mayor of Copenhagen for two days from 25 October to 26 October 2004. In doing so, she became the Lord Mayor of Copenhagen from the Socialist People's Party, and controversially, the city's first female Lord Mayor. In 2005, the fact that her name was omitted from the official list of Lord Mayors of Copenhagen located in the antechamber of the Copenhagen City Hall drew criticism. She was also a member and deputy chairwoman of the Copenhagen City Council from 1998 to 2005.
