= List of lord mayors of Copenhagen =

Lord mayor of Copenhagen
- Københavns Overborgmester
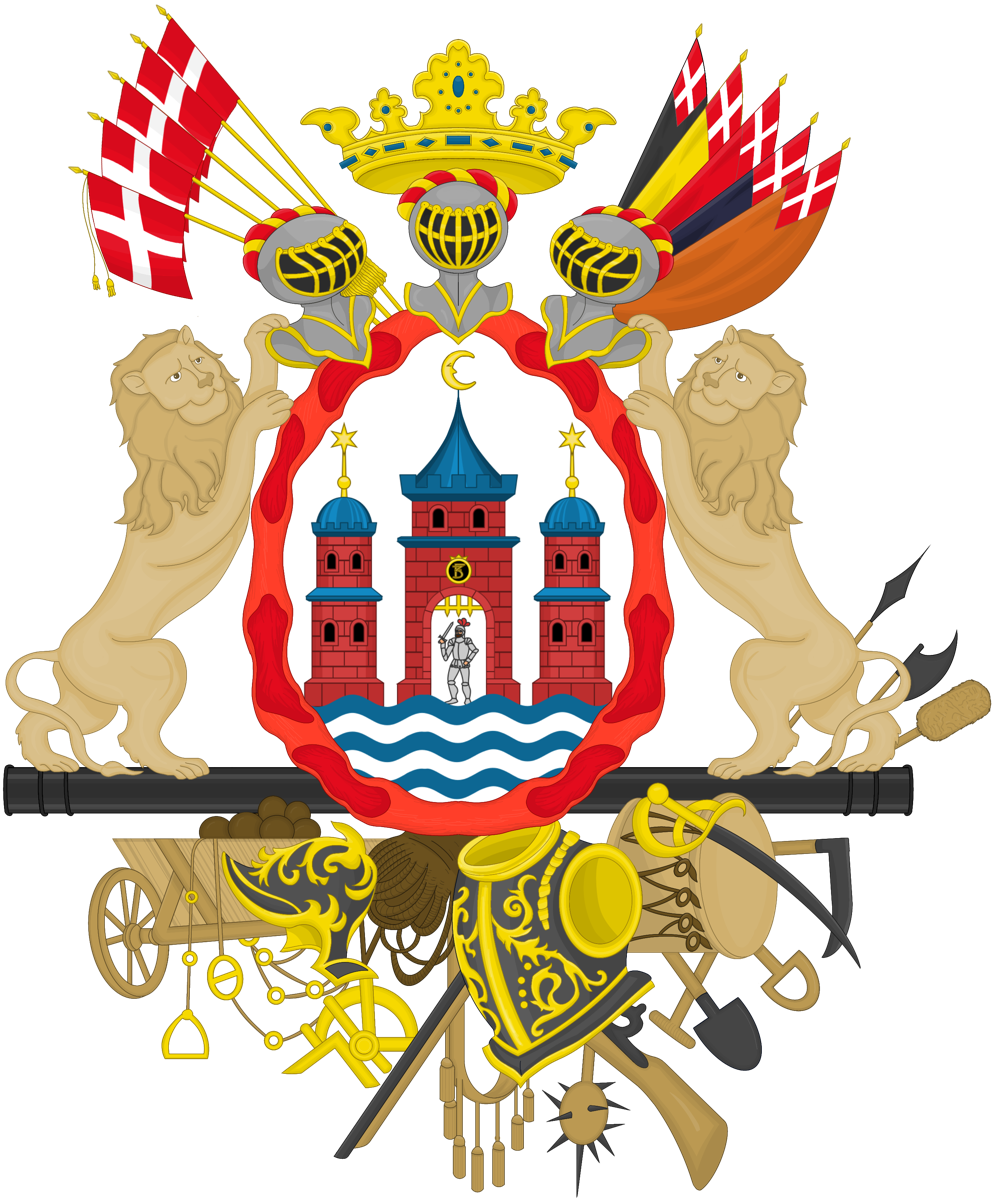

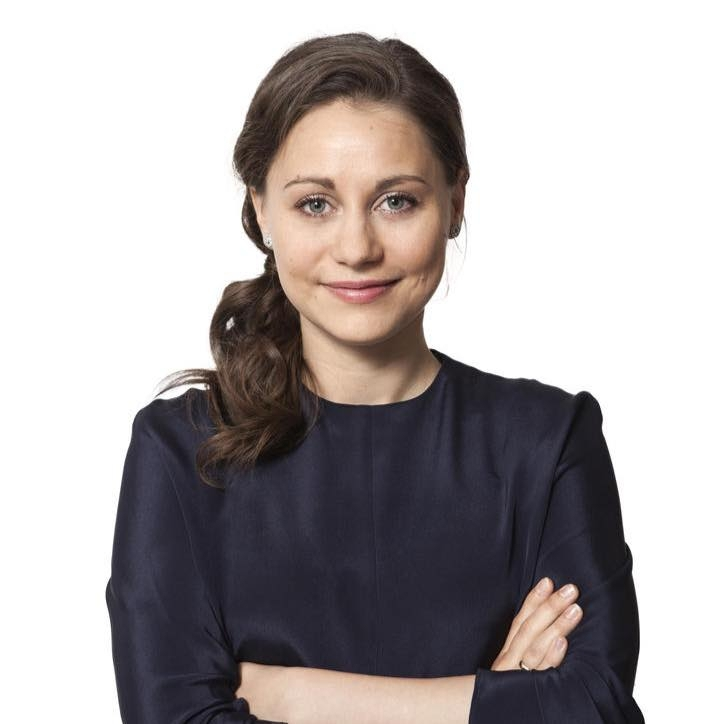
- Incumbent; Sisse Marie Welling since 1 January 2026
- Member of: Copenhagen City Council
- Seat: Copenhagen City Hall
- Appointer: Direct election
- Term length: 4 years; renewable
- Precursor: Copenhagen Upper Presidium
- Formation: 1938
- First holder: Viggo Christensen
- Website: Official website

The lord mayor of Copenhagen (Danish: Københavns Overborgmester) is the city's mayor and the leader of the Copenhagen City Council. Established in 1938, all lord mayors have since belonged to the Social Democratic Party until the 2025 Copenhagen City council election.

== List ==
| No. | Portrait | Name (born-died) | Term of office | | | Political party | Elected | Ref. |
| No. | Portrait | Name (born-died) | Took office | Left office | Time in office | Political party | Elected | Ref. |
|---|---|---|---|---|---|---|---|---|
| 1 | Viggo Christensen | Viggo Christensen (1880–1967) | 1 April 1938 | 25 April 1946 | 8 years, 24 days | Social Democrats | 1937; 1943 | |
| 2 | Hans Peter Sørensen | Hans Peter Sørensen (1886–1962) | 25 April 1946 | 31 May 1956 | 10 years, 60 days | Social Democrats | 1946; 1950; 1954 | |
| 3 | Sigvard Munk | Sigvard Munk (1891–1983) | 1 June 1956 | 26 April 1962 | 5 years, 329 days | Social Democrats | 1958 | |
| 4 | Urban Hansen | Urban Hansen (1908–1986) | 26 April 1962 | 31 March 1976 | 13 years, 340 days | Social Democrats | 1962; 1966; 1970; 1974 | |
| 5 | Egon Weidekamp | Egon Weidekamp (1921–2000) | 1 April 1976 | 14 February 1989 | 12 years, 319 days | Social Democrats | 1978; 1981; 1985 | |
| 6 | Jens Kramer Mikkelsen | Jens Kramer Mikkelsen (born 1951) | 15 February 1989 | 24 October 2004 | 15 years, 252 days | Social Democrats | 1989; 1993; 1997; 2001 | |
| – | Hellen Hedemann | Hellen Hedemann (born 1953); Acting | 25 October 2004 | 26 October 2004 | 2 days | Green Left | – | – |
| 7 | Lars Engberg | Lars Engberg (1943–2017) | 26 October 2004 | 31 December 2005 | 1 year, 66 days | Social Democrats | – | |
| 8 | Ritt Bjerregaard | Ritt Bjerregaard (1941–2023) | 1 January 2006 | 31 December 2009 | 3 years, 364 days | Social Democrats | 2005 | |
| 9 | Frank Jensen | Frank Jensen (born 1961) | 1 January 2010 | 19 October 2020 | 10 years, 292 days | Social Democrats | 2009; 2013; 2017 | |
| – | Lars Weiss | Lars Weiss (born 1971); Acting | 19 October 2020 | 1 January 2022 | 1 year, 74 days | Social Democrats | – | |
| 10 | Sophie Hæstorp Andersen | Sophie Hæstorp Andersen (born 1974) | 1 January 2022 | 29 August 2024 | 2 years, 241 days | Social Democrats | 2021 | |
| – | Lars Weiss | Lars Weiss (born 1971); Acting | 29 August 2024 | 1 January 2026 | 1 year, 125 days | Social Democrats | – | |
| 11 | Sisse Marie Welling | Sisse Marie Welling (born 1986) | 1 January 2026 | Incumbent | 305 days | Green Left | 2025 | |

== Current mayors ==
As of the municipal elections of November 2025, Copenhagen has the following mayors:

- Lord Mayor: Sisse Marie Welling (Green Left)
- Mayor of Culture, Leisure and Citizen Services: Christopher Røhl (Radical Party of the Left)
- Mayor of Employment, Integration and Business: Andreas Keil (Social Democrats)
- Mayor of Children and Youth: Jakob Næsager (Conservative People's Party)
- Mayor of Social Affairs: Karina Vestergård Madsen (Unity List)
- Mayor of Health and Care: Jens-Kristian Lütken (Venstre)
- Mayor of Climate, Environment and Technology: Line Barfod (Unity List)

== See also ==
- Timeline of Copenhagen
