= Cecilia Lonning-Skovgaard =

Danish businesswoman and politician

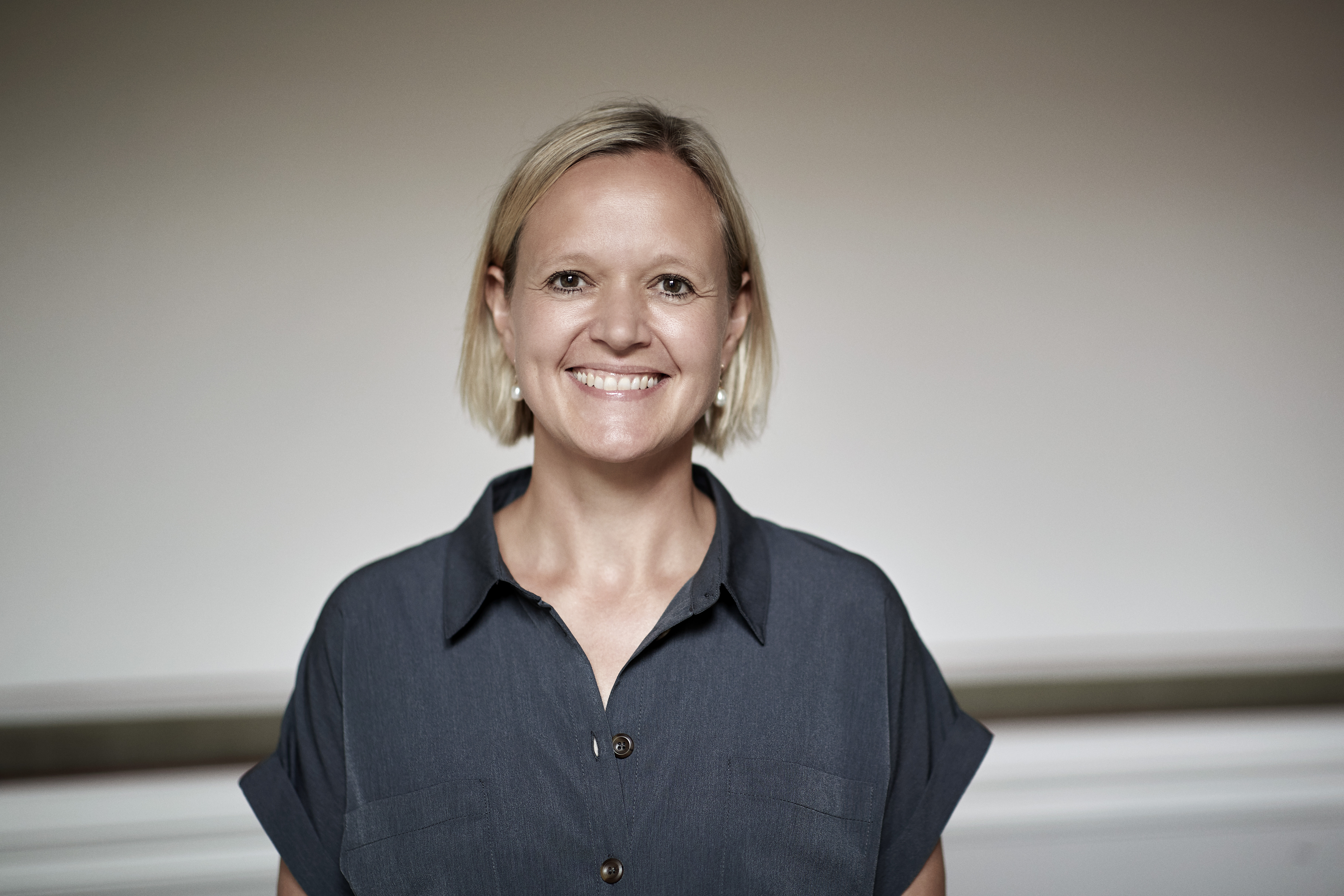
Cecilia Lonning-Skovgaard

Cecilia Lonning-Skovgaard (born November 21, 1975) is a Danish businesswoman and politician, who since January 1, 2018, has been Mayor of Employment and Integration in the Municipality of Copenhagen, elected for the Liberal Party, Venstre.

She has been a member of the Copenhagen City Council since 2008, and was her party's lead candidate at the municipal elections in Copenhagen in 2017.

Her latest job in the private sector was as Senior Director within HR at Ørsted A/S.

Cecilia Lonning-Skovgaard is married and the mother of three children, and lives in Østerbro.

== Education and private sector career ==
Cecilia Lonning-Skovgaard grew up in Hellerup, attended Krebs' Skole, and earned her Danish master's degree in 2001 as cand.scient.pol. (MSc in Political science) from the University of Aarhus.

She was the second female recipient of the Crown Prince Frederik Scholarship, making it possible for her to attend and complete a Master of Public Administration degree at the Kennedy School of Government at Harvard (2000).

She has been employed at McKinsey, Carlsberg, Codan and Ørsted A/S.

== Political career ==
She first ran as a candidate at the municipal elections in 2005, resulting in a position as second alternate member. After Martin Geertsen and Søren Pind both chose to step down, she entered the City council in April 2008.

From 2008 to 2013 she was a member of the Children's and Youth Committee. From 2014 she was a member of the Employment and Integration Committee and her party's political spokesperson in the City Council.

In September 2016 she was elected lead candidate of the Liberal Party for the municipal elections in 2017. The elections in 2017 ended with Cecilia Lonning-Skovgaard assuming the position as Mayor of Employment and Integration in 2018–2021.
