= Frank Jensen =

Danish politician (born 1961)

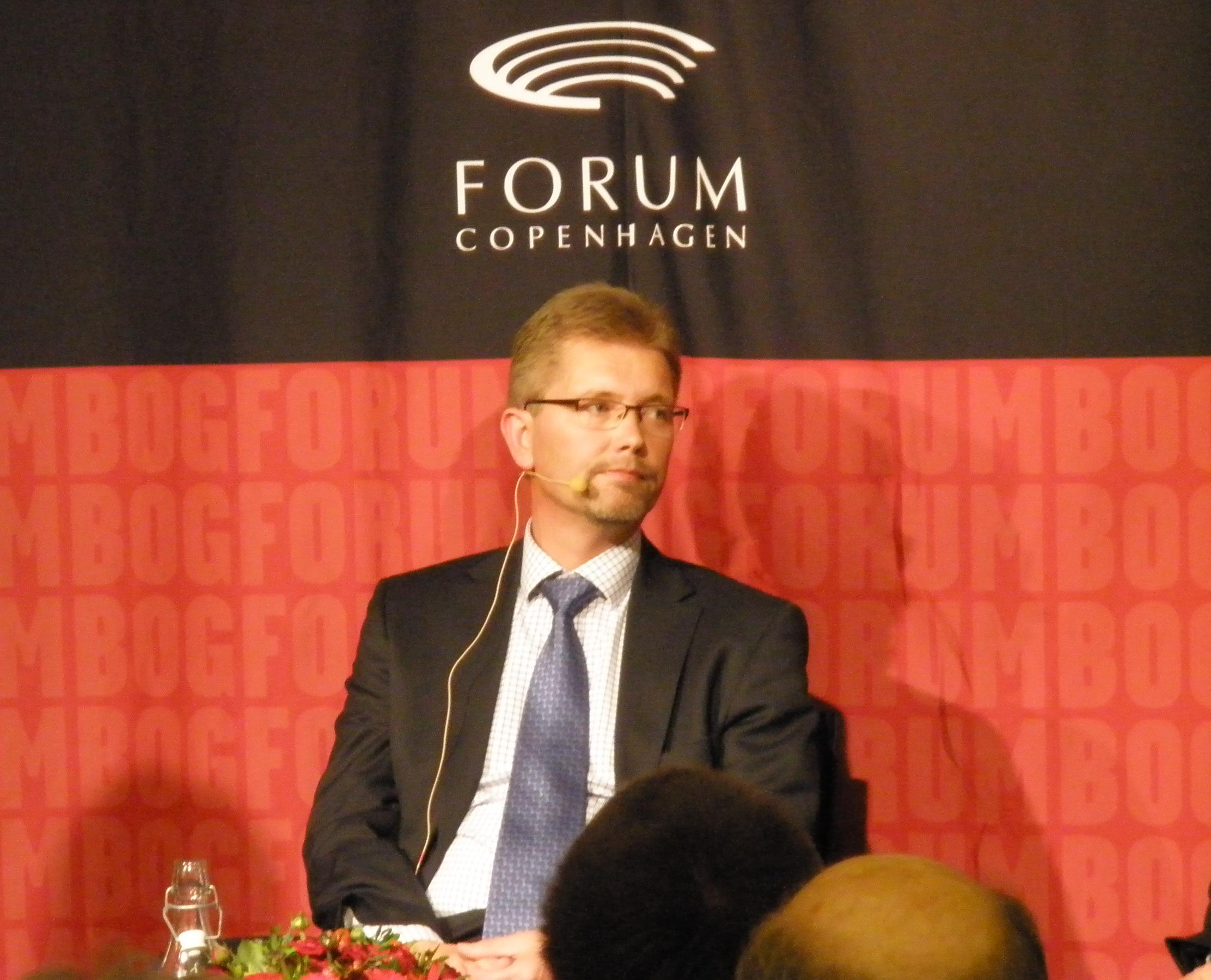
- Jensen in 2010

Lord Mayor of Copenhagen
- In office 1 January 2010 – 19 October 2020
- Deputy: Anne Vang
- Preceded by: Ritt Bjerregaard
- Succeeded by: Lars Weiss (acting)

Deputy Leader of the Social Democrats
- In office 28 June 2015 – 19 October 2020
- Leader: Mette Frederiksen
- Preceded by: Mogens Jensen

Minister of Justice
- In office 30 December 1996 – 27 November 2001
- Prime Minister: Poul Nyrup Rasmussen
- Preceded by: Bjørn Westh
- Succeeded by: Lene Espersen

Minister of Research
- In office 27 September 1994 – 30 December 1996
- Prime Minister: Poul Nyrup Rasmussen
- Preceded by: A.O Anderson
- Succeeded by: Jytte Hilden

Personal details
- Born: 28 May 1961 (age 65) Ulsted, Denmark
- Party: Social Democrats
- Spouse: Jane Frimand Pedersen
- Children: 2, including Lasse
- Education: Aalborg University

Frank Jensen (born 28 May 1961) is a former Danish politician of the Danish Social Democrats who served as Lord Mayor of Copenhagen between 2010 and 2020. He was Minister for Research from 1994 to 1996 and Minister of Justice from 1996 to 2001 under Poul Nyrup Rasmussen.

Jensen is an educated economist and holds a master's degree in economics from Aalborg University which he received in 1986.

== Political career ==
When Mogens Lykketoft resigned as leader of the Social Democrats after losing the 2005 Danish parliamentary election, Jensen and Helle Thorning-Schmidt were the two candidates to succeed him. The party members voted on 12 April 2005, electing Thorning-Schmidt as leader with 24,261 votes (53%) against 21,348 votes (47%) for Frank Jensen. After the results, he decided not to run for the Folketing again in the next election.

In 2009 he was elected as the Social Democrats lead candidate for Lord Mayor of Copenhagen. He was elected as mayor of Copenhagen in 2009, and reelected in 2013 and 2017. In 2020 he stepped down because of several sexual harassment allegations.

Jensen is the author of several scientific papers and articles. In 2018 he stated on the online magazine Impakter.com that Copenhagen has decreased its CO_{2} emissions by 40% since 2005.

== Controversies ==
In 2011, Jensen was accused of trying to lick a female coworker at a julefrokost at the Copenhagen City Hall.

In 2020, Jensen admitted that he had been sexually harassing various women in the previous ~30 years of his career.

On 19 October 2020, Jensen announced he would stop in politics and step down as Lord Mayor and Deputy Leader as a result of the allegations.

== Personal life ==
Jensen's son, Lasse Frimand Jensen, is the current Mayor of Aalborg.

== Other activities ==
- Rockwool Fonden, Member of the Board of Directors

Political offices
Preceded by A.O. Andersen	Minister for Research; 1994–1996	Succeeded by Jytte Hilden
Preceded by Bjørn Westh	Justice Minister of Denmark; 1996–2001	Succeeded by Lene Espersen
Preceded by Ritt Bjerregaard	Lord Mayor of Copenhagen; 2010–2020	Succeeded by Lars Weiss (acting); Sophie Hæstorp Andersen
