= Hans Peter Sørensen =

2nd Lord Mayor of Copenhagen

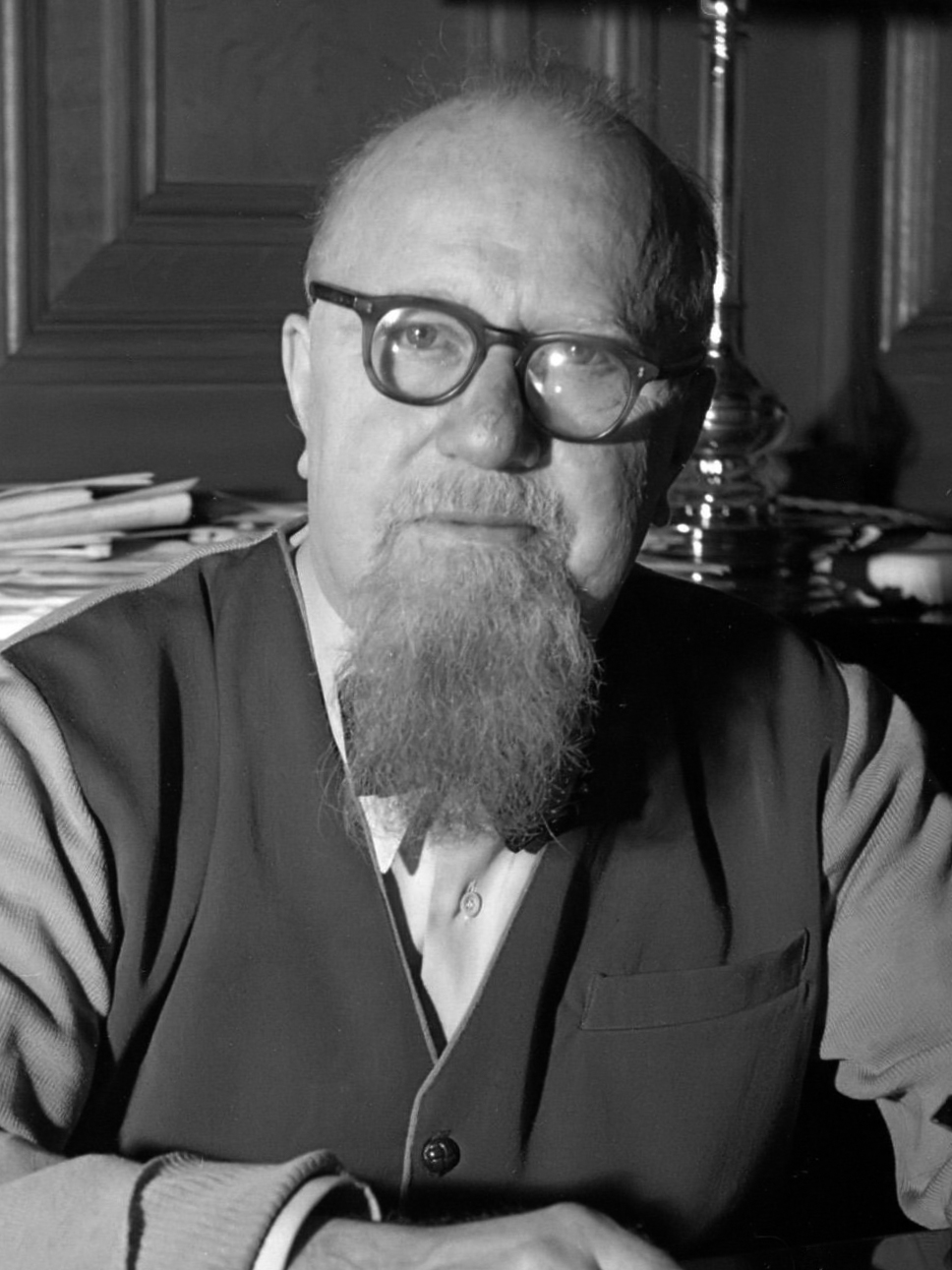
Hans Peter Sørensen (1954)

Hans Peter Sørensen (1886–1962) was the second Lord Mayor of Copenhagen, holding that office from 1946 to 1956 as a member of the Social Democratic Party.

Political offices
Preceded by Viggo Christensen	Lord Mayor of Copenhagen; 1946 – 1956	Succeeded by Sigvard Munk
