= 1917 Danish local elections =

Regional elections were held in Denmark in March 1917. 10166 municipal council members were elected.
