= 1909 Danish local elections =

Regional elections were held in Denmark in March 1909. 9897 municipal council members were elected.
