= 1921 Danish local elections =

Regional elections were held in Denmark in March 1921. 10403 municipal council members were elected.
