= Sigvard Munk =

Danish politician

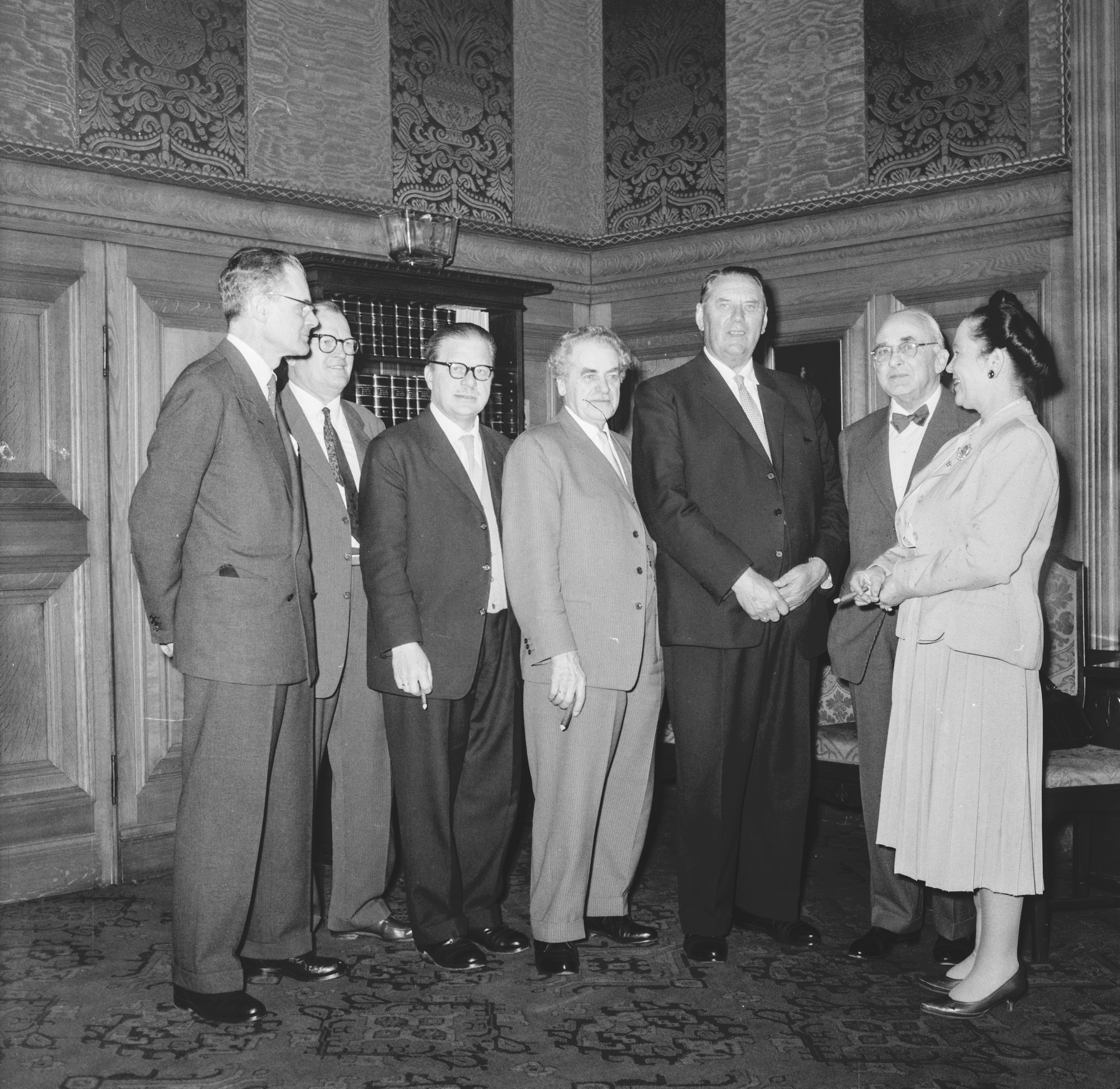
Munk (third from the right) at his 70-year birthday, by Mogens Falk-Sørensen

Sigvard Munk (April 17, 1891 – April 10, 1983) was a Danish politician for the Social Democratic Party. From 1956 to 1962, he was the Lord Mayor of Copenhagen.

In 1943, while mayor of the social area, he took the initiative of evacuating the Torah scrolls of the Synagogue of Copenhagen.

He died a week prior to his 92nd birthday.

== Early life ==
Munk was born in Ørnstrup near Horsens. After his father's death in 1910, he remained in Horsens to help support his family before later working for the Danish Telegraph Service in Copenhagen, where he became active in the trade union movement.

Political offices
Preceded by Hans Peter Sørensen	Lord Mayor of Copenhagen; 1956 – 1962	Succeeded by Urban Hansen
