= Viggo Christensen =

Danish politician

Viggo Christensen (29 April 1880–9 August 1967) was the first Lord Mayor of Copenhagen, holding that office from 1938 to 1946 for the Social Democratic Party. From 1917 to 1938, he held the office of mayor of the social area in Copenhagen, Denmark.

Viggo Christensen was educated as a typographer in 1899.

Political offices
Preceded by Title created	Lord Mayor of Copenhagen; 1938 – 1946	Succeeded by Hans Peter Sørensen
