= 1913 Danish local elections =

Regional elections were held in Denmark in March 1913. 10,038 municipal council members were elected.
