= Line Barfod =

Danish lawyer and politician

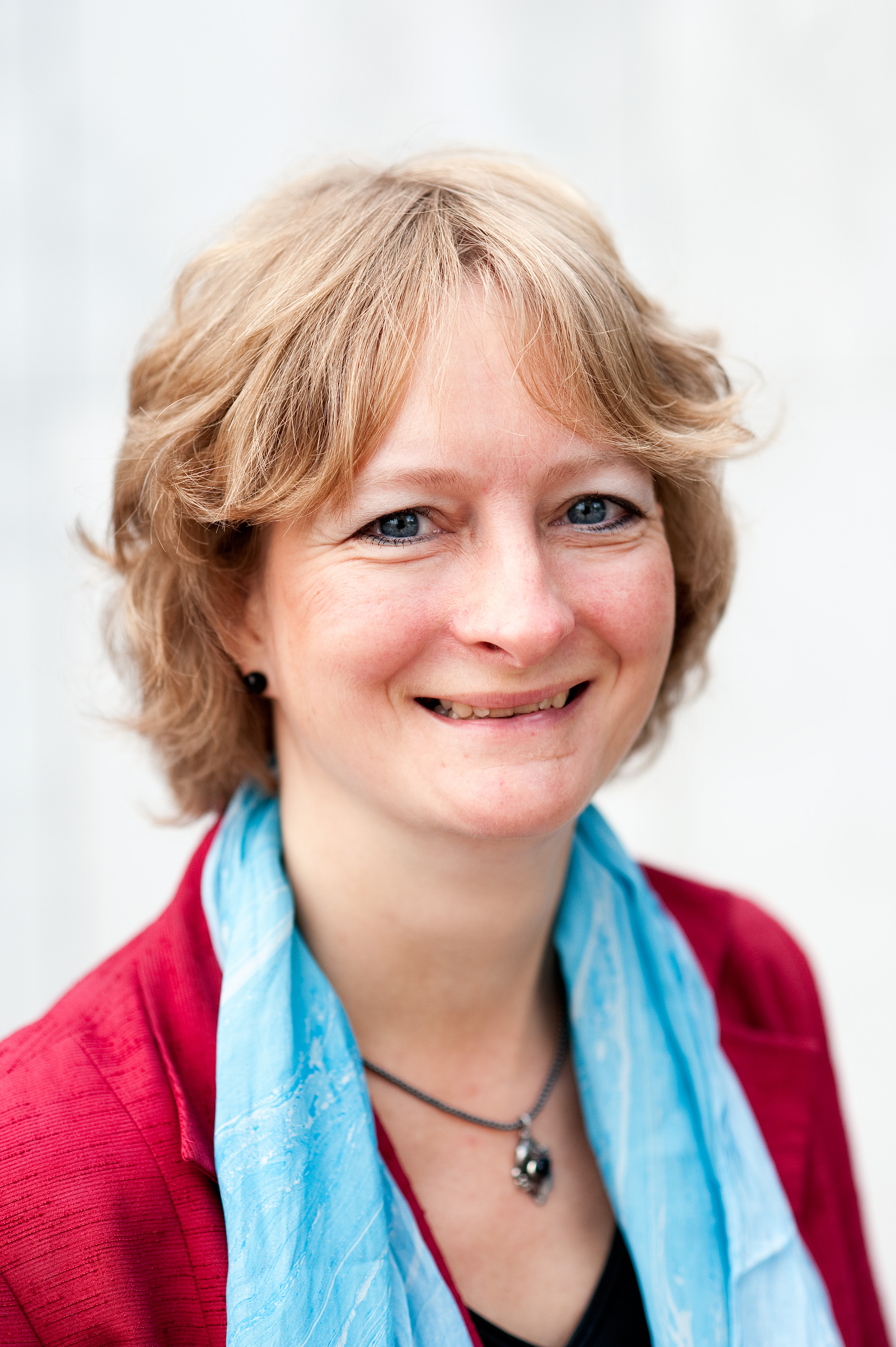
- Barfod in 2010
- Born: 24 May 1964 (age 62); Copenhagen
- Education: Rysensteen Upper Secondary; University of Copenhagen
- Occupations: Lawyer and politician

Line Barfod (born 24 May 1964, in Copenhagen) is a lawyer and politician in Denmark. She is a former member of the Folketing (Danish parliament) for the Red-Green Alliance.

Line Barfod is the daughter of retired assistant librarian Werner Brandstrup Andreasen and social worker Åse Barfod. She is married to Klaus Hansen. They have four children.

== Parliamentary career ==
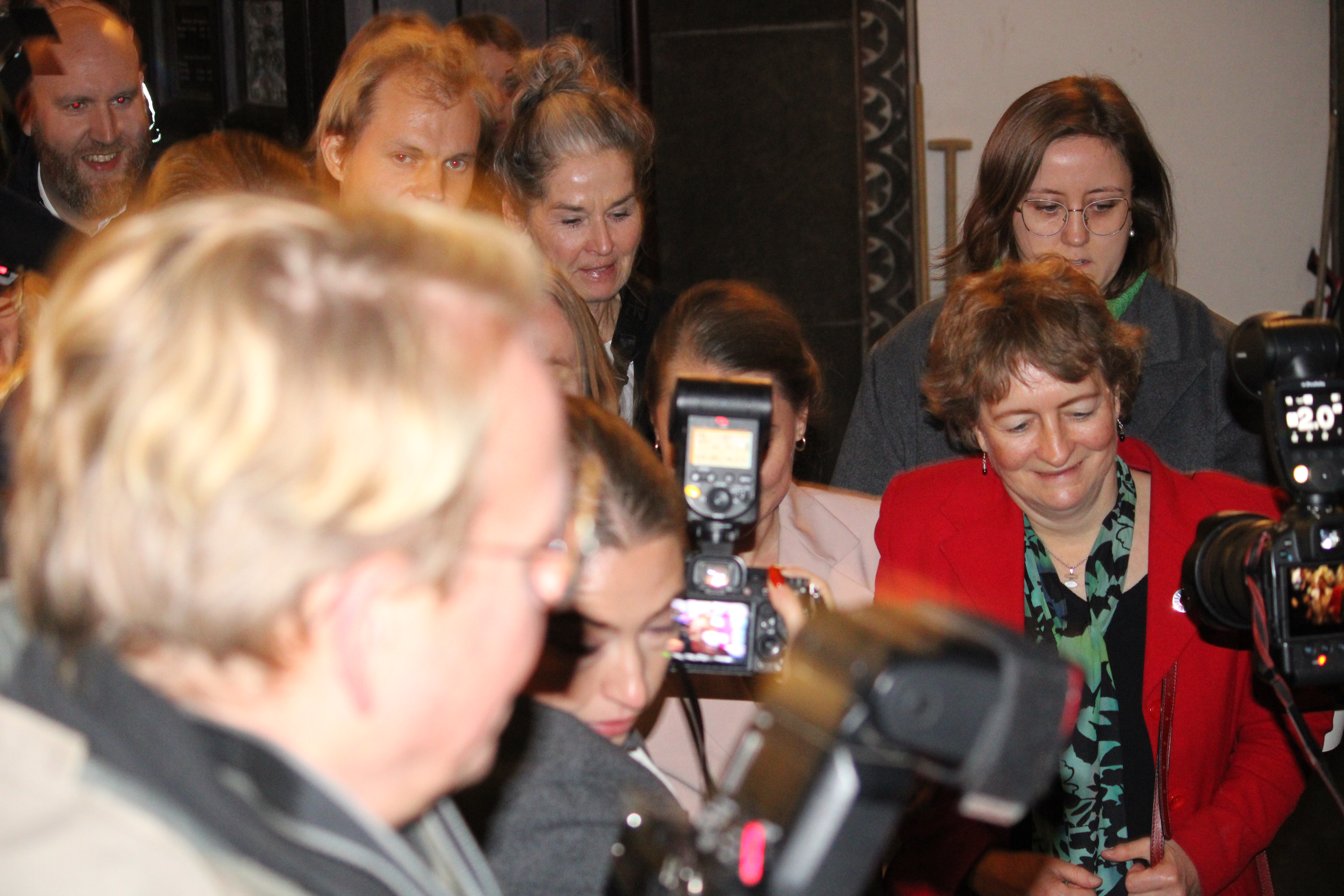
Barfod arriving with Sisse Marie Welling to Copenhagen City Hall, 18 November 2025

Prior to her current tenure, Barford was a member of the Folketing for the Red-Green Alliance in Eastern Copenhagen constituency from 20 November 2001 to 8 February 2005, a temporary member of the Folketing for the Red-Green Alliance in Århus County constituency from 8 October to 30 November 1998, the Red-Green Alliance's candidate in Nørrebro nomination district, 1999 to 2001, in Århus West nomination district, 1998 to 1999, and in Frederiksborg County nomination district, 1996 to 1998.

== Education and Profession ==
Barford attended Rysensteen Upper Secondary School, 1980–1983, and Tidens High School, 1983–1984. She has a master's degree in law from the University of Copenhagen, which she attended 1985–1992. Solicitor with Advokatfirmaet Foldschack & Forchhammer from 2002. Junior solicitor and solicitor with Advokaterne Ulla Paabøl & Knud Foldschack 1993–2002. Junior solicitor with Advokat Jørgen Lokdam 1992. Tutor in criminal law at the University of Copenhagen, 1992–2000. Counsellor in study debt with the Students' Council from 1991.

== Affiliations ==
She was chairwoman of "Fælles Kurs Ungdom" (Common Course youth wing), 1984–1985. Technical secretary with the Communist Students 1987–1989. Member of the presidium and finance committee of the Student Council, the University of Copenhagen, 1989–1990. Member of the governing body of the DIS Fund, 1990–1992, Chairwoman of "Studenterbogladens Fond" (Student Bookshop Fund), 1991–1997, Chairwoman of "Foreningen Kulturbyens Venner" (Association of Friends of Culture Town), 1994–1998. Member of the council of representatives of the Housing Fund for single mothers and fathers from 1997, on the Central Board of the Red-Green Alliance from 1998 to 2002, and from 2003 to 2005, on the editorial committee of the Association of Solicitors' legal-political periodical 'Lov & Ret' (Law and Justice) from 1997, and on the council of representatives of the financial institution 'Fælleskassen', from 2000.
