= Sisse Marie Welling =

Danish politician (born 1986)

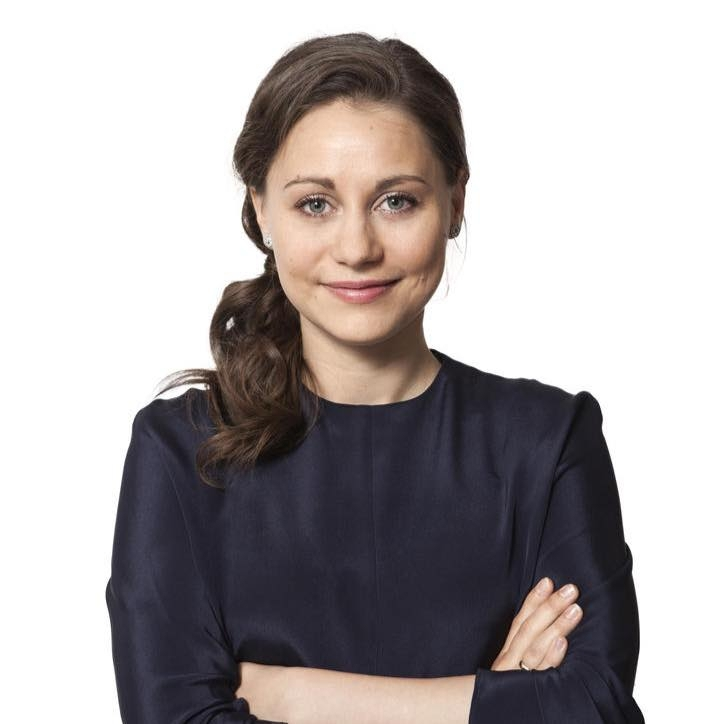
- Welling in 2017

Lord Mayor of Copenhagen
- Incumbent
- Assumed office 1 January 2026
- Preceded by: Lars Weiss

Personal details
- Born: 25 February 1986 (age 40) Aarhus, Denmark
- Party: Green Left

Sisse Marie Welling (born 25 February 1986) is a Danish politician of the Green Left. Welling took office as Lord Mayor of Copenhagen on 1 January 2026, the first non-Social Democrat to serve in the role. She was previously city alderman for health and care from 2018 to 2025.

== Early life and education ==
Welling was born in February 1986 and grew up in Aarhus, Denmark. She attended secondary school at Aarhus Statsgymnasium. She studied history at the University of Copenhagen and completed her master’s degree in 2017.

== Career ==
Welling was first elected to Copenhagen's city council in 2009 when she was 23. She served as city councillor or alderman (borgmester) responsible for health and older people or health and care from 2018 to 2025.

In 2026, she became the Lord Mayor (overborgmester) of Copenhagen representing the Socialist People’s Party. Her win was the first time a member of the Social Democrats wasn't Lord Mayor of Copenhagen in more 100 years.

== Personal life ==
She lives on Amager with her husband, and their two children.
