= 1937 Danish local elections =

Regional elections were held in Denmark in March 1937. 11425 municipal council members were elected.
In some municipals, this election was moved to March 1938.

== Results of regional elections ==
The results of the regional elections:

=== Municipal Councils ===
Party	Seats
Social Democrats	2,496
Venstre	2,374
Danish Social Liberal Party	1,078
Conservative People's Party	602
Others	4,235
Outside election	640
Total	11,425
