= Sophie Hæstorp Andersen =

Danish politician

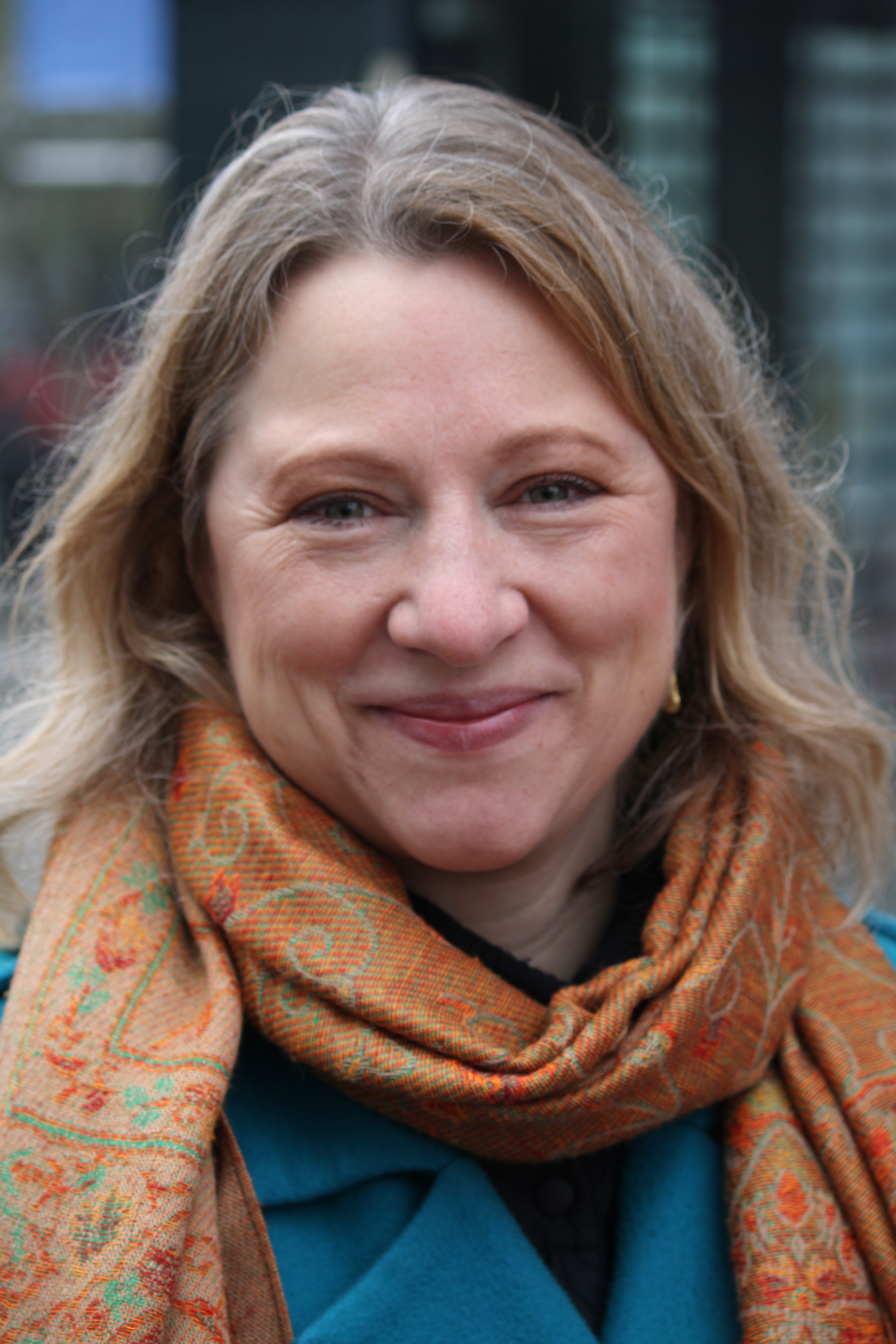
- Hæstorp Andersen in 2026

Minister of Social Affairs
- In office 29 August 2024 – 3 June 2026
- Prime Minister: Mette Frederiksen
- Preceded by: Pernille Rosenkrantz-Theil
- Succeeded by: Monika Rubin

Lord Mayor of Copenhagen
- In office 1 January 2022 – 29 August 2024
- Preceded by: Lars Weiss (act.)
- Succeeded by: Lars Weiss (act.)

Personal details
- Born: 26 September 1974 (age 51) Copenhagen, Denmark
- Spouse: Troels Andersen
- Children: 2
- Occupation: Politician

Sophie Hæstorp Andersen (born 26 September 1974) is a Danish politician and the current Minister of Social Affairs. She was the Lord Mayor of Copenhagen from 1 January 2022 to 29 August 2024. She was the regional council chairperson of the Capital Region from 1 January 2014 until 31 July 2021. Before that, she sat in the Folketing.

Andersen is the daughter of Svend Hæstorp and costume designer Pia Else Andersen. She is married to Troels Andersen and they have two children.

In 2020 she was chosen by the Social Democrats to be their main candidate for mayor of Copenhagen in 2021, replacing Frank Jensen.
