= Copenhagen City Hall =

Headquarters of the municipal council of Copenhagen

- Københavns Rådhus (Danish)
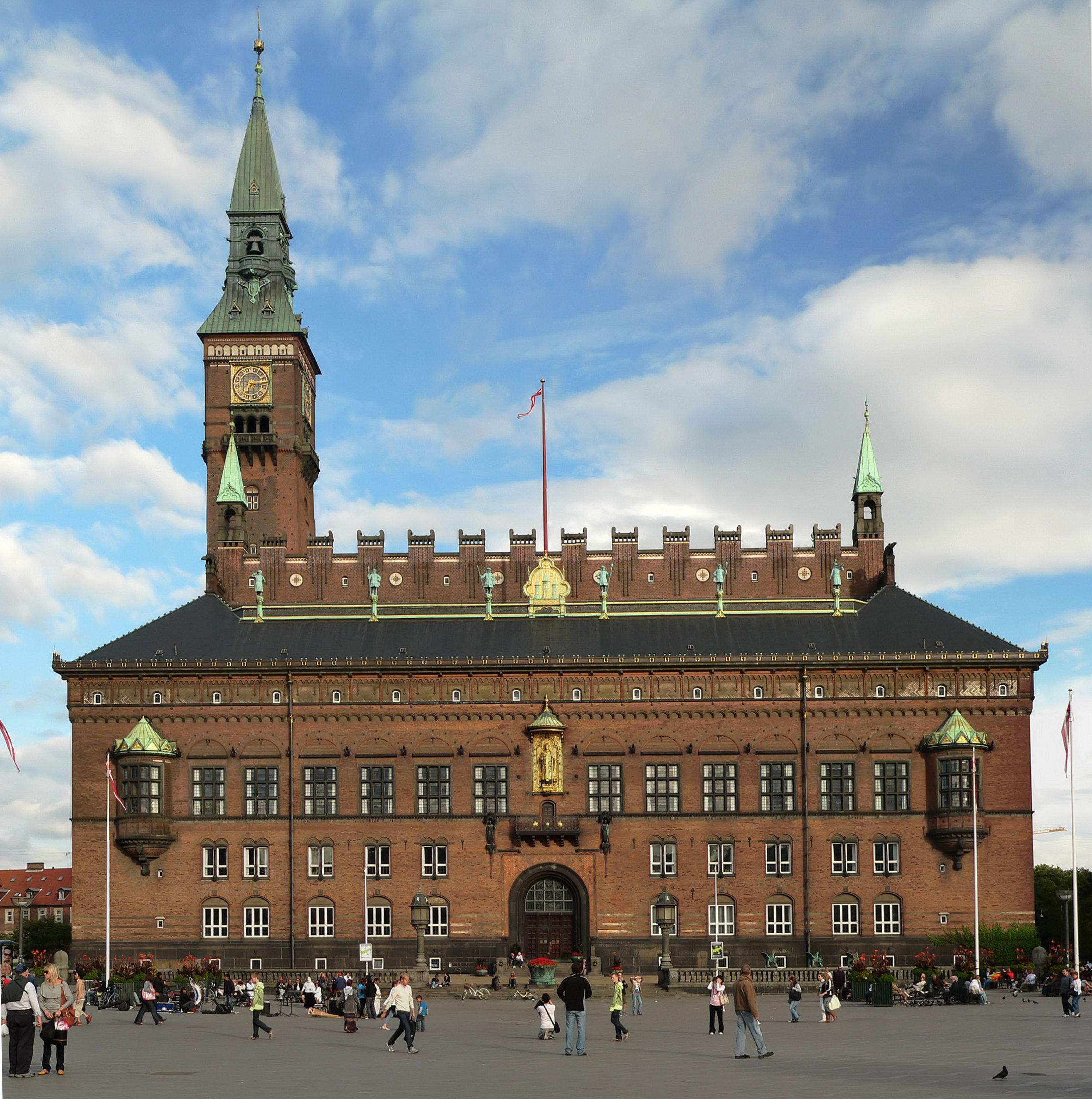
- Copenhagen City Hall in 2018

- Location within Copenhagen

General information
- Architectural style: National Romantic style
- Location: Copenhagen, Denmark
- Coordinates: 55°40′31″N 12°34′13″E
- Construction started: 1893
- Completed: 1905
- Client: Copenhagen Municipality

Height
- Height: 105.6 metres (346 ft)

Design and construction
- Architect: Martin Nyrop

Copenhagen City Hall (Danish: Københavns Rådhus) is the city hall of Copenhagen, Denmark, situated on the City Hall Square in central Copenhagen. It houses the headquarters of the Copenhagen City Council as well as the office of the Lord mayor of the Copenhagen Municipality.

The sixth incarnation of the Copenhagen City Hall, the current building in National Romantic Renaissance Revial style was designed by the Danish architect Martin Nyrop and constructed between 1892 and 1905.

== History ==
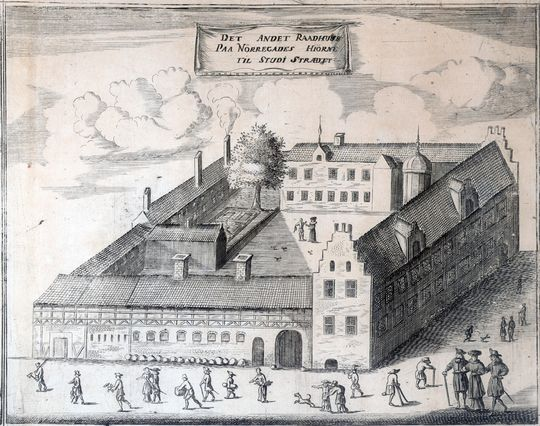
The 14th century city hall and later bishop's palace on the corner of Nørregade and Studiestræde as Erik Pontoppidan imagined it in 1760.

The current structure is the sixth city hall in Copenhagen. Before it was moved to its present location, the previous city halls were situated at or near Gammeltorv/Nytorv approximately 500 m (1,600 ft) northeast of the current location.

Copenhagen's first medieval town hall was located at Gammeltorv (English: Old Square), Copenhagen's oldest square and the centre of the medieval city's market trade. However, little is known about it, as there is no reliable information about the exact location, what it looked like, or when it was built.

At the end of the 14th century, a new city hall was established on the corner of Nørregade and Studiestræde opposite the Church of Our Lady. The building was later used as a bishop's palace.

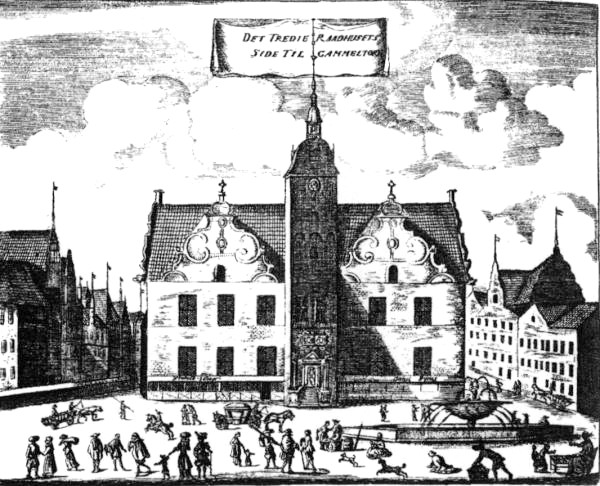
The 15th century city hall after its rebuilding in the early 17th century as seen from Gammeltorv.

The third city hall, again located at Gammeltorv, was in use from about 1479 until it burned down in the great Copenhagen fire of 1728. In 1608-10, King Christian IV had it rebuilt into a small Renaissance building with curved gables and a slender octagonal stair tower.

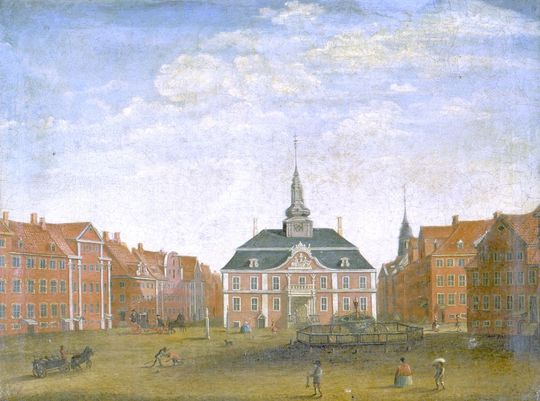
The 18th century city hall seen from Gammeltorv c. 1750.

The fourth city hall was built on the site of the previous one in 1728. It was constructed in Baroque style to designs by J.C. Ernst and J.C. Krieger. Also this building was destroyed by fire, as it burned down in the great Copenhagen fire of 1795.

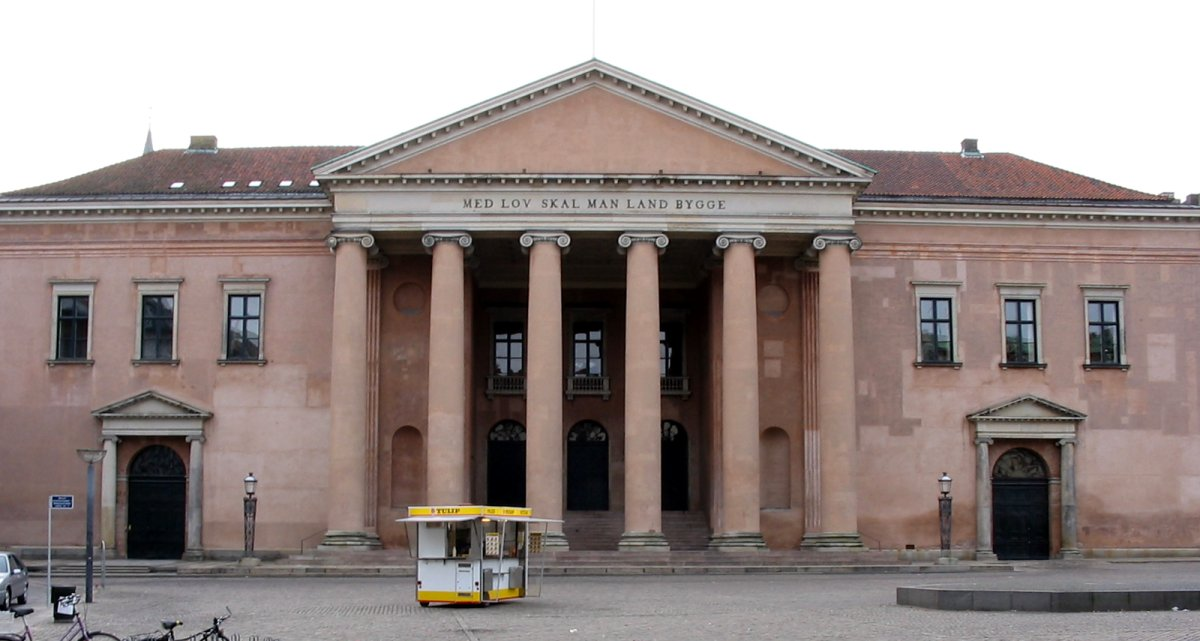
The 19th century city hall, photographed in 2004.

Delayed by a lack of building materials and the outbreak of the English Wars, a fifth city hall was not completed before 1815. It was located on Nytorv, a short distance from the location of the two previous city halls. Designed in Neoclassical style by the architect Christian Frederik Hansen, it was intended to house both the city hall and a court house. The building still exists today, and is in use as the Copenhagen Court House.

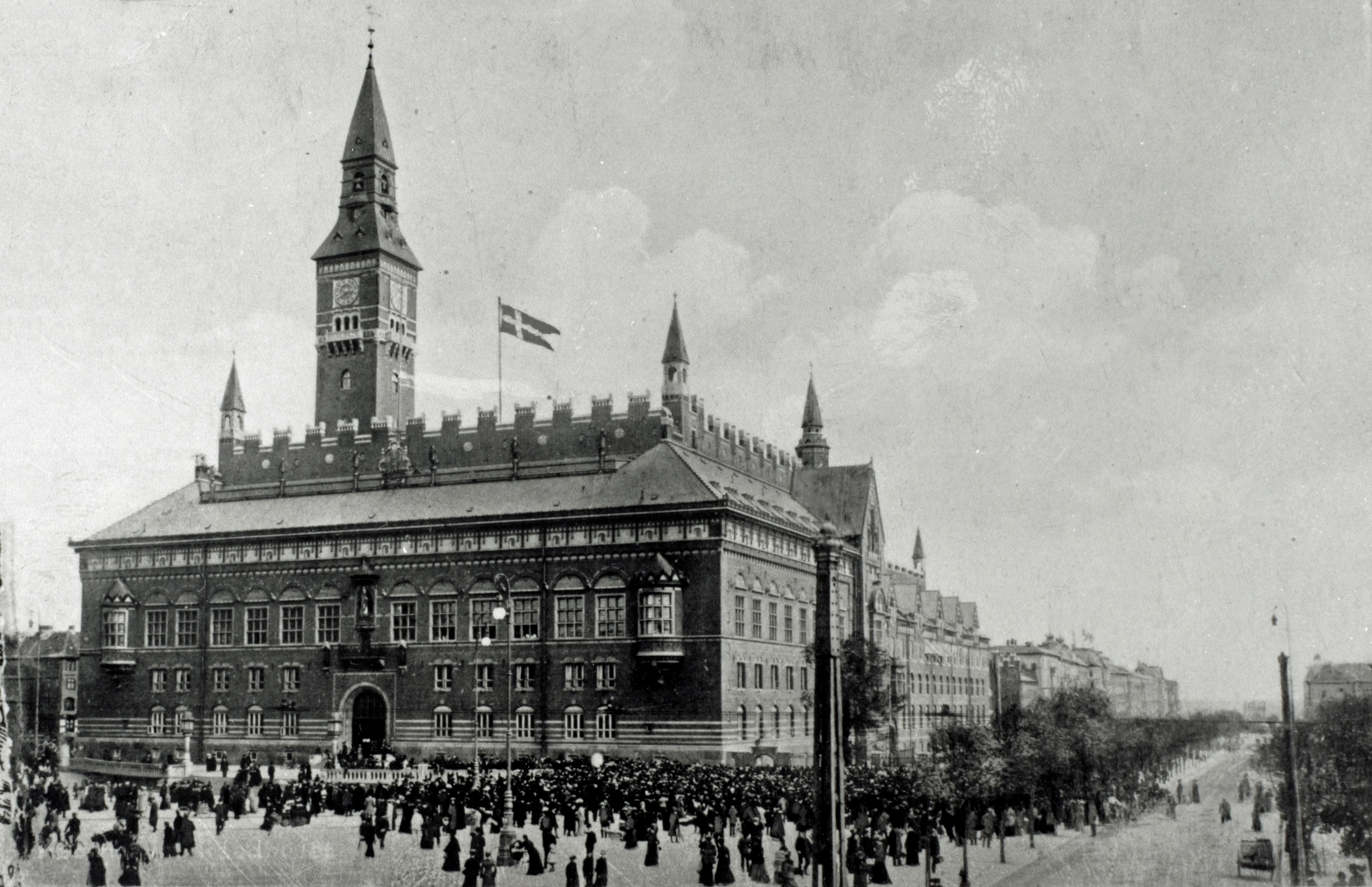
Inauguration of the 20th century city hall on 12 September 1905.

By the late 19th century, Copenhagen's rapid expansion made the old building on Nytorv inadequate, and it was decided to move the city hall to a new, bigger and more representative building in a new location. After an architectural competition, the architect Martin Nyrop won the assignment of constructing the sixth and current city hall. Vilhelm Fischer served as the supervisor of works. The construction took more than ten years. It began in 1892 and the building was inaugurated on 12 September 1905.

== Architecture ==
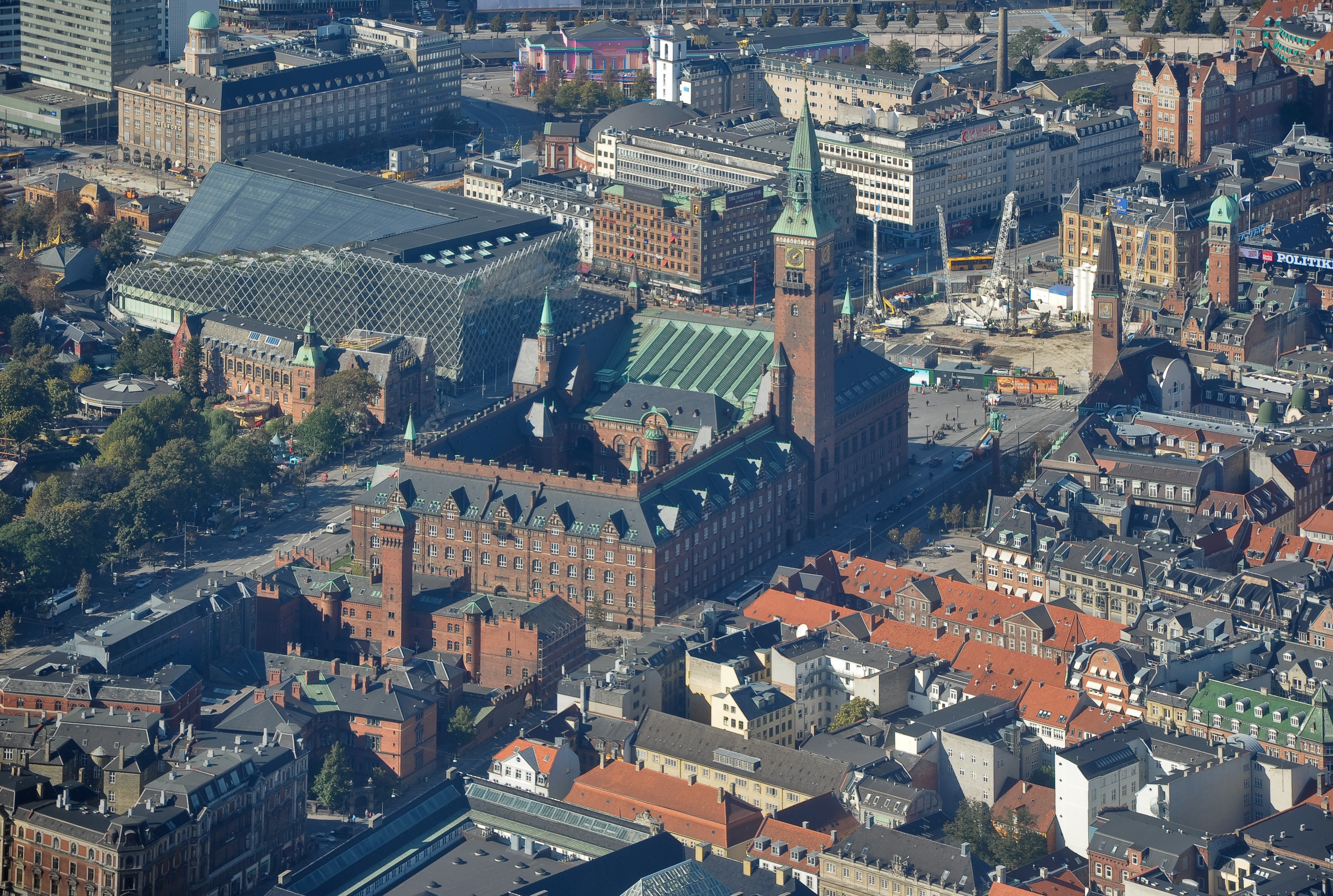
Aerial view of the city hall from the south.

Martin Nyrop's city hall is designed in the National Romantic style but with inspiration from the City Hall of Siena, Italy. The building is dominated by its richly ornamented front, the gilded statue of Absalon just above the balcony and the tall, slim clock tower. The latter is, at 105.6 metres, one of the tallest buildings in the generally low city of Copenhagen.

The City Hall building consists of two longitudinal wings along Vester Voldgade and H.C. Andersens Boulevard respectively. They are connected by three transverse buildings. Between the three transverse buildings are the covered Main Hall and the open-air City Hall Garden.

In addition to the tower clock, the City Hall also houses Jens Olsen's World Clock.

== Cultural references ==
- Copenhagen City Hall is featured prominently in the 1978 Danish comedy film The Olsen Gang Goes to War (1978), the 10th installment in the Olsen Gang film series, especially in the famous scene where Egon Olsen is tied up outside the city hall tower clock.
- In 2007, the National Bank of Denmark issued a 20 DKK commemorative coin of the tower.
- Many of the hospital scenes where Lili Elbe (Eddie Redmayne) undergoes her operations in the 2015 drama film The Danish Girl were filmed in the atrium of Copenhagen City Hall.

== Image gallery ==
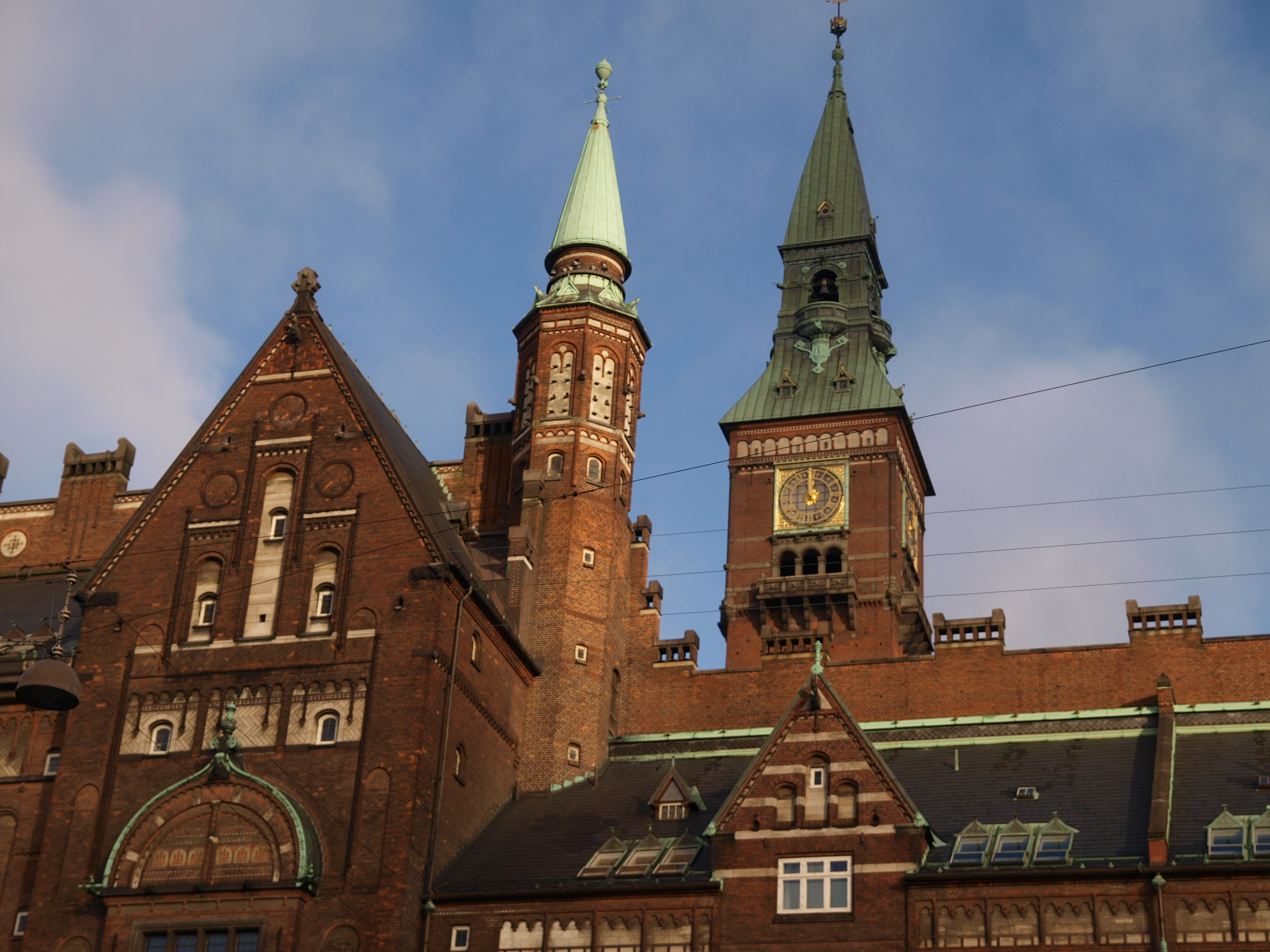
Details of the facade

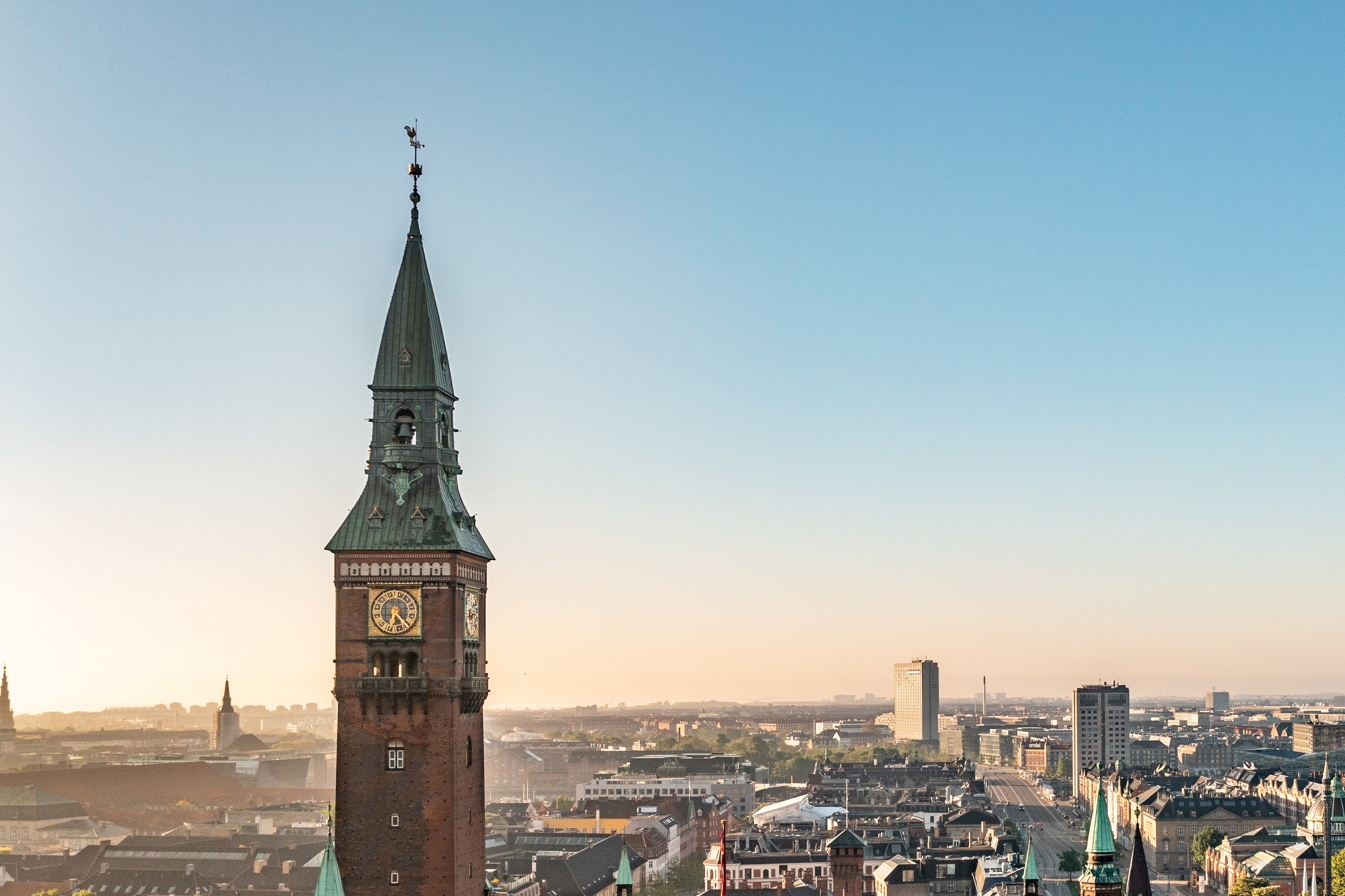
Tower

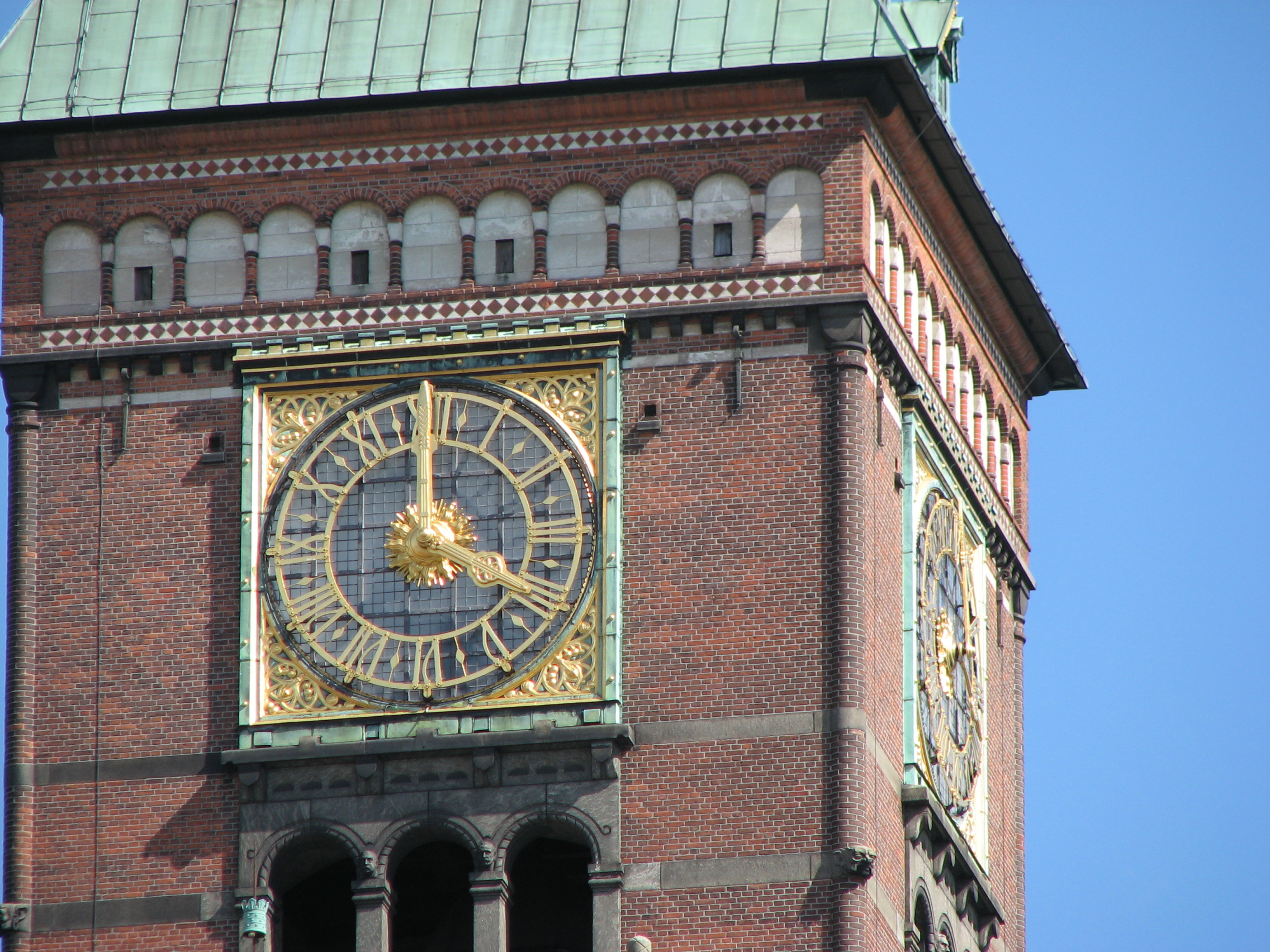
Clock

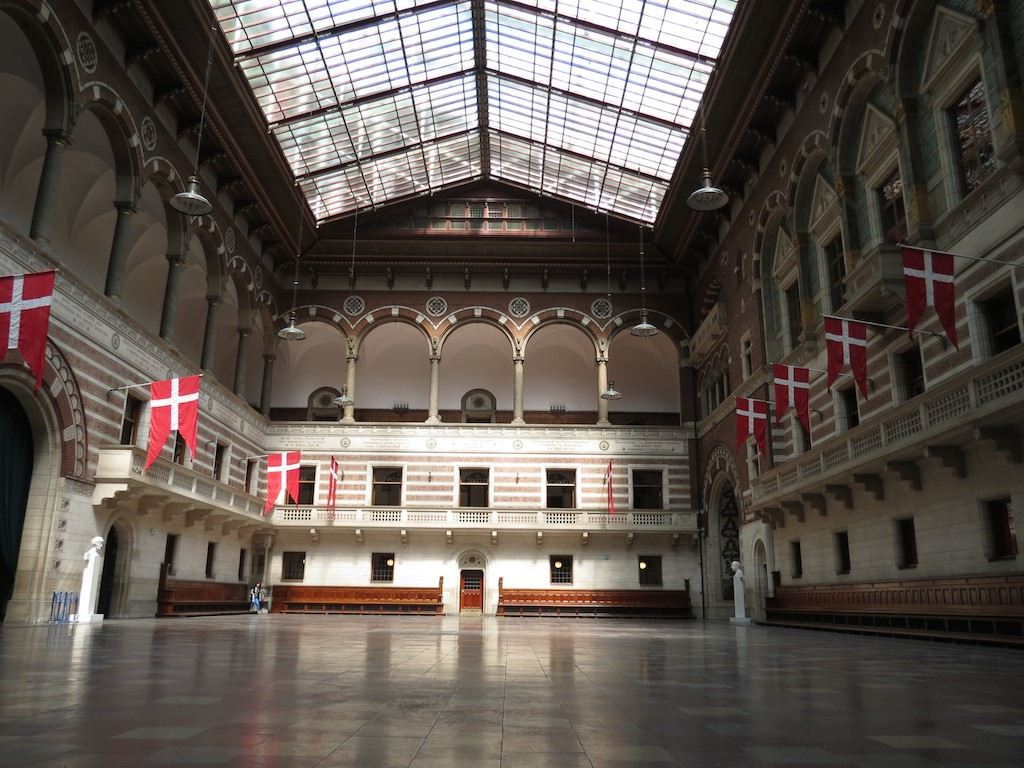
Interior

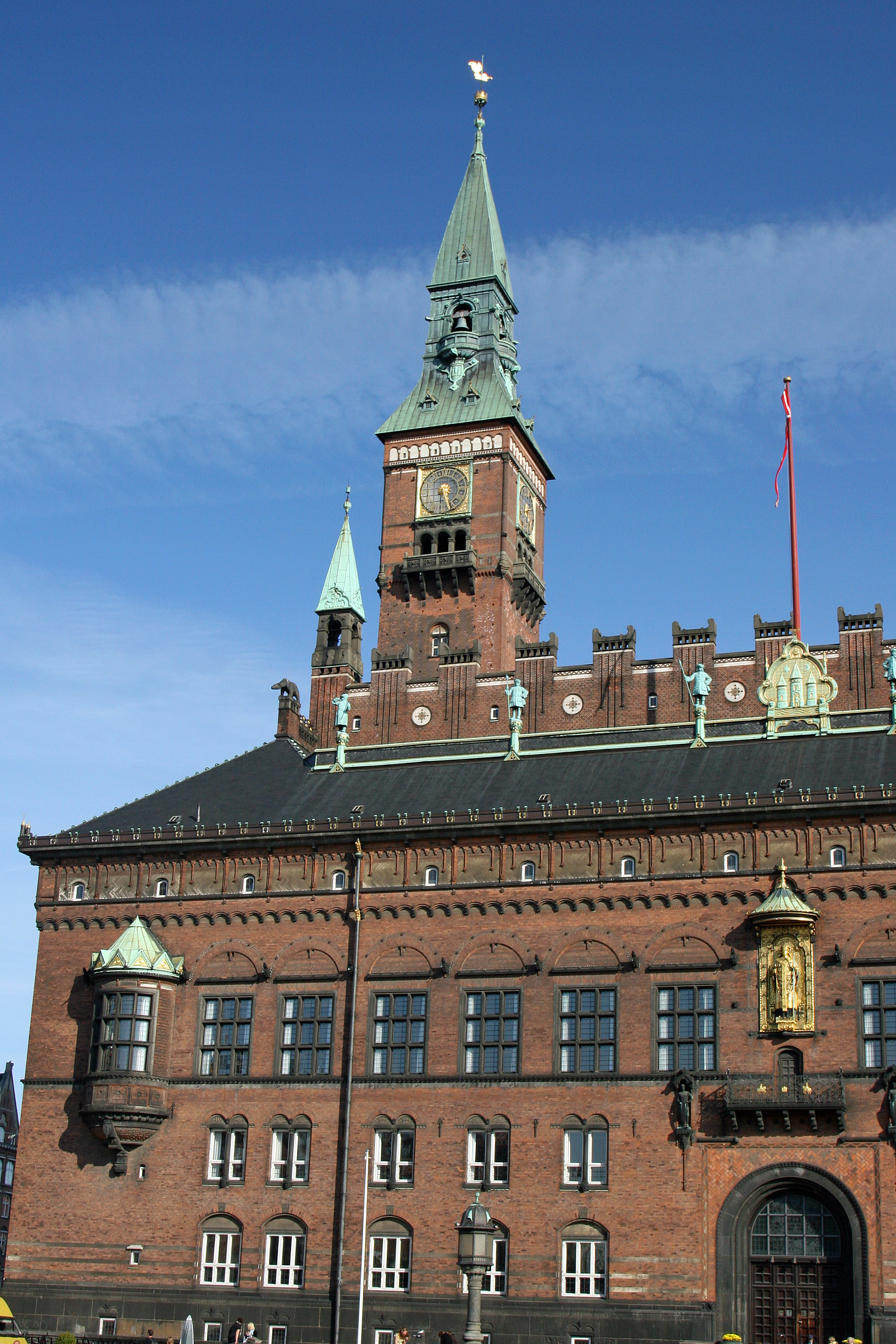

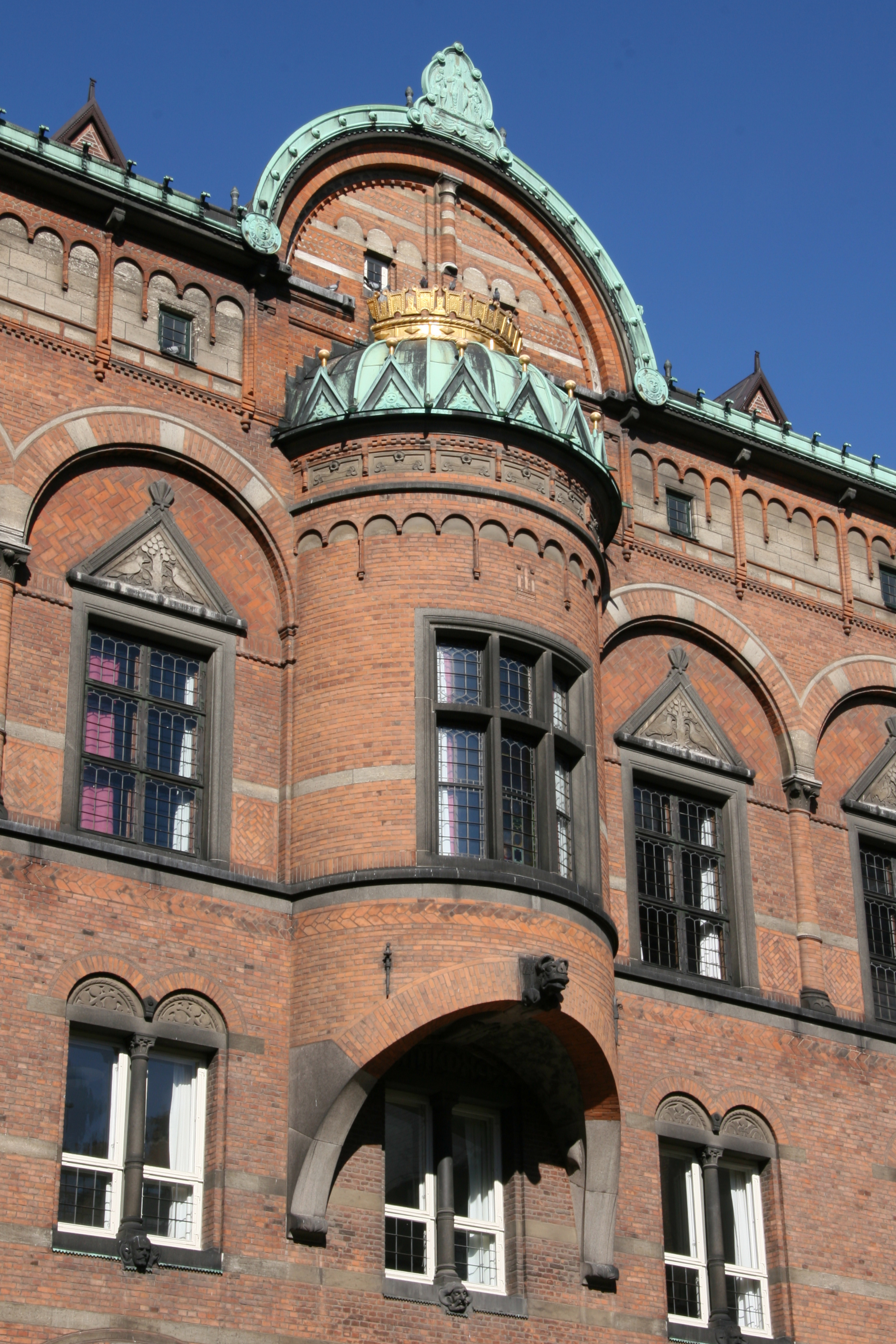

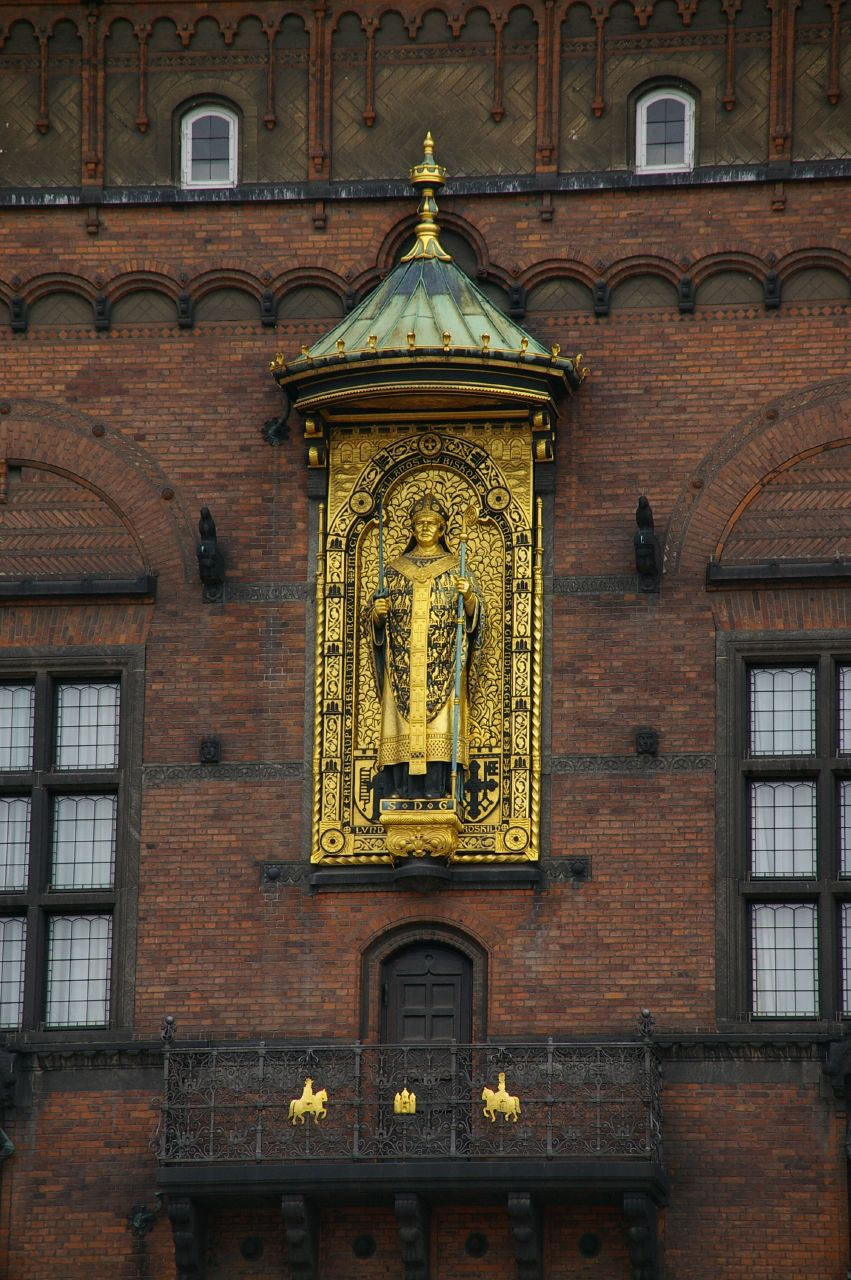
Absalon relief

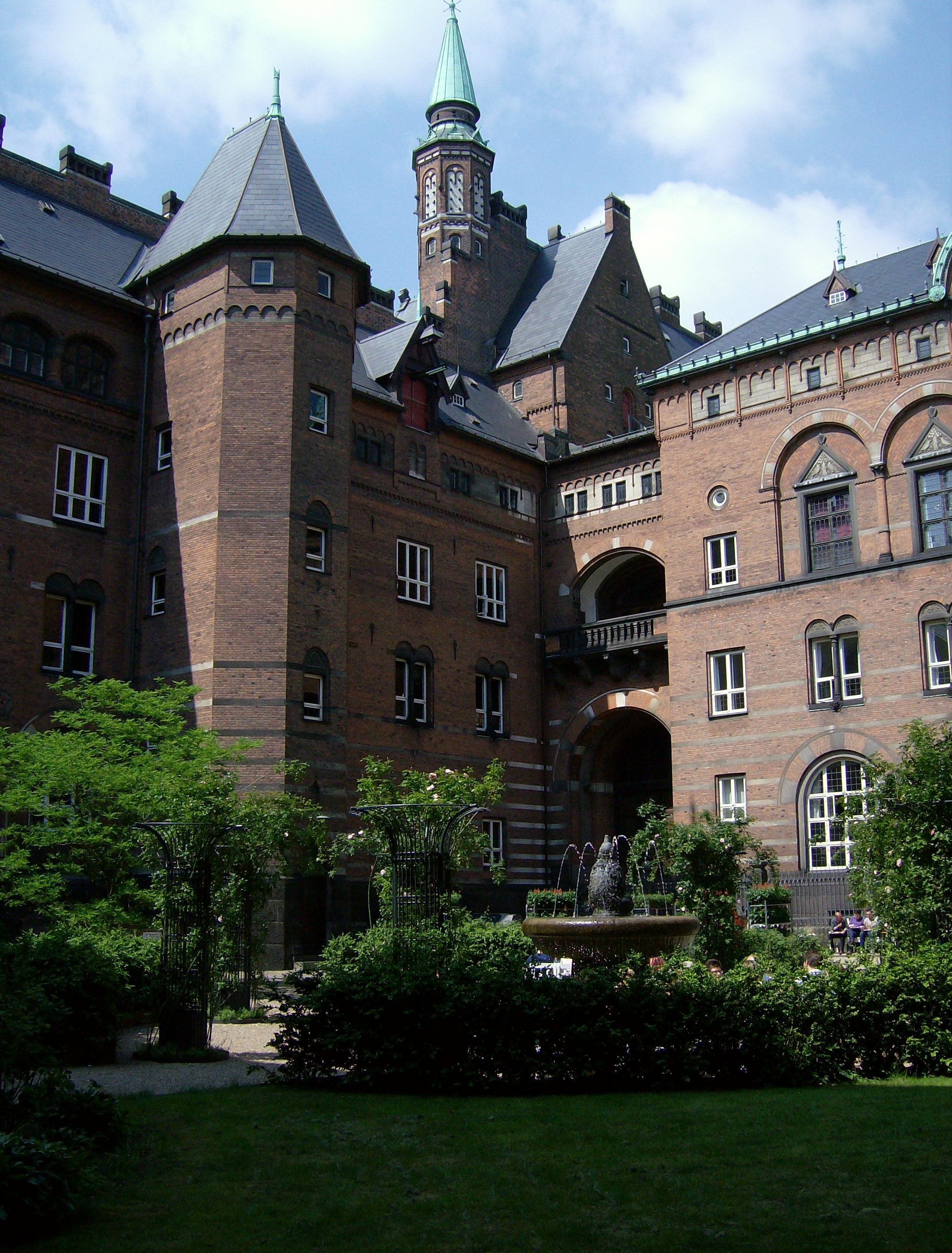
From the courtyard
