= Lars Weiss =

Danish politician (born 1971)

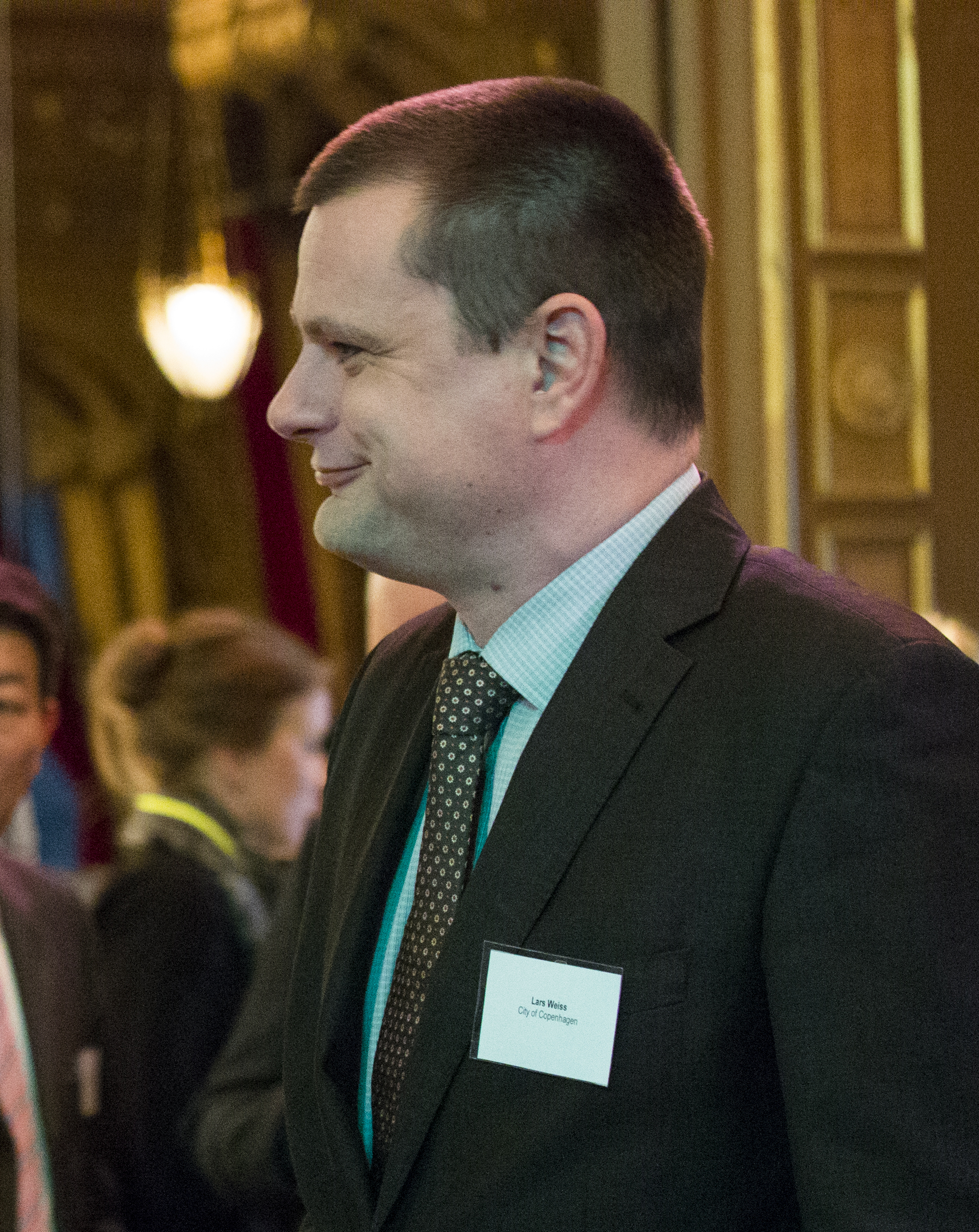
Lars Weiss in 2013.

Lars Henrik Weiss (born 20 May 1971) is a Danish politician from Socialdemokratiet and a member of Copenhagen City Council, who served as acting Lord Mayor of Copenhagen from 19 October 2020 to 31 December 2021, and again from 29 August 2024 with the intention to just serve until the end of 2025. Lars Weiss did not seek re-election in the 2025 election.
