= List of parks and open spaces in Copenhagen =

This is a list of parks and open spaces in Copenhagen, Denmark.

== Indre By (city centre) ==
Parks and open spaces in the Indre By district of Copenhagen:

Name	Image	Created	Size	Location	Ref
Amaliehaven		1983	1 ha		
Christianshavns Vold		1918	12 ha		
City Hall Garden		1905			
Copenhagen Botanical Garden		1870	10 ha		
Glyptoteque Garden		1901			
Holmen's Cemetery		1666			
Kongens Have		1606	16 ha		
Ørstedsparken		1879	6.5 ha		
Østre Anlæg		1870	12 ha		
Royal Library Garden		1920	1 ha		

== Amager ==
Parks and open spaces in the Amager Øst and Amager Vest districts of Copenhagen:

Name	Image	Created	Size	Location	Ref
Amager Fælled					
Amager Nature			3,000 ha		
Amager Strandpark		2005	60 ha		
Havneparken		1984	4 ha		
Kløvermarken		1950s			
Lergravsparken		1930s			
Our Saviour's Cemetery					

== Bispebjerg ==
Parks and open spaces in the Valby district of Copenhagen:

Name	Image	Created	Size	Location	Ref
Emdrup Søpark					
Bispebjerg Cemetery					
Lersøparken					

== Brønshøj-Husum ==
Parks and open spaces in the Brønshøj and Husum districts of Copenhagen:

Name	Image	Created	Size	Location	Ref
Utterslev Mose		1948	20 ha		

== Frederiksberg ==
Parks and open spaces in Frederiksberg Municipality:

Name	Image	Created	Size	Location	Ref
Digterlunden					
Frederiksberg Gardens		1699	32 ha		
LIFE Botanical Gardens		1858			
Royal Danish Horticultural Society's Garden		1882	1.6 ha		
Søndermark Cemetery		1699	6 ha		
Søndermarken		1699	32 ha		

== Nørrebro ==
Parks and open spaces in the Nørrebro district of Copenhagen:

Name	Image	Created	Size	Location	Ref
Assistens Cemetery		1760	25 ha		
BaNanna Park		2010	0.5 ha		
Folkets Park					
Hans Tavsens Park			2.6 ha		
Jewish Cemetery		1694	1.4 ha		
Nørrebroparken					
Superkilen		2012			

== Østerbro ==
Parks and open spaces in Frederiksberg Municipality:

Name	Image	Created	Size	Location	Ref
Churchill Park		1965	2 ha		
Fælled Park		1906	58 ha		
Garrison's Cemetery		1664	32 ha		
Kastellet		1662			
Kildevæld Park			3.7 ha		
Langelinie Park		1894			
Ryvangen Memorial Park			17 ha		
Ryvangens Naturpark					
Svanemølle Beach					

== Valby ==
Parks and open spaces in the Valby district of Copenhagen:

Name	Image	Created	Size	Location	Ref
Valbyparken		1939	64 ha		
Vigerslevparken			49.5 ha		

== Vesterbro/Kongens Enghave ==
Parks and open spaces in the Vesterbro and Kongens Enghave districts of Copenhagen:

Name	Image	Created	Size	Location	Ref
Enghaveparken		1929	4 ha		
J. C. Jacobsen Garden		1849	4 ha		
Skydebanehaven		1949	1.5 ha		
Sønder Boulevard		2007	32 ha		
Vestre Cemetery		1870	54 ha		

== Suburbs ==
=== Gentofte Municipality ===
Name	Image	Created	Size	Location	Ref
Bellevue Beach					
Bernstorff Park					
Charlottenlund Beach Park					
Dyssegårdsparken		1950			
Gentofte Cemetery					
Gentofte Lake					
Gentofte Park					
Hellerup Cemetery					
Hvidøre Strandpark					
Hvidøre Strandpark		1943			
Mariebjerg Cemetery					
Ordrup Cemetery					
Øregård Park					
Strandlund		1973			
Strandlund		1973			
Søholmslund					
Vamgede Batteri					
Vamgede Batteri					

== See also ==
- List of squares in Copenhagen
