= Districts of Copenhagen =

Copenhagen administrative districts

Districts of Copenhagen are often based on informal designations based on historic origins, often with alternative names and loosely defined boundaries. Copenhagen Municipality is divided into 10 official administrative districts but they often comprise areas of a heterogeneous character which are informally not seen as one district. Some districts have earlier been official subdivisions and thus have semi-official boundaries. Copenhagen postal code designations often correspond to district boundaries but in some cases differ from them, as an example parts of the city centre has the postal code København V which is generally associated with Vesterbro.

== Official districts ==
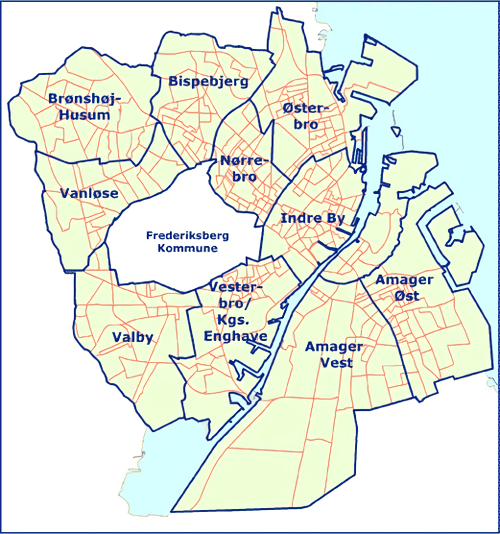
The ten districts of Copenhagen, surrounding Frederiksberg

Copenhagen Municipality has ten official administrative districts. They are: Indre By, Vesterbro/Kongens Enghave, Nørrebro, Østerbro, Amager Øst, Amager Vest, Valby, Bispebjerg, Vanløse and Brønshøj-Husum.

The districts serve administrative, statistical and tax purposes but are not boroughs since they are not self-governing, electoral or legislative subdivisions.

== -bro districts ==
In Copenhagen, -bro districts (Danish: Brokvarterer) refers to a ring of dense, residential neighbourhoods surrounding the city centre, named for their common suffix -bro. The -bro districts include Vesterbro, Nørrebro, Østerbro and Amagerbro on the northernmost part of Amager. The inner part of Frederiksberg, though an independent municipality and not sharing the same suffix, is often also considered a -bro district.

They developed in the second half of the 19th century and the beginning of the 20th century after the demarcation line around the city's old fortifications had been released and the fortifications decommissioned.

The four -bro districts correspond to the four former city gates Vesterport, Nørreport, Østerport and Amagerport, outside which they rose.

Through each -bro district run a -bro street (Danish: Brogade): Vesterbrogade, Nørrebrogade, Østerbrogade and Amagerbrogade. They extend from the location of the old city gates and used to be country roads, leading in and out of town, but as the new districts rose, they were urbanized and turned into busy shopping streets.

== Other districts and neighbourhoods ==
Copenhagen is divided into numerous other informal districts, neighbourhoods and areas, some of which are well-defined by geographical or historical boundaries while others are not.

=== Indre By ===
Zealand side

- Middelalderbyen
  - Latin Quarter
- New Copenhagen
  - Frederiksstaden
  - Nyboder
- Gammelholm
- Slotsholmen
- Nørrevold, Østervold and Vestervold

Amager side

- Christianshavn
  - Asiatisk Plads
  - Wilders Plads
  - Krøyers Plads
  - Nordatlantisk Brygge
- Holmen

=== Amager ===
- Amager East
  - Amagerbro
  - Sundbyøster
- Amager West
  - Islands Brygge
  - Ørestad
  - Sundbyvester
    - Eberts Villaby

=== Vesterbro ===
- The Meatpacking District
- Humleby
- Carlsberg
- Kalvebod Brygge
- Havneholmen

=== Kongens Enghave ===
- Sydhavnen
  - Sluseholmen
  - Teglholmen

=== Valby ===
- Vigerslev

=== Østerbro ===
- Amerika Plads
- Nordhavn
- Ryparken
- Søndre Frihavn
