= Lergravsparken =

Park in Copenhagen Municipality, Denmark

Lergrav Park
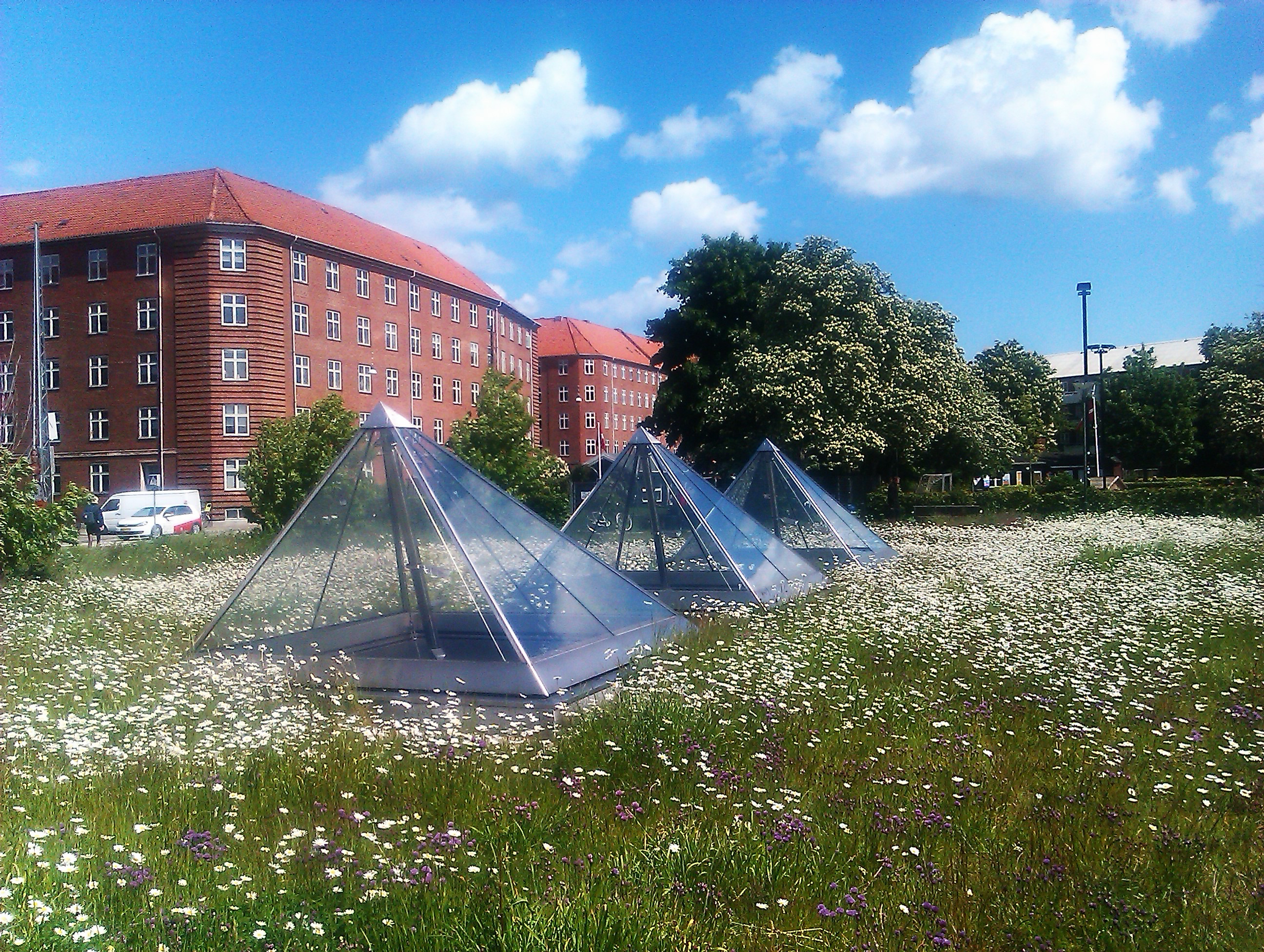
- Skylights of the metro station in a corner of the park

- Location within Denmark
- Location: East Amager, Copenhagen
- Coordinates: 55°39′42″N 12°37′08″E
- Created: 1930s
- Open: All year

Lergravsparken (lit. 'the Clay Pit Park') is a public park situated on the north side of Øresundsvej in the East Amager district of Copenhagen, Denmark. It is bounded by Østrigsgade to the west, Lergravsvej to the north and Strandlodsvej to the east. Lergravsparken metro station is located in a corner of the park. Lergravparkens Skole, a public primary school, is located just west of the park.

== History ==
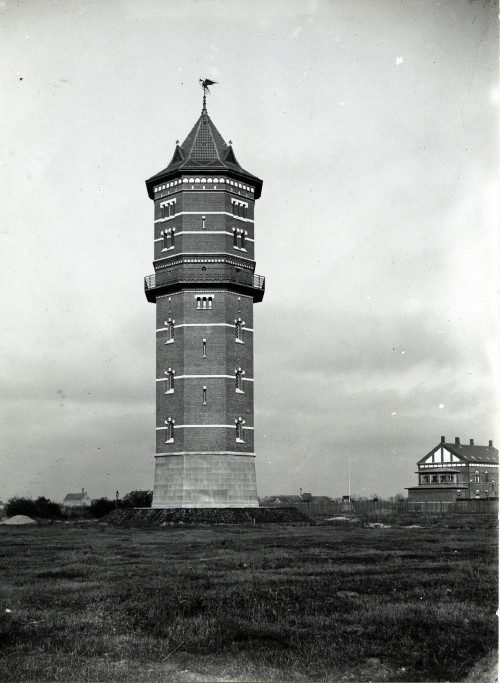
Sundby Water Tower in 1902

The park takes its name after a series of clay pit which was located at the site in the 19th century. The oldest part of the park is the former Sundbyøster Remise, a remise being a small grove where the game could seek shelter or feed. Sundby Water and Gasworks was established on the west side of Strandlodsvej in 1898. Sundby Water Tower was built in 1900. The area was first laid out as a park in 1905. It was then called Sundby Park or Sundby Anlæg. The public primary school Lergravsparkens Skole (later Sundparken Skole and now Lergravsparkens Skole) was built on the southwestern corner of Østrigsgade with Lergravsvej in 1918.

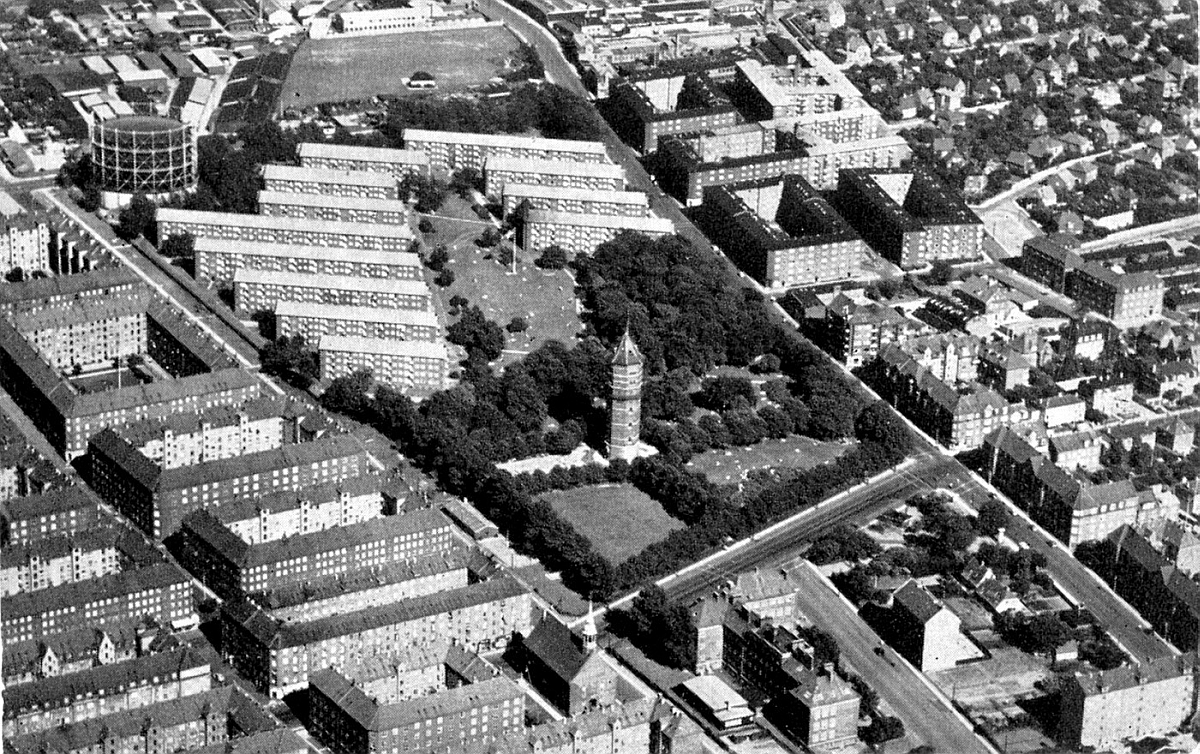
Aerial of the park from c. The watertower, gasometer and Sundbyparken Housing Estate is clearly visible

The gasworks closed in 1937 and its buildings were demolished except for the oldest and largest of the two gasometers which remained in use, now operated from Valby Gasworks. The park received its current name in 1938 and the gasworks site in its eastern end was built over with a modernist housing estate, Sundparken, consisting of 12 apartment buildings with one and two-room apartments for senior citizens. A system of bunkers was built in the park during World War II. The watertower stood in the park until it was demolished with dynamite in 1967. The surviving gasometer was demolished in 1972.

== Today ==
A playground is located in the northern section of the park. Sundbyøster Reimse is still seen in a corner of the park where it is surrounded by approximately one metre high stone walls made of large boulders. The former bunkers have been adapted for use as rehearsal rooms for local musicians.

== See also ==
- List of parks and open spaces in Copenhagen
