= Sundby, Copenhagen =

Neighbourhood in Copenhagen, Denmark

Coordinates: 55°39′N 12°37′E

Sundby
- Neighbourhood
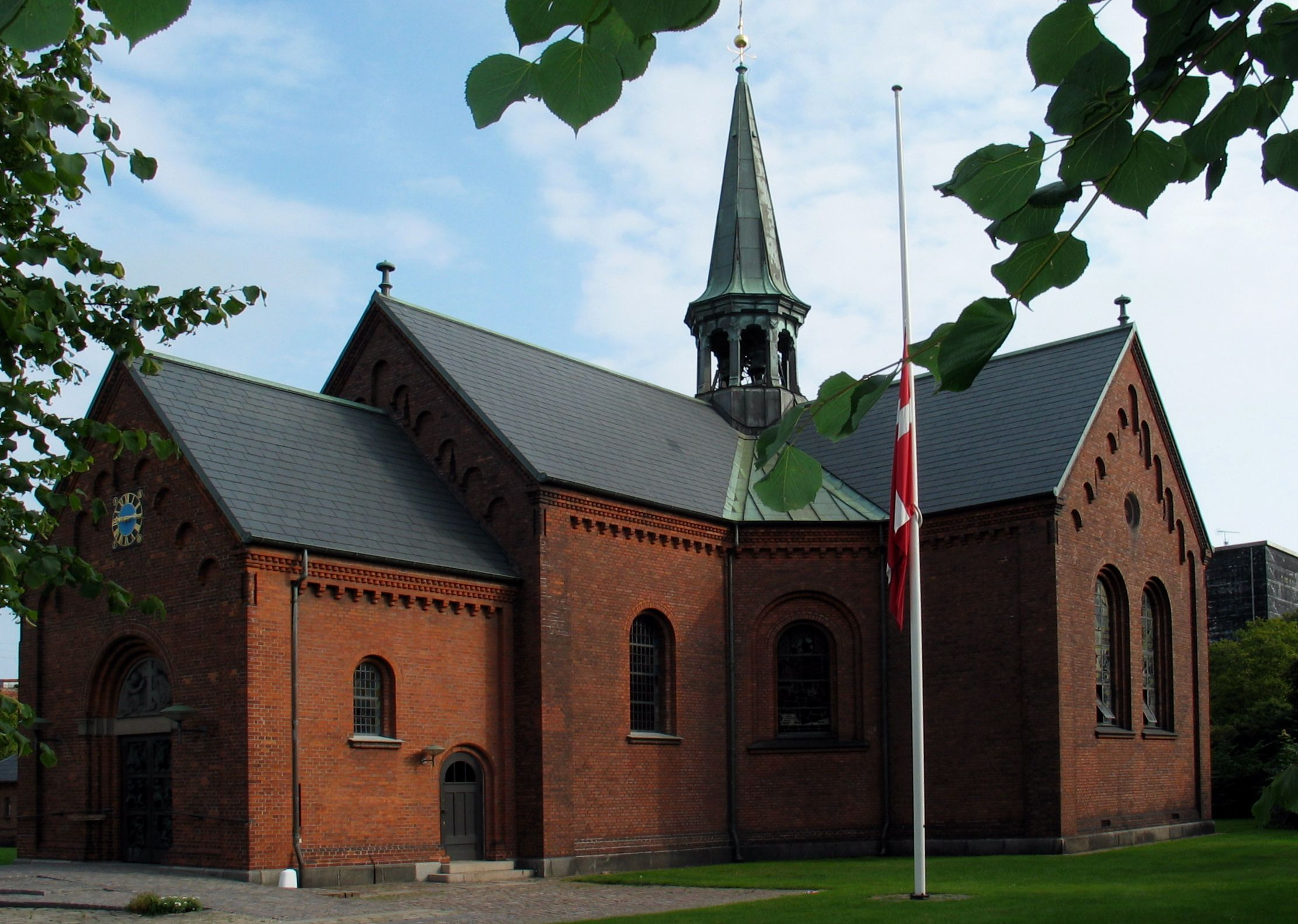
- Sundby Church, inaugurated in 1870
- Nickname: Sundbyerne
- Interactive map of Sundby
- Country: Denmark
- Municipality: Copenhagen
- District: Amager Vest

Sundby is a neighbourhood on Amager in Copenhagen, Denmark. It is often also referred to as Sundbyerne (plural form) since a distinction is traditionally made between Sundbyvester (Sundby West) and Sundbyøster (Sundby East), located on each their side of Amagerbrogade.

== History ==
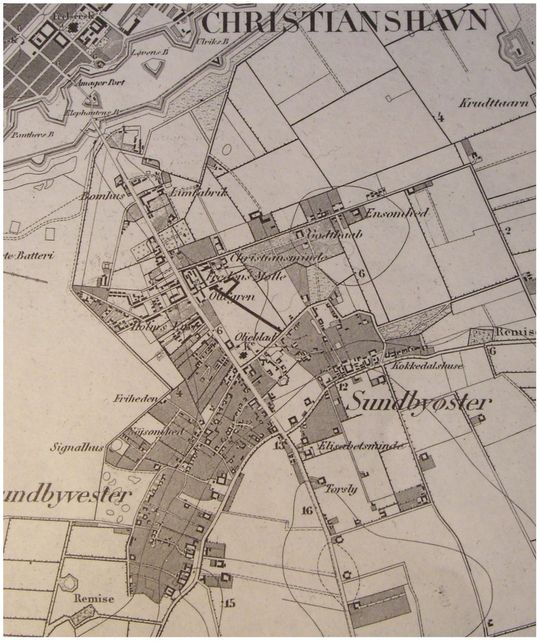
Sundbyvester and Sundbyøster in 1865

=== Early history ===
Sundbyvester (Sundby occidentali) and Sundbyøster (Sundby orientali) were originally two villages known from about 1100. They consisting of two rows of farmsteads extending from Amager Road, now Amagerbrogade, roughly where present day Øresundsvej and Englandsvej are found today, separating their farm land to the south from their pastures to the north. In the second half of the 18th century, the area changed character when sailors, craftsmen and workers began to settle in the community which spread along the main road.

Administratively, Sundby belonged to the civil parish of Tårnby. In 1793, the northnmost part of the area, Amagerbro, was transferred to Copenhagen whose so-called Demarcation Line, which heavily restricted construction within a certain distance from the city walls, kept development to a minimum.

=== 19th century ===
Up through the 19th century, Sundby became home to an increasing number of manufactories and workshops, often from Christianshavn, which moved out of the city in search of more room in the face of increasing industrialization. An early example of this was Jacob Holm, who purchased several pieces of land on both sides of the main road between 1808 and 1812, establishing both a smock mill operating an oil-press, a glue manufactury and a rope walk on it.

The differences between urban Sundby and rural Tårnby grew still larger and led to conflicts over matters such as schools, sewers and street maintenance. In the 1890 census, Sundbyerne had a population of 13,310.

In 1895 when Sundby was finally disjoined from Tårnby.

=== 20th century ===
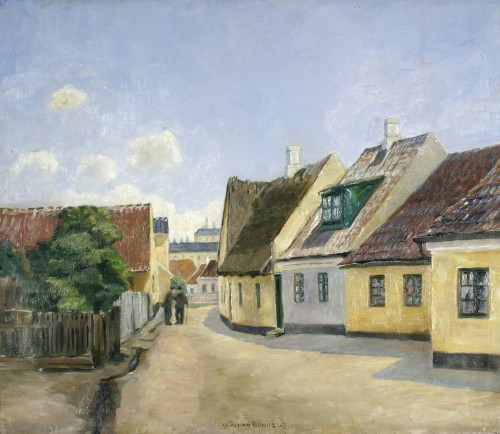
A street in Sundby, probably Islandsgade, painted 1923 by Johan Rohde

Sundby's status as an independent civil parish (sognekommune) only lasted for seven years. Its population skyrocketed in the years around 1900 when many workers moved to the area from Copenhagen, and it was from the beginning faced with economic, social and sanitary challenges, leading to its merger into Copenhagen in 1902.
