= Eberts Villaby =

Coordinates: 55.6556°N 12.6083°E

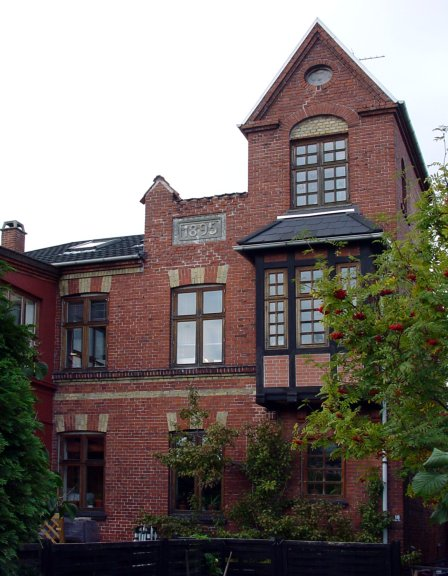
A house in Eberts Villaby

Eberts Villaby (literally "Ebert's Villa Town") is an enclave of late 19th-century detached houses situated just off Amagerbrogade in the otherwise more dense Sundby district on Amager in Copenhagen, Denmark.

== History ==
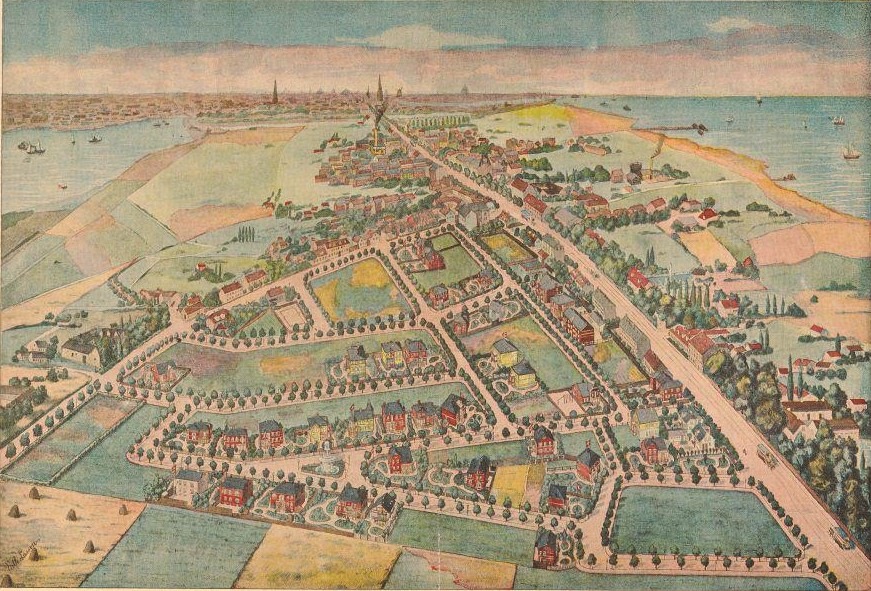
Eberts Villaby on a drawing by Franz Šedivý from 1896

The development takes its name after Herman Ebert who acquired a farm at the site in 1894. He constructed a fountain at the centre of the development, a pumping station at its highest point and began the construction of houses which he sold to members of the Copenhagen middle class as they were completed. The Association of House Owners in Sundbyvester ( Foreningen af Villaejere i Villabyen I Sundbyvester)was founded on 1 September 1896. The original plans for the area also included a community house with a conditorie but it was given up in 1897 due to an estimated cost of DKK 30,000. The last houses were completed in 1898 and water and gas was installed in 1899.

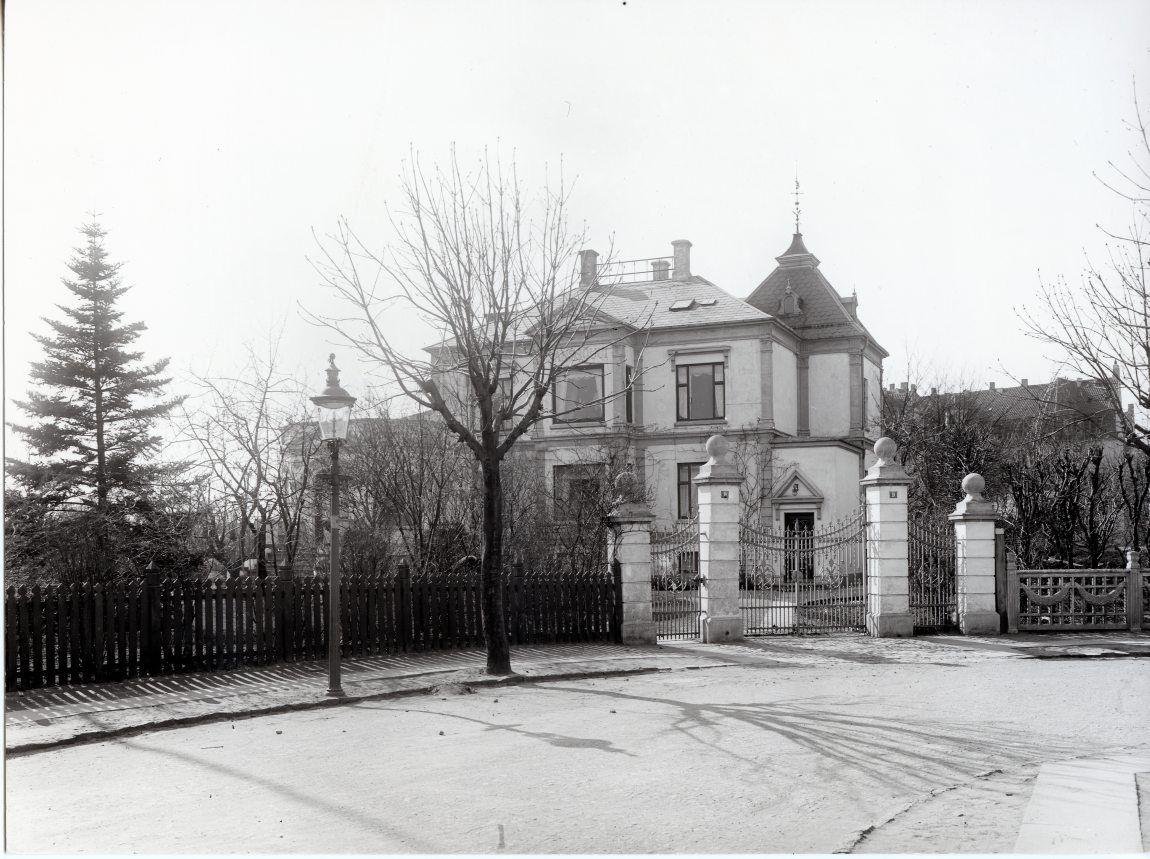
Herman Ebertøs Villa "Sans Souci" at Christians II's Plads 9.

In 1907, Herman Ebert ceded ownership of the fountain and street network to the Association of House Owners and electricity was installed in all houses.

In 1925, the Association of House Owners changed its name to Eberts Villaby. One of the houses was expropriated and subsequently demolished in connection with an expansion of Englandsvej from 10 to 22 metres. Another four houses were demolished in 1956 as a consequence of a building project on Amagerbrogade.

== Street names ==
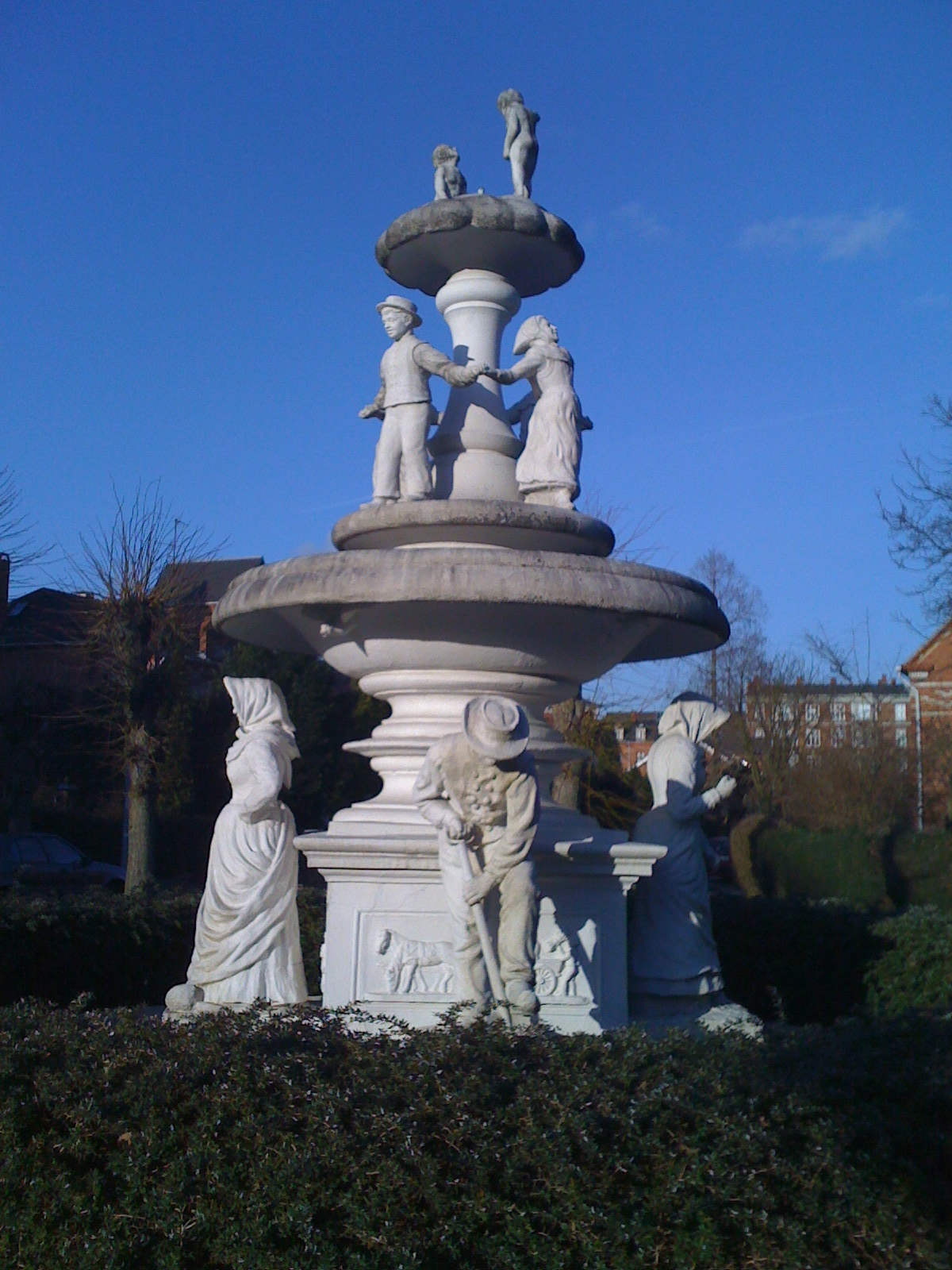
The fountain

Ebert launched a public competition for the naming of the streets which was created with the establishment of the new neighbourhood. The names were announced on 14 April 1895 and commemorate persona from the time of king Christian II's reign:

- Christian II's Allé – King Christian II
- Dronning Elisabeths Alle
- Dyvekes Alleé – Dyveke Sigbritsdatter
- Sigbrit s allé – Sigbrit Willoms
- Skipper Clements Alle – Skipper Clement
- Hans Bogbinders Allé – Hans Bogbinder

== The area today ==
The houses are built in the Historicist style which was popular in Denmark at the time. Many houses are named after prominent historic buildings (such as Rosenborg, Rosenvold), localities (Hindsholm, a peninsula off Funen). Herman Ebert's own villa, Sans Souci, which is inspired by Franz Joseph I of Austria's summer residence in Bad Ischl.

== Cultural references ==
Birgitte Nyborgs and Phillip lives on Christian II's Alle in Eberts Villaby in the DR television series Borgen.

== Image gallery ==
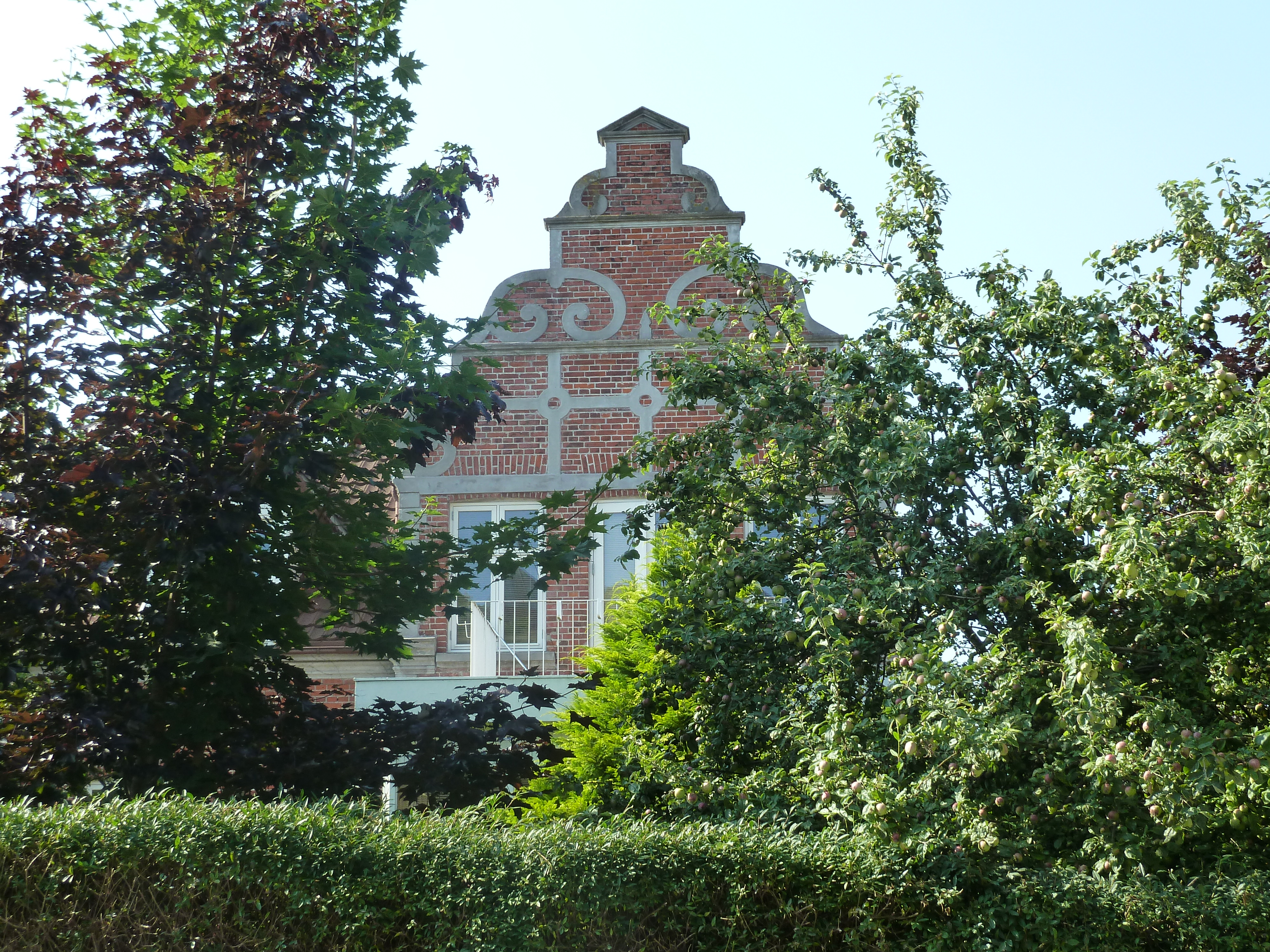

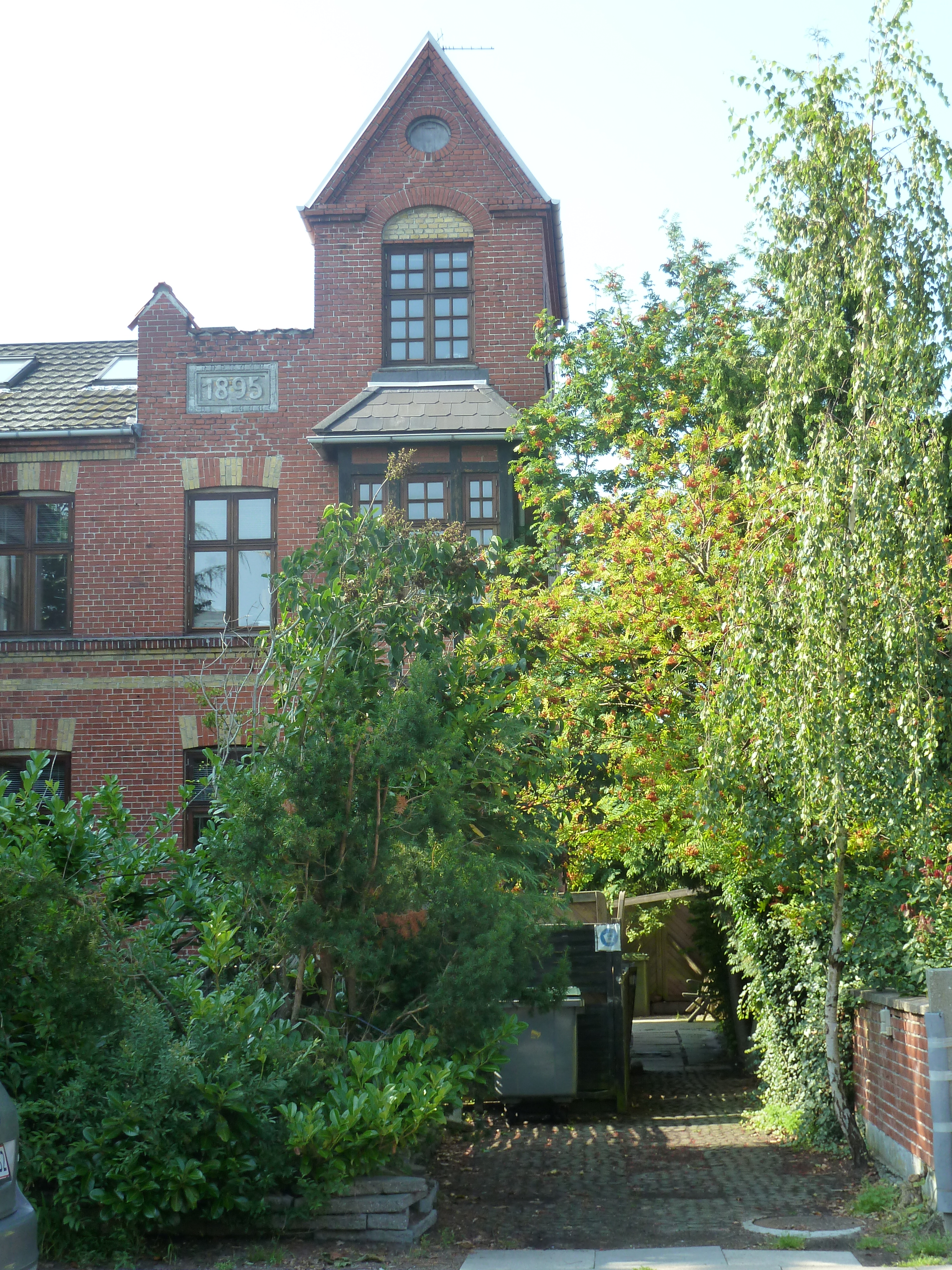

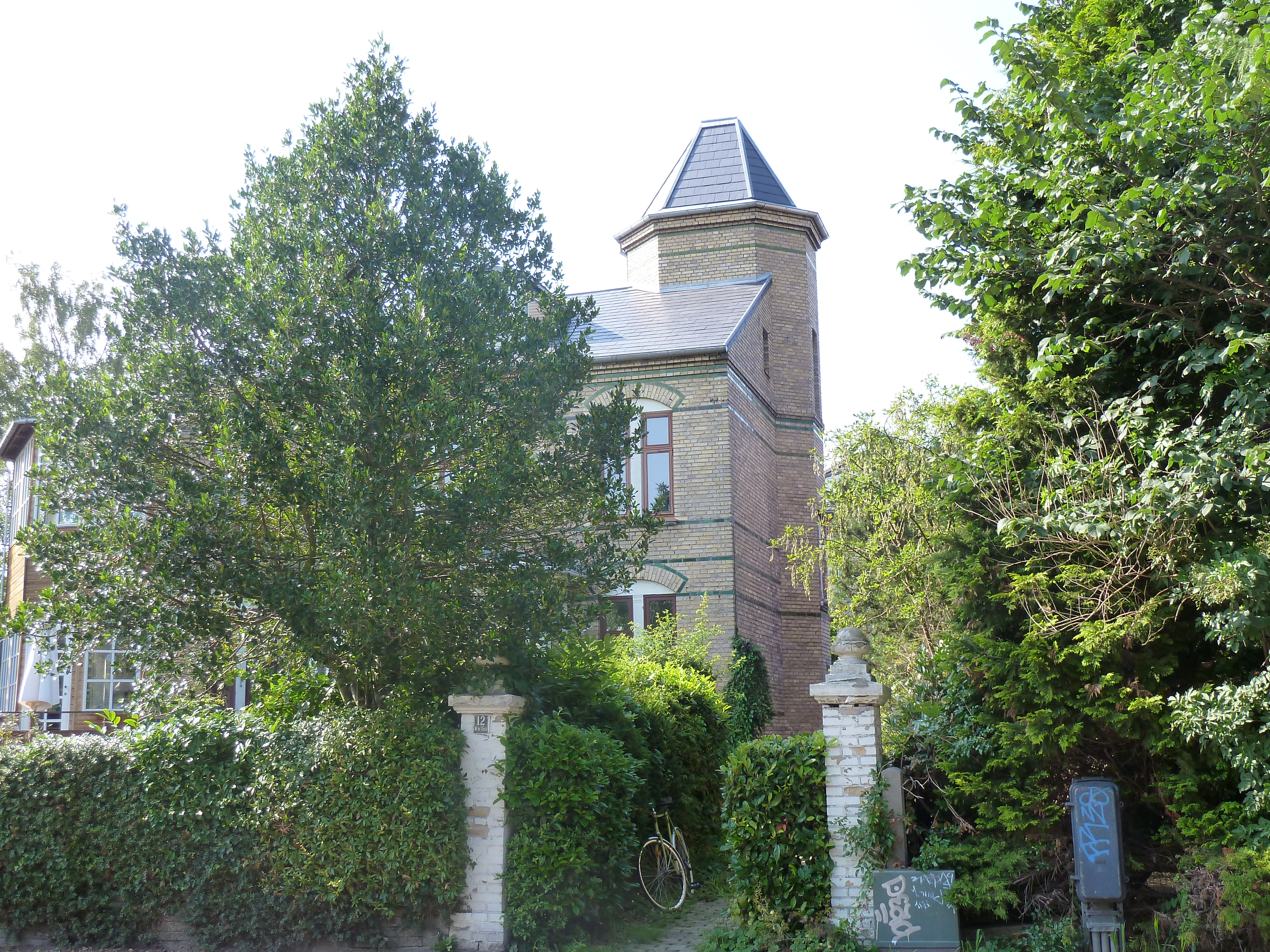

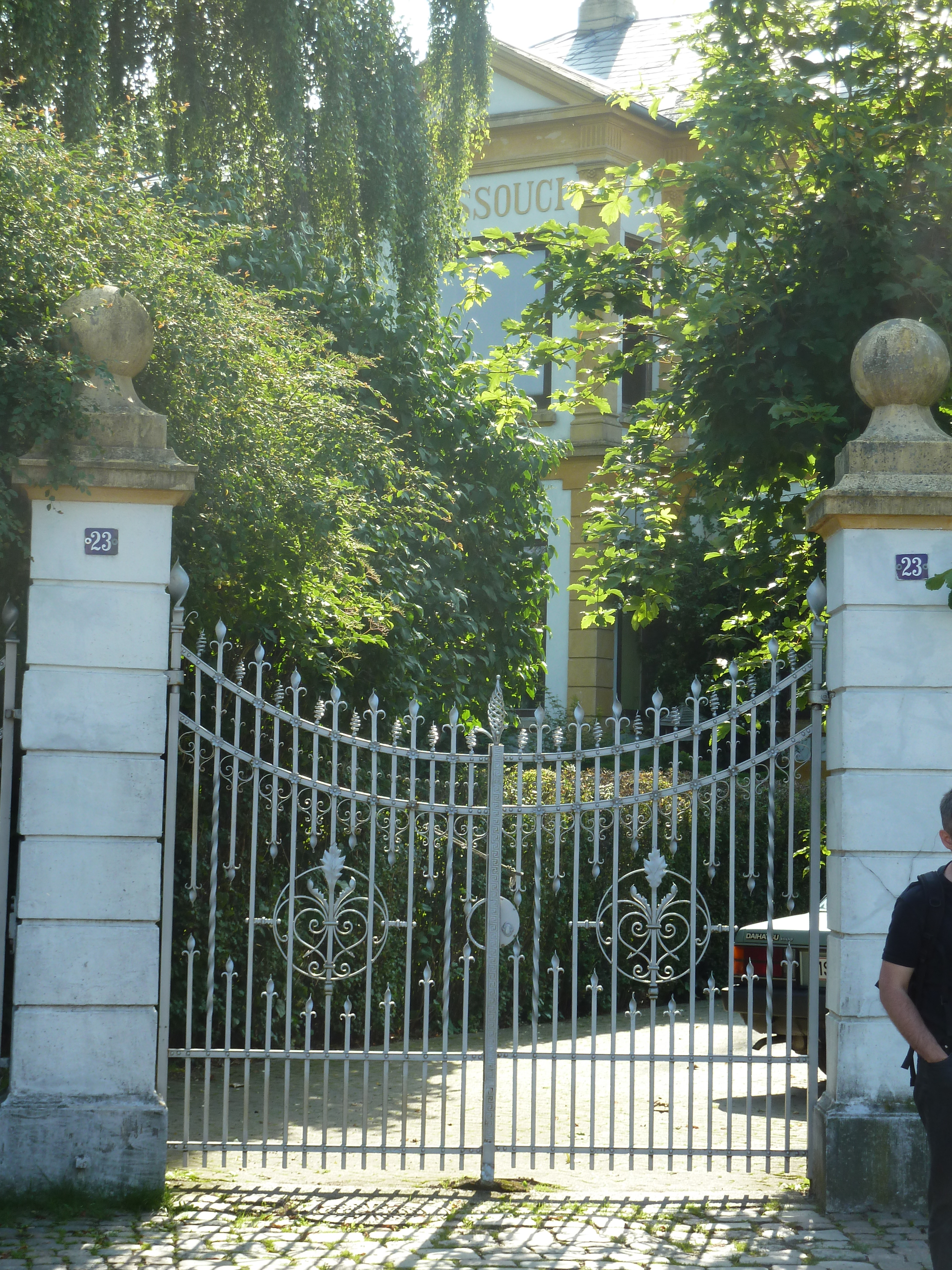

== Bibliography ==
- Housted, Erik: En matador på Amager. Ama´r, 1996.

== See also ==
- Ryvangen
