= Johan C. Schwarz-Nielsen =

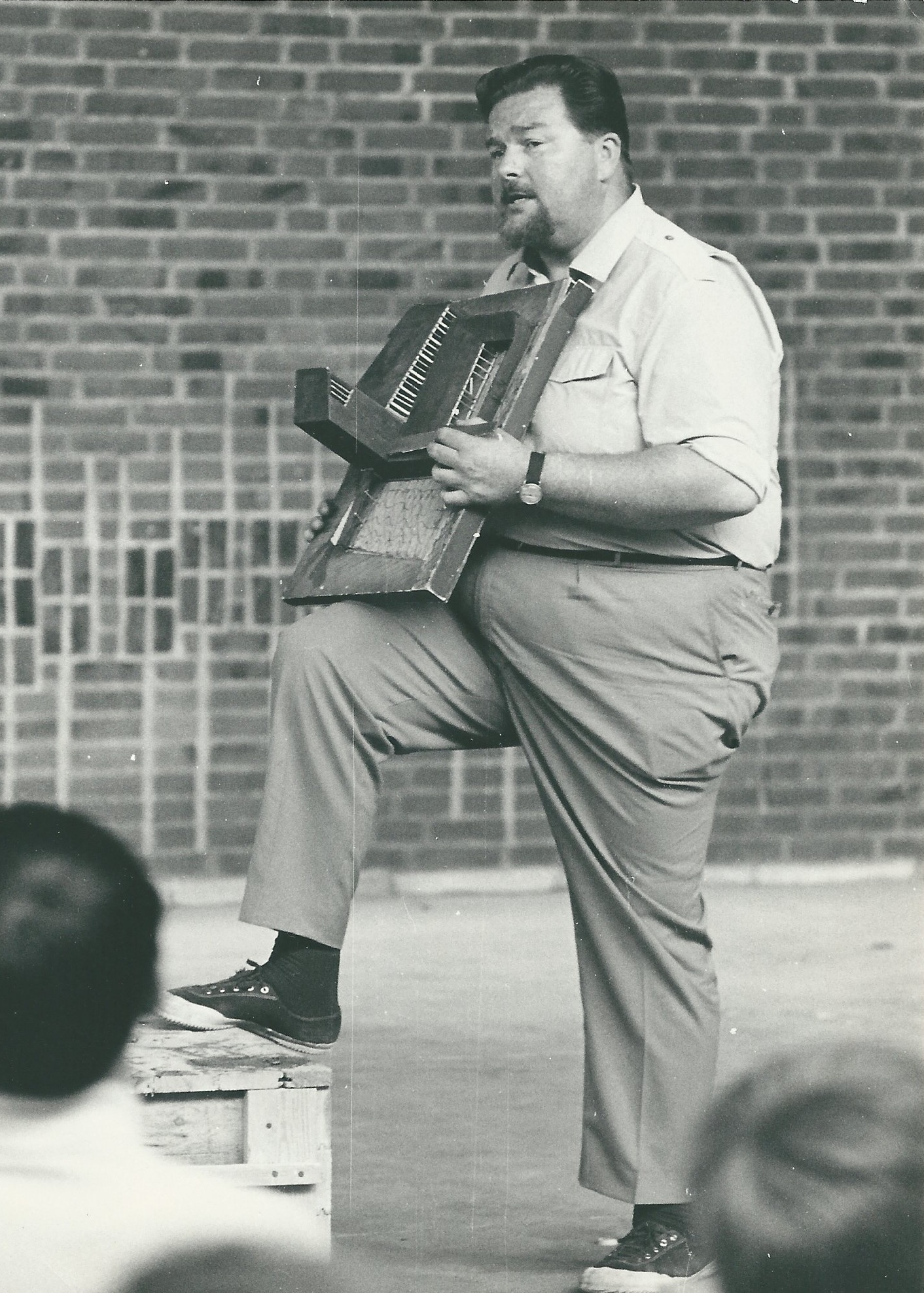
- Born: April 19, 1924; Sundby, Amager, Copenhagen
- Died: November 7, 1987 (aged 63); Bistrup, Birkerød Kommune, Copenhagen

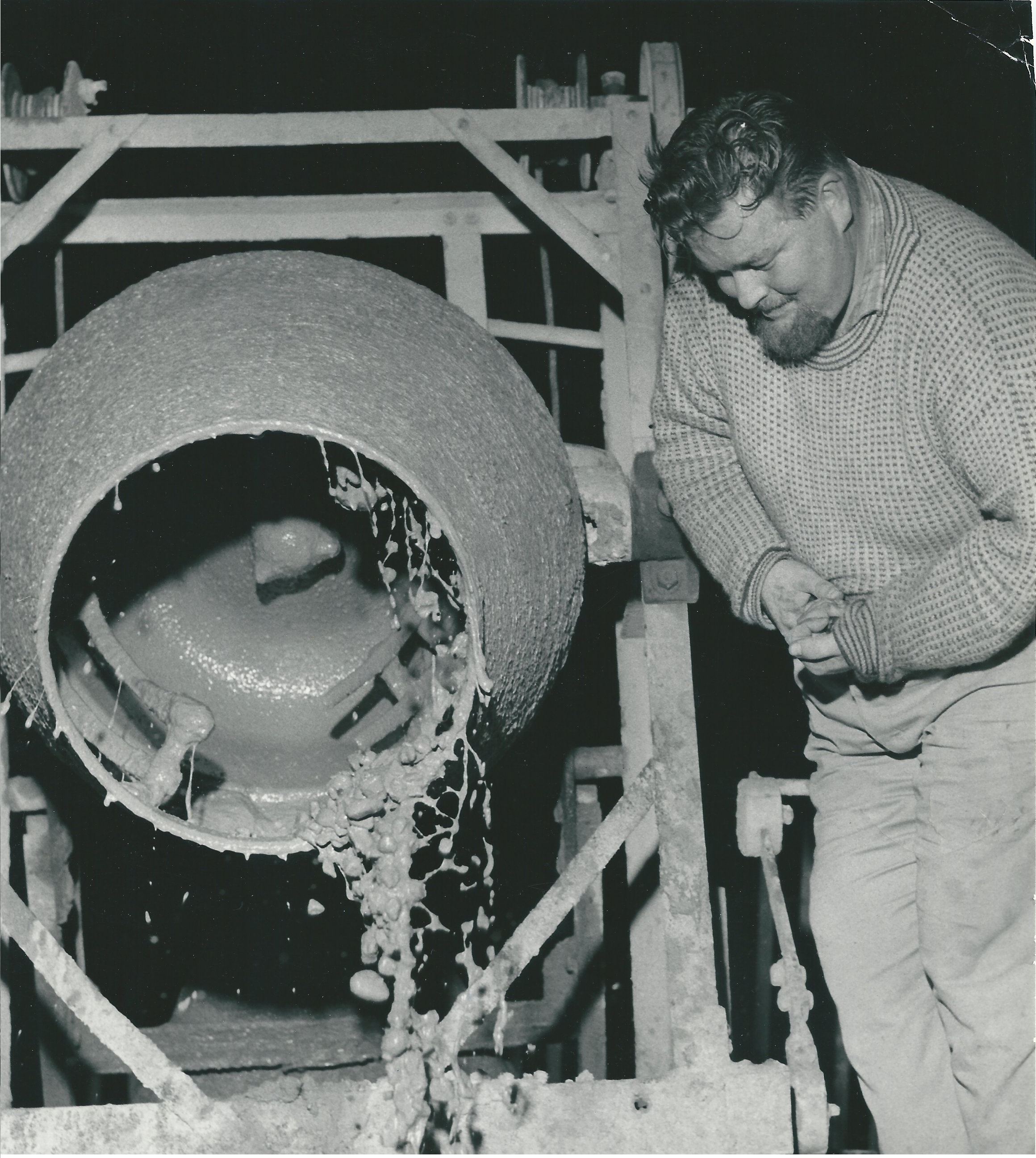
Johan at the building site

Johan Christoffer Schwarz-Nielsen (April 19, 1924 – November 7, 1987) was a vicar in Bistrup Parish, Bistrup Sogn, North of Copenhagen from the creation of the parish in 1963 until his death in 1987.

== Life ==
A ban on building of public buildings (caused by shortage of labour) came into effect in 1962, which meant that the planned building of Bistrup Church had to be postponed. Schwarz-Nielsen gathered a group of volunteers from the parish, 120 in total, so they could build the church themselves, an approach that not attempted in Denmark for some 800 years. Originally they were only aiming at building part of the ground floor of the church, which was completed in 1963, but as they were proceeding well they continued for another four years with the main part containing the church room proper and the 21 meters tall tower. Subsequently, Johan took the initiative for helping to build several buildings, including the 'Henrik Gerners Børnehaven' kindergarten between 1970 and 1973; 'Gerner Salen', an annex to the church between 1978 and 1979; and the 'Marie Gerner Gården' creche from 1979 to 1981. All these projects were organised as independent non-profit organisations and the necessary funds were mainly collected in the parish for these specific purposes. In 1982 Johan went to Cyprus as Army Chaplain with the peacekeeping Danish DANCON UN-contingent, a natural continuation of his service in Akademisk Skytteforening, O-gruppe 2, during the Occupation of Denmark 1940–1945.

=== Family ===
Johan married Bente (née Blichmann) in 1949. They had three sons.

== Charitable work ==
Johan was involved in a range of charitable work at local and national level. He was from 1982 and, through to his death, Chairman of Børnehjælpsdagen, a country-wide charity for children. Between 1968 and 1969 he was Chairman of the Board for Lions Club Denmark, and he was Chairman of Lion club's Catastrophe and Emergency Foundation from 1983 until his death.

== Sources ==
- Berlingske Aftenavis, April 15, 1967, s.14
- Kristeligt Dagblad, August 18, 1967
- Kristeligt Dagblad, April 18, 1974
