= Nielsen & Winther =

Danish manufacturer

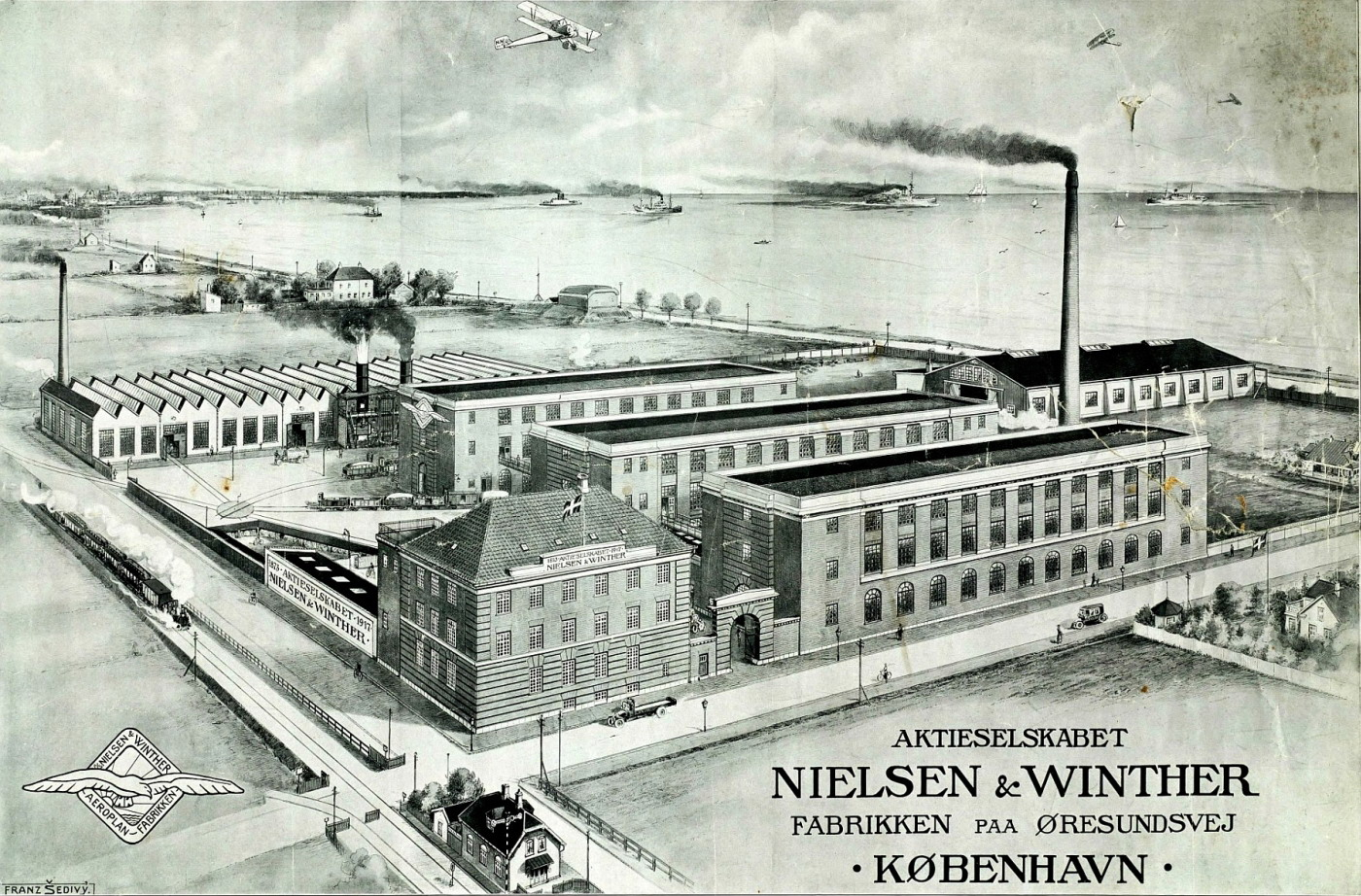
- Type: Private limited company
- Headquarters: Øresundsvej, Amager, Copenhagen, Denmark
- Products: Aircraft, Machinery

Nielsen & Winther was a Danish machine factory and aeroplane manufacturer based in Copenhagen, Denmark.

== History ==
The machine factory was founded in 1873. It was from 1899 to 1916 based in a building at Blegdamsvej 60 designed by Axel Berg. It would later relocate to a new building designed by Frederik Wagner at Ryesgade 51-55 as well as a large new plant at Øresundsvej 147.

In 1921, Nielsen & Winther sold $3 million (equivalent to $54,151,119 in 2025) worth of lathes, hydraulic presses, and other machinery for production of armaments to Chinese warlord Zhang Zuolin. The company would also send advisers to assist with the production of artillery shells and ammunition. In November 1926, during the Northern Expedition, they would supply Zhang's forces with further deliveries of war materiel.

== Aircraft production ==
The Amager plant was home to a new aeroplane division. It delivered six Nielsen & Winther Type Aa aeroplanes to the Royal Danish Air Force in 1917. One aircraft was delivered to the Royal Norwegian Navy Air Service in 1918. Three of the six Danish aircraft crashed in accidents, and the three remaining ones were therefore grounded. The Amager plant was sold to Vølund in 1920.

Aircraft produced by Nielsen & Winther:

Aa - c/n N&W.1
1-seat fighter with 90 hp (67 kW) Thulin A engine, delivered 15 January 1917, withdrawn from use 31 March 1919.
Aa - c/n N&W.2
crashed 17 December 1917.
Aa - c/n N&W.3
crashed 19 Mar 1919.
Aa - c/n N&W.4
converted to ground trainer 31 March 1919, scrapped 1924.
Aa - c/n N&W.5
converted to ground trainer on 31 March 1919, scrapped 1924.
Aa - c/n N&W.6
crashed 17 October 1918.
Ab - c/n N&W.70
sold to A.Jarfeldt, a Danish/Argentinian pilot, exported to Argentina/Bolivia.
Ab - c/n N&W.71
completed but not delivered.
Ac
2-seat float-plane version of Aa (prototype) crashed at Øresund.
Bd
2-seat float plane 110 hp (82 kW) Scania-Vabis PD engine; exported to the Royal Norwegian Navy Air Service.
C
Two Bi-plane ground rolling trainers used by the Nielsen & Winther flying School.
D
4-seater “Tourist-biplane” 170 hp (127 kW) Nielsen & Winther M.A.J. engine; probably never flown.
E
planned Cargo aircraft 170 hp (127 kW) Nielsen & Winther M.A.J. engine; not built.
Fa
Sports flying-boat; sold to C.Hundinghouse Jensen.
Fa - c/n N&W.21
Sports flying-boat exported to Norway, registered as N1 to Einar Juell.

== Football club ==
Nielsen & Winther was also the name of a football club founded in 1918 by workers at the factory.

== Legacy ==
The company's former buildings at Blegdamsvej 60 and Ryesgade 51-55 have survived. The Amager plant, taken over by Vølund, was demolished in 2001. Its premises in the Free Port was taken over by Riffelsyndikatet.
