= Amagerbro =

Area in northern Amager island

Coordinates: 55°39′42″N 12°35′05″E

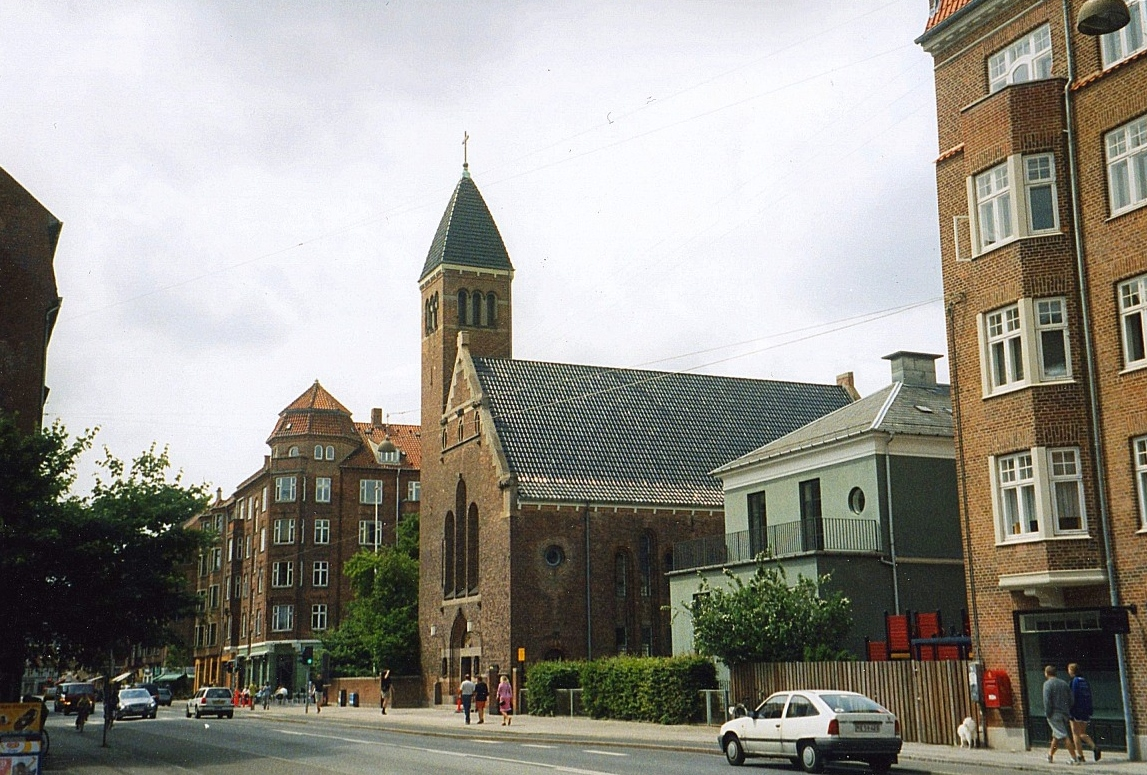

Amagerbro is an area in the northern part of the island Amager and a district in Copenhagen. The area is known as a working class area, and has approximately 20,000 inhabitants. The district has two metro stations, Amagerbro station and Lergravsparken station. Amagerbrogade, a main shopping street, runs through it.

The district is bordered by the Amager Fælled nature reserve, the Christianhavn Ramparts and Kløvermarken, the industrial area near Amager Boulevard and Øresundsvej. The main shopping and business area is Amagerbrogade and its sidestreets. Establishments in Amagerbro include Kofoeds School offering assistance to people with social problems, the Sundholm Activity Centre accommodating the homeless for short periods, and The Royal School of Library and Information Science with some 800 students.
