= Øresundsvej =

Øresundsvej is a street in the East Amager district of Copenhagen, Denmark. It runs from Amagerbrogade in the west to Amager Strandvej in the east.

== History ==
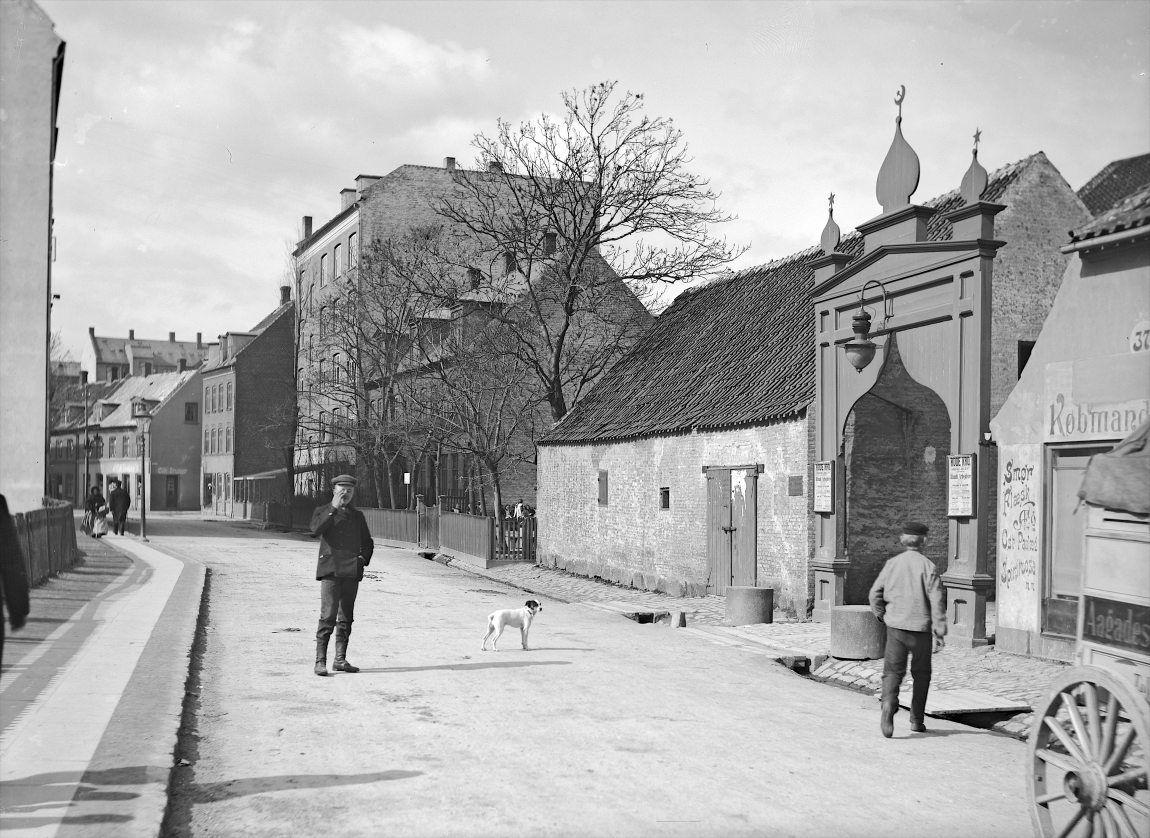
Øresundsvej in 1907 with the local fire station

Øresundsvej is the old main street of the village of Sundbyøster. All the farms of the village lined the street in a row, with cultivated land on one side and pastures on the other. The street began to change in 1755 when a royal charter allowed craftsmen and sailors to settle in Sundby Øster and Sundbyvester. The surrounding farmland was sold off in lats in the late 19th century.

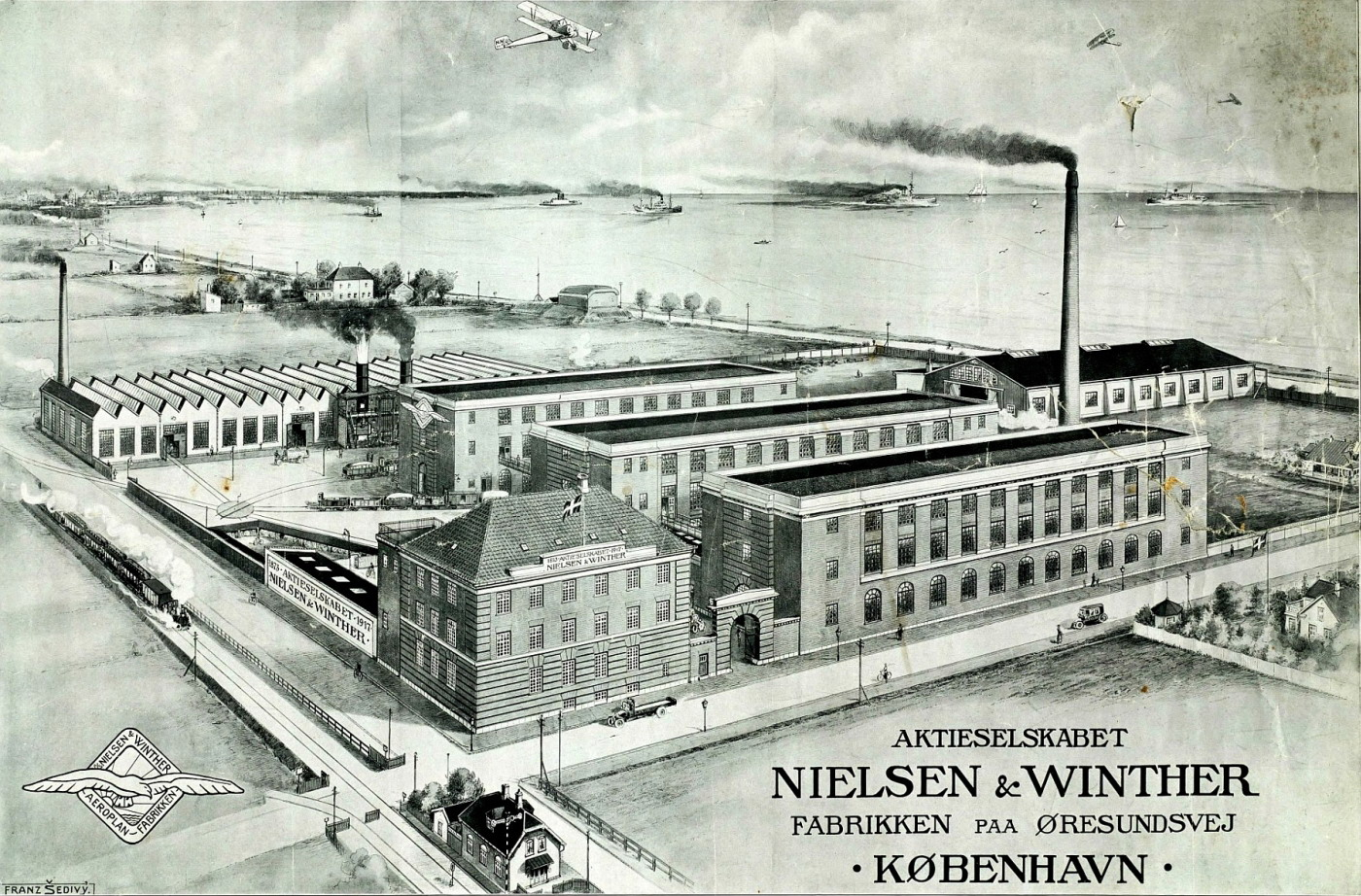
Nielsen & Winther's plant seen on an advertisement from circa 1920

The first part of the street was gradually built over with taller buildings after the turn of the century. Several large industrial plants opened at the far end of the street in the 1910s and 1920s. One of them, was Nielsen & Winther, a machine factory and aeroplane manufacturer previously based on Blegdamsvej. The company inaugurated a large factory at Øresundsvej 147 in 1917. The complex was designed by Frederik Wagner. Just a few years later, in 1921, it was taken over by Vølund. NKT opened a large cable factory on a neighbouring site in 1908.

== Notable buildings ==
Amager Kulturpunkt (No. 6), is a local cultural centre that comprises a number of different venues. Amager Bio, a music venue, is located in a former cinema from 1941. Ama'r is a cultural centre specially for children.

== Transport ==
Two metro stations, Lergravsparken and Øresund, north of the M2 line, are located on the street.
