= Amager Vest =

District of Copenhagen

Coordinates: 55°38′30″N 12°34′41″E

- Interactive map of Amager Vest
- Country: Denmark

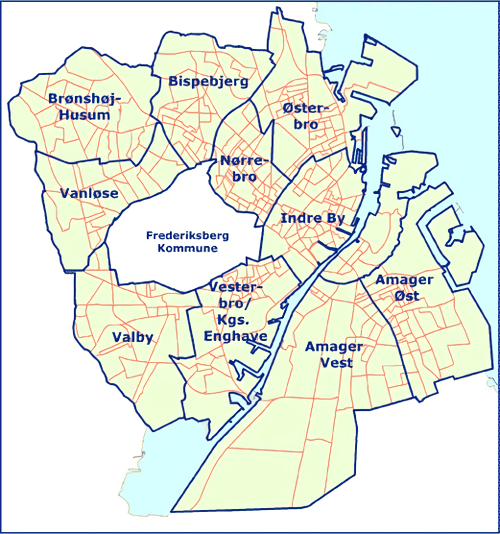
Ten districts of Copenhagen

Amager Vest (English: West Amager) is one of the ten administrative districts of Copenhagen Municipality, Denmark. It located on in the north-western part of the island of Amager, the largest island in the Øresund. The district is bordered by Amager Øst to the east along Amagerbrogade, the main shopping street and thoroughfare of the part of Copenhagen. Amager Vest is the largest of the ten new official administrative districts of Copenhagen, but has at the same time the smallest population. Only the most northern part can be considered as "urban area".

Amager Vest includes Islands Brygge, Ørestad, Sundbyvester and Eberts Villaby as well as the extensive meadow and wetlands of Kalvebod Fælled. The western part of Amager island is mainly an enlargement from shallow parts of the Øresund. The extension of western Amager began around 1930 and was finished around 1955. The main purpose was to give shelter to the southern parts of Copenhagen harbour. The enlargement is filled with rocks, sand from the sea, plaster and waste. Consequently the soil is too poor for agricultural matters.

The condition of the soil makes construction expensive there. The exhibition centre Bella Center (which hosted the environment meeting COP15 in December 2009) is one of very few exceptions from this.

== See also ==
- Districts of Copenhagen
