= Vesterbro/Kongens Enghave =

District of Copenhagen

Coordinates: 55.6667°N 12.5500°E

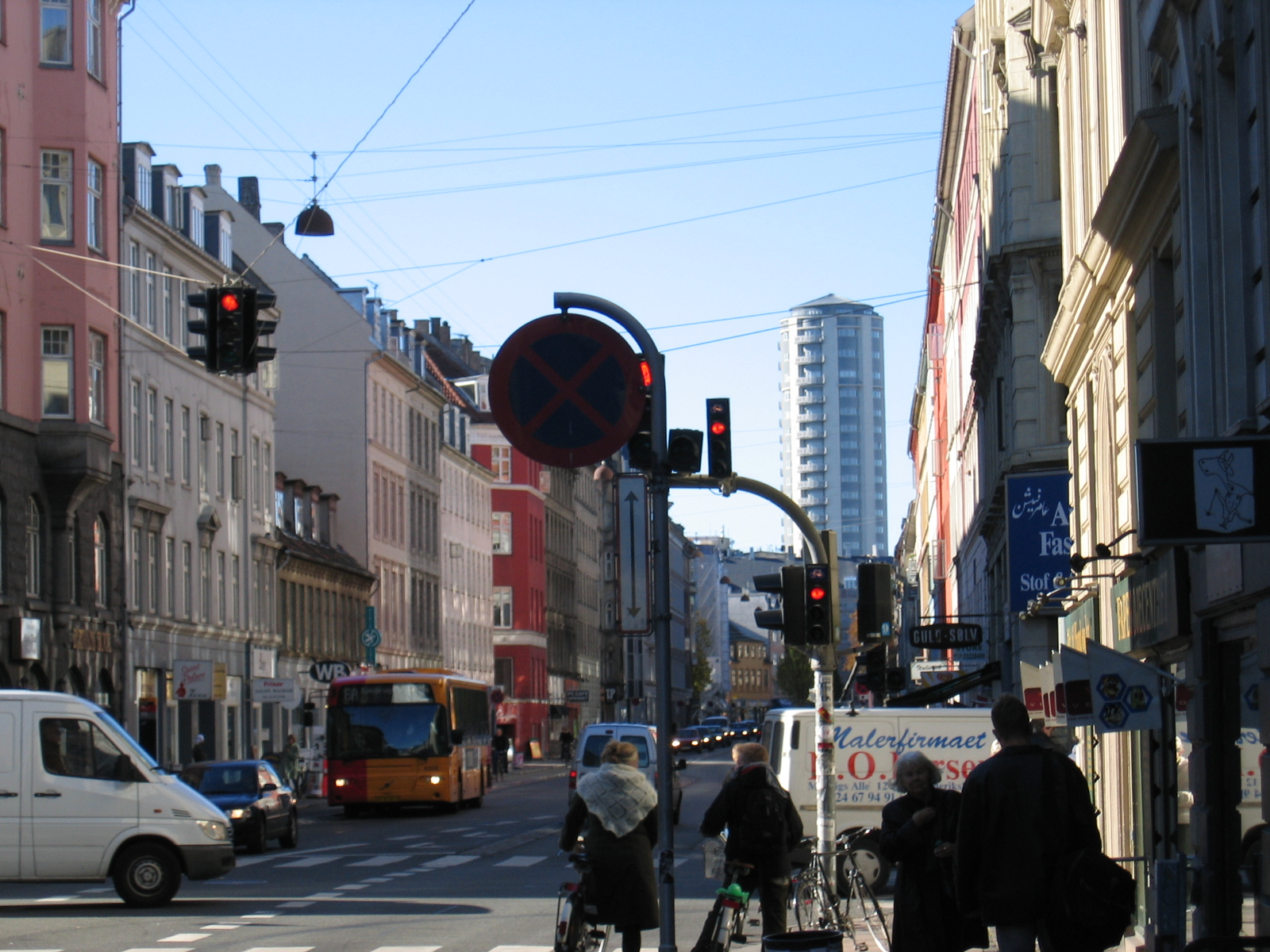
Vesterbrogade, with Kongens Bryghus in the distance

Vesterbro/Kongens Enghave is one of the 10 official districts of Copenhagen Municipality, Denmark. The district has an area of 8.22 km² and a population of 53,351.

== See also ==
- Vesterbro
- Kongens Enghave
