= Strandlund =

Strandlund is a surname. Notable people with the surname include:

- Carl Strandlund (1899–1974), Swedish-born American inventor and entrepreneur
- Jan Strandlund (born 1962), Swedish curler and curling coach
- Maria Strandlund (born 1969), Swedish tennis player
