= Amager Øst =

District of Copenhagen

Coordinates: 55.6625°N 12.6253°E

Amager Øst (English: Amager East) is one of the 10 official districts of Copenhagen Municipality, Denmark. It encompasses the part of Copenhagen located on the island of Amager, east of the major shopping street Amagerbrogade.Prior to an administrative reform in 2006–08, the district was known as Sundbyøster.

Amager Øst holds within its limits a heterogeneous mixture of areas, to the north Amagerbro, straddling the border with Amager Vest, is a dense "-bro district"-style residential neighbourhoods while other areas are dominated by allotments, Single-family houses or, sometimes abandoned, industrial sites. Amagerbro used to be a run-down working-class neighbourhood but has undergone considerable urban renewal. Also the areas along the Øresund coast has undergone considerable redevelopment, most notably with the establishment of Amager Strandpark in 2005 with a 2 km long artificial island and a total of 4.6 km of beaches.

== Geography ==
Amager Øst has an area of 8.60 km^{2} and a population of 49,705. The district is bordered by Amager Vest to the west along Amagerbrogade, Tårnby Municipality to the south and Øresund to the east. To the northwest Amager Øst is bordered by Christianshavn, located on the other side of the broad, former moat og Slotsgraven, and to the north by Holmen which is also located on the other side of the water.

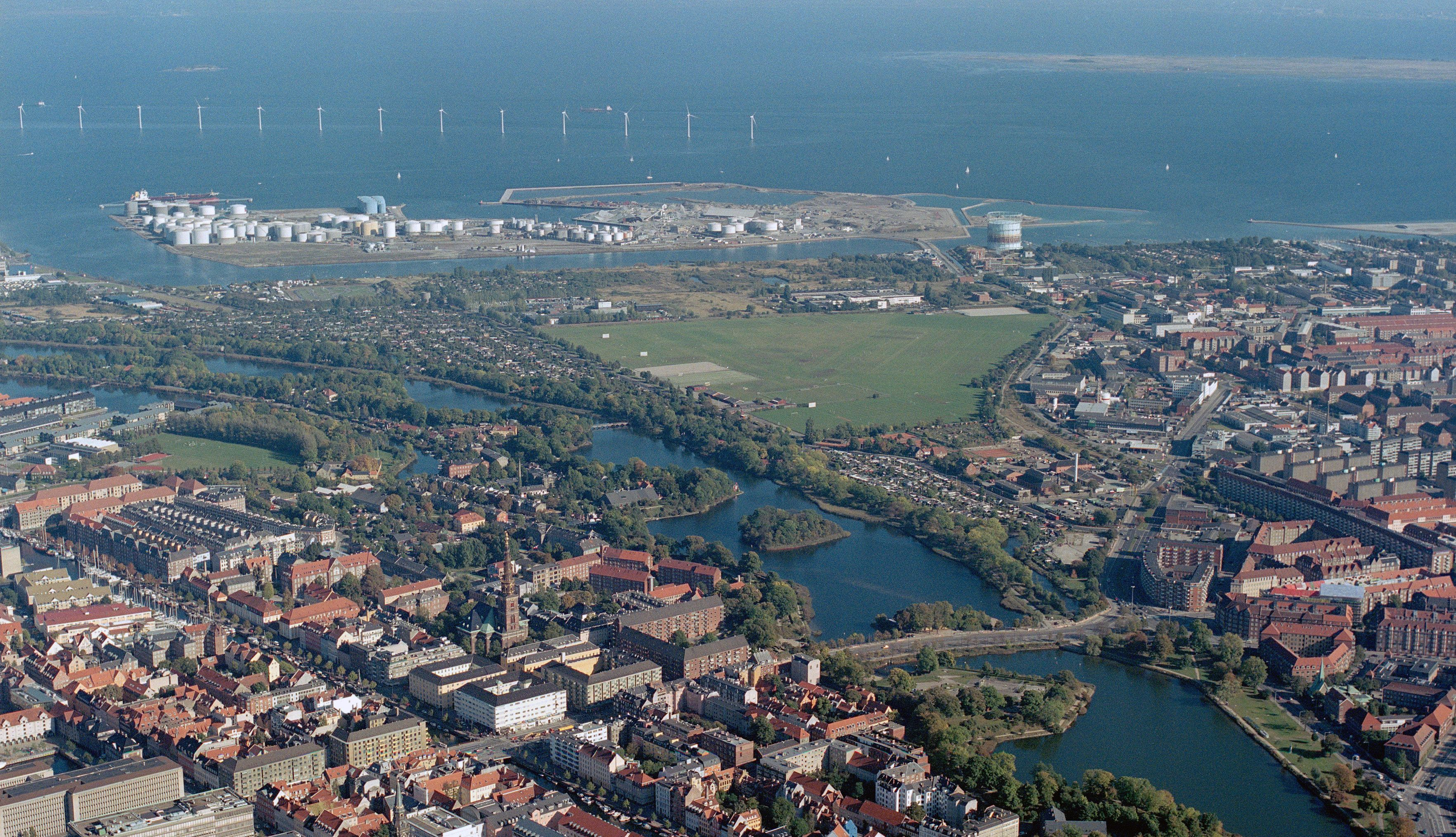

== History ==
Sundbyøster takes its name from a village in the area founded in the 11th century. By Royal order, Dutch crafts- and boatsmen were granted permission to settle in the area. This started an industrialization of the area, particularly around 1870. In 1902 the northern part of Amager was incorporated into Copenhagen Municipality and a dense working-class neighbourhood developed in the area around Holmbladsgade. By 1980 most industrial activities had been discontinued and the area became dominated by trade and service-oriented businesses. In 1997 a programme for urban refurbishment (Danish: Byfornyelse) of the area was commenced.

The M2 line of the Copenhagen Metro opened to Lergravsparken on October 18, 2002, and the extension to Copenhagen Airport was inaugurated in September 2007. Another important event in the district's modern history was the opening of Amager Strandpark in 2005. At the administrative reform in 2006–08, the district's name was changed from Sundbyøster to Amager Øst.

== Amager Øst today ==
After urban renewal, particularly the area around Holmbladsgade is today recognized as an attractive and lively residential neighbourhood. An important step in the refurbishment of the area was the construction of the Holmbladsgade Sports and Culture Centre, designed by Dorthe Mandrup.

Amager Strandpark has, since its inauguration in 2005, become the primary beach destination for Copenhageners and a venue for a variety of sports and cultural activities. Another significant greenspace in the district is Kløvermarken.

== Attractions ==
- Amager Strandpark
- Holmbladsgade Sports and Culture Centre
- Amager Bio, music venue
