= Kløvermarken =

Park in Copenhagen

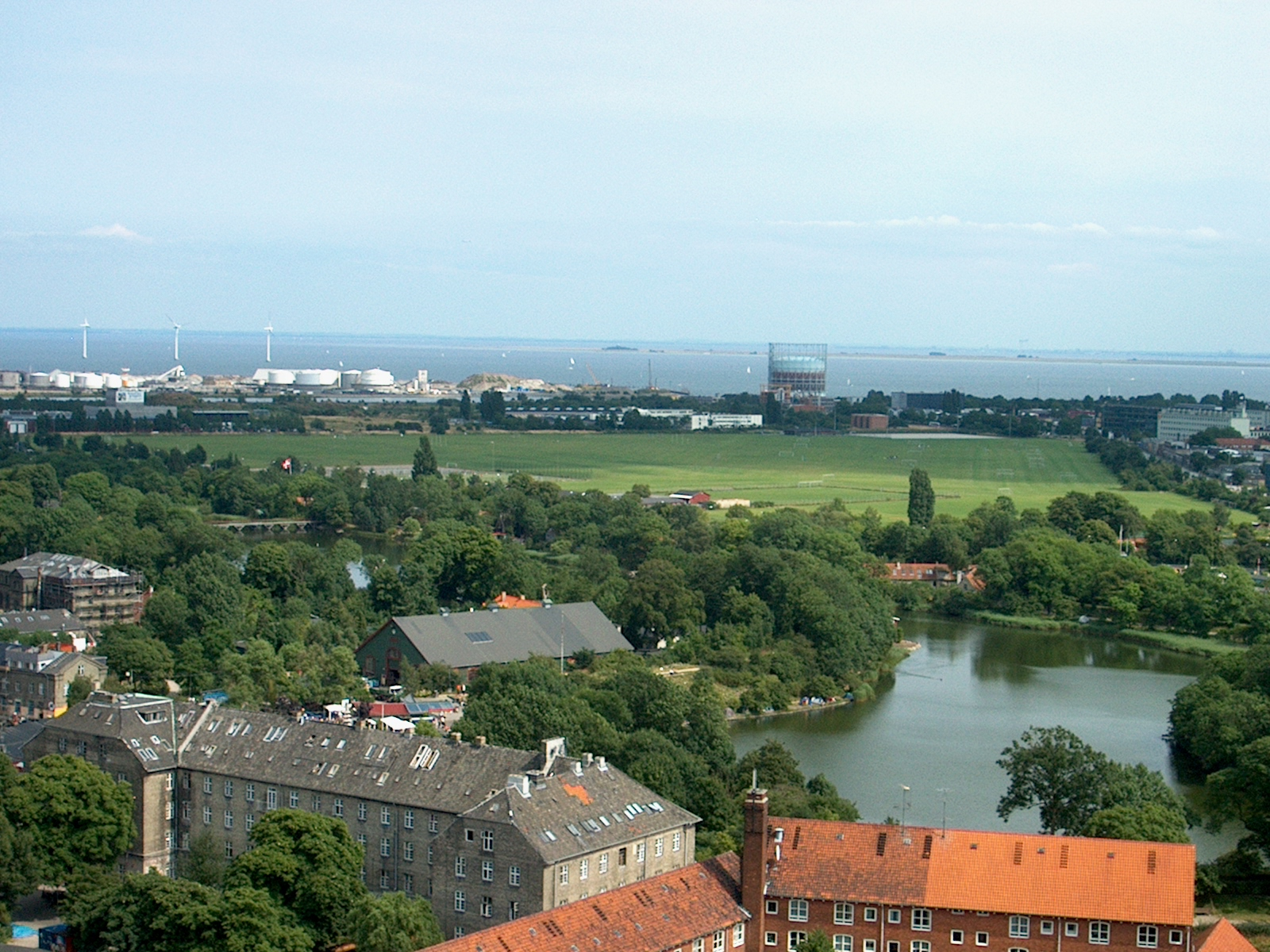

- Location within Denmark
- Type: Public
- Location: Amager East, Copenhagen
- Coordinates: 55°40′18″N 12°36′55″E
- Area: ? hectares
- Owner: Copenhagen Municipality

Kløvermarken (the Clover Field) is a large green space in the Amager East district of Copenhagen, Denmark. Originally a military area, it has later been home to both Copenhagen's first air field and a camp for German refugees after World War II. It now features football pitches and other sports facilities as well as a nature centre for children.

Kløvermarken is bounded by Uplandsgade, Raffinaderivej and Kløvermarksvej. The area between the park and Stadsgraven, the canal which separates Amager from Christianshavn, is dominated by allotments.

== History ==
=== Early history ===
Kløvermarken is the last undeveloped section of Christianshavns Fælled, which used to serve as a military training area. The name Kløvermarken is first seen in 1847. At that time the area reached all the way to the Øresund coast where the Stricker Battery had been constructed in 1801 as the most southernly point on Copenhagen's fortifications. It was expanded in 1875–76 but decommissioned in 1914 and removed in 1965 to make way for.

=== Aviation pioneering hub ===
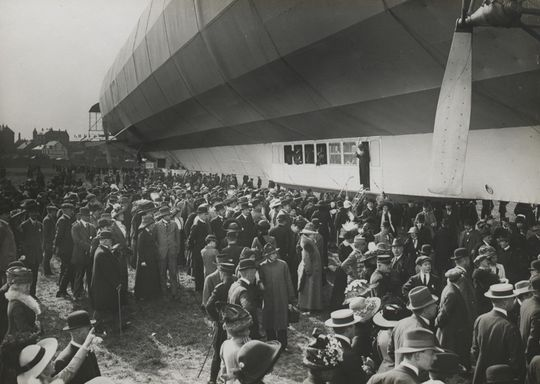
Hansa at Kløvermarken in September 1912

Kløvermarken has a central place in early Danish aviation history after it came into use as an air field in 1909. On 5 January 1910, Robert Svendsen set a Danish record when he reached a height of 84 during a flight at Kløvermarken. On 3 June 1910, Politiken-journalist Alfred Nervø made the first flight over downtown Copenhagen when he took off from Kløvermarken in a Voisin biplane, crossed the harbour and flew over Copenhagen Fortress and The Lakes before making a circuit of the City Hall tower and returning to Kløvermarken where he landed safely. Later that summer, on 17 July, Robert Svendsen made the first flight across the Øresund, from Kløvermarken to Limhamn near Malmö. On 18 September 1912, Count Zeppelin landed his Zeppelin airship Hansa on Kløvermarken, its first destination outside Germany.

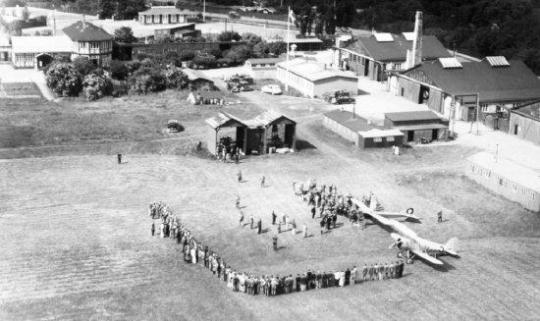
The Danish Army Air Corps' 25 years anniversary at Kløvermarken in 1937

The Royal Danish Army established the Danish Army Air Corps on 2 July 1912, setting up an aviation school at Kløvermarken. They built a complex of hangars and various other facilities at the site in 1917. Kløvermarken was also used by Danish Air Lines which was founded on 29 October 1918.

In 1925, the civilian flights moved to the new Copenhagen Airport a little further down the coast, at Kastrup, and a couple of years later they were joined by the military activities.

=== World War II refugee camp ===
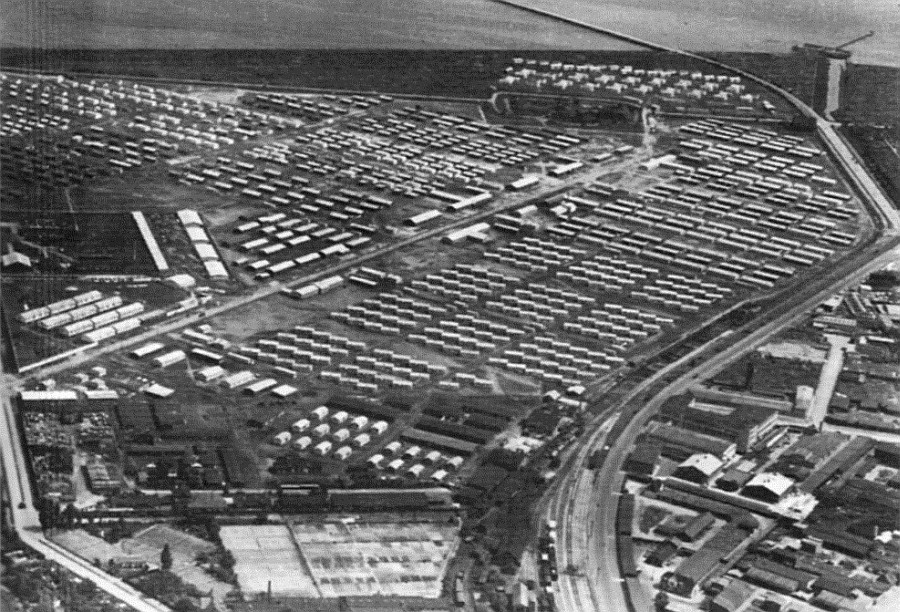
The refugee camp seen from the air

During the last months of World War II, large numbers of German refugees arrived in Denmark. They had been evacuated throughout the Operation Hannibal across the Baltic Sea after the Red Army started the East Prussian and East Pomeranian Offensives. Of the 240,000 German refugees who came to Denmark, 92,000 were placed in the Copenhagen area, distributed on 152 sites. After the liberation in May 1945, they were collected in large, guarded camps. A town of hutments was built at Kløvermarken where up to 19,000 refugees, mainly women and children were placed. Most of them had been sent back to Germany by August 1947 but a minor section of the camp lingered until it was finally shut on 14 February 1949. Some sources and recent research state that thousands of children at Kløvermarken died from hunger because of "a humanitarian catastrophe".

=== Recreational use ===
In the 1950s, amateur football clubs began to use Kløvermarken. Three wooden buildings from the 1930s which had been built as a quarantine Station for polio patients were converted into changing rooms in 1955. From that time on, Kløvermarken has primarily served as an area for amateur sports. The last historic buildings from 1917 were pulled down in 1984.

=== Redevelopment plans and consecration ===
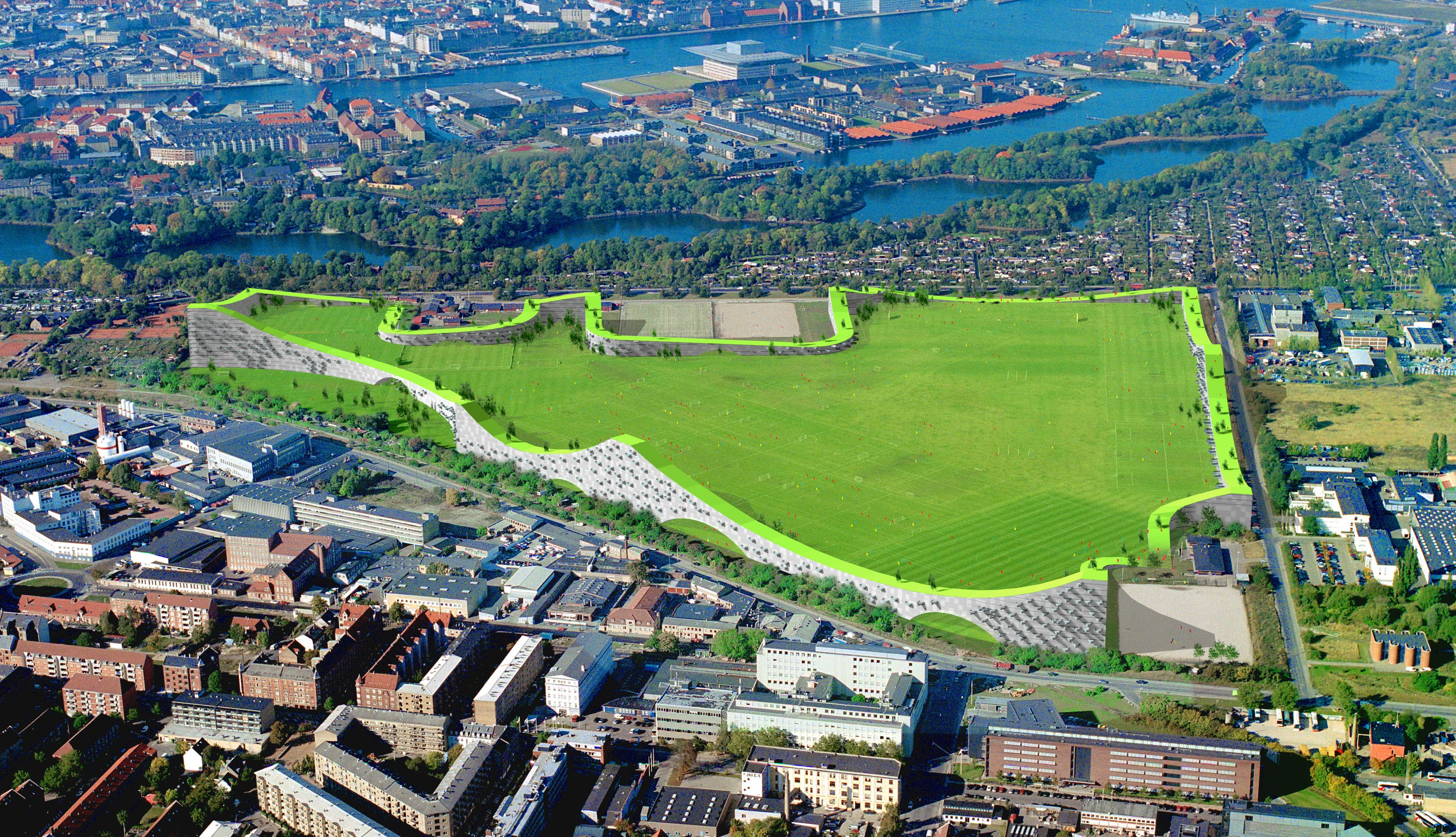
A rendering showing PLOT's proposal

In 2005, in response to Lord Mayor Ritt Bjerregaard's launching of an affordable homes campaign, the architectural firm Plot, founded by Bjarke Ingels and Julien De Smedt, proposed to build a giant 3 km perimeter block around the edge of Kløvermarken to deal with the problem of housing shortage without compromising its role as a recreational space. The block would bend and curve around existing club houses and other buildings while large arches would create connections to the surrounding areas, and the height of the building would vary in respect to neighbors and views to the historic skyline of the city, creating a Great Wall of roof gardens and terraces. The proposal which in this way wanted to add 3,000 apartments without sacrificing a single football field won initial support at the City Hall but was met with public protests and later given up. The area was preserved in May 2012.

== Kløvermarken today ==
Most of Kløvermarken is covered by lawns used for football and cricket pitches. There are also cricket, weight lifting and tennis facilities.

Kløvermarken is also home to Naturværkstedet Kløvermarken, a nature centre with recreational and educational activities and theme days for children. Time reservation is required.

== See also ==
- Hangar H
- Oksbøl Refugee Camp
