= Amagerbrogade =

Shopping street in Amager, Copenhagen, Denmark

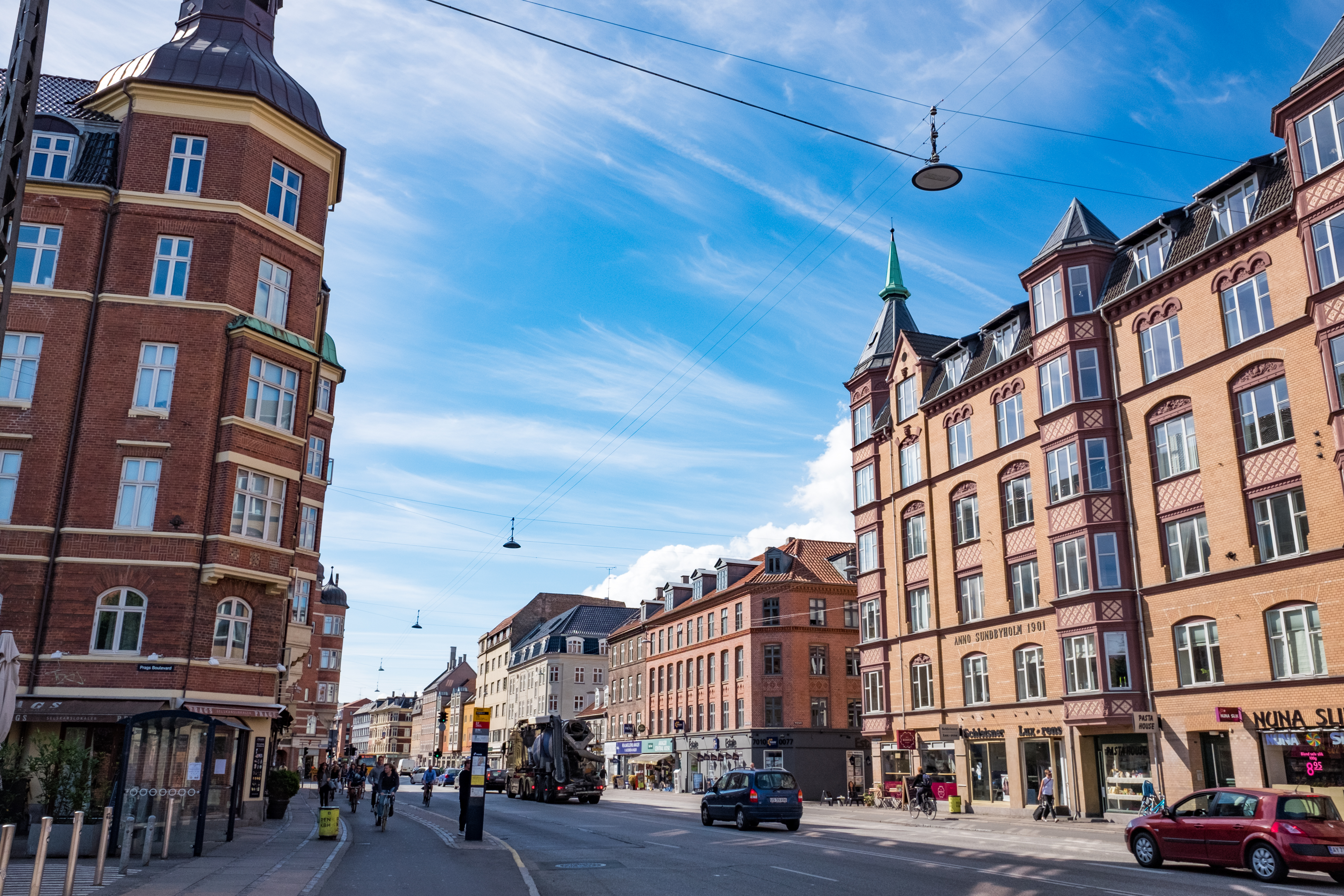
- Amagerbrogade
- Interactive map of Amagerbrogade
- Length: 3,500 m (11,500 ft)
- Location: Copenhagen, Denmark
- Quarter: Amager
- Postal code: 2300
- Nearest metro station: Amagerbro Station
- Coordinates: 55°39′2″N 36°36′44″E

Amagerbrogade is the main shopping street and thoroughfare of the part of Copenhagen, Denmark that is located on the island of Amager. It begins at the end of the causeway which connects Amager to Christianshavn and the city centre on the other side of the harbour, and runs south until it reaches the municipal border with Tårnby where it continues as Amager Landevej. The street marks the border between Amager Vest and Amager Øst, two of the ten official districts of Copenhagen.

Amagerbrogade arose when the country road leading in and out of Copenhagen's Amager Gate was urbanized towards the end of the 18th century after the city's old fortifications had been decommissioned and the no-built zone outside them released. It is one of four such -bro streets.

== History ==
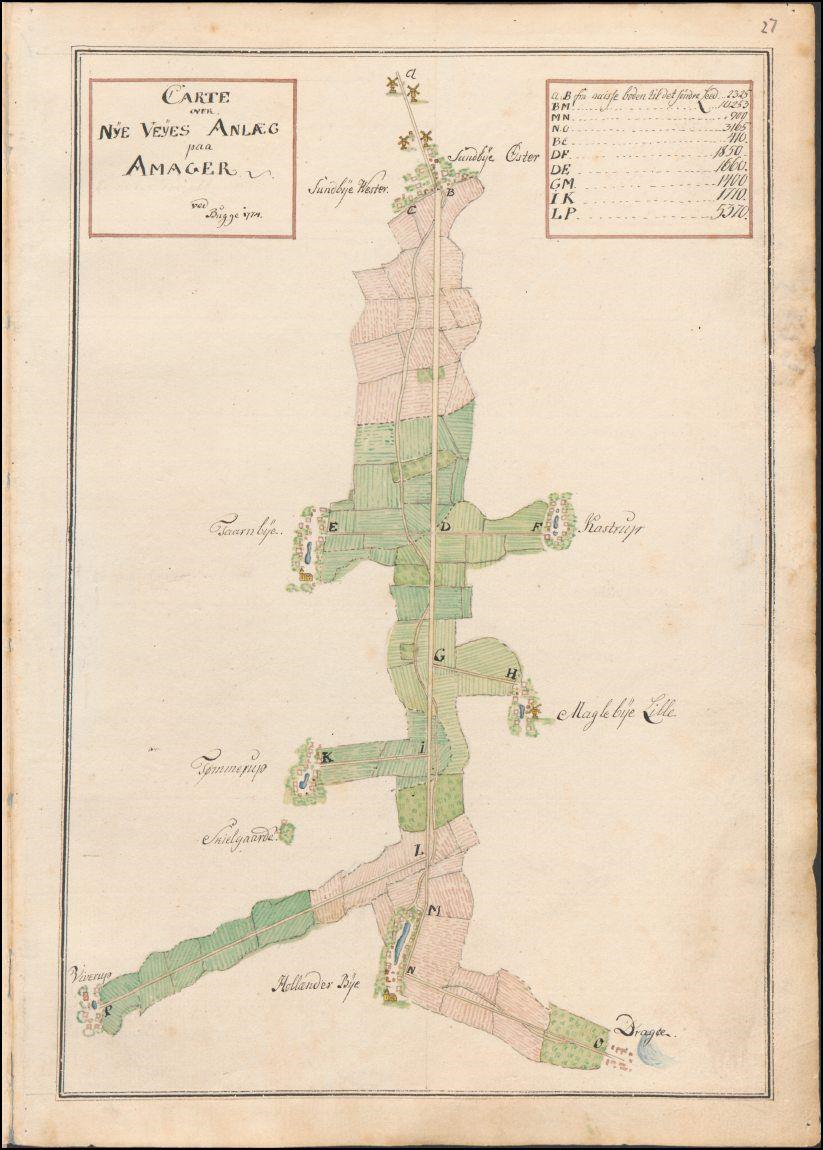
New roads on Amager, 1774

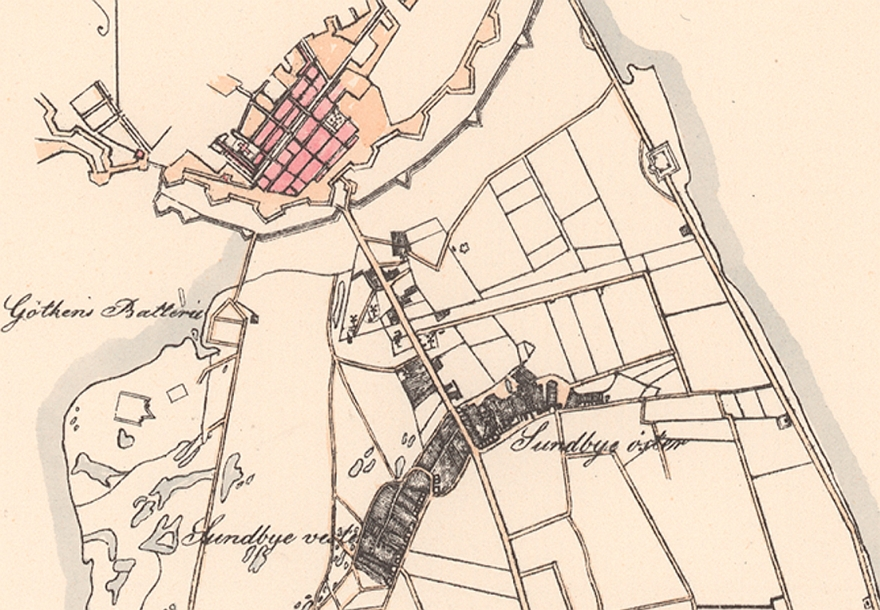
Amagerbrogade in the 19th century

Om the 18th century the road network outside Amager Gate was generally limited and in a poor state. From 1780 to 1790 the main road to Store Magleby and Dragør was upgraded but only a short stretch was cobbled. The first part of the road was 20 ells broad while the rest was only 14 alls broad. After Amager Gate was dismantled in 1857 and the fortifications were decommissioned, the northernmost part of Amager saw increasing development and in 1902 the area was incorporated into Copenhagen Municipality and the name was changed to Amagerbrogade.

== Cultural references ==
Amagerbrogade 4 is used as a location at 1:30:39 in the 1975 Olsen-banden film The Olsen Gang on the Track.
