= Amager =

Island in the Øresund

Coordinates: 55°37′N 12°37′E

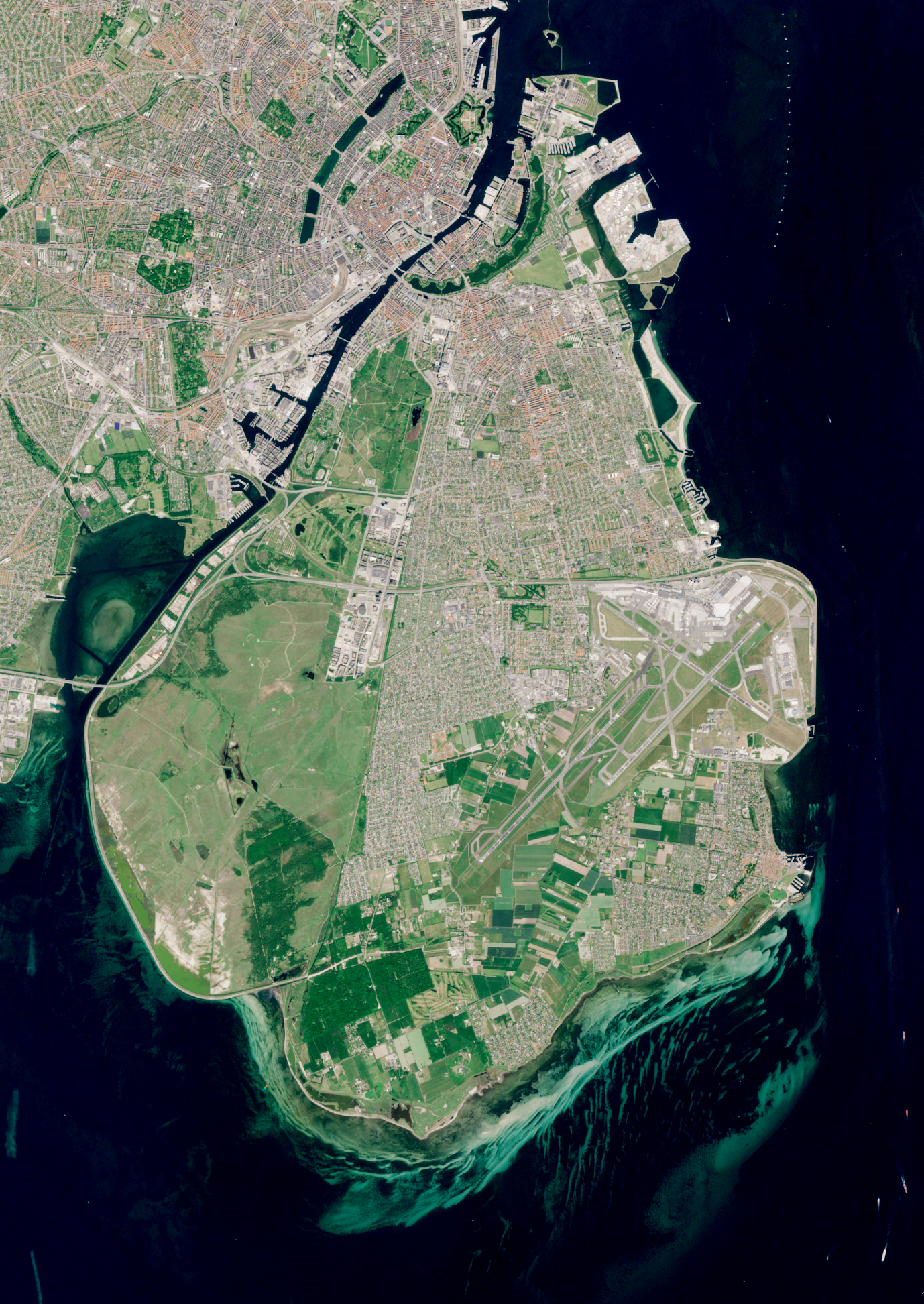
- Aerial view of Amager

Geography
- Location: Øresund
- Area: 96 km^{2} (37 sq mi)

Administration
- Denmark
- Municipalities: Copenhagen, Tårnby, Dragør

Demographics
- Population: 225,746 (1 January 2025)

Amager (Danish pronunciation: [ˈɑˌmɑˀ] or, especially among older speakers, [ˈɑˌmɛˀɐ]), located in the Øresund, is Denmark's most densely populated island, with 225,746 inhabitants (January 2025). Amager is the largest island in the Øresund, and the only one with a large population.

Amager is home to parts of Copenhagen including Freetown Christiania, as well as Copenhagen Airport. The island is connected to the much larger island of Zealand (Sjælland) by nine bridges and a metro tunnel, and to Sweden via the Øresund Bridge.

== Geography and administrative divisions ==
The northern part of the island is covered by parts of Copenhagen Municipality. South of the island's Copenhagen neighbourhoods lies Tårnby Municipality, parts of which also belong to the urban area of Copenhagen. More than half the island's population live in the urban areas belonging to Copenhagen and Tårnby. The southernmost part of the island, not part of Copenhagen's urban area, forms Dragør Municipality. Amager also has large nature areas, as well as some farmland.

Various communities are located on Amager, including the Copenhagen neighbourhoods of Christianshavn, Islands Brygge, Amager Øst, Amager Vest, and Ørestad. Outside Copenhagen proper lie Dragør, Kastrup, and Tårnby.

Whether or not Christianshavn (including Freetown Christiania) is part of Amager is subject to debate locally, partly due to the canal which separates them mostly, but not entirely from (the rest of) Amager. The Danish Agency for Climate Data, the Danish mapping authority, uses a definition of the island of Amager which includes Christianshavn.

== History ==
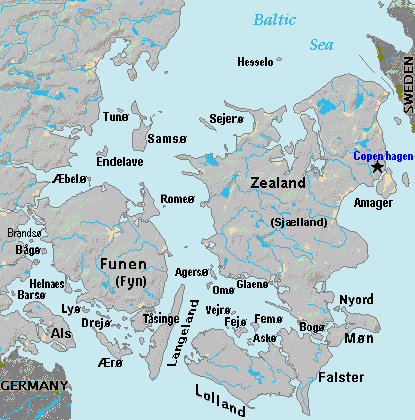
Amager island (right center) is east of Zealand island, south of central Copenhagen, west of Sweden.

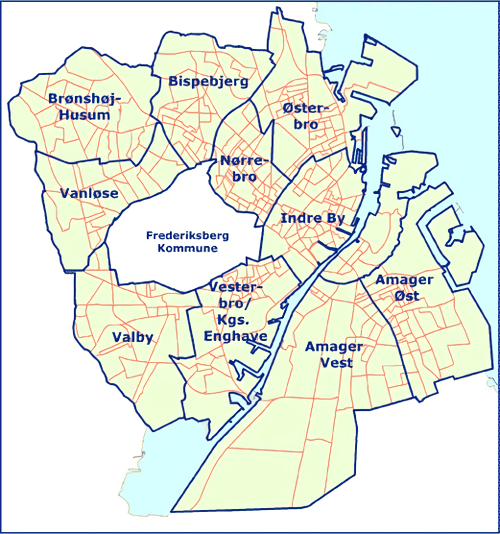
A part of Copenhagen Municipality covers northern Amager.

Amager has long been populated, and well used, thanks to its rich soil and proximity to Copenhagen. In 1521, Christian II invited some Dutch farmers to move to Amager and grow vegetables to supply the Danish Court and Copenhagen. They were skilled farmers, and Amager was previously referred to as the "pantry of Copenhagen".

The Dutch farmers enjoyed certain privileges such as their own government and institutions, as well as their own schools and priests. They also retained their traditional clothing (folkedragt), still used for folkloric dances etc. Due to this and a ban on mixed marriages, they maintained their own language, Amager Dutch, which remained spoken until 1858. This dialect's spelling and vocabulary was influenced by Danish, and it had heavier phonological and grammatical influence from Low German, due to the importance of Low German in trade in the Baltic Sea and the influence of Low German-speaking Lutheran clergy.

It was only in the late 19th century that Copenhagen began to expand onto the island (Sundbyerne), and in 1902 these built-up areas were incorporated into Copenhagen.

During the Second World War, in 1943, high unemployment in Copenhagen led authorities to drain a large part of the sea, west of the island, and build a dam to hold out the water, effectively adding 20 km^{2} - one half of Amager's previous area - to the island. The claimed area is currently known as Kalvebod Fælled, and was originally a military area, but today it is part of a newly constructed neighbourhood called the Ørestad, being thought of as an extension to central Copenhagen. This project was initiated by the Danish government.

The beach area to the east of the island, known as Amager Strandpark (Amager Beach Park), which had fallen into disrepair since its inception in the 1930s, was extensively redeveloped between May 2004 and August 2005. A 2-km-long artificial island was constructed just off the mainland, from which it is separated by a small lagoon.

Until the 1970s, Amager was used as a place to dump latrine waste; this led to a slang term for the island 'Lorteøen' (Shit Island). See Renholdningsselskabet af 1898. Today the waters off Amager are clean and feature popular and attractive beaches.

== Nature ==
At 35 km^{2}, the protected natural area of Naturpark Amager makes up more than one-third of the island's total area of 96 km^{2}. This area includes Kalvebod Fælled, which comprises land that was claimed from the sea in 1943. While the soil in this reclaimed land is unsuitable for agricultural use, the area between Dragør town and the airport is cultivated land of high quality.

Another part of Naturpark Amager is Amager Common (Danish: Amager Fælled), a 223-hectare nature reserve in north-west Amager. The former military area is home to a diverse range of flora and fauna; including forests, fields, and Highland cattle. At the southern border of Naturpark Amager lies the forest Kongelunden (The King's Grove), established in the early 19th century, with a predominance of oak. It is popular for biking, bird watching, and horseback riding.

== Notable buildings and facilities ==
The National Aquarium Denmark is situated in the east of Amager and is Northern Europe's largest aquarium. Also notable is Amager Bakke, a combined waste-to-energy plant with a dry ski slope and other recreational facilities on its roof.

Ørestad is host to Bella Center, a convention and exposition center, Field's, the second-largest shopping center in Scandinavia, and Royal Arena, a multi-use indoor arena.

== Sandagergård station ==
Sandagergård station at Amager is the main fixed technical interception and evaluation station of the Danish Military Intelligence Service (Forsvarets Efterretningstjeneste, FE). In Sandagergård are HF-DF-systems and a small version of a Wullenweber-Antenna arrays is in operation. The station has several large radomes for satellite interception.

The station participated in the historical Echelon-network of five eyes and was connected to the Allied Command Baltic Approaches, the regional NATO-command for the Baltic region at Karup airbase.

== Transport ==
Copenhagen Airport is in the eastern part of Amager, in Tårnby Municipality, about 8 kilometres (5 miles) from Copenhagen city centre.

Amager is connected by tunnel to the artificial island Peberholm from which Øresund Bridge connects Denmark to Sweden. The construction of the bridge has had a significant impact on the physical geography of the island, largely due to the construction of new highways.

The Copenhagen Metro connects Amager to central Copenhagen. The metro line from Vanløse to Amager divides into M1 and M2 lines at Christianshavn and then continues to Vestamager and Lufthavnen (Copenhagen Airport). Regional and long-distance train services, including to Sweden, serve Copenhagen Airport as well as Tårnby and Ørestad stations.

=== Bridges to Zealand ===
Nine bridges currently link Amager and Zealand, listed here in order from north to south.

- Inderhavnsbroen (pedestrian/bicycle only)
- Knippelsbro
- Lille Langebro (pedestrian/bicycle only)
- Langebro
- Bryggebroen (pedestrian/bicycle only)
- Unnamed bridge between Ved Stigbordene and Ved Slusen (pedestrian/bicycle only)
- Sjællandsbroen
- A railway and pedestrian/bicycle bridge sometimes referred to as Amagerbroen, part of the Øresund railway
- Kalvebodbroerne

A tenth bridge to the north of Inderhavnsbroen is planned, proposed to link Østerbro on the Zealand side with Refshaleøen on the Amager side.

== Danish expressions with 'Amager' ==
Several Danish expressions reference the island:

- Amar! – an incantation for innocence, a mild oath (honest Injun! cross my heart!)
- Amagergarn – mercerised cotton embroidery thread, pearl yarn, perle cotton, coton perlé (in German: de:Perlgarn)
- Amagerbroderi (Amager embroidery) is colourful flat sewing known from Amager
- Amagersyning (Amager stitching) is Dutch-inspired embroidery techniques
- Amagerhylde – Amager shelf, an A-shaped triangular shelf for trinkets
- Amagermad – Amager sandwich, consisting of one slice of brown and one of white bread with butter between them, and possibly cold cuts
- Amager-nummerplade (vehicle registration plate of Amager) is a lower-back tattoo.
- Amagerkys – to give an Amager kiss means to headbutt someone.

== Notable people ==
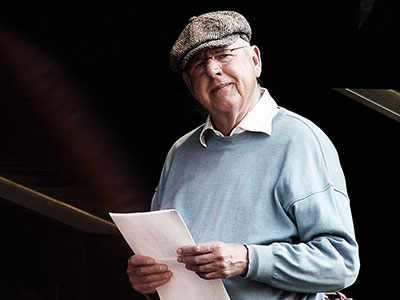
Klaus Rifbjerg, 2009

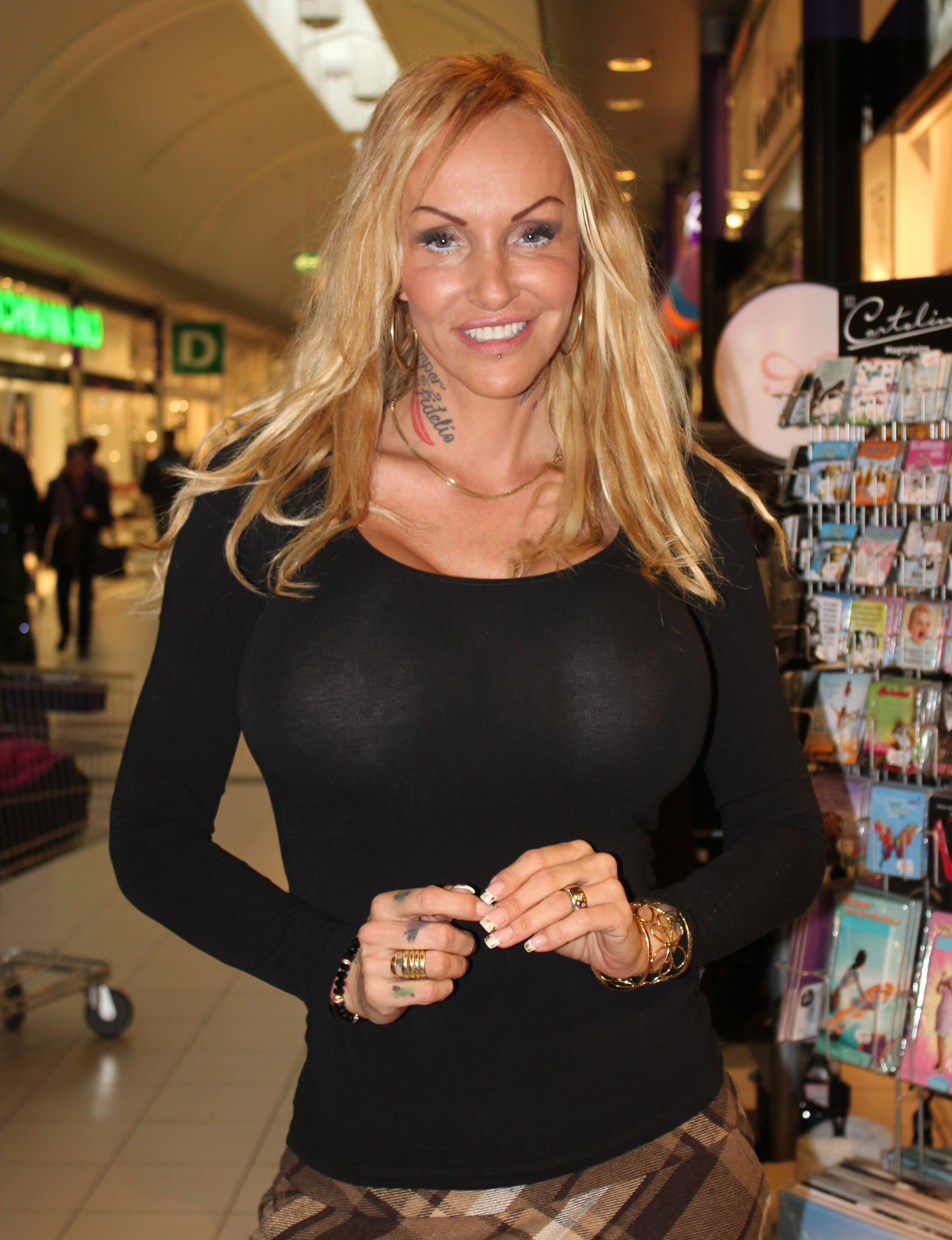
Linse Kessler, 2013

- Dannie Druehyld (1947–2021), Danish witch, environmentalist, and activist
- Christiane Koren (1764–1815), Danish-Norwegian writer
- Johan C.Schwarz-Nielsen (1924–1987), Lutheran vicar
- Klaus Rifbjerg (1931–2015), Danish writer
- Ole Rasmussen (born 1952), Danish former football player
- Frank Arnesen (born 1956), Danish former footballer
- Morten Stig Christensen (born 1958), Danish former handball player
- Brian Holm (born 1962), retired Danish professional rider in road bicycle racing
- Peter Frödin (born 1964), Danish actor, comedian and singer
- Linse Kessler (born 1966), Danish television personality, actress and businesswoman
- Jacob Moe Rasmussen (born 1975), Danish former cyclist
- Mikkel Kessler (born 1979), Danish former professional boxer
- Christine Milton (born 1985), Danish pop singer, songwriter and professional dancer
- Martin Bernburg (born 1985), Danish professional footballer
- Joey Moe (born 1985), Danish-Hawaiian hip hop pop singer and producer
- Nicklas Bendtner (born 1988), Danish professional footballer
- Christopher (born 1992), also known as Christopher Nissen, is a Danish singer
- Cisilia (born 1998), also known as Cisilia Ismailova, is a Danish singer
- Dar Salim (born 1977), an Iraqi-born Danish actor. He fled to Denmark as a six-year-old refugee from Iraq and lived on the island of Amager

== See also ==
- List of islands of Denmark
