= Sundbyøster =

Coordinates: 55°39′40″N 12°36′40″E

The districts of Copenhagen municipality: A: Indre By ("Copenhagen Center") B: Christianshavn C: Indre Østerbro ("Inner Østerbro") D: Ydre Østerbro ("Outer Østerbro") E: Indre Nørrebro ("Inner Nørrebro") F: Ydre Nørrebro ("Outer Nørrebro") G: Bispebjerg H: Vanløse I: Brønshøj-Husum J: Vesterbro K: Kongens Enghave L: Valby M: Vestamager N: Sundbyvester O: Sundbyøster

Sundbyøster (Danish pronunciation: [sɔnpyˈøstɐ]) is one of the 15 administrative, statistical, and tax city districts (bydele) comprising the municipality of Copenhagen, Denmark. It lies on the southeast border of the municipality on the island of Amager. It covers an area of 8.60 km^{2}, has a population of 48,673 and a population density of 5,658 per km^{2}, which makes it the most populated district in Copenhagen.

Neighboring city districts are as follows:

- to the northwest is Christianshavn, separated from Syndbyøster by Stadsgraven (the city moat)
- to the west is Sundbyvester
- to the south is Tårnby municipality, which is outside the Copenhagen municipality area
- to the east is the Øresund, the strait which separates the island of Zealand from Sweden
