= Sundbyvester =

Coordinates: 55°39′30″N 12°36′10″E

The districts of Copenhagen municipality: A: Indre By ("Copenhagen Center") B: Christianshavn C: Indre Østerbro ("Inner Østerbro") D: Ydre Østerbro ("Outer Østerbro") E: Indre Nørrebro ("Inner Nørrebro") F: Ydre Nørrebro ("Outer Nørrebro") G: Bispebjerg H: Vanløse I: Brønshøj-Husum J: Vesterbro K: Kongens Enghave L: Valby M: Vestamager N: Sundbyvester O: Sundbyøster

Sundbyvester (Danish pronunciation: [sɔnpyˈvestɐ]) is one of the 15 administrative, statistical, and tax city districts (bydele) comprising the municipality of Copenhagen, Denmark. It lies on the south border of the municipality on the island of Amager. It covers an area of 5.21 km^{2}, has a population of 38,017 and a population density of 7,302 per km^{2}.

Neighboring city districts are as follows:

- to the northeast is Sundbyøster
- to the north is Christianshavn, separated from Syndbyvester by Stadsgraven (the city moat)
- to the west is Vestamager
- to the south is Tårnby municipality, which is outside of the Copenhagen municipality area
