= Vesterbro, Copenhagen =

District of Copenhagen, Denmark

Coordinates: 55°40′02″N 12°33′18″E

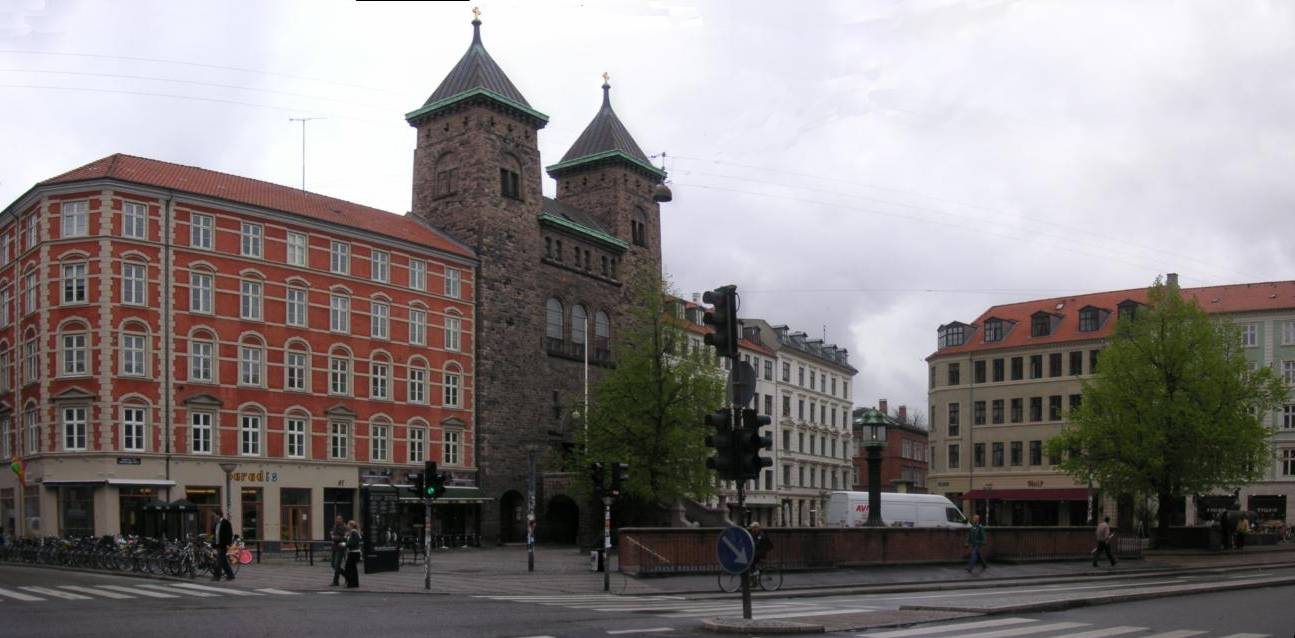
Vesterbro Square (Vesterbros Torv) is a triangular plaza at Vesterbrogade (“Vesterbro Street) and Gasværksvej in the Vesterbro district of Copenhagen, Denmark.

Vesterbro is one of the 15 administrative, statistical, and city tax districts (bydele) comprising the municipality of Copenhagen, Denmark. It covers an area of 8.37 km^{2} (3.23 sq mi), has a population of 85,061 and a population density of 10,163 per km^{2}.

The districts of Copenhagen municipality: A: Indre By ("Copenhagen Center") B: Christianshavn C: Indre Østerbro ("Inner Østerbro") D: Ydre Østerbro ("Outer Østerbro") E: Indre Nørrebro ("Inner Nørrebro") F: Ydre Nørrebro ("Outer Nørrebro") G: Bispebjerg H: Vanløse I: Brønshøj-Husum J: Vesterbro K: Kongens Enghave L: Valby M: Vestamager N: Sundbyvester O: Sundbyøster

Neighboring city districts are:

- to the northeast, the Indre By, also known as "Copenhagen Center", "Downtown Copenhagen" or "City".
- to the north, Frederiksberg municipality, which is not a part of Copenhagen municipality but rather an enclave surrounded by the municipality.
- to the west, Valby.
- to the south, Kongens Enghave.

== The Vesterbro district ==
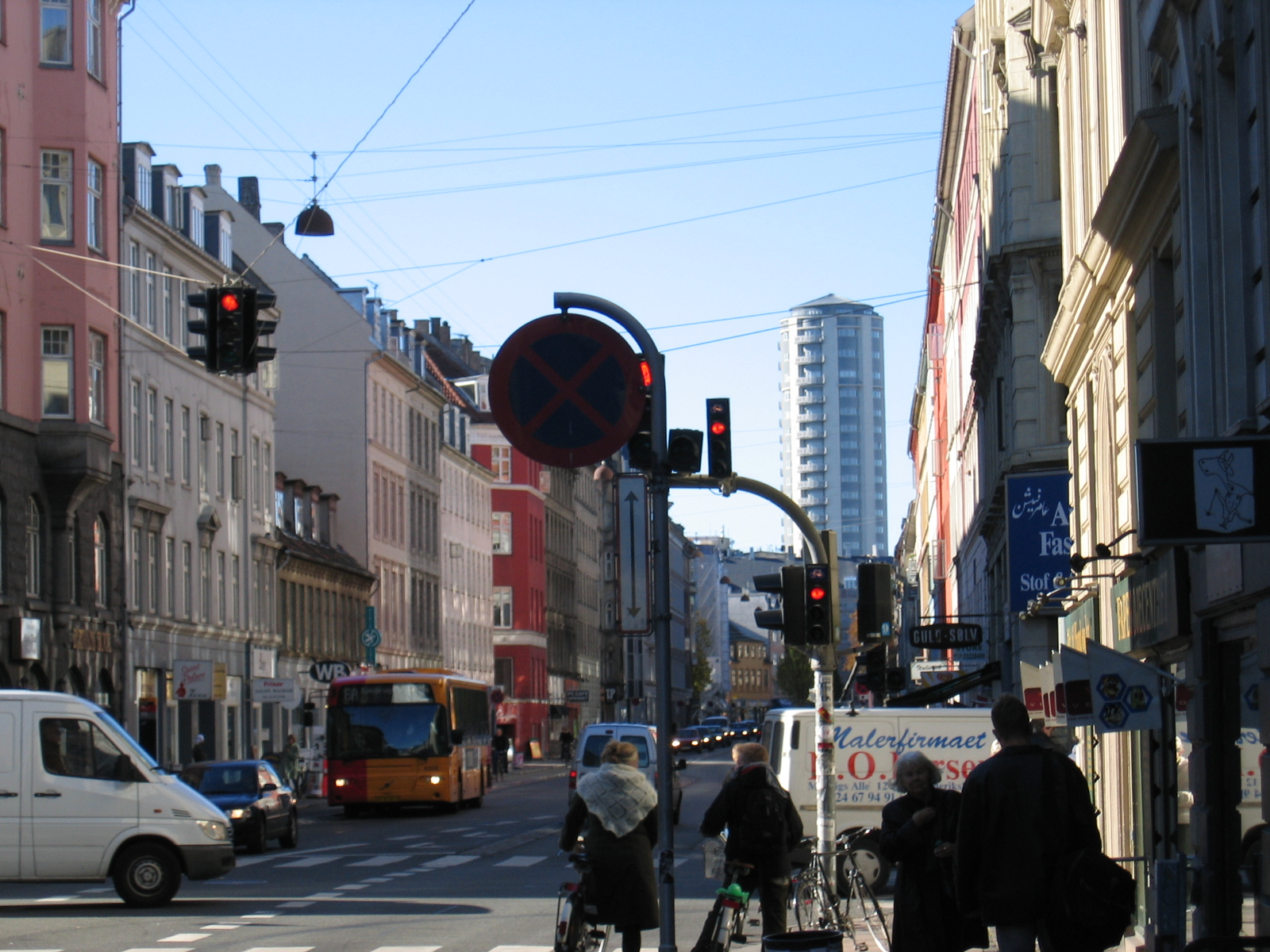
Built in 1957, Kongens Bryghus served as a silo for Carlsberg until 1970. In 1997, the silo was converted into residential apartments. Over the years Kongens Bryghus has become synonymous with Vesterbro.

Vesterbro is located just outside Copenhagen’s city center—the Inner City or Indre By—making it a very attractive place to live, as are the other areas immediately outside the center: the Indre Nørrebro ("Inner Nørrebro"), Indre Østerbro ("Inner Østerbro"), Frederiksberg, and Christianshavn.

The district is located west of the city center at the location of the old Western Gate ("Vesterport"), access way into the old city. The gate, along with the other three gates into the old city—Østerport ("Eastern Gate") near the current Østerport station), Nørreport ("Northern Gate") near the current Nørreport station, and Amagerport ("Amager Gate", i.e. functionally the Southern Gate) between Christianshavn and the island of Amager—were dismantled in 1856.

The name "Vesterbro" literally translates into English as "Western Bridge", and refers to the paved (Danish, brolagt) road leading into the city through the Western Gate. Vesterbro is the area of the bridge into the city of Copenhagen, which was a much smaller city at the time when the name was created. At that time, the city was ringed by a moat which exist today as the small lakes found in Tivoli, Ørsted Park, Copenhagen Botanical Garden, and Østre Anlæg Park.

The area has been under renovation to a great extent which ended in 2017. The environment and sustainability is one of the essential reasons for the renovation.

== History ==
Before 1852, it was generally prohibited to build in the immediate area outside of the fortification surrounding the area now known as the Inner City of Copenhagen unless given special permission. Much of the area was used as grazing land, and by the 1780s there were approximately 1,000 inhabitants of the area, as well as a number of commercial enterprises (lumberyards, tobacco farm, several industrial buildings). Furthermore, the Royal Copenhagen Shooting Society and Danish Brotherhood ("Det kongelige kjøbenhavnske Skydeselskab og danske Broderskab") received aforementioned special permission to build outside the fortification in the 1750s. The building is located on Vesterbrogade, one of the main streets of the Vesterbro area, and housed the Museum of Copenhagen from 1956 to 2015. It currently houses Musikhuset København, an acoustical music performance venue and culture.

With the abolishment of the demarcation line in 1853, the dismantling of the old fortifications that ringed the center of town in the late 1860s, and the removal of the old entrance gates to the city in 1856, the population quickly spread out to the undeveloped areas outside the center. This movement came first to the inner ring of areas outside the center: the Indre Østerbro ("Inner Østerbro"), the Indre Nørrebro ("Inner Nørrebro"), Vesterbro, and Frederiksberg. In 1860, the population of Vesterbro was 7,260 and in 1880 it had grown to 24,790.

At that time the name Vesterbro began being used for the entire area around the street named Vesterbro, and late in the 1800s the name of the street itself was changed to Vesterbrogade ("Vesterbro Street").

== Arts and Culture ==
=== The Meatpacking District ===
The Meatpacking District is a former industrial area in Vesterbro. In 1577, it was made illegal to slaughter animals within the fortification that surrounded Copenhagen up until the 1850s. To accommodate this, a public slaughterhouse was built on Vesterbrogade. In 1879, it was decided to move the livestock trade, and slaughter and butcher practices to Halmtorvet, where the municipality of Copenhagen built three slaughterhouses in 1883. From 1888, it was no longer allowed to slaughter animals in Copenhagen outside of the assigned area that would come to be known as Kødbyen, or the Meatpacking District in English, in the 1930s. During this time, the area was expanded with additional buildings that could live up to the hygiene rules imposed on the practices. The Meatpacking District continued its practices of slaughter until the 1970s, and produced meat product until the 1990s. Today, only a few food manufacturers are located in the area. The remaining buildings are listed and are home to a diverse selection of restaurants, bars, nightclubs, specialty supermarkets, galleries, and educational institutes. The Meatpacking District and its immediate surrounding area are also known for being home to prostitution and a large drug scene, as well as H17, the largest drug consumption house in the world.

=== Theaters ===
Det Ny Teater, built in 1908, is the only privately owned and one of the largest theaters in Denmark. Sort/Hvid opened in 1972 in Inner Copenhagen but moved their venue to the Meatpacking District in 2017 following a fire in their original location in 2014. Teatret ved Sorte Hest (English: The Theater at Black Horse) was founded in 1978 and was known as a "progressive theater" in the 1980s and 90s. It is located in the "Black Horse" area of Vesterbro, named after one of four inns that served as refuge for people who could not make it inside the gates of Inner Copenhagen before sundown in the 16th and 17th centuries. Husets Teater opened in 1975 in Inner Copenhagen and moved to one of the houses of the old entrance of the Meatpacking District in 1995.

=== Museums ===
Ny Carlsberg Glyptotek, commonly referred to as Glyptoteket, was founded by Carl Jacobsen, who donated his private collection of art to the public and commenced the building of Glyptoteket in 1888. Glyptoteket has a large permanent collection that includes Roman and Greek sculptures, an Egyptian collection, and French and Danish art. The building was opened to the public in 1897. Carl Jacobsen was the son of J.C. Jacobsen, the founder of Carlsberg, and he himself founded Ny Carlsberg, which was merged with Carlsberg in 1906. Glyptoteket is still a part of the Carlsberg Family today. The Museum of Copenhagen was founded in 1901 and is currently located at Stormgade 20 in the building that was previously used by Overformynderiet (English: The Public Trustee's Office) until 1938. The museum opened in this location, Stormgade, in 2020, and was previously located on Vesterbrogade. The permanent exhibition showcases the history of Copenhagen through artifacts from the Viking Age to the present day. Planetarium, formerly known as the Tycho Brahe Planetarium, is a science center located by the lakes of Copenhagen. It was founded by Helge and Bodil Pedersen, opened in 1989, and has exhibitions, educational courses, and screenings of movies in the planetarium dome.

== Notable people ==
- Adam Oehlenschläger (1779 in Vesterbro – 1850), poet and playwright.
- Tove Ditlevsen (1917 in Vesterbro – 1976), a Danish poet and author with published works in a variety of genres.

== Attractions ==
- Istedgade (heart and soul of Vesterbro nightlife)
- Carlsberg neighbourhood
- Copenhagen Puppet Festival
- Tivoli Gardens
- Radisson SAS Royal Hotel, Copenhagen

== Parks ==
- Enghaveparken
- Skydebanehaven
