= Copenhagen Municipality =

Copenhagen Municipality Københavns Kommune (Danish)
- Municipality
- Municipality of Copenhagen
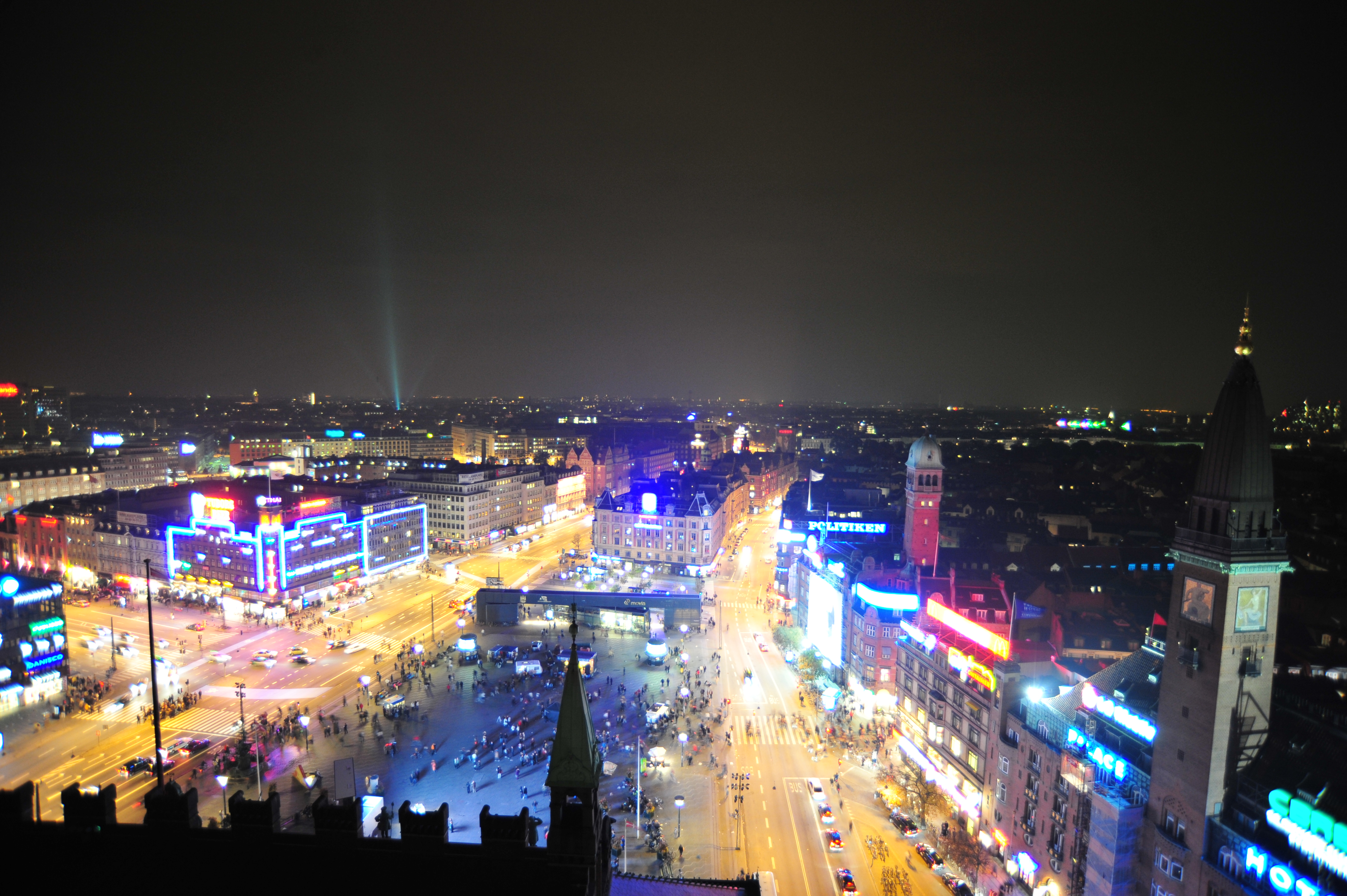
- Copenhagen Skyline

- Flag Seal Coat of arms

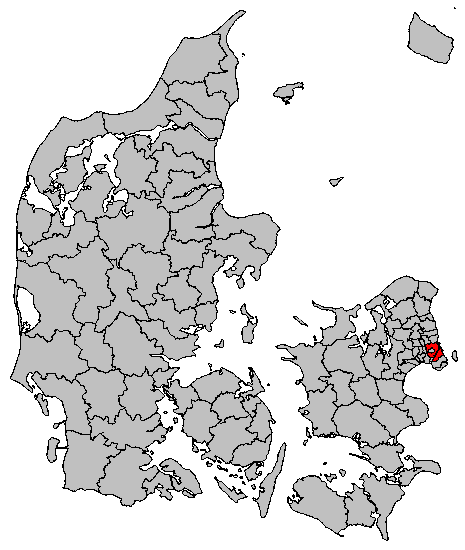
- Coordinates: 55°40′31″N 12°34′13″E
- Country: Denmark
- Region: Hovedstaden
- Seat: Copenhagen
- Districts: Districts: Indre By; Christianshavn; Indre Østerbro; Ydre Østerbro; Indre Nørrebro; Ydre Nørrebro; Bispebjerg; Vanløse; Brønshøj-Husum; Kongens Enghave; Valby; Vestamager; Sundbyvester; Sundbyøster

Government
  - Type: City council
  - Body: Copenhagen City Council
  - Lord Mayor: Sisse Marie Welling (Green Left)

Area
  - Total: 90.9 km^{2} (35.1 sq mi)

Population (1 March 2026)
  - Total: 673,575
  - Estimate (October 2016): 601,448
  - Density: 7,410/km^{2} (19,200/sq mi)
- Time zone: UTC+1 (CET)
  - Summer (DST): UTC+2 (CEST)
- Postal code: 1000-2500
- Municipal code: 101
- Website: www.kk.dk

Copenhagen Municipality (Danish: Københavns Kommune), also known in English as the Municipality of Copenhagen, located in the Capital Region of Denmark, is the largest of the four municipalities that constitute the City of Copenhagen (Byen København), the other three being Dragør, Frederiksberg, and Tårnby. The Municipality of Copenhagen constitutes the historic city center and the majority of its landmarks. It is the most populous in the country with a population of 673,575 inhabitants (as of March 2026), and covers 90.9 km^{2} (35.1 sq mi). Copenhagen Municipality is located on the islands of Zealand and Amager, and totally surrounds Frederiksberg Municipality on all sides. The strait of Øresund lies to the east. The city of Copenhagen has grown far beyond the municipal boundaries from 1901, when Frederiksberg Municipality was made an enclave within Copenhagen Municipality. Frederiksberg has the highest population density of the municipalities of Denmark.

The municipal seat of government is the Copenhagen City Hall (Danish: Københavns Rådhus), the headquarters of the Copenhagen City Council. The Lord Mayor of Copenhagen is Sisse Marie Welling, since 1 January 2026. The relationship between Copenhagen Municipality and the wider city of Copenhagen is one of an administrative unit within a significantly larger city, like the City of London or the City of Brussels.

In the Middle Ages, Copenhagen was defined as the area enclosed within the city walls. The city center lies in the area originally defined by the old ramparts, which are still referred to as the Fortification Ring (Fæstningsringen) and kept as a partial green band around it. In 1856 the ramparts were pulled down allowing for growth and expansion. In 1901 the city expanded to include Amager and Valby, while Frederiksberg became an enclave within the municipality. The Finger Plan in the second half of the 20th century led to expansion outside the municipal boundary along the commuter lines of the S-train and the Lokaltog rail lines going to i.e. Helsingør (The Coast Line (Kystbanen) northbound) and Stevns Municipality (East Line (from Køge southbound) along the Øresund. The Copenhagen-Ringsted Line makes Køge one of the railway hubs of Eastern Denmark. Road and rail construction is planned to relieve traffic congestion because the narrow 14.5–15.3-kilometre (9–9.5 mi) isthmus between Roskilde Fjord and Køge Bugt (Køge Bay) forms a bottleneck.

Copenhagen Municipality was one of the three last Danish municipalities not belonging to a county, the others being Frederiksberg Municipality and (from 2003) Bornholm. On 1 January 2007, the municipality lost its county privileges and became part of the Capital Region of Denmark.

== Geography ==
Copenhagen Municipality is a political division covering the central city (Indre By) and certain additional areas. It encloses Frederiksberg Municipality and stretches east to the waterfront. Neighboring municipalities are Gentofte, Gladsaxe and Herlev to the north, Rødovre and Hvidovre to the west, and Tårnby to the south.

The City Hall Square (Danish: Rådhuspladsen) is the old city center, from which an old shopping street leads northeast to Kongens Nytorv, which was laid out in the seventeenth century. Christiansborg Palace, which houses the Danish parliament, is located on the islet of Slotsholmen.

Nørrebro

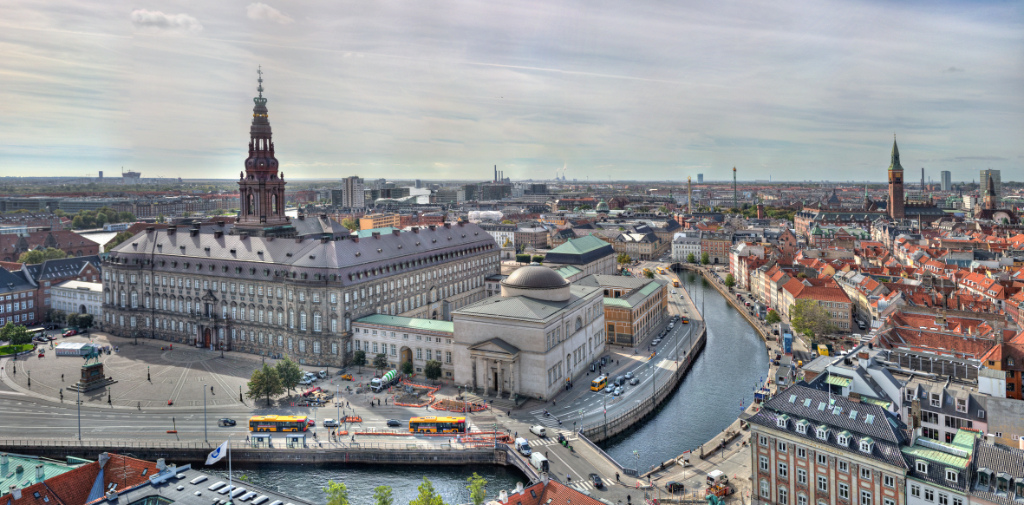
Slotsholmen

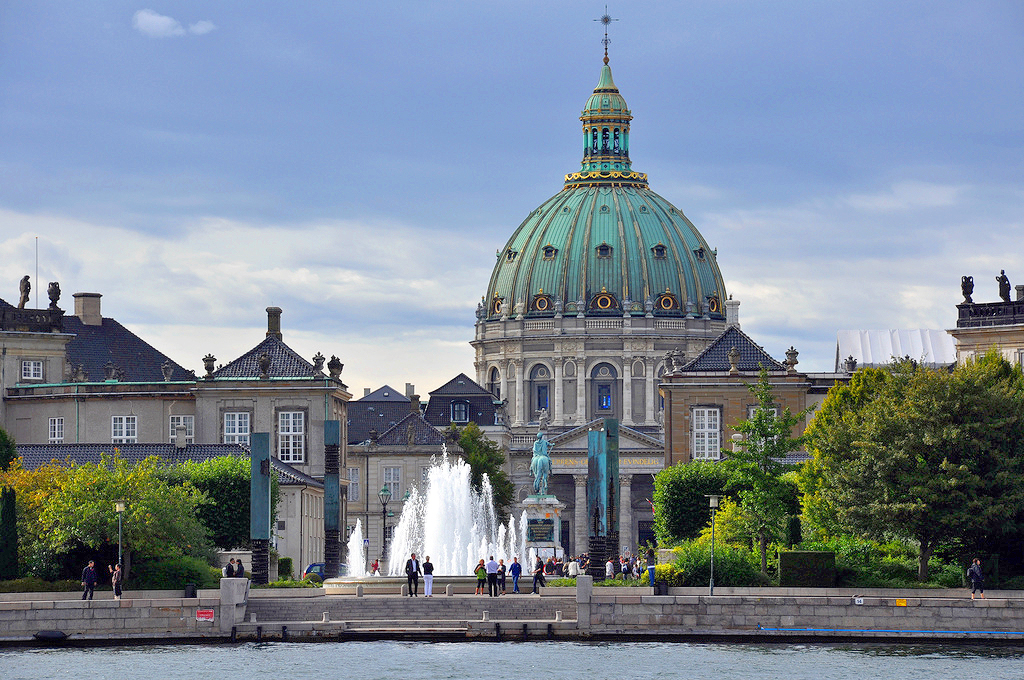
Amalienborg and Frederik's Church

=== Districts ===
The municipality is divided into ten administrative, statistical and tax districts (Danish: bydele):

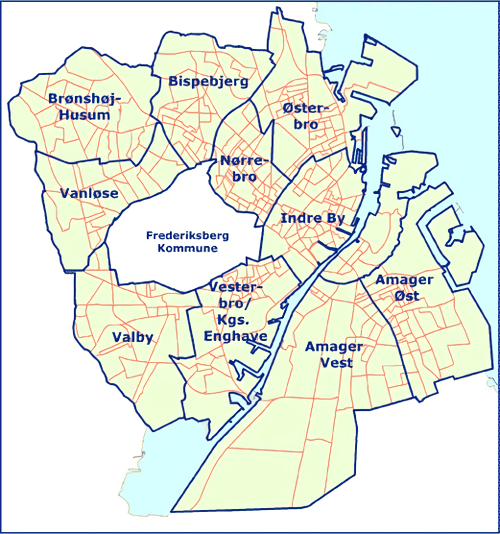
Districts of Copenhagen municipality

Official districts:

1. Indre By
2. Østerbro
3. Nørrebro
4. Vesterbro/Kongens Enghave
5. Valby
6. Vanløse
7. Brønshøj-Husum
8. Bispebjerg
9. Amager Øst
10. Amager Vest

Other areas:

- Slotsholmen
- Frederiksstaden
- Islands Brygge
- Holmen
- Christiania (Freetown)
- Carlsberg
- Sluseholmen
- Amagerbro
- Ørestad
- Nordhavnen
- Bellahøj
- Brønshøj
- Ryparken
- Vigerslev

The suffix -bro in the names Østerbro, Nørrebro, Vesterbro and Amagerbro should not be confused with the Danish word for bridge, which is also bro. The term is thought to be an abbreviation or short form of the Danish word brolagt meaning "paved", referring to the roads paved with cobblestones leading to the city's former gates.

== Demography ==
In the table below, the two figures for 1 February 1901 are before and after the municipality annexed some nearby parishes. The apparent decline since the 1960s are due to the figures not including the suburban and urban areas – notably Frederiksberg – outside Copenhagen municipality. With the exception of 2005, which saw a decrease of more than 1,000 people, the population of the municipality has been increasing since 1992 after having decreased by 303,539 inhabitants (39.517%) from 1950 to 1992. Copenhagen County rose from 313,601 (7 November 1950) to 618,529 in 2006, adding 304,928 inhabitants. Roskilde County rose from 76,781 to 241,523 inhabitants (2006), and Frederiksborg County from 147,695 to 378,686 inhabitants (2006). Frederiksberg Municipality went from 118,993 inhabitants to around 85,000 in 1988, and 104,664 in 2023. Counties were abolished from 1 January 2007.

Date	Year	Population
	1450	est. 4–5,000
	1500	est. 10,000
	1650	est. 30,000
	1700	est. 65,000
15 January	1769	80,000
1 July	1787	90,032
1 February	1801	100,975
1 February	1840	120,819
1 February	1850	129,695
1 February	1860	155,143
1 February	1870	181,291
1 February	1880	234,850
1 February	1890	312,859
1 February	1901	360,787
1 February	1901	400,575
1 February	1911	462,161
1 February	1921	561,344
5 November	1930	617,069
5 November	1940	700,465
7 November	1950	768,105
26 September	1960	721,381
9 November	1970	622,773

Year	Population
1971	625,671
1972	610,985
1973	595,751
1974	576,030
1975	562,405
1976	545,350
1977	529,154
1978	515,594
1979	505,974
1980	498,850
1981	493,771
1982	490,597
1983	486,593
1984	482,937
1985	478,615
1986	473,000
1987	469,706
1988	468,704
1989	467,850
1990	466,723
1991	464,773
1992	464,566

Year	Population
1993	466,129
1994	467,253
1995	471,300
1996	476,751
1997	483,658
1998	487,969
1999	491,082
2000	495,699
2001	499,148
2002	500,531
2003	501,285
2004	501,664
2005	502,362
2006	501,158
2007	503,699
2008	509,861
2009	518,574
2010	528,208
2011	539,542
2012	549,050
2013	559,440
2014	569,557

Note. The two population numbers given for 1901 are the municipality's population before annexation and following annexation of neighboring municipalities, which in the process made Frederiksberg municipality an enclave within the municipality of Copenhagen.

== Politics and government ==
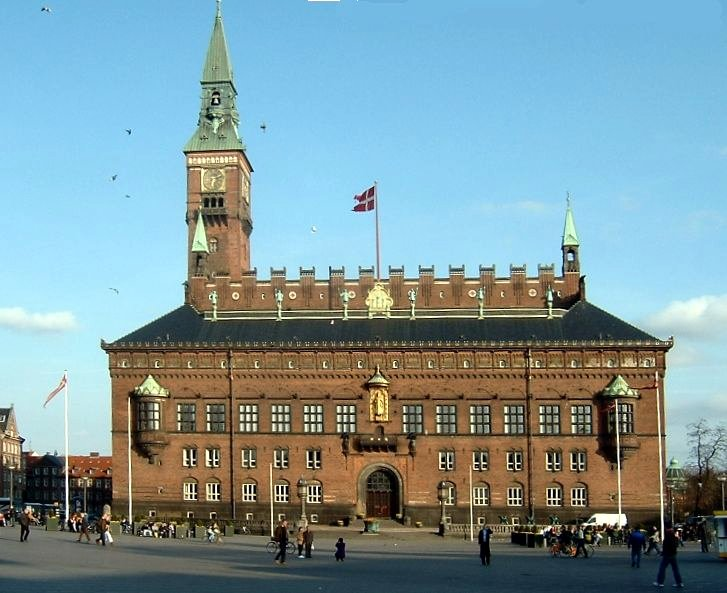
Copenhagen City Hall, situated on City Hall Square

Copenhagen Municipality is distinct from the wider Copenhagen urban area. The seat of Copenhagen's municipal council is the Copenhagen City Hall (Rådhus). The council is chaired by the Lord Mayor who oversees the civic duties of the fifty-five representatives of the council. The council usually meets every other week at 17:30 on a Thursday. They discuss a range of issues including business growth, economics, international cooperation and IT, urban planning, housing and construction, and young, old, and disabled peoples' issues, and healthcare, among others, with a central focus on making the city sustainable and meeting environmental and health targets.

All members of the council are elected every four years. In the municipal elections in November 2013 (see below), the Social Democrats remained in first place with 27.8% of the vote (down by 2.2% from 2009), while the Red-Green Alliance was in second place with 19.5%. In the 2021 elections, the Red-Green Alliance secured a higher vote total than the Social Democrats. This was the first time that a party other than the Social Democrats topped the ballot. The Social Democrats had claimed the office of mayor for more than 110 years, until it was finally won in 2025 by Sisse Marie Welling of the Green Left party.

The municipal government is divided into seven administrative departments: Employment and Integration, Culture and Leisure, Health and Care, Finance, Child and Youth, Social Services, and Technical and Environmental Administration. It has six political committees and a finance committee. The annual budget for the city is proposed in August and finalized in October and the annual report is published in May of every year. The accounting firm Deloitte is responsible for auditing the City of Copenhagen's accounts.

=== Lord mayors since 1938 ===
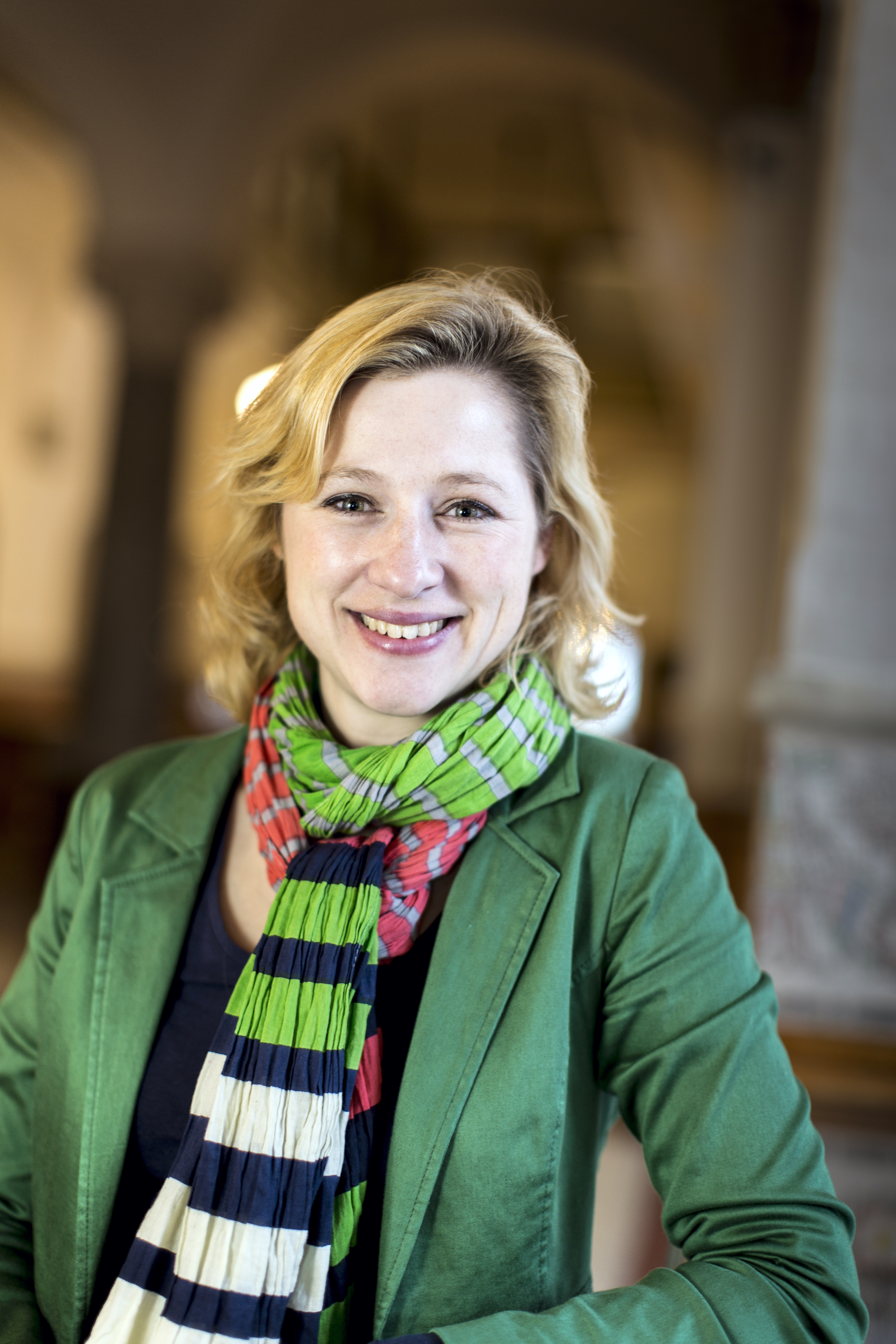
Sophie Hæstorp Andersen, former Lord Mayor

All lord mayors of Copenhagen until 2025 have belonged to the Social Democratic party.

- 1938–1946: Viggo Christensen
- 1946–1956: Hans Peter Sørensen
- 1956–1962: Sigvard Munk
- 1962–1976: Urban Hansen
- 1976–1989: Egon Weidekamp
- 1989–2004: Jens Kramer Mikkelsen
- 2004–2005: Lars Engberg
- 2006–2009: Ritt Bjerregaard
- 2010–2020: Frank Jensen
- 2020–2021: Lars Weiss (acting)
- 2022–2024: Sophie Hæstorp Andersen
- 2024–2025: Lars Weiss (acting)
- 2026–: Sisse Marie Welling

=== Municipal council ===
Copenhagen's municipal council consists of 55 members, elected every four years. Copenhagen's municipal council is by far the largest in Denmark, being the only municipal council with more than 31 seats.

Below are the municipal councils elected since 1909.

Election	Party																					Total seats	Elected mayor
Election	A	B	C	D	D	E	F	G	I	K	K	N	O	P	Q	V	Y	Z	Ø	Å	L	Total seats	Elected mayor
1909	20	5	16																		1	42	
1912	21	4	16																		1	42	
1913	27	5	22																		1	55	
1917	30	6	17																		2	55	
1921	33	4	16													2						55	
1925	31	6	17													1						55	
1929	35	4	16																			55	
1933	35	4	15							1												55	
1937	37	5	11							2												55	Viggo Christensen (A)
1943	32	6	15									1									1	55	Viggo Christensen (A)
1946	27	3	11							11						2					1	55	Hans Peter Sørensen (A)
1950	28	3	12			6				6												55	Hans Peter Sørensen (A)
1954	32	2	13			1				6						1						55	Hans Peter Sørensen (A)
1958	29	3	14			1				5						3						55	Sigvard Munk (A)
1962	27	2	15				9			1						1						55	Urban Hansen (A)
1966	23	2	15				13			1						1						55	Urban Hansen (A)
1970	31	5	11				5			1						1	1					55	Urban Hansen (A)
1974	22	3	6	1		1	7			7	1					1	2	3			1	55	Urban Hansen (A)
1978	26	1	8	1		1	3			5						1	5	3			1	55	Egon Weidekamp (A)
1981	22	3	8	1			7			2						2	8	2				55	Egon Weidekamp (A)
1985	18	1	9	1			15	2		1						1	7					55	Egon Weidekamp (A)
1989	20	1	6	2			13	2		1				2		2	4	2				55	Jens Kramer Mikkelsen (A)
1993	18	3	6				10	1						1		8		3	4		1	55	Jens Kramer Mikkelsen (A)
1997	17	3	5	1			8						6	1		6			7		1	55	Jens Kramer Mikkelsen (A)
2001	16	5	4	1			9						4			11			5			55	Jens Kramer Mikkelsen (A)
2005	21	7	3				7						3			8			6			55	Ritt Bjerregaard (A)
2009	17	5	4				13						4			6			6			55	Frank Jensen (A)
2013	16	6	3				6		2				4			7			11			55	Frank Jensen (A)
2017	15	5	3				5		2				3			5			11	6		55	Frank Jensen (A)
2021	10	6	8		1		6		1				1			5			15	2		55	Sophie Hæstorp Andersen (A)
2025	8	6	7				10		3				2		1	3			13	2		55	Sisse Marie Welling (F)
Election	A	B	C	D	D	E	F	G	I	K	K	N	O	P	Q	V	Y	Z	Ø	Å	L	Total seats	Elected mayor
Election	Party																					Total seats	Elected mayor
Data from Valg.dk, Dst.dk and Sa.dk

== Environmental Policy ==
In 2009 the Copenhagen Municipal Council decided that Copenhagen will become the world's first carbon-neutral capital by 2025. In 2012 the European Commission announced that Copenhagen would be the 2014 European Green Capital.

== See also ==
- List of cities and towns in Denmark
