= Vestamager =

Coordinates: 55°39′00″N 12°34′30″E

The districts of Copenhagen municipality: A: Indre By ("Copenhagen Center") B: Christianshavn C: Indre Østerbro ("Inner Østerbro") D: Ydre Østerbro ("Outer Østerbro") E: Indre Nørrebro ("Inner Nørrebro") F: Ydre Nørrebro ("Outer Nørrebro") G: Bispebjerg H: Vanløse I: Brønshøj-Husum J: Vesterbro K: Kongens Enghave L: Valby M: Vestamager N: Sundbyvester O: Sundbyøster

Vestamager most often refers to Kalvebod Fælled, but is also the name of one of the 15 administrative, statistical, and tax city districts (bydele) comprising the municipality of Copenhagen, Denmark. It lies on the south border of the municipality on the island of Amager. It covers an area of 13.99 km^{2}, has a population of 7,799 and a population density of 558 per km^{2}, making it both the largest district in area and the least densely populated district in Copenhagen.

Neighboring city districts are as follows:

- to the east is Sundbyvester
- to the north is Christianshavn, separated from Sundbyvester by Stadsgraven
- to the south is the part of Kalvebod Fælled that lies in Tårnby municipality

== See also ==
- Vestamager station
