= Indre Østerbro =

District of Copenhagen, Denmark

Coordinates: 55°42′N 12°35′E

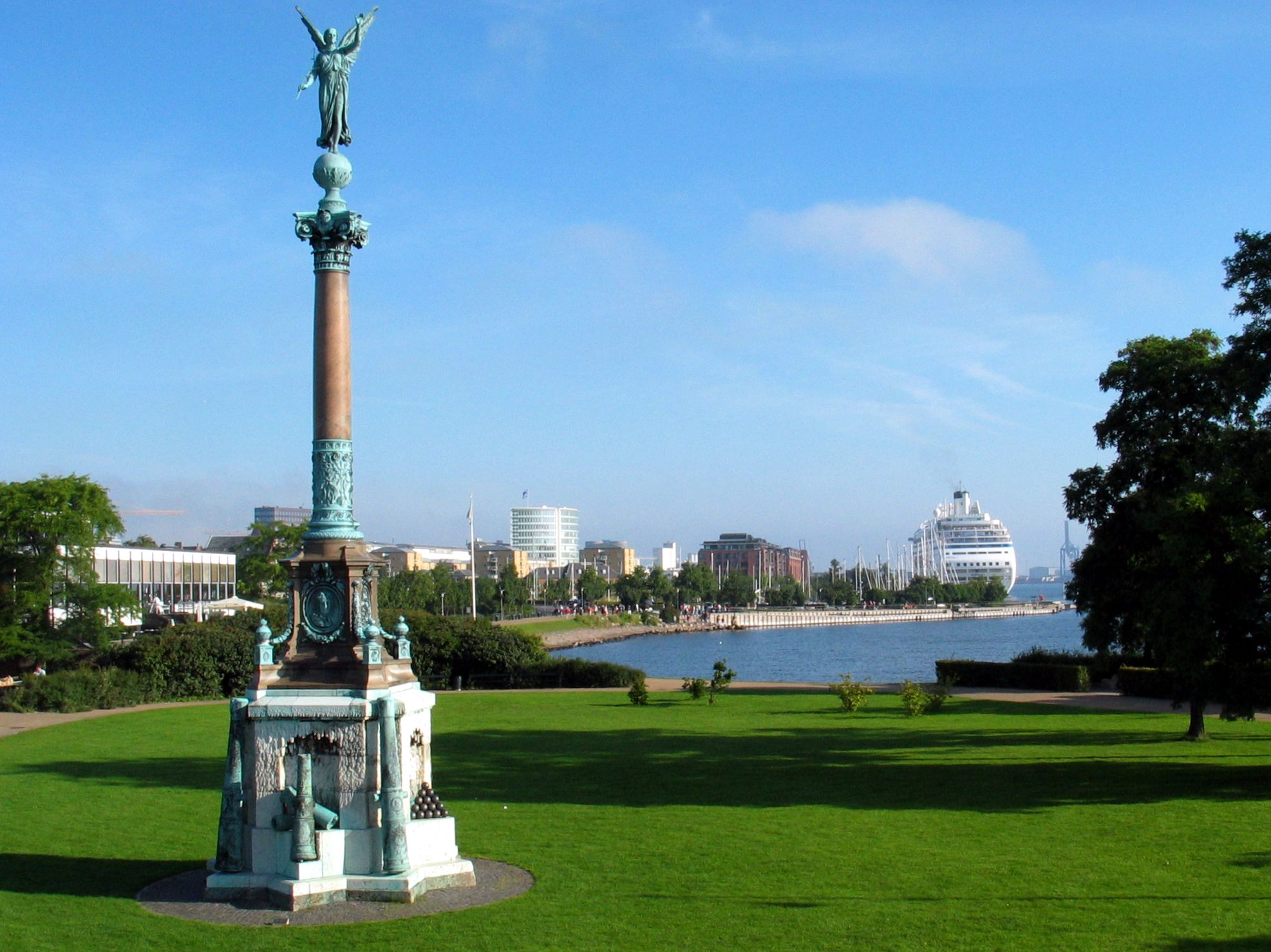
Langelinie in Indre Østerbro

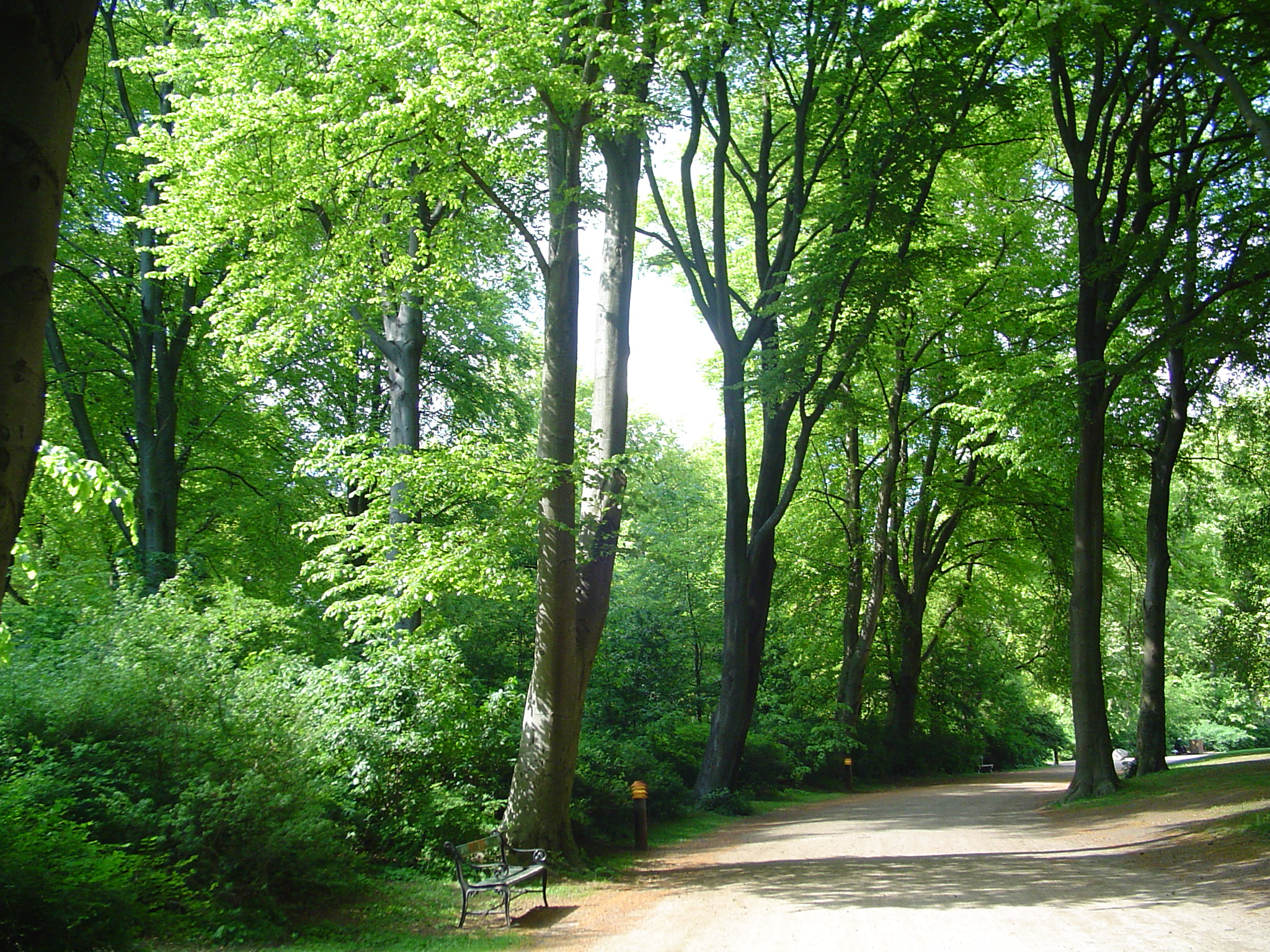
Fælledparken in Indre Østerbro

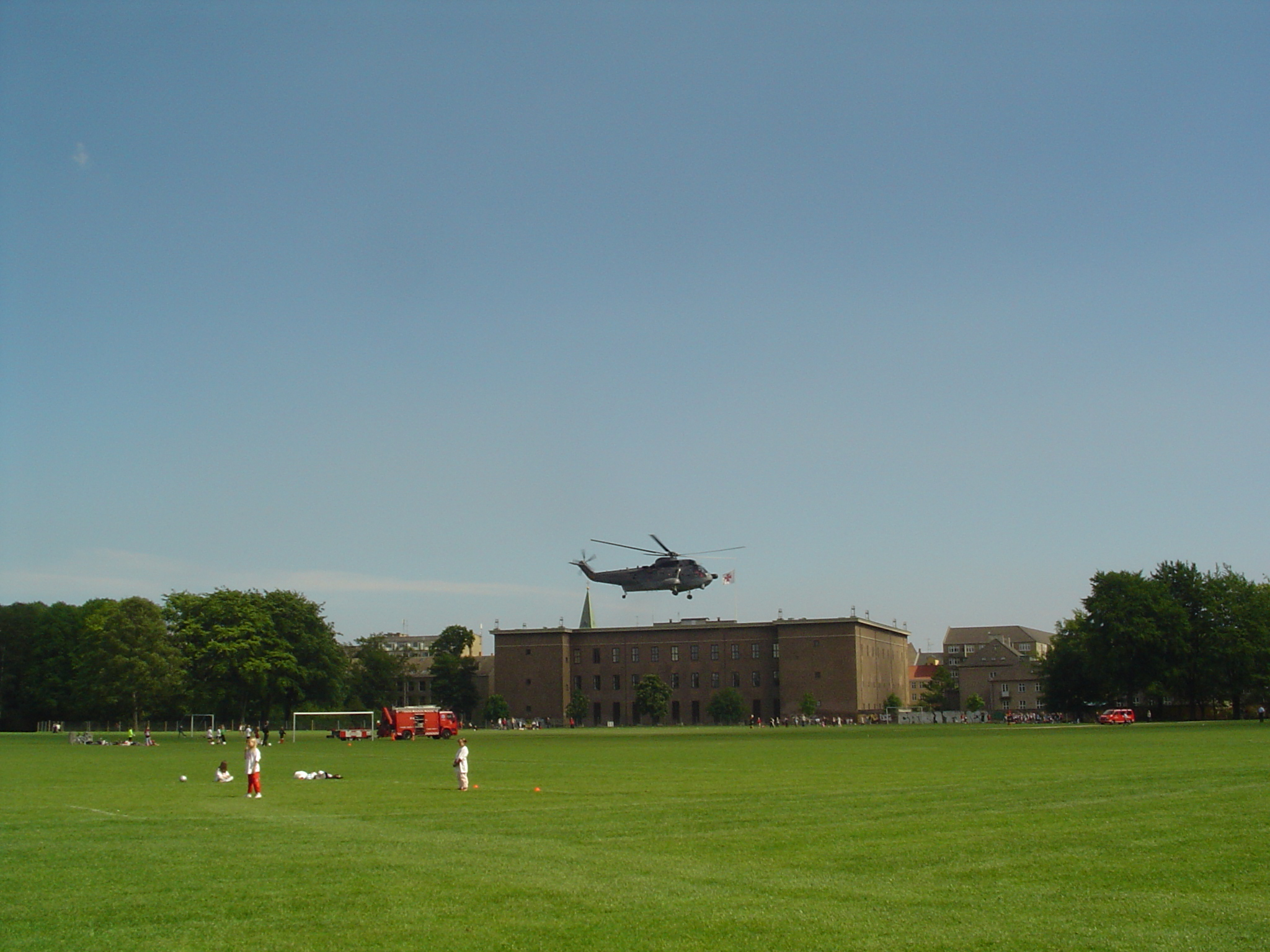
The building owned by the Danish Order of Freemasons in Indre Østerbro, seen from the park Fælledparken

Indre Østerbro (lit. English, "Inner Østerbro"), was one of the administrative, statistical, and tax city districts ("bydele") comprising the municipality of Copenhagen, Denmark. It lay on the eastern edge of the municipality. It covered an area of 6.76 km^{2}, had a population of 46,095 and a population density of 6,817 per km^{2}. Since 2007, the district has been part of the administrative district Østerbro.

Neighboring city districts were as follows:

- to the northwest was Ydre Østerbro
- to the west was Ydre Nørrebro
- to the southwest was Indre Nørrebro
- to the south was the Indre By, also known as "Copenhagen Center" or "Downtown Copenhagen" or "City"
- to the east and north was the Øresund, the strait which separates the island of Zealand from Sweden

Colloquially, the Indre Østerbro ("Inner Østerbro"), along with its neighboring city district to the northwest – Ydre Østerbro ("Outer Østerbro") – were sometimes collectively referred to as "Østerbro". But technically they were two separate legal units within Copenhagen municipality.

== The Indre Østerbro district ==
The 15 districts of Copenhagen municipality (2002-2007): A: Indre By ("Copenhagen Center") B: Christianshavn C: Indre Østerbro ("Inner Østerbro") D: Ydre Østerbro ("Outer Østerbro") E: Indre Nørrebro ("Inner Nørrebro") F: Ydre Nørrebro ("Outer Nørrebro") G: Bispebjerg H: Vanløse I: Brønshøj-Husum J: Vesterbro K: Kongens Enghave L: Valby M: Vestamager N: Sundbyvester O: Sundbyøster

The Indre Østerbro is located just outside Copenhagen's city center – the Inner City or Indre By – making it a very attractive place to live, as are the other areas immediately outside the center: the Indre Nørrebro ("Inner Nørrebro"), Vesterbro, Frederiksberg, and Christianshavn.

The district was located north of the city center at the location of the old Eastern Gate ("Østerport"), access way into the old city. The gate, along with the other three gates into the old city – Vesterport ("Western Gate") near the current Copenhagen City Hall (Københavns Rådhus), Nørreport ("Northern Gate") near the current Nørreport station, and Amagerport ("Amager Gate", i.e. functionally the Southern Gate) between Christianshavn and the island of Amager – were dismantled in 1856. Originally, the gate from the Middle Ages was located near present-day Kongens Nytorv in the center of Copenhagen. When Christian IV expanded the fortification of the inner city, he also moved the gate to near Kastellet, thus introducing the confusion that the Eastern Gate is located more northerly than the Northern Gate.

The name Østerbro is often compared to bridge, of which Denmark has many, into modern Danish, as English, "Eastern Bridge". The word is an old word and does not refer to a bridge, but to the borough. Therefore, its direct translation would be in English East Borough or Eastern Borough. A refined brick shaped version of cobbles.

The Indre Østerbro had advantage of a large park area, Fælledparken, and proximity to the harbour and water areas of Frihavn and Langelinie. Additionally it was less densely populated than the Nørrebro areas (the Inner Nørrebro and the Outer Nørrebro).

A number of embassies, including those of the United States, Canada, Great Britain, and Russia, are found in the district.

One of Copenhagen's "lakes" (Sortedam Lake) is also in the district.

== History ==
Until 1853, after the cholera epidemic that had hit Copenhagen, there had been a "no build" zone outside Copenhagen's old part of town, that which is now known as the Inner City or Indre By. This Demarcation Line (Demarkationslinien) indicated an area beyond the city's century's old defense wall system where Copenhagen's defense forces could strike the enemy unhindered.

Until then there was little development outside the center of town, except with special permission, and much of the area was used as grazing land.

With the abolishment of the demarcation line in 1853, the dismantling of the old fortifications that ringed the center of town in the late 1860s, and the removal of the old entrance gates to the city in 1856, the population quickly spread out to the “as yet” undeveloped areas outside the center. This movement came first to the inner ring of areas outside the center: the Indre Østerbro ("Inner Østerbro"), the Indre Nørrebro ("Inner Nørrebro"), Vesterbro, and Frederiksberg.

A well-known workers' movement confrontation, known as Slaget på Fælleden (English, "The Fight on the Commons"), took place on 5 May 1872 in the area that would later become Fælledparken, an early form of "people's park". The park, created on former grazing lands, was established 1906–1914, and is associated its annual May Day celebrations, including political speeches and people's festival.

In 1893, Østerport Train Station was built, still one of the city's busiest train stations.

In 1914, Den Frie Udstilling (“The Free Exhibition”) opened its doors as an art exhibition hall, and continues to bring alternative work to the public's attention.

== Landmarks ==
- Danish Order of Freemasons
- Den Frie Udstilling (English: The Free Exhibition)
- Fælledparken
- Garrison Cemetery
- Københavns Frihavn (English: The free port of Copenhagen)
- Langelinie, home of the statue of The Little Mermaid
- Parken Stadium
- Rigshospitalet
- Trianglen (English: The Triangle)
- Østerport Station

== See also ==
- Victor Borges Plads
