= Hjem til gården 2018 =

- Season 2
- Presented by: Lene Beier
- No. of days: 40
- No. of castaways: 14
- Winner: Jannie Bager Kristensen
- Runner-up: Lars Jannick Jørgensen
- Location: Engestofte, Denmark
- No. of episodes: 10

Release
- Original network: TV2
- Original release: 21 March – 23 May 2018

Season chronology
- ← Previous; 2017 Next → 2019

Hjem til gården 2018 (Home to the Farm 2018) is the second season of the Danish version of The Farm. 14 contestants from across Denmark come to the farm and live like it was 100 years ago. Each week, the head of the farm nominates one person to be in a duel, the nominee then chooses who they'll face off against in one of three challenges. The person who loses the duel is sent home but not before writing a letter delivered to the farm stating who the head of farm for the next week is. The winner wins a grand prize of 500,000 kr. The season was filmed in Engestofte, Denmark. The season premiered on 21 March 2018 and concluded on 23 May 2018 where Jannie Bager Kristensen won in the final duel against Lars Jannick Jørgensen to win the grand prize and be crowned the winner of Hjem til gården 2018.

== Finishing order ==
All contestants entered on Day 1.

Contestant	Age	Residence	Status	Finish
Dina Person	21	Slagelse	1st Evicted; Day 4	14th
John Hvidberg Rasmussen	48	Jyderup	Quit due to Injury; Day 6	13th
Hanne Mieth	66	Give	2nd Evicted; Day 8	12th
Mike Baltzersen	28	Copenhagen	3rd Evicted; Day 12	11th
Christina Poulsen	48	Kolding	4th Evicted; Day 16	10th
Benjamin "Benja" Bunch	32	Ballerup	5th Evicted; Day 20	9th
Sara Olsen	38	Copenhagen	6th Evicted; Day 24	8th
Allan Pedersen	50	Hjørring	7th Evicted; Day 28	7th
Maria Bøgelund	28	Hvidovre	8th Evicted; Day 32	6th
Ditte Rosenberg	23	Givskud	9th Evicted; Day 36	5th
Jeppe Deele	20	Copenhagen	10th Evicted; Day 39	3rd/4th
Benjamin Toustrup	32	Børkop	11th Evicted; Day 39	3rd/4th
Lars Jannick Jørgensen †	26	Taastrup	Runner-up; Day 40	2nd
Jannie Bager Kristensen	35	Nibe	Winner; Day 40	1st

== Future Appearances ==
Jeppe Deele returned in Hjem til gården 2019 as a fighter competing for a spot to enter the farm.

== The game ==
Week	Head of Farm	1st Dueler	2nd Dueler	Evicted	Finish
1	Christina	Dina	Ditte	Dina	1st Evicted; Day 4
2	Allan	Lars	Hanne	John	Left Competition; Day 6
2	Allan	Lars	Hanne	Hanne	2nd Evicted; Day 8
3	Benja	Mike	Benjamin	Mike	3rd Evicted; Day 12
4	Jannie	Benja	Christina	Christina	4th Evicted; Day 16
5	Sara	Benja	Lars	Benja	5th Evicted; Day 20
6	Jannie	Sara	Maria	Sara	6th Evicted; Day 24
7	Jeppe	Lars	Allan	Allan	7th Evicted; Day 28
8	Jannie	Maria	Jeppe	Maria	8th Evicted; Day 32
9	Benjamin	Jannie	Ditte	Ditte	9th Evicted; Day 36
10	Jury {Jannie} (Note: Jannie was picked by the jury to advance to the final 2. Therefore, she did not have to compete in the duel.)	All	All	Jeppe	10th Evicted; Day 39
10	Jury {Jannie}	All	All	Benjamin	11th Evicted; Day 39
Final Duel				Lars	Runner-up; Day 40
Final Duel				Jannie	Winner; Day 40
