= Hjem til gården 2020 =

- Season 4
- Presented by: Lene Beier
- No. of days: 40
- No. of castaways: 14
- Winner: Kasper Gregersen
- Runner-up: Jesper Holmgaard
- Location: Denmark
- No. of episodes: 10

Release
- Original network: TV2
- Original release: 21 June – 23 August 2020

Season chronology
- ← Previous; 2019 Next → 2021

Hjem til gården 2020 (Home to the Farm 2020) is the fourth season of the Danish version of The Farm. 14 contestants from across Denmark come to the farm and live like it was 100 years ago. Each week, the head of the farm nominates one person to be in a duel, the nominee then chooses who they'll face off against in one of three challenges. The person who loses the duel is sent home but not before writing a letter delivered to the farm stating who the head of farm for the next week is. The winner wins a grand prize of 500,000 kr.

The season was originally set to premiere on 29 March 2020 but was pushed back due to the COVID-19 pandemic. As a result, the season ended up premiering on 21 June 2020.

== Finishing order ==
All contestants entered on Day 1

Contestant	Age	Residence	Status	Finish
Hanne Schnoor Fogh	39	Mørke	1st Evicted; Day 4	14th
Liselotte Tolsgaard	56	Vejle	2nd Evicted; Day 8	13th
Dan Lorenzen	36	Nørresundby	Quit due to Injury; Day 10	12th
Ulrik Petersen	22	Holbæk	3rd Evicted; Day 12	11th
Havva Turhan	43	Skælskør	4th Evicted; Day 16	10th
Henrik Søndergaard	49	Vejle	5th Evicted; Day 20	9th
Kenneth Berg Pedersen	33	Hammel	6th Evicted; Day 24	8th
Michael Lyster Brams	29	Aarhus	7th Evicted; Day 28	7th
Marie Davos	29	Christiania	8th Evicted; Day 32	6th
Victoria Kahr	19	Bjæverskov	9th Evicted; Day 36	5th
Tina Jakobsen	33	Vanløse	10th Evicted; Day 39	3rd/4th
Michelle Larsen	36	Aarhus	11th Evicted; Day 39	3rd/4th
Jesper Holmgaard	35	Hobro	Runner-up; Day 40	2nd
Kasper Gregersen	25	Aarhus	Winner; Day 40	1st

== The game ==
Week	Head of Farm	1st Dueler	2nd Dueler	Evicted	Finish
1	Michael	Havva	Hanne	Hanne	1st Evicted; Day 4
2	Henrik	Liselotte	Michelle	Liselotte	2nd Evicted; Day 8
3	Marie	Henrik	Ulrik	Dan	Quit due to Injury; Day 10
3	Marie	Henrik	Ulrik	Ulrik	3rd Evicted; Day 12
4	Victoria	Henrik	Havva	Havva	4th Evicted; Day 16
5	Jesper	Henrik	Michael	Henrik	5th Evicted; Day 20
6	Kasper	Kenneth	Michelle	Kenneth	6th Evicted; Day 24
7	Tina	Michael	Michelle	Michael	7th Evicted; Day 28
8	Jesper	Marie	Victoria	Marie	8th Evicted; Day 32
9	Michelle	Jesper	Victoria	Victoria	9th Evicted; Day 36
10	Jury {Jesper} (Note: Jesper was picked by the jury to advance to the final 2. Therefore, he did not have to compete in the duel.)	Kasper; Michelle; Tina		Tina	10th Evicted; Day 39
10	Jury {Jesper}	Kasper; Michelle; Tina		Michelle	11th Evicted; Day 39
Final Duel				Jesper	Runner-up; Day 40
Final Duel				Kasper	Winner; Day 40
