= 2025 Tårnby municipal election =

Municipal election in Denmark

← 2021	18 November 2025	2029 →

All 19 seats to the Tårnby municipal council 10 seats needed for a majority
- Turnout: 22,585 (66.5%) ▲2.9%
	First party	Second party	Third party
	A	O	F
Party	Social Democrats	Danish People's Party	Green Left
Last election	8 seats, 39.7%	1 seat, 7.4%	1 seat, 5.2%
Seats won	7	3	2
Seat change	▼1	▲2	▲1
Popular vote	7,402	3,234	2,371
Percentage	33.4%	14.6%	10.7%
Swing	▼6.2%	▲7.2%	▲5.6%
	Fourth party	Fifth party	Sixth party
	Ø	C	V
Party	Red-Green Alliance	Conservatives	Venstre
Last election	1 seat, 8.7%	2 seats, 9.5%	3 seats, 14.1%
Seats won	2	2	1
Seat change	▲1	0	▼2
Popular vote	1,840	1,673	1,296
Percentage	8.3%	7.6%	5.9%
Swing	▼0.4%	▼1.9%	▼8.3%
	Seventh party	Eighth party	Ninth party
	I	M	B
Party	Liberal Alliance	Moderates	Social Liberals
Last election	0 seats, 0.8%	Did not stand	1 seat, 3.8%
Seats won	1	1	0
Seat change	▲1	▲1	▼1
Popular vote	1,154	829	895
Percentage	5.2%	3.7%	4.0%
Swing	▲4.4%	New	▲0.3%
Mayor before election
Allan Andersen
Social Democrats
Mayor after election
Allan Andersen
Social Democrats

The 2025 Tårnby Municipal election was held on November 18, 2025, to elect the 19 members to sit in the regional council for the Tårnby Municipal council, in the period of 2026 to 2029. Allan Andersen from the Social Democrats, would secure re-election.

== Background ==
Following the 2021 election, Allan Andersen from Social Democrats became mayor for his second term.

== Electoral system ==
For elections to Danish municipalities, a number varying from 9 to 31 are chosen to be elected to the municipal council. The seats are then allocated using the D'Hondt method and a closed list proportional representation. Tårnby Municipality had 19 seats in 2025.

== Electoral alliances ==
=== Electoral Alliance 1 ===
Party		Political alignment
A	Social Democrats	Centre-left
E	Velfærdslisten	Local politics

=== Electoral Alliance 2 ===
Party		Political alignment
B	Social Liberals	Centre to Centre-left
F	Green Left	Centre-left to Left-wing
Ø	Red-Green Alliance	Left-wing to Far-Left

=== Electoral Alliance 3 ===
Party		Political alignment
C	Conservatives	Centre-right
I	Liberal Alliance	Centre-right to Right-wing
M	Moderates	Centre to Centre-right
O	Danish People's Party	Right-wing to Far-right
V	Venstre	Centre-right
Æ	Denmark Democrats	Right-wing to Far-right

== Results by polling station ==
Division	A	B	C	E	F	I	M	O	T	V	Æ	Ø
Division	%	%	%	%	%	%	%	%	%	%	%	%
Vestamager	31.1	3.4	8.8	0.2	9.0	6.4	3.1	19.1	3.6	6.7	2.9	5.7
Pilegården	30.6	4.8	10.4	0.1	10.7	6.1	4.6	11.5	3.1	8.9	2.1	7.1
Tårnby (Nordregårdsskolens Festsal)	35.1	4.2	6.1	0.9	11.8	4.2	3.8	14.6	3.0	4.8	2.5	8.9
Korsvejen	34.3	4.6	7.0	0.1	12.4	5.1	3.0	12.6	4.1	4.7	2.2	9.9
Løjtegården	31.8	4.7	8.8	0.2	10.9	5.6	6.6	11.5	3.8	5.8	2.4	7.8
Kastrup (Skottegårdsskolens Aula)	36.4	3.1	5.2	0.2	10.2	4.2	2.4	16.8	4.5	4.3	2.9	9.9

== Results ==
Party		Votes	%	+/-	Seats	+/-
Tårnby Municipality
A	Social Democrats	7,402	33.43	-6.24	7	-1
O	Danish People's Party	3,234	14.61	+7.24	3	+2
F	Green Left	2,371	10.71	+5.56	2	+1
Ø	Red-Green Alliance	1,840	8.31	-0.42	2	+1
C	Conservatives	1,673	7.56	-1.91	2	0
V	Venstre	1,296	5.85	-8.26	1	-2
I	Liberal Alliance	1,154	5.21	+4.38	1	+1
B	Social Liberals	895	4.04	+0.26	0	-1
M	Moderates	829	3.74	New	1	New
T	Tårnby Listen	828	3.74	-2.55	0	-1
Æ	Denmark Democrats	558	2.52	New	0	New
E	Velfærdslisten	62	0.28	New	0	New
Total		22,142	100	N/A	19	N/A
Invalid votes		81	0.24	-0.01		
Blank votes		362	1.07	+0.27		
Turnout		22,585	66.52	+2.86		
Source: valg.dk

== Opinion polls ==
Polling firm	Fieldwork date	Sample size	A	V	C	Ø	O	T	F	B	I	E	M	Æ	Others	Lead
Epinion	4 Sep - 13 Oct 2025	473	42.4	6.0	6.8	6.9	10.2	–	10.6	1.6	6.9	–	2.1	5.7	0.8	31.8
2024 european parliament election	9 Jun 2024		20.2	9.4	7.8	7.2	9.5	–	18.9	7.0	6.0	–	6.1	5.3	–	1.3
2022 general election	1 Nov 2022		36.5	9.7	4.3	4.9	4.4	–	8.2	2.6	6.5	–	8.6	5.7	–	26.8
2021 regional election	16 Nov 2021		37.1	12.8	11.5	8.9	7.8	–	6.8	5.1	1.1	–	–	–	–	24.3
2021 municipal election	16 Nov 2021		39.7 (8)	14.1 (3)	9.5 (2)	8.7 (1)	7.4 (1)	6.3 (1)	5.2 (1)	3.8 (1)	0.8 (0)	–	–	–	–	25.6
