= Hjem til gården 2021 =

- Season 5
- Presented by: Lene Beier
- No. of days: 40
- No. of castaways: 14
- Winner: Simon Borch Rasmussen
- Runner-up: Hanne Holdt-Simonsen
- Location: Rudegaard, Falster, Denmark
- No. of episodes: 10

Release
- Original network: TV2
- Original release: 14 March – 16 May 2021

Season chronology
- ← Previous; 2020

Hjem til gården 2021 (Home to the Farm 2021) is the fifth and final season of the Danish version of The Farm. 14 contestants from across Denmark come to the farm and live like it was 100 years ago. Each week, the head of the farm nominates one person to be in a duel, the nominee then chooses who they'll face off against in one of three challenges. The person who loses the duel is sent home but not before writing a letter delivered to the farm stating who the head of farm for the next week is. The winner wins a grand prize of 500,000 kr. This year, the season was filmed on a farm in Rudegaard on the island of Falster. The season premiered on 14 March 2021 and concluded on 16 May 2021 when Simon Borch Rasmussen won in a final duel against Hanne Holdt-Simonsen to win and become the last winner of Hjem til gården.

== Finishing order ==
All contestants entered on Day 1.

Contestant	Age	Residence	Status	Finish
Signe Hyllested	43	Frederiksberg	1st Evicted; Day 4	14th
Stig Ørebek Pedersen	65	Brabrand	2nd Evicted; Day 8	13th
Bianca Tammaro	31	Solrød Strand	Quit; Day 12	12th
Joekim "Joe" Nielsen	43	Boeslunde	3rd Evicted; Day 16	11th
Mette Ebbesen	25	Copenhagen	4th Evicted; Day 20	10th
Martin "MK" Kastner	46	Ugerløse	5th Evicted; Day 24	9th
Michelle Jørgensen	28	Aarhus	6th Evicted; Day 28	8th
Jonas Haagensen	40	Vejle	Quit; Day 31	7th
Marianne Christensen	39	Copenhagen	7th Evicted; Day 32	6th
Mikkel Svendsen	26	Slagelse	8th Evicted; Day 36	5th
Martin Bang Sehje	27	Copenhagen	9th Evicted; Day 39	3rd/4th
Daniel Birch	31	Højbjerg	10th Evicted; Day 39	3rd/4th
Hanne Holdt-Simonsen	57	Borup	Runner-up; Day 40	2nd
Simon Borch Rasmussen	29	Valby	Winner; Day 40	1st

== The game ==
Week	Head of Farm	1st Dueler	2nd Dueler	Evicted	Finish
1	Marianne	Stig	Signe	Signe	1st Evicted; Day 4
2	Jonas	Mikkel	Stig	Stig	2nd Evicted; Day 8
3	Hanne	Martin	Bianca	Bianca	Left Competition; Day 12
4	Mette	Jonas	Joe	Joe	3rd Evicted; Day 16
5	Mikkel	Mette	Hanne	Mette	4th Evicted; Day 20
6	Michelle	MK	Mikkel	MK	5th Evicted; Day 24
7	Hanne	Martin	Michelle	Michelle	6th Evicted; Day 28
8	Jonas	Marianne	Daniel	Jonas	Left Competition; Day 31
8	Jonas	Marianne	Daniel	Marianne	7th Evicted; Day 32
9	Daniel	Simon	Mikkel	Mikkel	8th Evicted; Day 36
10	Jury {Simon} (Note: Simon was picked by the jury to advance to the final 2. Therefore, he did not have to compete in the duel.)	All	All	Martin	9th Evicted; Day 39
10	Jury {Simon}	All	All	Daniel	10th Evicted; Day 39
Final Duel				Hanne	Runner-up; Day 40
Final Duel				Simon	Winner; Day 40
