= Hjem til gården 2019 =

- Season 3
- Presented by: Lene Beier
- No. of days: 40
- No. of castaways: 14
- Winner: Peter Ole Finnemann Viuff
- Runner-up: Tom Hedegaard
- Location: Denmark
- No. of episodes: 10

Release
- Original network: TV2
- Original release: 17 March – 26 May 2019

Season chronology
- ← Previous; 2018 Next → 2020

Hjem til gården 2019 (Home to the Farm 2019) is the third season of the Danish version of The Farm. 12 contestants from across Denmark come to the farm and live like it was 100 years ago. The season is hosted by Lene Beier once again with the farm mentor Philip Dam Hansen returning as well. The main twist this season is the introduction of Ødegården, where eliminated contestants join two former contestants competing for a chance to renter the farm. The season premiered on 17 March 2019 and concluded on 26 May 2019 where Peter Ole Finnemann Viuff won in the final duel against Tom Hedegaard in the final duel to win the grand prize of 500,000kr.

== Contestants ==
Contestant	Age	Residence	Entered	Exited	Status	Finish
Kristina Kristensen	41	Brønderslev	Day 1	Day 2	Quit; Day 2	13th
Søren Juhl	38	Rødekro	Day 1	Day 8	1st Evicted; Day 8	12th
Maria Dong-Kruse	43	Nørrebro	Day 1	Day 12	2nd Evicted; Day 12	11th
Cecilie Nielsen	24	Korsør	Day 1	Day 15	Quit; Day 15	10th
Esmaeil Roudsari	27	Hvidovre	Day 1	Day 20	4th Evicted; Day 20	9th
Søren Lassen "Lassen" Matthiasen	30	Aalborg	Day 1	Day 24	5th Evicted; Day 24	8th
Søren Christensen	39	Sønderborg	Day 25	Day 28	6th Evicted; Day 28	7th
Malou Friis Hulehøj Larsen	22	Rønde	Day 1	Day 32	7th Evicted; Day 32	6th
John Holmgren Brohammer Jensen	37	Copenhagen	Day 1	Day 36	8th Evicted; Day 36	5th
Anna Zoé Hermansen	32	Copenhagen	Day 1	Day 39	9th Evicted; Day 39	3rd/4th
Rikke Besser	25	Viby J	Day 1	Day 39	10th Evicted; Day 39	3rd/4th
Tom Hedegaard	55	Viborg	Day 1	Day 40	Runner-up; Day 40	2nd
Peter Ole Finnemann Viuff	54	Trige	Day 1	Day 16	3rd Evicted; Day 16	1st
Peter Ole Finnemann Viuff	54	Trige	Day 25	Day 40	Winner; Day 40	1st

== Ødegården ==
New to the series is Ødegården where contestants will be given a second chance to try and re-enter the competition. After their elimination, they are taken to Ødegården where they will meet two former contestants of Hjem til gården where they'll compete in duels, where the loser is eliminated from the game. After seven weeks, the last two competitors to remain in Ødegården will win a spot back into the game.

Contestant	Season	Age	Residence	Entered	Exited	Status	Finish
Søren Juhl	2019	38	Rødekro	Day 8	Day 10	Lost Duel; Day 10	7th
Maria Dong-Kruse	2019	43	Nørrebro	Day 12	Day 14	Lost Duel; Day 14	6th
Esmaeil Roudsari	2019	27	Hvidovre	Day 20	Day 22	Lost Duel; Day 22	5th
Søren Lassen "Lassen" Matthiasen	2019	30	Aalborg	Day 24	Day 24	Quit; Day 24	4th
Jeppe Deele	2018	20	Copenhagen	Day 1	Day 25	Lost Duel; Day 25	3rd
Peter Ole Finnemann Viuff	2019	54	Trige	Day 16	Day 25	Returned to Farm; Day 25	1st
Søren Christensen	2017	39	Sønderborg	Day 1	Day 25	Entered Farm; Day 25	1st

=== Ødegården duels ===
Week	Dueler(s)	Evicted	Finish
3	Søren C. Søren J.	Søren J.	Lost Duel; Day 10
4	Jeppe; Maria	Maria	Lost Duel; Day 14
5	Esmaeil; Søren C.	Esmaeil	Lost Duel; Day 22
6	None	Lassen	Quit; Day 24
7	Jeppe; Peter; Søren C.	Jeppe	Lost Duel; Day 25

== The game ==
Week	Head of Farm	1st Dueler	2nd Dueler	Evicted	Finish
1	Kristina	None		Kristina	Quit; Day 2
2	Esmaeil	Søren J.	Peter	Søren J.	1st Evicted; Day 8
3	Lassen	Maria	Malou	Maria	2nd Evicted; Day 12
4	Esmaeil	Peter	Esmaeil	Cecile	Quit; Day 15
4	Esmaeil	Peter	Esmaeil	Peter	3rd Evicted; Day 16
5	Malou	Tom	Esmaeil	Esmaeil	4th Evicted; Day 20
6	Anna	Lassen	Rikke	Lassen	5th Evicted; Day 24
7	John	Søren C.	Peter	Søren C.	6th Evicted; Day 28
8	Rikke	Malou	Anna	Malou	7th Evicted; Day 32
9	Peter	John	Tom	John	8th Evicted; Day 36
10	Jury {Peter} (Note: Peter was picked by the jury to advance to the final 2. Therefore, he did not have to compete in the duel.)	Anna; Rikke; Tom		Anna	9th Evicted; Day 39
10	Jury {Peter}	Anna; Rikke; Tom		Rikke	10th Evicted; Day 39
Final Duel				Tom	Runner-up; Day 40
Final Duel				Peter	Winner; Day 40
