= Nordvest =

Area of Copenhagen municipality, Denmark

Coordinates: 55°42.6′N 12°31.7′E

Nordvest (lit.: Northwest, short form of Copenhagen North West) or The North West Block is an area in Denmark's Copenhagen municipality. It is located in the southwestern part of the Bispebjerg district. Although there are no clear borders nor any official demarcation, it is broadly recognized as the area covered mostly by the Danish postal code 2400 København NV (NV being shorthand for Nordvest), although some areas lie outside this postal code. As of 2005, 44,177 people resided in the area.

== History ==
A large area of the current Nordvest previously formed part of the Brønshøj-Rødovre municipality, which consisted mostly of low-density housing and small businesses. In the early 20th century, the Copenhagen municipality annexed the area from the Brønshøj-Rødovre municipality in order to construct a "socially democratic ideal where one can live from cradle to grave without moving more than a few blocks." Consequently, in the following years a large number of social housing units and homeless shelters were constructed and soon populated by evicted residents from central Copenhagen (which was undergoing a housing "sanitization" during this time). Along with the construction of social housing, the area's readily available workforce also built small and large industrial complexes in the unused areas between the houses. This gave rise to the construction of different kinds of housing, such as the typografernes hus (lit.: typographer's housing), a type of housing in which residents live in the above-ground area and old, functional printing presses are housed in the basement.

Throughout the 1980s, the Nordvest was increasingly characterized as an area for apartments, which were relatively inexpensive compared to those in the surrounding areas of Copenhagen. In 1980, the area was designated by the community psychiatric authorities to house people with mental health diagnoses in the community. However, soon thereafter there was a spike in vandalism and assaults. In 1993, the Ministry of Housing, the Ministry of Social Affairs, and the Copenhagen municipality agreed on a "holistic effort in the Nordvest" to improve the situation. This would later serve as a model and precursor for later area improvement projects elsewhere in Denmark.

By 2013, the area had experienced a partial urban regeneration, characterized by an ethnically diverse population and a wide range of small businesses, while the industrial complexes were largely renovated and converted to modern housing. A film on the subject was directed by Michael Noer.

== Characteristics and attractions ==
The area is bordered (from the north, clockwise) by the remaining part of Bispebjerg, the districts Østerbro and Nørrebro, the municipality of Frederiksberg, and the districts Vanløse and Brønshøj-Husum. The major roads Tagensvej, Frederiksborgvej, Tuborgvej/Tomsgårdsvej/Hjulgårdsvej, Borups Allé, and Hillerødgade all cut through Nordvest.

Two large green areas can be found in the area: Utterslev Mose is the northwest border of the area, and the Bispebjerg Kirkegård cemetery is near the center. Smaller green areas include the Emaljehaven (lit.: the Enamel Garden), a renovated green area that previously housed a large metal workshop, Rødkilde park (lit.: Red Spring park), which hosts the Rødkilde Nature Playground and the Nordvestparken (lit.: the North West park), constructed in 2009, which won the Danish Light Award in 2010.

The earlier social housing and industrial buildings have undergone a transformation: while many of the old buildings are still standing, they have been repurposed. Most of the old buildings have not been modernized, and only some have been partially modernized. With the relocation of much of the industry to less populated areas, the old industrial complexes provide an opportunity for modern housing and activities. One such example of the modernization of the old Ungdomshuset area was the creation of a large cultural creativity space, Bolsjefabrikken (lit. the candy factory), housed in an old smithy and plumbing factory. The area's rugged image persists, and because of this it has acquired the nicknames Nordværst (North Worst) and Nordlædervest (North Leather Vest). As a result, housing costs are comparatively lower than other areas of Copenhagen; in the neighboring district of Østerbro and the neighboring municipality of Frederiksberg, housing prices are on average 50% higher than in Nordvest. Crime rates, however, are the same as in most of urban Copenhagen.

Even though the area is formally a part of the district Bispebjerg, the Nordvest is often associated with the district Nørrebro, and Copenhagen municipality is actively creating a more pervasive integration of Nordvest and Nørrebro.

== Notable people ==
- Jan Sonnergaard – author
