= Hjem til gården 2017 =

- Season 1
- Presented by: Lene Beier
- No. of days: 40
- No. of castaways: 14
- Winner: Trine Cecile Enevoldsen
- Runner-up: Jacob Grum-Schwensen
- Location: Denmark
- No. of episodes: 10

Release
- Original network: TV2
- Original release: 20 March – 22 May 2017

Season chronology
- Next → 2018

Hjem til gården 2017 (Home to the Farm 2017) is the first season of the Danish version of The Farm. 14 contestants from across Denmark come to the farm and live like it was 100 years ago. Each week, the head of the farm nominates one person to be in a duel, the nominee then chooses who they'll face off against in one of three challenges. The person who loses the duel is sent home but not before writing a letter delivered to the farm stating who the head of farm for the next week is. The winner wins a grand prize of 500,000 kr. The season premiered on 20 March 2017 and concluded on 22 May 2017 when Trine Cecile Enevoldsen won in the final duel against Jacob Grum-Schwensen to win the grand prize and become the first winner of Hjem til gården.

== Finishing order ==
Amongst the contestants is former Paradise Hotel 2013 contestant Freja Rosa Dissing Christiansen.
All contestants entered on Day 1.

Contestant	Age	Residence	Status	Finish
Navid Bazgir	21	Brøndby Strand	1st Evicted; Day 4	14th
Reci Højup-Bech	52	Haderslev	2nd Evicted; Day 8	13th
Johanna Bobek	28	Frederiksberg	Quit; Day 8	12th
Annet Namukasa	29	Valby	3rd Evicted; Day 15	11th
Thomas Gjeding	43	Aarhus	Quit; Day 20	10th
Søren Christiansen	37	Svendborg	4th Evicted; Day 22	9th
Line Daniel	25	Thisted	5th Evicted; Day 26	8th
Marcus Faurby Stengaard	28	Valby	6th Evicted; Day 30	7th
Freja Rosa Dissing Christiansen	23	Hjørring	7th Evicted; Day 34	6th
Kasper Brock Jørgensen	30	Horsens	8th Evicted; Day 36	5th
Ulla Malmos	53	Hammel	9th Evicted; Day 38	4th
Frederik Bingen Jacobsen	23	Amager	10th Evicted; Day 39	3rd
Jacob Grum-Schwensen	49	Farum	Runner-up; Day 40	2nd
Trine Cecile Enevoldsen	36	Silkeborg	Winner; Day 40	1st

== Future Appearances ==
Søren Christiansen returned in Hjem til gården 2019 as a fighter competing for a spot to enter the farm.

== The game ==
Week	Head of Farm	1st Dueler	2nd Dueler	Evicted	Finish
1	Thomas	Søren	Navid	Navid	1st Evicted; Day 4
2	Annet	Søren	Reci	Reci	2nd Evicted; Day 8
2	Annet	Søren	Reci	Johanna	Left Competition; Day 8
3	Line	Annet	Trine	Annet	3rd Evicted; Day 15
4	Jacob	Søren	Marcus	Thomas	Left Competition; Day 20
4	Jacob	Søren	Marcus	Søren	4th Evicted; Day 22
5	Frederik	Kasper	Line	Line	5th Evicted; Day 26
6	Freja	Jacob	Marcus	Marcus	6th Evicted; Day 30
7	Trine	Freja	Ulla	Freja	7th Evicted; Day 34
8	Ulla	Frederik	Kasper	Kasper	8th Evicted; Day 36
9	Trine	Jacob	Ulla	Ulla	9th Evicted; Day 38
10	None {Jacob} (Note: Jacob was chosen by the jury to advance to the final two. As a result, he didn't partake in the duel.)	Trine	Frederik	Frederik	10th Evicted; Day 39
10	Final Duel			Jacob	Runner-up; Day 40
10	Final Duel			Trine	Winner; Day 40
