= Copenhagen Puppet Festival =

Copenhagen Puppet Festival is a biennial adult puppetry festival organized by Kulturanstalten, in the borough of Vesterbro in Copenhagen.

== History ==
The first Copenhagen Puppet Festival was held in 2006, but Kulturanstalten have organized puppet events before this, such as Punch and Judy and the Brats in 2004, and Re:Frankenstein by Stuffed PuppetTheatre.

In 2006 four performances for young people and adults toured Kulturhuset Vesterbro (now Kulturanstalten), Kulturhuset Islands Brygge, Vesterbro Bibliotek (Vesterbro Library, now Kulturanstalten), the Central Train Station, and bus 3A where they played a total of 12 shows. Among the performers were Moving People (UK/F). There was also a workshop aimed at teenagers, in collaboration with Teater Graense-Loes.

In 2007 the first Copenhagen Puppet Festival was organized, with a programme that included both adult and child performances. The festival presented performances from groups such as Pickled Image, Teater Graense-Loes, Garlic Theatre and La Cie Pairs et Fils. In addition Marcin Bikowskis performed at the Night Scene. The festival also presented talks, lectures and debates.

The festival was organized by Børnekulturstedet på Vesterbro (The Children's Culture Place in Vesterbro), and in cooperation with Nordland Visual Theatre, Vesterbro Library, Teater Huset, and UNIMA Denmark.

In 2009 the festival had different focus on stage and off stage. The on-stage focus was the good story told as simply as possible, and the visible puppeteer. The off-stage programme focused on traditions and developments outside Denmark.

The performances were by groups such as Blind Summit Theatre, Stugu/Romme Produktioner, Ze Patrecathodics & Cie, Vincent de Rooij, Compagnie Le Grand Manipule, Théâtre d'Ombre. The Night Scene contributors were, among others, students from The London School of Puppetry and Ludwik Solski Academy for the Dramatic Arts in Cracow, Wroclaw Branch.
