= Telavox =

Danish manufacturer of loudspeakers, radios, and televisions

Yelavow
- Company type: Private
- Industry: Home electronics
- Founded: 1924
- Founder: Clemen Jørgensen
- Fate: Acquired on 1 April 1952
- Successor: To-R
- Headquarters: Copenhagen, Denmark
- Key people: Clemen Jørgensen (CEO)
- Products: Loudspeakers, radios, tvs, clocks

Telavox was a Danish manufacturer of loudspeakers, radios and televisions established in 1924 by Clemen Jørgensen in Copenhagen, Denmark. The company was from 1929 based in Vanløse. It was acquired by To-R in 1952.

The company established a production of clocks during World War II. The clocks were sold under the name Clementa by a separate company, after 1952.

== History ==
Clemen Jørgensen (1893–1932), a clock-maker from Silkeborg, moved to Copenhagen in 1921. In 1924, he established a production of horn loudspeakers in his own apartment. In 1925, he moved the activities to a backroom on Hostrupsvej. They were sold under the name Element through the wholesaler J. Axel Christensen & Co. at Nørrevoldgade 52. Later in 1925, Jørgensen established a production line in a building in the courtyard at Borgergade 108. His brother, Magnus Jørgensen, a furniture-maker, became a partner in the company. Their loudspeakers were sold under the brand D.N.D. (short for Den Nye Danske, English: The New Danish).

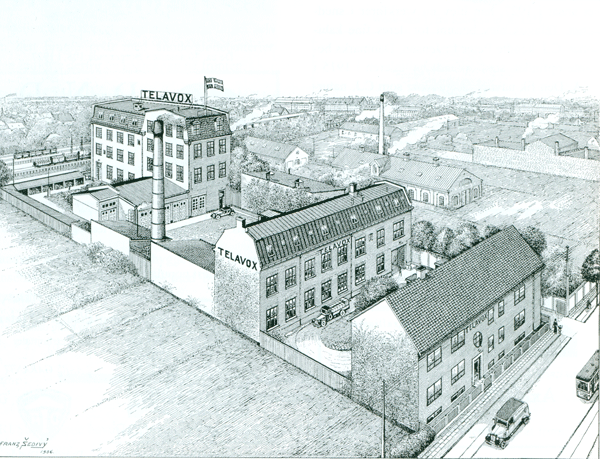
The Telavox factory in 1936

Jørgensen was an acquaintance of the inventor Peter L. Jensen who had established Magnavox in 1927. Jensen proposed Jørgensen to use the name Telavox.

In 1929, Jørgensen bought a factory at Apollovej 31 in Vanløse. The company had now also established a production of radios. The company was known for its high quality of craftsmanship and was also producing cabinets for other radio manufacturers, including Philips (in 1930). Magnus Jørgensen died in 1932. Clemen and Magnus Jørgensen's younger brother, who was also a furniture-maker and had joined the company in 1927, then took over the position as head of the cabinet division.

The factory was expanded in 1937. It had 250 employees in 1943. Jørgensen designed and constructed a wind turbine which he placed on the factory roof. The wind turbine, which had a 10 kW maximum output, produced electricity for many years. It was his hope that manufacture of wind turbines would be a future source of income for the company but the prototype was never commercialized.

On 1 April 1952, it was sold to To-R, another Danish radio and television manufacturer.

== Clocks ==
During World War II, radio valves were unavailable in Denmark and Telavox therefore established a production of clocks on their factory in Vanløse. The first clocks were manufactured in 1942. Jørgensen used a bimetallic balance on his Telavox clock design to avoid temperature variations and hence make the clockworks more accurate than other clocks on the market at the time. From 1944 to 1952, Telavox manufactured a total of 150,000 clocks with ten different case designs and four types of movement. When Jørgensen sold the company in 1952, clock production was split off from radio manufacturing under the name Clementa.
