= 2021 Tårnby municipal election =

- 16 November 2021

All 19 seats to the Tårnby Municipal Council 10 seats needed for a majority
- Turnout: 20,879 (63.7%) ▼3.5pp
	First party	Second party	Third party
	A	V	C
Party	Social Democrats	Venstre	Conservatives
Last election	8 seats, 40.6%	3 seats, 13.4%	2 seats, 7.2%
Seats won	8	3	2
Seat change	0	0	0
Popular vote	8,138	2,894	1,942
Percentage	39.7%	14.1%	9.5%
Swing	▼0.9%	▲0.7%	▲2.3%
	Fourth party	Fifth party	Sixth party
	Ø	O	T
Party	Red–Green Alliance	Danish People's Party	Tårnby Listen
Last election	1 seat, 6.4%	3 seats, 16.2%	Did Not Stand
Seats won	1	1	1
Seat change	0	▼2	▲1
Popular vote	1,791	1,510	1,290
Percentage	8.7%	7.4%	6.3%
Swing	▲2.3%	▼8.8%	New
	Seventh party	Eighth party	Ninth party
	F	D	B
Party	Green Left	New Right	Social Liberals
Last election	1 seat, 5.6%	0 seats, 2.8%	1 seat, 3.8%
Seats won	1	1	1
Seat change	0	▲1	0
Popular vote	1,057	943	776
Percentage	5.2%	4.6%	3.8%
Swing	▼0.4%	▲1.8%	0.0%
Mayor before election
Allan Andersen
Social Democrats
Mayor after election
Allan Andersen
Social Democrats

Ever since 1970, the Social Democrats had held the mayor's position in Tårnby Municipality.

Following the 2017 election, Allan Andersen from the Social Democrats, had won his first term as mayor.

In this election, it would become the fourth election in a row where the Social Democrats won 8 seats, and they would once again become the largest party. They would eventually agree with the Green Left and the Red–Green Alliance, that Allan Andersen should continue for a second term, and this would mark the 14th term in a row with the Social Democrats holding the mayor's position.

== Electoral system ==
For elections to Danish municipalities, a number varying from 9 to 31 are chosen to be elected to the municipal council. The seats are then allocated using the D'Hondt method and a closed list proportional representation. Tårnby Municipality had 19 seats in 2021

Unlike in Danish General Elections, in elections to municipal councils, electoral alliances are allowed.

== Electoral alliances ==
=== Electoral Alliance 1 ===
Party		Political alignment
F	Green Left	Centre-left to Left-wing
Ø	Red–Green Alliance	Left-wing to Far-Left

=== Electoral Alliance 2 ===
Party		Political alignment
B	Social Liberals	Centre to Centre-left
C	Conservatives	Centre-right
D	New Right	Right-wing to Far-right
I	Liberal Alliance	Centre-right to Right-wing
O	Danish People's Party	Right-wing to Far-right
V	Venstre	Centre-right

== Results by polling station ==
T = Tårnby Listen

Division	A	B	C	D	F	I	O	T	V	Ø
Division	%	%	%	%	%	%	%	%	%	%
Vestamager	38.2	2.9	11.5	4.8	5.5	0.9	10.6	5.5	15.2	5.1
Pilegården	34.5	3.9	11.5	3.9	5.0	1.0	6.0	5.7	20.5	8.1
Tårnby	41.8	4.2	8.2	4.2	5.2	0.6	8.0	6.9	12.4	8.6
Korsvejen	41.5	4.7	8.8	4.9	5.7	0.7	5.3	6.4	11.9	10.1
Løjtegården	36.4	4.4	9.7	3.9	4.8	0.6	5.8	5.7	18.7	10.1
Kastrup	43.8	3.2	7.8	5.4	4.9	1.0	8.0	7.1	8.7	10.1

== Results ==
Party		Votes	%	+/-	Seats	+/-
Tårnby Municipality
A	Social Democrats	8,138	39.67	-0.98	8	0
V	Venstre	2,894	14.11	+0.69	3	0
C	Conservatives	1,942	9.47	+2.32	2	0
Ø	Red-Green Alliance	1,791	8.73	+2.34	1	0
O	Danish People's Party	1,510	7.36	-8.83	1	-2
T	Tårnby Listen	1,290	6.29	New	1	New
F	Green Left	1,057	5.15	-0.45	1	0
D	New Right	943	4.60	+1.75	1	+1
B	Social Liberals	776	3.78	-0.01	1	0
I	Liberal Alliance	171	0.83	-0.87	0	0
Total		20,512	100	N/A	19	N/A
Invalid votes		83	0.25	+0.09		
Blank votes		284	0.87	+0.21		
Turnout		20,879	63.66	-3.59		
Source: valg.dk
