= Ydre Østerbro =

District of Copenhagen, Denmark

Coordinates: 55.7200°N 12.5628°E

Ydre Østerbro (lit. English: Outer Østerbro) is an area in Copenhagen, Denmark. It is the part of the district of Østerbro located furthest from the City Centre. It lies on the northeast border of the municipality. It covers an area of 5.08 km^{2}, has a population of 35,937 and a population density of 7,081 per km^{2}.

Neighboring city districts are as follows:

- to the north is Gentofte municipality, which is outside of the Copenhagen municipality area
- to the west are Bispebjerg and Ydre Nørrebro
- to the south is Indre Østerbro
- to the east is Svanemølle Bay (Svanemøllebugten), an inlet of the Øresund, the strait which separates the island of Zealand from Sweden

Colloquially, the Ydre Østerbro ("Outer Østerbro"), along with its neighboring city district to the south— Indre Østerbro ("Inner Østerbro")— are often collectively referred to as "Østerbro". However, they are technically two separate legal units within the Copenhagen municipality.

== Attractions ==
- Lake Emdrup (Emdrup Sø)
