= Ydre Nørrebro =

Area in Copenhagen, Denmark

Coordinates: 55.7028°N 12.5483°E

Ydre Nørrebro (English: Outer Nørrebro) is an area in Copenhagen, Denmark. It is the part of the district of Nørrebro located furthest from the City Centre. It covers an area of 2.10 km², has a population of 41,497 and a population density of 19,733 per km², making it the most densely populated district in Copenhagen and all of Denmark. Approximately 25% of the inhabitants are immigrants, in some areas the immigrants population is 50%. Many shops are run by Middle Eastern and South Asian immigrants which gives the area a very multi-ethnic atmosphere.

Neighboring city districts are as follows:

- to the southeast are Indre Nørrebro and Indre Østerbro
- to the northeast is Ydre Østerbro
- to the northwest is Bispebjerg
- to the southwest is Frederiksberg municipality, which is not a part of Copenhagen municipality, but rather an enclave surrounded by the municipality

Colloquially, the Ydre Nørrebro and the Indre Nørrebro are commonly referred to as Nørrebro.
