= Indre By =

District in Central Copenhagen

Coordinates: 55.68°N 12.58°E

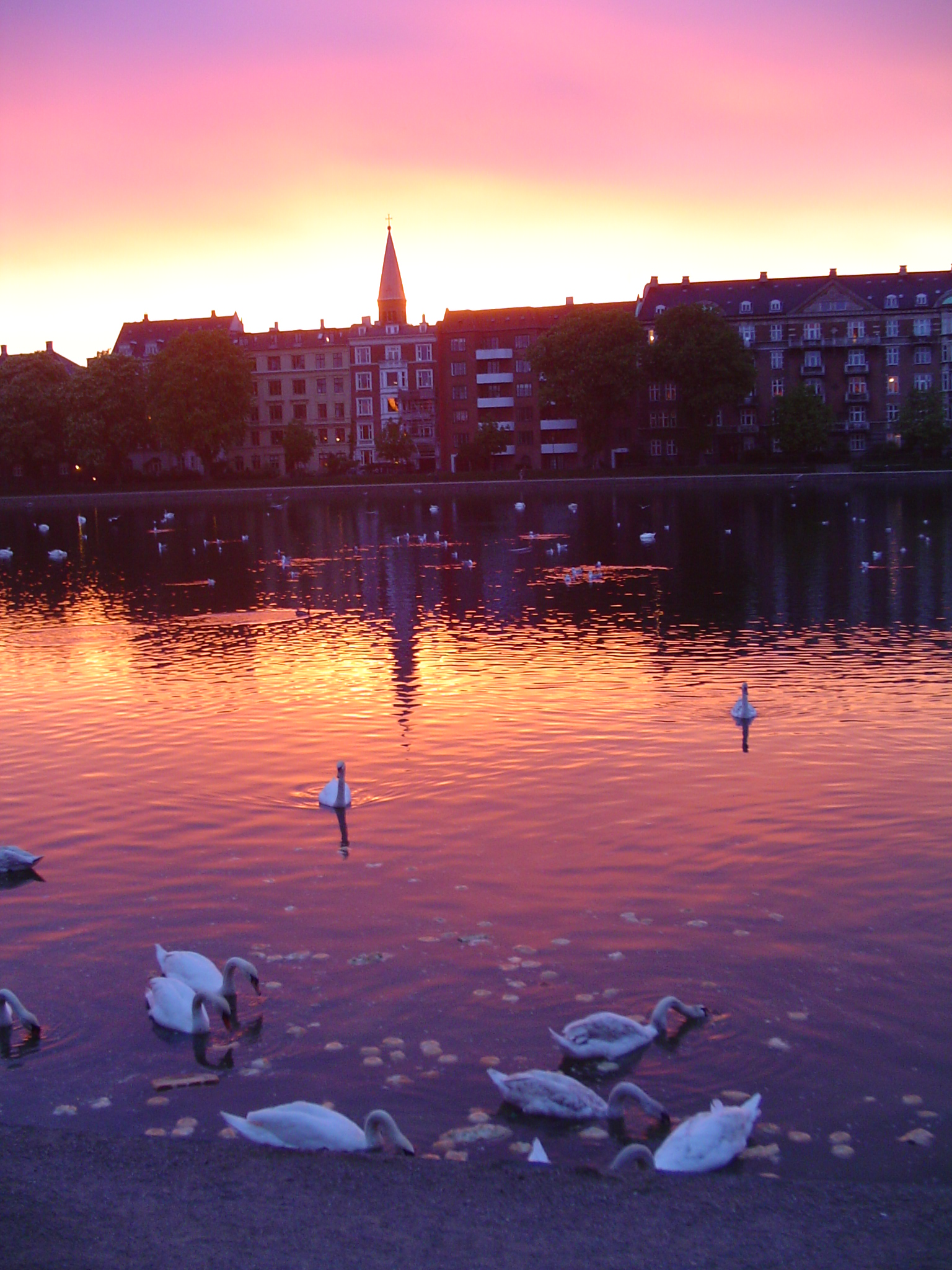
The "lakes" in central Copenhagen, Denmark.

Indre By (English: lit. 'Inner City'), also known as Copenhagen Center or K or Downtown Copenhagen, is an administrative district (bydel) in central Copenhagen, the capital of Denmark. It covers an area of 4.65 square kilometres (1.80 sq mi), has a population of 26,223, and a population density of 5,638 per km^{2}.

Neighboring city districts are as follows:

- to the east and south east is Christianshavn, separated from the Inner City by the Inner Harbour (Inderhavnen) and Copenhagen Harbour (Københavns Havn)
- to the north is Indre Østerbro
- to the west is Indre Nørrebro and Frederiksberg municipality, which is not a part of Copenhagen municipality but rather an enclave surrounded by the municipality, with both being separated from the Indre By along the "lakes" (Skt. Jørgens Lake, Peblinge Lake, and Sortedams Lake)
- to the southwest is Vesterbro
- to the south is Vestamager, separated from the Inner City by the South Harbour (Sydhavnen)

== The Indre By district ==
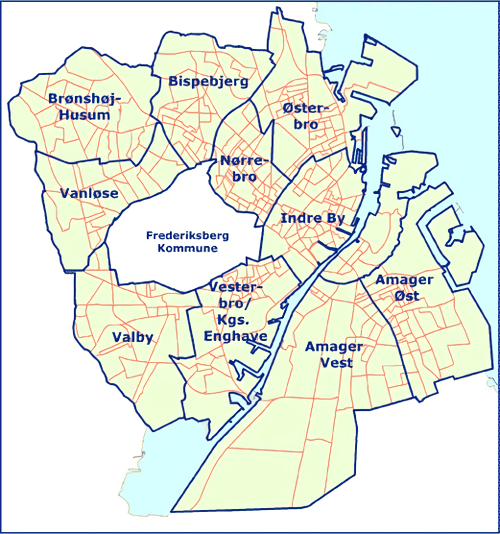
Map of the districts of Copenhagen municipality.

This district is the historic, geographic and political heart of present-day Copenhagen, and reflects the history of Denmark. Its boundaries pretty much reflect the entire city’s extent during the reign of King Christian IV (1588-1648).

At the time it was a fortified city and its borders were made of defensive walls with moats. To ensure water for the moats there was a series of dams.

Entry and exit to the city was through the town's four gates: Vesterport ("Western Gate") near the current Rådhuspladsen (City Hall Square), Nørreport ("Northern Gate") near the current Nørreport station, Østerport ("Eastern Gate") by the current Østerport station, and Amagerport ("Amager Gate", i.e. functionally the Southern Gate) between Christianshavn and the island of Amager. The gates were dismantled in 1856. The locations are now commemorated with milestones erected on the spot.

Additionally artificial lakes were constructed as part of Christian IV's large building project. These still exist to this day, and are simply referred to as the "lakes" (Skt. Jørgens Lake, Peblinge Lake, and Sortedams Lake). The area beyond the lakes, now heavily populated city districts, was then used primarily for grazing. It was prohibited to build beyond these original city limits so that the fortification’s cannons could have clear shot and so that the enemy could not find any hiding areas. The line that marked this "no build" zone was called the Demarcation Line (Demarkationslinien) The line was moved further out as the shooting range of canons improved, and was not abolished until after the cholera epidemic of 1853.

The fortification system was sold to Copenhagen municipality in 1869 and largely dismantled the year after. Evidence of the walls can be found in the street names outlining the central part of the city. From Kastellet at the northeast point of the district runs Øster Voldgade ("Eastern Wall Street") to the southwest. The street changes names near Nørreport Train Station and continues as Nørre Voldgade ("Northern Wall Street"). Vester Voldgade ("Western Wall Street") starts at Ørsteds Park and runs southeast until it reaches the water of Copenhagen Harbour (Københavns Havn). The fortification system continues on the other side of the water in the Christianshavn city district.

A ring of parks (fæstningsringen, English "fortification ring") has been erected outside where the walls once stood, and remnants of the bastions, ravelins and moats can be seen in Østre Anlæg park, the Botanical Gardens, Ørsted Park and Tivoli Gardens. In the central historic district of Copenhagen, eclectic architecture prevails.

This area features not only cultural landmarks but also numerous business premises, providing the opportunity to work and enjoy art simultaneously. Among such buildings are the neat and presentable building on Ny Kongensgade 15, built in 1880 by master carpenter P. Hansen and Bredgade 38 is a historic building built in 1801 by architect Andreas Gallander. Despite being carefully guarded, they still offer modern working spaces, allowing professionals to immerse themselves in a rich historical ambiance while conducting their daily business.

== History ==
Copenhagen was founded around year 1000 by Sweyn I Forkbeard and his son Canute the Great.

It was only a fishing village until the middle of the 12th century when Havn ("Harbour"), as the town was then called, assumed increasing importance in the Danish kingdom. Around 1160 King Waldemar the Great gave control of Copenhagen to Absalon, Bishop of Roskilde. Whereas other cities in the Danish realm were under the governance of the king, Havn or Købmannehavn (Merchants' Harbour) as it comes to be known, was given to the Bishop of Roskilde. Bishop Absalon built his fortified "Castle at Havn" in 1167 on a little island outside the harbour itself, the remains of which can still be seen under present day Christiansborg Palace. The castle stood 200 years.

The Catholic Church erected cathedrals in Roskilde (Roskilde Cathedral) and in Lund (Lund Cathedral), in what is now Sweden, which laid the basis for further development in those regional centres, and as Havn was midway between the two cities, it was centrally located for traffic and trading.

In the years that follow, the town grew tenfold in size. The excellent harbour encouraged Copenhagen's growth until it became an important centre of commerce (hence its name). Churches and abbeys were founded. Købmannehavn's economy blossomed due to the income from an enormous herring fishery trade, which provided large parts of Catholic Europe with salted herring for Lent.

In 1254, it received its charter as a city under Bishop Jakob Erlandsen.

Copenhagen was located at the most important approach to the Baltic Sea and the rich North German trading towns of the Hanseatic League, providing Copenhagen with power and wealth, but also threatening its very existence. It was repeatedly attacked by Wend pirates and the Hanseatic League.

Time and again the town was besieged and laid waste by the Hanseatic League. In 1369 they tore down the castle, but a new castle—Copenhagen Castle was built in its place. At the same time the Danish king was also attempting to take Copenhagen back from the bishop. The crown succeeded in 1416, when King Erik of Pomerania took control of the town. Thenceforth Copenhagen belonged to the Danish Crown.

Despite centuries of power struggles and warring the town grew increasingly rich. Copenhageners did a brisk trade with friend and foe alike. Foreign merchants came to the town. Craft guilds were established and the University of Copenhagen was founded.

By the time of Christian IV's coronation in 1596, Copenhagen had become rich and powerful. The new king decided to make the town the economic, military, religious, and cultural centre for the whole of the Nordic region. The king established the first trading companies with sole rights to trade with lands overseas. In order to restrict imports, factories were set up so that the country could manufacture as many goods as possible on its own.

Christian IV expanded Copenhagen by adding two new districts: Nyboder ("New Booths") for the large numbers of navy personnel and the merchants' new district and Christianshavn ("Christian's Harbour"), which is modelled after Amsterdam. A modern fortification with earthworks and bastions was built to surround the whole of the extended town. Gradually, however, it paralleled the town limits, and for the next 200 years or so traffic entering and leaving Copenhagen had to pass through Copenhagen's four narrow town gates.

Apart from the new earthworks, Christian IV commissioned German and Dutch architects and craftsmen to construct magnificent edifices designed to enhance his prestige. To this very day those buildings make their mark on the cityscape of Copenhagen.

By the time of Christian IV's death in 1648, Copenhagen had become Denmark's principal fortification and naval port, and the town formed a framework for the administration of the Danish kingdom and as a centre of trade in Northern Europe.

In the 1840s there was pressure placed on the military to dismantle the ring of fortifications in the inner city, and the military sold the land to Copenhagen municipality, which took ownership in October 1869. Dismantling began and discussions raged as to what to do with the land. Part of the land was used for parks and green areas.

Dismantling the fortifications and moving the capital area’s defenses further out from the city also allowed the city to expand, opening up the development of many of the other city districts in today’s Copenhagen.

== Attractions ==
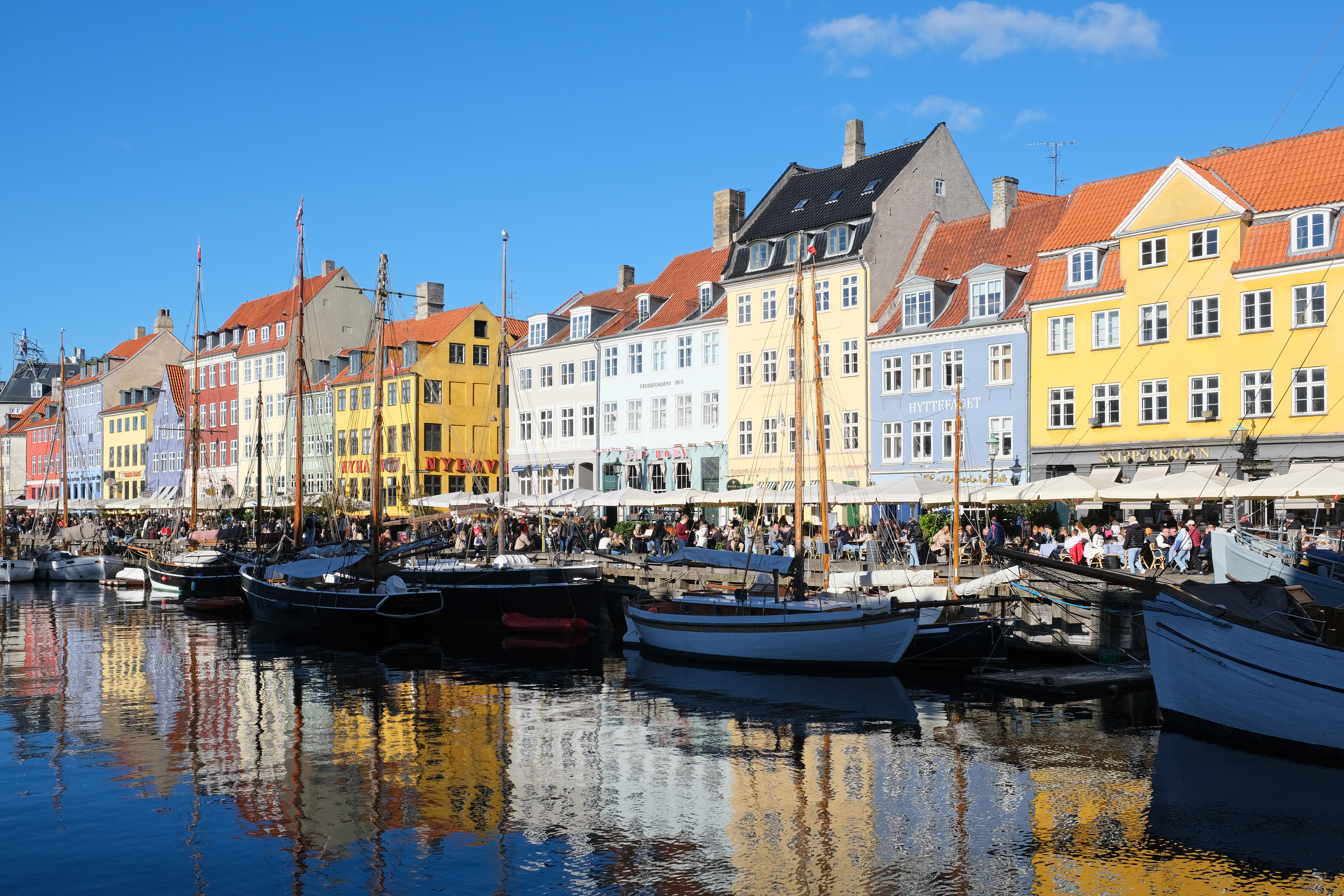
Nyhavn waterfront

- Amalienborg Palace
- Børsen, The Stock Exchange
- Christiansborg Palace located on Slotsholmen
- Copenhagen Botanical Garden
- Copenhagen City Hall (Rådhuset)
- Christiania
- Frederiksstaden
- Copenhagen Central Station (Hovedbanegård)
- Gefion Fountain
- The Hirschsprung Collection (Den Hirschsprungske samling)
- Kastellet
- Kongens Have ("The King's Park")
- National Art Museum (Statens Museum for Kunst)
- National Museum of Denmark
- Nyboder
- Nyhavn
- Rosenborg Castle
- Royal Danish Theatre
- Rundetårn, the Round Tower
- Strøget
- The Little Mermaid
- University of Copenhagen
- Østre Anlæg ("The Eastern Fortification") park
- Gråbrødretorv
- Gammel Strand
