= Indre Nørrebro =

District of Copenhagen, Denmark

Coordinates: 55.6903°N 12.5542°E

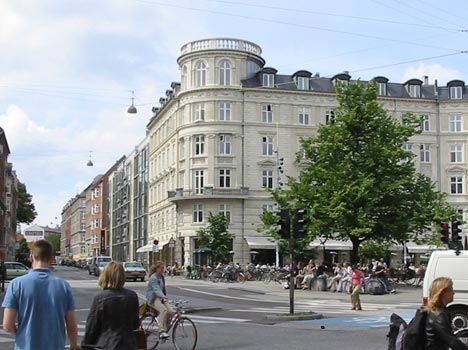
Sankt Hans Torv

Indre Nørrebro (lit. English, "Inner Nørrebro"), was one of the 15 administrative, statistical, and tax city districts (bydele) comprising the municipality of Copenhagen, Denmark. It covered an area of 1.72 km^{2}, had a population of 31,046 and a population density of 18,057 per km^{2}, making it the second most densely populated district in Copenhagen. Since 2007, the district has been part of the administrative district Nørrebro.

Neighboring city districts were as follows:

- to the southeast was the Indre By, also known as "Copenhagen Center" or "Downtown Copenhagen" or "City", separated from Indre Nørrebro by the "lakes" (Skt. Jørgens Lake, Peblinge Lake, and Sortedams Lake)
- to the northeast was Indre Østerbro
- to the northwest was Ydre Nørrebro
- to the southwest was Frederiksberg municipality, which is not a part of Copenhagen municipality but rather an enclave surrounded by the municipality

Colloquially, the Indre Nørrebro and the Ydre Nørrebro were collectively referred to as Nørrebro.

== Attractions ==
- Assistens Cemetery (Assistens Kirkegård)
- Blågårds Plads
- Nørrebro Street (Nørrebrogade)
