= Lene Beier =

Danish television presenter

- Born: Lene Ransborg; 29 May 1977 (age 49); Skive, Denmark
- Occupation: Television presenter
- Spouse: Anders Beier
- Presenting career
- Station: TV 2 Fri
- Previous shows: Frihuset; En stor dag på godset; Landmand søger kærlighed; Klar, Parat, Sy; Mit Frirum; Kurs mod fjerne kyster ekstra; Mit Livs Eventyr

Lene Beier (born Lene Ransborg; 29 May 1977 in Skive) is a Danish television presenter, who in 2014 was named "Star of Stars of the Year" by Billed Bladet's readers for the TV-GULD party. In 2016 she received the award as "The Women's Entertaining Host of the Year".

Lene Beier got her breakthrough on TV 2 Fri, where she was at Frihuset together with, among others, Cecilie Hother and Thomas Uhrskov from 5 May 2013 to 31 December 2014. Lene Beier has also hosted other programmes at TV2 such as En stor dag på godset and the dating programme Landmand søger kærlighed, but also Klar, Parat, Sy, Mit Frirum, Kurs mod fjerne kyster ekstra and Mit Livs Eventyr.

In June 2015, Lene Beier had been at the royal wedding between Prince Carl Philip of Sweden and Princess Sofia, together with her colleague Morten Ankerdal, and in 2016 she participated in the 13th edition of Vild med dans.
