= Brønshøj-Husum =

District of Copenhagen

Coordinates: 55.7075°N 12.4914°E

Brønshøj-Husum is one of the 10 official districts of Copenhagen Municipality, Denmark. The district is bisected by Frederikssundsvej and consists mainly of vast areas of single family detached homes. It lies on the northwest border of the municipality. It covers an area of 8.73 km^{2}, has a population of 39,588. The district, now a quiet suburban area, has developed around the two old villages of Brønshøj and Husum.

With 24.6% of the inhabitants having a non-Western background, Brønshøj-Husum is the most diverse district of Copenhagen.

== Geography ==
Brønshøj-Husum is bounded by Vanløse to the south, Bispebjerg to the east, Gladsaxe Municipality to the north, Herlev Municipality to the northwest and Rødovre Municipality to the west. The southern border follows Slotsherrensvej but the border is less well-defined on the other sides.

== Parks and open spaces ==
The largest greenspace is Utterslev Mose which straddles the border with Bispebjerg in the northwestern corner of the district. Kagsmose is located in the western part of Brønshøj and Krogebjergparken in its southwestern corner. The three greenspaces are linked by Vestvolden, a former defensive structure which now forms a green belt through the western suburbs of Copenhagen. Bellahøj is located in the southeastern corner of Brønshøj.

== Sport ==
Brønshøj Boldklub play at the Tingbjerg Idrætspark.
