= Bispebjerg =

- District
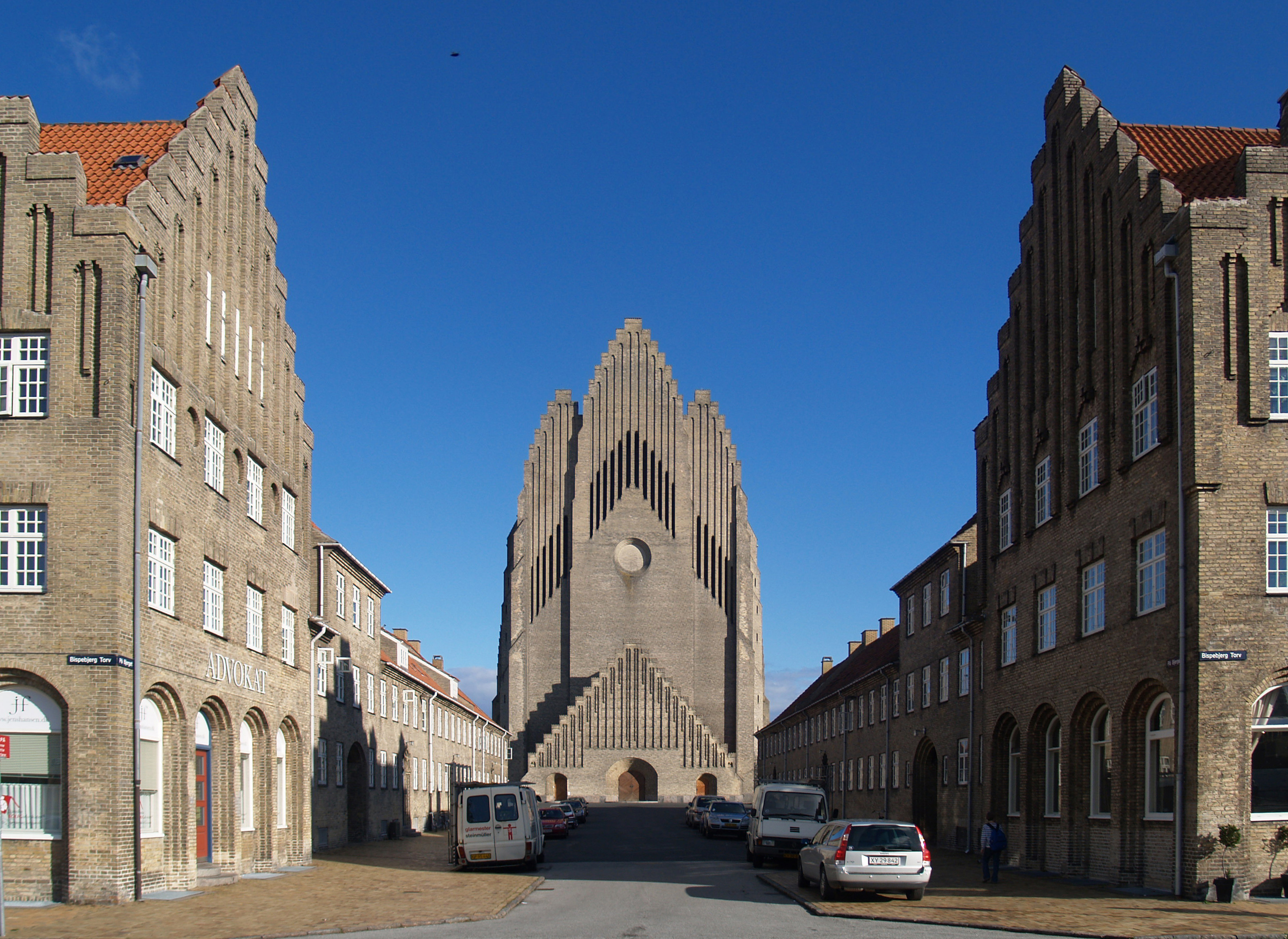
- Grundtvig's Church
- Interactive map of Bispebjerg
- Coordinates: 55°42′30″N 12°32′00″E
- Country: Denmark
- City: Copenhagen

Area
  - Metro: 5.39 km^{2} (2.08 sq mi)

Population (2014)
  - District: 40,033
- Time zone: UTC+1 (GMT)

Bispebjerg, more commonly referred to as Nordvest (English: "North-West"), is one of the 10 official districts of Copenhagen Municipality in the city of Copenhagen in Denmark. Located on the northern border of the municipality, it covers an area of 5.39 km^{2} and a population of 40,033. More specifically, Bispebjerg refers to a smaller neighbourhood within the district, located on the Bispebjerg Hill from which it takes its name.

== Geography ==
Bispebjerg covers an area of 5.39 km^{2} and has a population of 40,033, giving a population density of 7,389 per km^{2}. The district is bounded by Gentofte Municipality to the north, Østerbro and Nørrebro to the east and south-east, Frederiksberg to the south, Vanløse and Brønshøj-Husum to the west and Gladsaxe Municipality to the northwest.

== History ==
The name Bispebjerg is known from 1681 as Biszebierg. A windmill was built in the area in 1808. Bispebjerg belonged to the civil parish of Brønshøj but in the 1890s, the City of Copenhagen acquired large pieces of land in the area with the intention of establishing a cemetery and a hospital in the grounds. Bispebjerg was together with the rest of Brønshøj merged with Copenhagen in 1901. Bispebjerg Cemetery opened in 1903 and Bispebjerg Hospital was built between 1908 and 1913.

The district was generally built over with a combination of residential neighbourhoods and industry in the 1920s and 1930s. Grundtvig's Church was built between 1921 and 1940.

== See also ==
- Bispebjerg station
- Bispebjerg Hospital
