= Vanløse =

District of Copenhagen

Coordinates: 55°41′15″N 12°28′48″E

The districts of Copenhagen municipality: A: Indre By ("Copenhagen Center") B: Østerbro C: Nørrebro D: Bispebjerg E: Brønshøj-Husum F: Vanløse G: Valby H: Vesterbro/Kongens Enghave I: Amager Vest J: Amager Øst

Vanløse is one of the 10 official districts of Copenhagen Municipality, Denmark. It lies on the western border of the municipality. Vanløse covers an area of 6.69 km^{2}, and has a population of 36,115, making Vanløse the smallest district of Copenhagen, by population.

Neighboring city districts are:

- to the southeast is Frederiksberg municipality, which is not a part of Copenhagen municipality but rather an enclave surrounded by the municipality
- to the northeast is Bispebjerg
- to the north is Brønshøj-Husum
- to the west is Rødovre municipality, which is outside the Copenhagen municipality area
- to the south is Valby, partially separated by Damhus Lake (Damhus Sø).

== Government ==
It formerly had the head office of the Danish Aircraft Accident Investigation Board.

== Cultural references ==
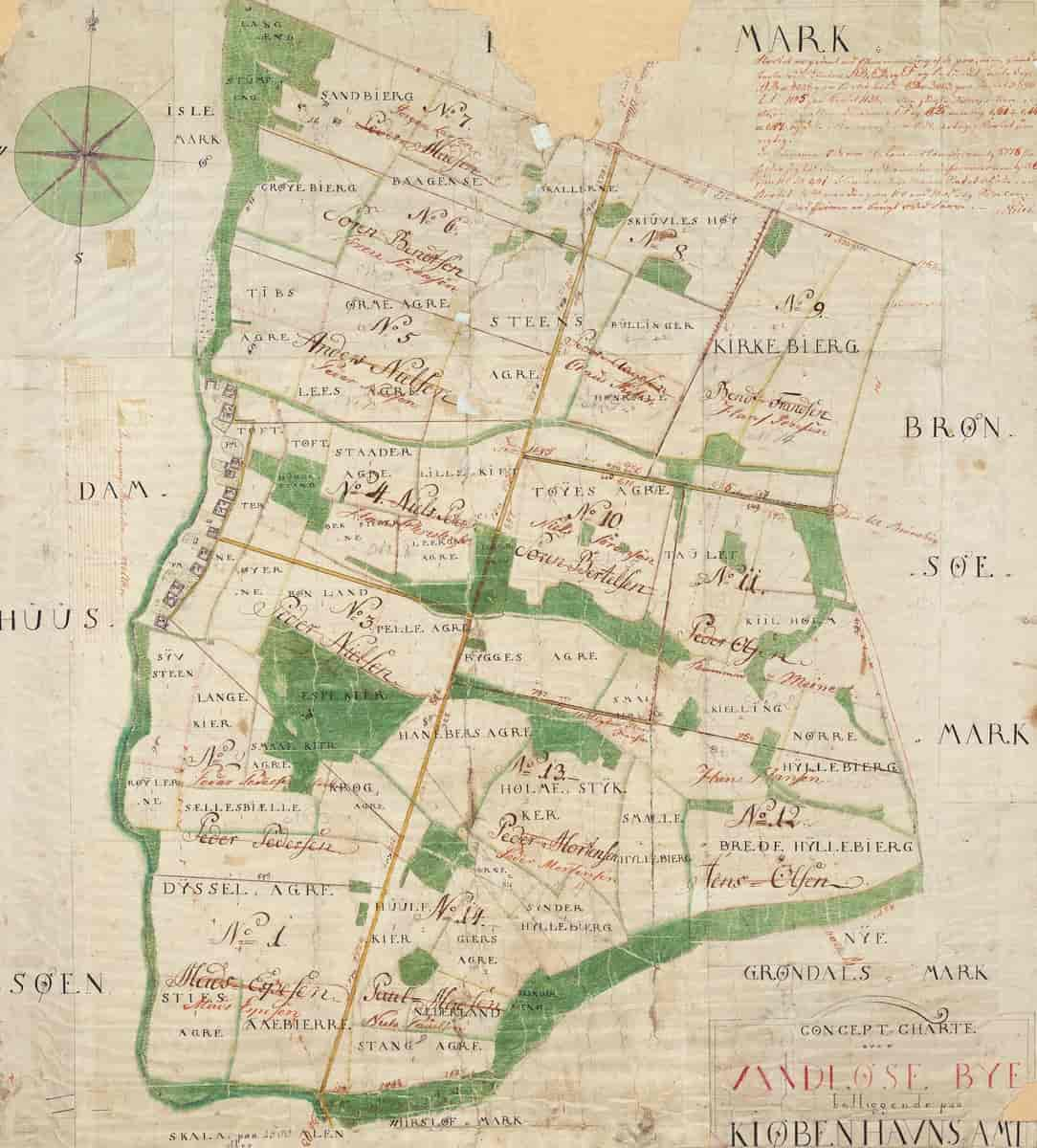
The oldest known map of Vanløse, 1719-

The French artist Paul Gauguin (1848–1903) lived at Bogholdergården in the street Bogholder Allé during his stay in Copenhagen in 1884–1885. Also, the Danish artist Henry Heerup (1907–1993) lived for many years in the street Rødtjørnevej in Vanløse. The local Hyltebjerg Church (Ålekistevej 89) is seen at 1:34:11 in the 1978 Olsen-banden film The Olsen Gang Sees Red.

Singer Van Morrison lived in Vanløse with his Danish girlfriend from 1980 until 1983. His song Vanlose Stairway deals with sitting on the stairs of the local station.

== See also ==
- Vanløse station
- Telavox
