= BumZen =

Far-left collective in Denmark

- BumZen Collective
- Kollektivet BumZen
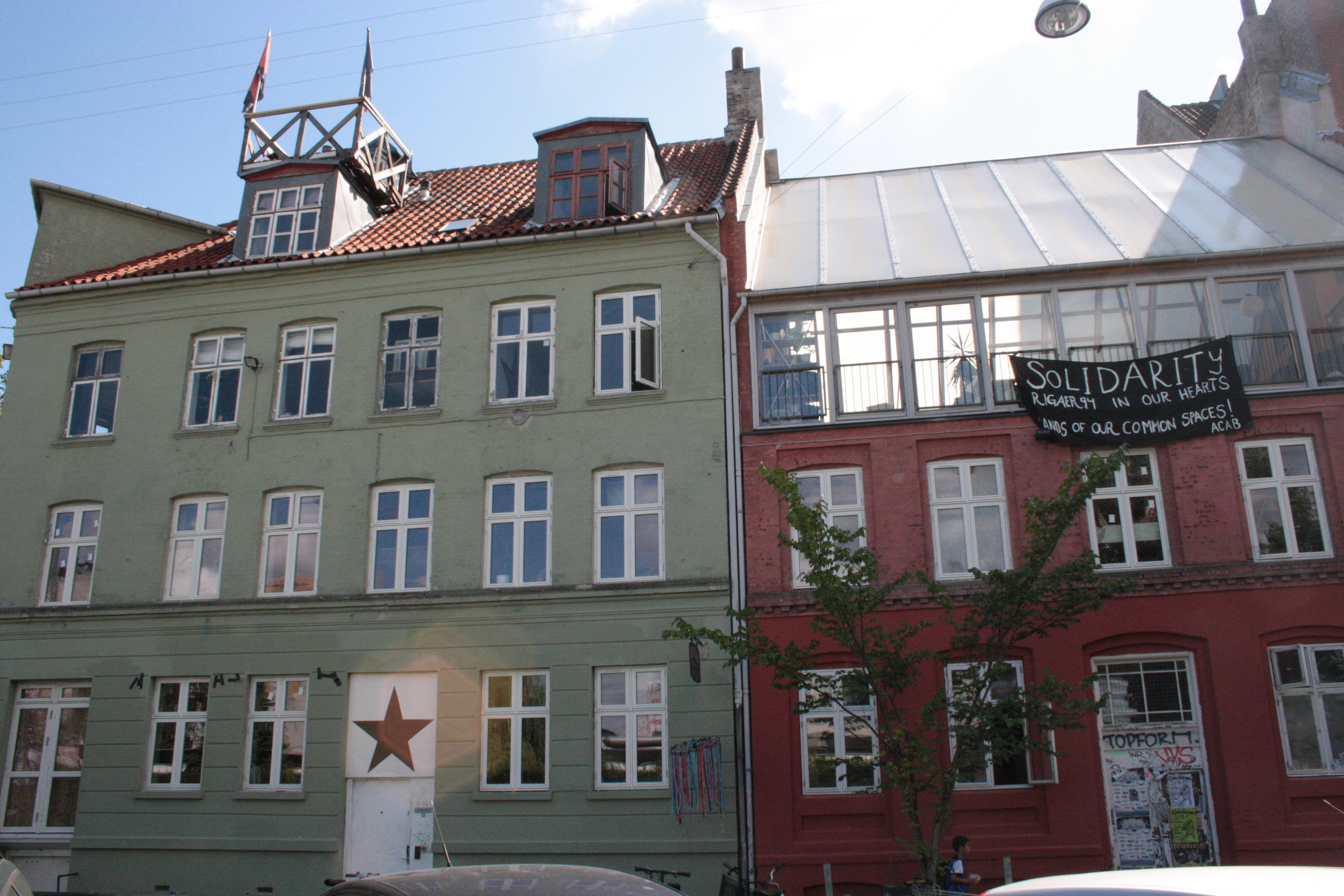
- BumZen Collective
- Formation: January 25, 1986; 40 years ago (informally)
- Type: Housing cooperative (andelsboligforening)
- Registration no.: CVR 33527888 (as A/B Baldersgade 20-22)
- Legal status: Association (forening)
- Headquarters: Baldersgade 20-22
- Location: Copenhagen, Denmark
- Coordinates: 55.69896°N 12.54473°E
- Field: Grassroots political activism (far-left politics, anti-fascism, anti-imperialism, anti-racism, anti-sexism, anti-capitalism)
- Funding: Member housing fees, private donations, private foundation grants, crowdfunding

BumZen Collective (Danish: Kollektivet BumZen) or simply BumZen is a far-left activist collective and self-managed social center established in 1986 in Nørrebro, Copenhagen, Denmark. It has become a notable gathering place for left-wing extremist groups in the country.

== History ==
=== Origins ===
BumZen grew out of Copenhagen's squatter movement (Danish: Bz-bevægelsen). The collective was informally established on 25 January 1986 when a group of squatters occupied two contiguous buildings in Baldersgade 20–22 in Nørrebro. The group legalized their presence three years later when they bought the buildings from their previous owner Arne Barnesen for around million Danish kroner (DKK), DKK 500,000 of which was donated through The Sky Blue Foundation (Himmelblå-Fonden), led by musician and former squatter Kim Larsen, and DKK 400,000 by Lise Plum, wife of far-left resistance fighter and politician from the Left Socialists Niels Munk Plum.

In the 1990s, Danish author and left-wing politician Pelle Dragsted lived in the BumZen Collective as a young revolutionary.

=== 2000s ===
In 2001, 25–30 police officers raided BumZen with police dogs after a man assaulted and held at gunpoint during a robbery identified the perpetrator as a member of the collective. During the raid, police did not find the perpetrator, but retrieved the air gun used in the robbery. The police also found several cobblestones, nine Molotov cocktails, 5-6 cold weapons in the form of iron bars, two snake guns, and a hot water storage tank believed to have been stolen from Amager, but did not arrest any of the present residents in connection with the search or the robbery.

In 2002, two BumZen residents were detained by the police for their suspected involvement in hashish trade as couriers. The police also searched the collective, finding a bomb factory in its basement, as well as eight thermite bombs. BumZen denied their collective involvement in the hashish trade and claimed the police search was motivated by Denmark's upcoming presidency of the Council of the European Union.

On 8 March 2003, BumZen hosted a screening of the film Frontiers of Dreams and Fears, debates on the situation in Palestine, a community kitchen and a party organized by the Women's Committee of Young Communist League of Denmark with proceeds going to the Palestinian Marxist–Leninist and revolutionary socialist organization Popular Front for the Liberation of Palestine designated a terrorist organization by the European Union. On 27 March 2003, BumZen hosted a debate by Communist Party of Denmark/Marxist–Leninists chairman Jørgen Petersen about the link between the Iraq War and the situation in North Korea and ways of supporting North Koreans.

In September 2007, 13 people from BumZen were arrested by the police, two of whom were charged with violence against a police officer, while the remaining 11 people were charged with violating the Executive Order on Public Order after they threw objects at a police patrol dispatched to the area following a report of graffiti vandalism. In October 2007, the collective was searched by the police in connection with the riots in March 2007 against the continued clearance of Ungdomshuset on Jagtvej 69. The police actions were criticised by the Workers' Communist Party.

=== 2010s ===
In 2015, 14 BumZen residents were arrested by the police and charged with serious disruption of public order in the Reclaim the Streets demonstration, during which cobblestones and Molotov cocktails were thrown at the police and the windows of Danish Police Museum, banks and several real estate agents were smashed. Residents of the collective believed the police had targeted them unjustifiably. The collective was also searched and the police found narcotics (skunk and Fantasy), cold weapons (such as nuts wrapped in gaffer tape, an iron chain, 11 wooden clubs with taped handles, 29 steel pipes, 7 knives (pocketknives, switchblades, fishing knives), machete), 8 pepper sprays, 5 gas masks and 4 flares.

In 2012, BumZen hosted a support party organised by the left-wing network Crisis Mirror to raise money for a Greek fund providing financial assistance to imprisoned Greek far-left militants and activists from Revolutionary Organization 17 November, Revolutionary Struggle and other Greek urban guerrilla groups. In 2016, two young men affiliated with BumZen were indicted for politically motivated vandalism carried out in 2014 against a building in Tordenskjoldsgade used by Folketing to house travelling politicians.

In 2017, 17 people in BumZen were arrested by the police and charged with violence against civil servants, serious violence, serious disruption of public order and vandalism during a demonstration marking the 10th anniversary of the demolition of Ungdomshuset, which escalated into riots in the evening. The police also searched the collective, finding around 100 gas masks, pepper spray, a caltrop and a throwing weapon. A building inspector from Copenhagen Municipality's Technical and Environmental Administration determined that building ground floor openings (windows and doors) barricaded with beams and shutters, items stored on the escape routes, main and fire stairs, and the fact fire doors between the two buildings on Baldersgade 20 and 22 could not be shut tightly constituted an "imminent danger" to the residents in the event of a fire. The owner of the building was ordered to rectify the dangerous conditions before next day at noon or the building would be evacuated and immediately closed off, which was done and the use of the building was approved again. Two years later, Copenhagen City Court ruled that 13 of the residents had been detained illegally and were entitled to a compensation.

In 2019, a resident of the collective was convicted of burning nine cars in the vicinity of BumZen, sentenced to a one-year unconditional imprisonment and ordered to pay one million DKK in damages. The day of the verdict, the convicted arsonist was released and returned to BumZen to await the start of his prison term. The collective and the perpetrator did not respond to requests for comment.
