= December riots =

December riots may refer to:

- Jeltoqsan, December 1986 riots in Almaty, Kazakhstan
- December 2001 riots in Argentina
- Copenhagen December riots, 2003
- 2005 Cronulla riots, Sydney, Australia
- Copenhagen December Riot, 2006
- 2008 Malmö mosque riots
- 2008 Greek riots
- 1 December 2013 Euromaidan riots
- December 2013 Stockholm riots
