= Public art in Nørrebro =

Nørrebro (one of the 10 official districts of Copenhagen), Denmark is an active community that nurtures an environment in which creativity is ever-present in daily life.

Both social and political Activism have been an intrinsic part of the artistic works produced on Nørrebro. In recent history, works with a temporary existence have dominated in Nørrebro. There are very few permanent public art sculptures and monuments.

== Selection of temporary works ==
- Sid Ned! The exhibition consists of six art projects: a local shuttle bus, ten benches, a hill, a video installation on the neighbors, a neon sign pointing us toward Mjølnerparken and a joint project undertaken by pupils and Café Heimdal, a local bodega.
- Picnic Hot Summer of Urban Farming Over the summer, 8 artists from Denmark and abroad have made temporary works, gardens and plantations in outer Nørrebro. The projects serve as starting points for exploring informal and temporary uses of spaces that are undetermined. link
- Plads til leg på Baldersgade af Tanja Rau She painted the playground walls, tables and large play castle in a harlequin pattern in many colors, so the kids get a more lively and inspiring place to play.

== Selection of permanent works ==
- Skulptur på Blågårds Plads, (1912–16) (Kai Nielsen)
- Artemisspringvandet (1934), Hans Tavsens Park af Johannes C. Bjerg og Poul Holsøe
- ”Unge Mennesker” (1942) ved Dr. Louises Bro (Johannes Hansen)
- Liggende figur, (1981) Sortedams Dosseringen, Søren Georg Jensen
- "De kantede bær’, de glatte glider" (1984) hj. af Nørrebrogade og Kapelvej (Jørgen Haugen Sørensen)
- Huset der Regner, (1993) på Skt. Hans Torv (Jørgen Haugen Sørensen).

== Activism in relation to public art on Nørrebro ==
Activism in Nørrebro covers a wide range: social, political, economic, religious and/or environmental. The working methods or forms used are very similar to those used by visual artists. They vary from non-confrontational persuading used by vegetarian activists, to boycotts, blockades, street marches or (in a few instances) "guerrilla" tactics used by anarchistic youth organisations, organised community groups and/or unorganised protesters.

=== Organisations ===
- Nørrebros Residents Action
- Firkantens Byggelegeplads
- Radio Finn 2000
- Ungdomshuset, Jagtvej 69
- BumZen On 25 January 1986 two contiguous houses on Baldersgade no. 20-22 were occupied. A collective was established and the house was named BumZen. It was legalized, a fund bought the house while the residents renovate it. It still operates as a Youth Collective.
