= Copenhagen December Riot =

The Copenhagen December Riot took place on 16 December 2006 in the Copenhagen area of Nørrebro. The spark of the riot was the longstanding conflict over the fate of the alternative left-wing social centre Ungdomshuset (The Youth House). The riot broke out when a Black Bloc demonstration in support of Ungdomshuset was blocked by the police. The riot was the worst of its kind in Copenhagen for at least 13 years and marked a low point in the negotiations between the authorities and the users of Ungdomshuset.

The riot is generally seen as the prelude to the much larger Copenhagen March Riot in 2007, which followed the eviction of Ungdomshuset on 1 March 2007.

== Background ==
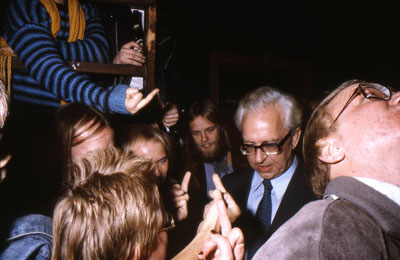
Mayor of Copenhagen Egon Weidekamp being "welcomed" by the users of the house when trying to visit the opening in 1982.

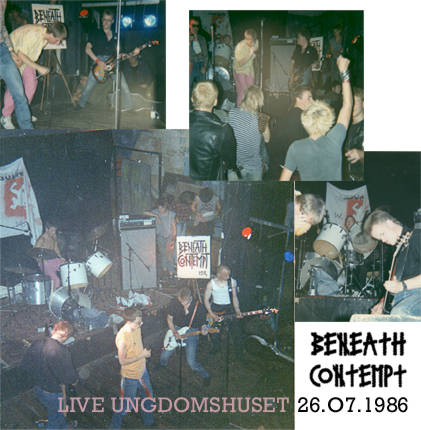
Ungdomshuset soon became a centre for alternative music.

In 1999, Ungdomshuset was put up for sale by the Copenhagen City Council. The house had originally been "given" to the city's community of squatters back in 1982 after the squatters had campaigned for an autonomous youth centre in Copenhagen. The agreement between the squatters and the city council was that the city authorities still officially owned the building but that the users of Ungdomshuset would be free to run the place as they saw fit, without interference from those authorities. Basic things such as paying rent still had to be meet by the users but otherwise the house would be completely autonomous and self-organized. The house soon became a gathering place for the city punk and alternative music scene and also became home to many political action groups as well as an underground performance scene.

Through the 1980s, conflict between the users and the city officials flared up. The users complained that about the city officials not keeping to their part of the agreement by demanding that the house live up to all kind of standards set by the city council. The city officials claimed that the users had no right to interfere with their work and said that Ungdomshuset had to live up to the standards set by the city council regarding public meeting places and daytime projects. The users replied by refusing to pay rent and retaliated by stating that Ungdomshuset was an autonomous social experiment and not a publicly run youth club or kindergarten. This made the city officials shut of the house supply of oil used for central heating. The users managed by installing wood fueled heating ovens in the major rooms of the house.

The tensions between the two sides increased through the 1980s and 1990s as the house developed into a centre for radical left-wing activities. The users of the house also became a thorn in the eye of the police as the users often were involved in clashes with these during demonstrations, evictions of squatted houses, etc. In 1987, the police mounted a raid on Ungdomshuset equipped with machine guns. The raid led to six arrests but since the police did not find anything illegal in the house they all were released without charges.

In 1996, Ungdomshuset was ravaged by fire destroying much of the interior. The city council used this opportunity as an excuse for closing down the house claiming that the building were no longer fit for human use. But the users were not going to let that happen. They started renovating the house themselves and after six months the house was reopened for the public. The city counsel protested about this but after the city building inspectors had inspected the house they found the house in an even better state of repair than before the fire. The city counsel then had to withdraw their protest.

== Sale and legal proceedings ==
In 1999, Ungdomshuset was put up for sale by the city council. This sparked an outcry of protest from the users. The users saw it as breaking the existing agreement and the sale was taken to the courts. This would be the beginning of a legal conflict that would go on for the eight years. In 2001, the company Human A/S bought Ungdomshuset for the price of two million Danish crowns. The company was owned by the right-wing Christian sect called Faderhuset ("The Father House") who clearly stated that they wanted the users of Ungdomshuset out of the building.

In 2004, the city-court of Copenhagen decided that the city counsel had the right to sell the house. This caused anger amongst the users who claimed that the sale were a violation of the 1982-agreement and that they by law had the rights to use the house. The decision was appealed to the national-court, but in August 2006 the court approved the decision made by the city-court. The decision by the national court triggered a number of reactions including an attack on the Copenhagen city-court with paint bombs. The decision also spark a massive mobilization for a campaign in defense of Ungdomshuset. The users tried to appeal to the Supreme court, but their request was denied.

== Campaign in defense of the house ==
Following the decision of the national court a campaign in defense of the house was started. The campaign had been going on ever since the house was sold, but it was only now when facing eviction that the campaign got organized and began focusing on mass-mobilization. As the campaign got more and more attention in the media, the number of people started attending demonstrations in support of the house rapidly increased. The demonstrations grew from a couple of hundred people to numbering several thousands in just a few months. For the first time in its history, Ungdomshuset experienced massive support from people outside radical left-wing circles. Much of this support came from young people, some of whom had never even visited the house before. Many of these young people was later going to form the main bulk of protesters in the subsequent riots.

Ungdomshuset soon began holding a number of meetings concerning the defense of the house, some of which were attended by up to a thousand people. The users began to make it clear that they were not going to give up the house without a fight. The consensus within the broad specter of supporters slowly, but surely started to change from non-violent protest to a felling that if violence was the only way to defend the house "then so be it". This radical shift in the movement was caused by a number of things. First of all the conflict had turned into deadlock. The users of the house made a compromise offer to the city council, that if they would present the young people with a new house, they would peacefully leave Ungdomshuset. The only demand was that the new house was the same size as Ungdomshuset. The city council blankly refused that offer.

At the same time, a foundation had been created to try to buy back the house from Faderhuset. This also failed. Faderhuset was offered 13 million, all the money the foundation could muster, but in spite of this being over six times the money that Faderhuset had bought the house for, they still refused to sell. At the same time, the users of the house experienced a wave of repression from the police. The police had frequently begun to attack Ungdomshusets demonstrations and a lot of people fighting for Ungdomshuset experienced massive harassment on a day-to-day basis.

People started to feel that the police were taking sides with the city council and Faderhuset. Tensions boiled over when a demonstration on 24 September was attacked by the police. The reason for the police attack apparently was a bottle being thrown at a police van. The police responded with a full frontal baton-charge on the demonstration. This led to several hours of street fighting between police and demonstrators. During the street fighting, three hundred people were arrested, many of which had not been involved with the fighting. A lot of these later claimed to have been brutally treated while in police custody. This sparked anger amongst the supporters of Ungdomshuset and many stated that violent resistance was now not only necessary and justified but the only right course of action that they could choose.

In November 2006, a demonstration outside Faderhusets headquarters was surrounded by the police. The demonstration was small and did not try to resist against the police. The police then started to beat the demonstrators, a lot of which were sitting down at the time. One demonstrator later had to be taken to hospital. This sparked a public outcry and deepened the anger the users already felt towards the police. This anger combined with the city councils refusal to negotiate and Faderhusets apparent "crusade" against Ungdomshuset would later lead to the riot in December 2006.

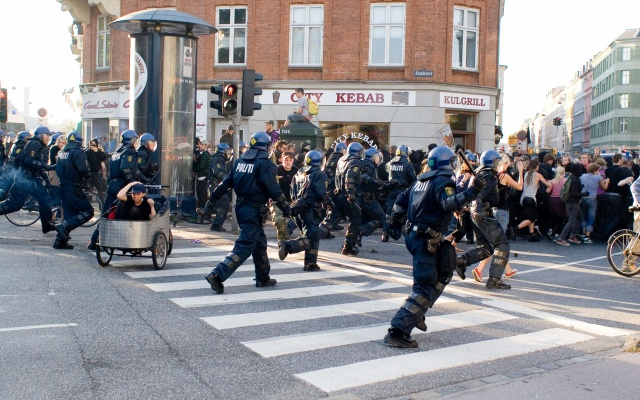
Police baton-charging the demonstration on September 24

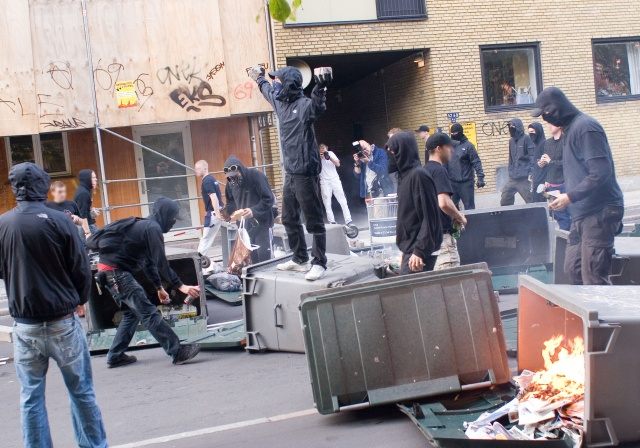
Protesters getting ready to confront the police on September 24

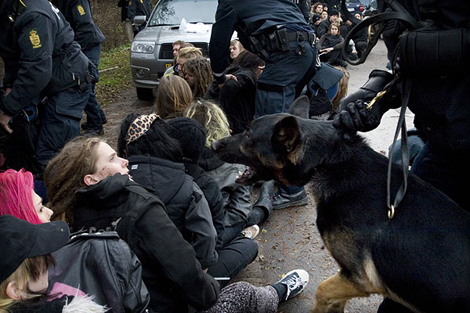
Protesters sitting down during a demonstration

== 16 December 2006 demonstration ==
After the appeal made to the supreme court was rejected an ultimatum was set for the users of Ungdomshuset. The ultimatum stated that the users had until 14 December 2006 to leave the house. If not the police would be called in to evict the house by force. A peaceful solution to the conflict now seemed to be impossible. The users of Ungdomshuset started to mobilize for a physical defense of the house. In December they called for three days of actions and demonstrations starting on 14 December. These included a demonstration on 16 December.

At the same time, a communique was sent out to supporters from the rest of Europe calling on them to come to Copenhagen and help defend the house. The communique was called "Troublemakers of the world unite!". Ungdomshuset had experienced a lot of foreign support from squatters and left wing radicals across Europe, and a lot of those now prepared to come to Copenhagen to participate in the demonstration. The demonstration was meant to mark the end of the three days of action. The day before on 15 December, thousands of people had marched peacefully through downtown Copenhagen and the protests had been peaceful up until then.

Late in the afternoon on 16 December people started to gather at Ungdomshuset. The police were patrolling heavily in the area and vans of riot police had been spotted in the streets around Ungdomsuset. At about 5:00 pm, around 1,200 demonstrators had gathered at Ungdomshuset. The demonstrators were all wearing black clothes and most of them had masked their faces with balaclavas or bandannas and hoods. The front block of the demonstration were also wearing crash-helmets and were armed with clubs, iron bars and homemade shields.

At about 5.30 pm, the demonstration started to move down Jagtvej towards the neighborhood of Frederiksberg. The demonstration had only moved about 300 meters when the police moved in and blocked it. The police surrounded the demonstrators with armoured cars. Loudspeakers then declared the demonstration illegal and ordered the demonstrators to disperse. The demonstrators responded by bombarding the police with fireworks, cobblestones, and bottles filled with paint. The police used armoured cars to split the main body of demonstrators into smaller groups. The demonstrators then moved downtown and vandalized a number of shops. The police used tear gas to disperse the demonstrators. By the end of the day the police had arrested 300 demonstrators.

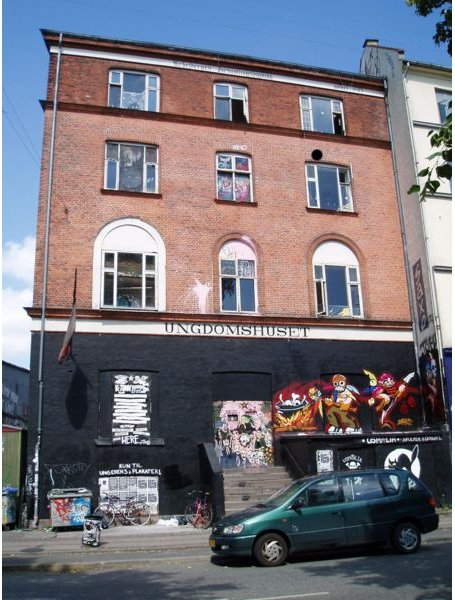
Ungdomshuset seen from the street

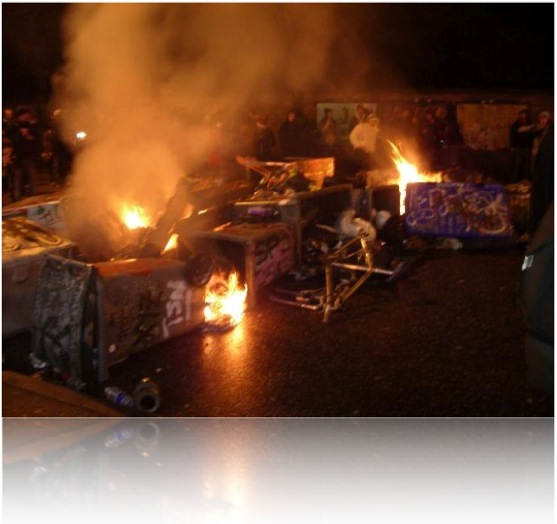
Burning barricade build during the riot

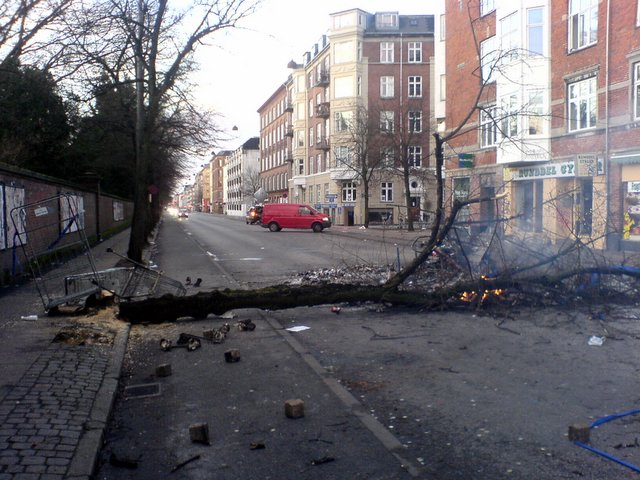
Tree used as a roadblock

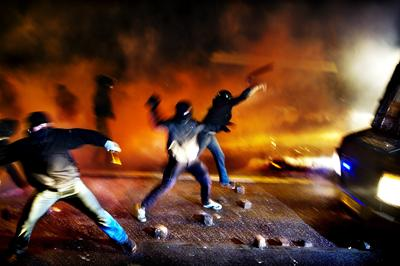
At one point the riot turned into a pitched battle between protesters and police
