= Ruth Kristiansen =

- Born: 1951 (age 74–75)
- Other names: Ruth Evensen
- Occupations: Religious leader, entrepreneur, politician
- Known for: Founder of Faderhuset; Purchase of Ungdomshuset
- Spouse: Lars Kristiansen

Leader of the Freedom Party
- In office 7 July 2007 – 2015
- Preceded by: Position established
- Succeeded by: Party disbanded

Ruth Kristiansen (formerly Ruth Evensen, born 1951) was the co-founder and leader of the now defunct Christian free church and cult Faderhuset which became widely known for its controversial purchase of Ungdomshuset in Copenhagen.

Ruth Kristiansen does not hold a degree in theology. Besides her leadership role in Faderhuset, she has been self-employed and has owned a hair salon and a cleaning company as well as functioning as a consultant.

On 7 July 2007 Ruth Kristiansen announced the founding of a new political party, the Freedom Party (Danish: Frihedspartiet). One of the party's core policies was an opposition to free abortion, and the party announced its creation on the day that the Danish Christian Democratic Party announced that it no longer opposed free abortion. In 2012, the party changed its name to Frihedskæmperne ("The Freedom Fighters"). After the national elections of 2015, the party disbanded.

In 2015, Ruth Kristiansen and her husband, Lars Kristiansen, launched the YouTube channel Ruth TV.
