= Xiquets Copenhagen =

Human tower group

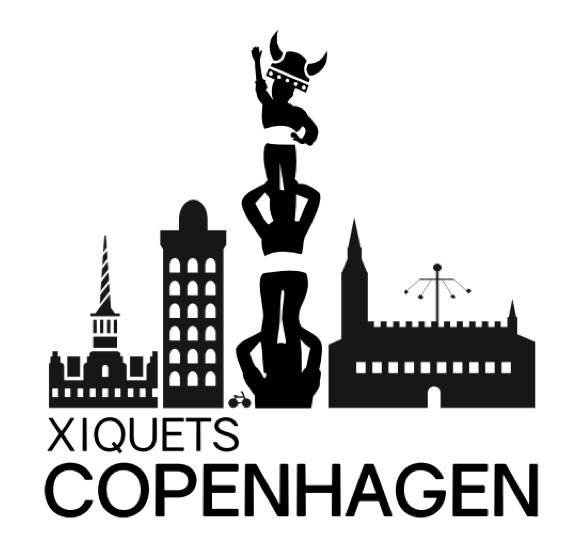
- Foundation: 2014
- Shirt color: Navy Blue
- Location: Copenhagen, Denmark
- Premises: Nørrebro Park Skole
- Group leader: Sergi Gibaja Musachs (since November 2021)
- President: Laia Poqui Sallés (since December 2022)
- Best towers: 2d6, 5d6, 4d6a, 3d6a, 3d6, 4d6, pd4
- Best performance: Xiquets' 10th anniversary (June 2024)
- Facebook: Xiquets Copenhagen on Facebook
- Instagram: Xiquets Copenhagen on Instagram
- Twitter: https://x.com/XiquetsCPH

Xiquets Copenhagen is an international colla castellera in Copenhagen, Denmark with an interest in building and promoting human towers (castells), a tradition originating in Catalonia and recognised as a UNESCO Masterpieces of the Oral and Intangible Heritage of Humanity. The team's identifying color is navy blue, and it consists of more than 70 members from more than 10 nationalities.

== History ==
Xiquets Copenhagen was officially founded in 2014 by Søren Sandahl, a dane who had been a casteller member in the Arreplegats de la Zona Universitària team during a stay in Catalonia. When he returned to Denmark, he suggested the creation of a group at the Catalan Cultural Center of Copenhagen (CatalansDK). The group was established as a multicultural organization with the goal of promoting the tradition of human towers in Denmark by holding open rehearsals and organizing public performances. Currently, rehearsals take place in Nørrebro, at Nørrebro Park Skole's gym, every Sunday from 14:30 to 17:00.

The trainings and social activities of Xiquets Copenhagen were paused during the Covid pandemic. However, the team has since seen a huge growth in number of members and quality of the constructions, achieving several castells of 6 levels on a yearly basis.

In 2022, Xiquets Copenhagen and Capgrossos de Mataró, one of the biggest teams in Catalonia, built official ties between the teams, with the latter becoming Xiquets' godfathers. The relationship has since flourished, with Capgrossos helping Xiquets with technical tips, equipment and social events, and even shared performances with mutual help in the construction of the respective castells.

== Main performances ==
Since its formation, Xiquets Copenhagen have participated in several diades (human towers performances). During these diades, Xiquets often perform together with other international colles and the mentioned Capgrossos de Mataró.

=== Early years (2014–2017) ===
During the first years of Xiquets, the team performed in several events and diades, regularly building castells of five levels and their first pillars of 4. Their two main performances those years were the II International Day in Tarragona in 2016 and the II International Human Towers Festival in Paris, in 2017.

Date	Event
31 July 2014	Helsingør Festival, with Xiquets de l’Alster and Castellers de Sants
13 June 2015	Gårdfest
24 April 2016	Sant Jordi at Borough Market, with Castellers of London
1 October 2016	II International Day (as part of the XVII Human Tower Festival of Tarragona)
3 June 2017	II International Human Tower Festival in Paris
30 August 2017	Inauguration of the Catalan Government Delegation in Denmark and in the Nordic countries
25-28 April 2019	32nd Aplec Internacional of Adifolk in Copenhagen, with Xiquets de Tarragona (during the 48 Timer Festival of Nørrebro)

=== The first castells of 6 (2018–present) ===
- October 2018, Tarragona:

The team signed its best performance to that date during the II International Day (as a part of the XXVII Human Tower Festival of Tarragona). Xiquets built its first castle of 6 levels ever, a 3d6* that had previously been unsuccessful.

*Can be read as three of six (tres de sis in Catalan) i.e. 3 people per level, 6 levels high.

- June 2019, Copenhagen:

First 4d6, second 3d6 and a fan of 4 during the III International Human Towers Festival in the Rosenborg Castle Gardens. First time the colla built two castells of 6 in the same diada.

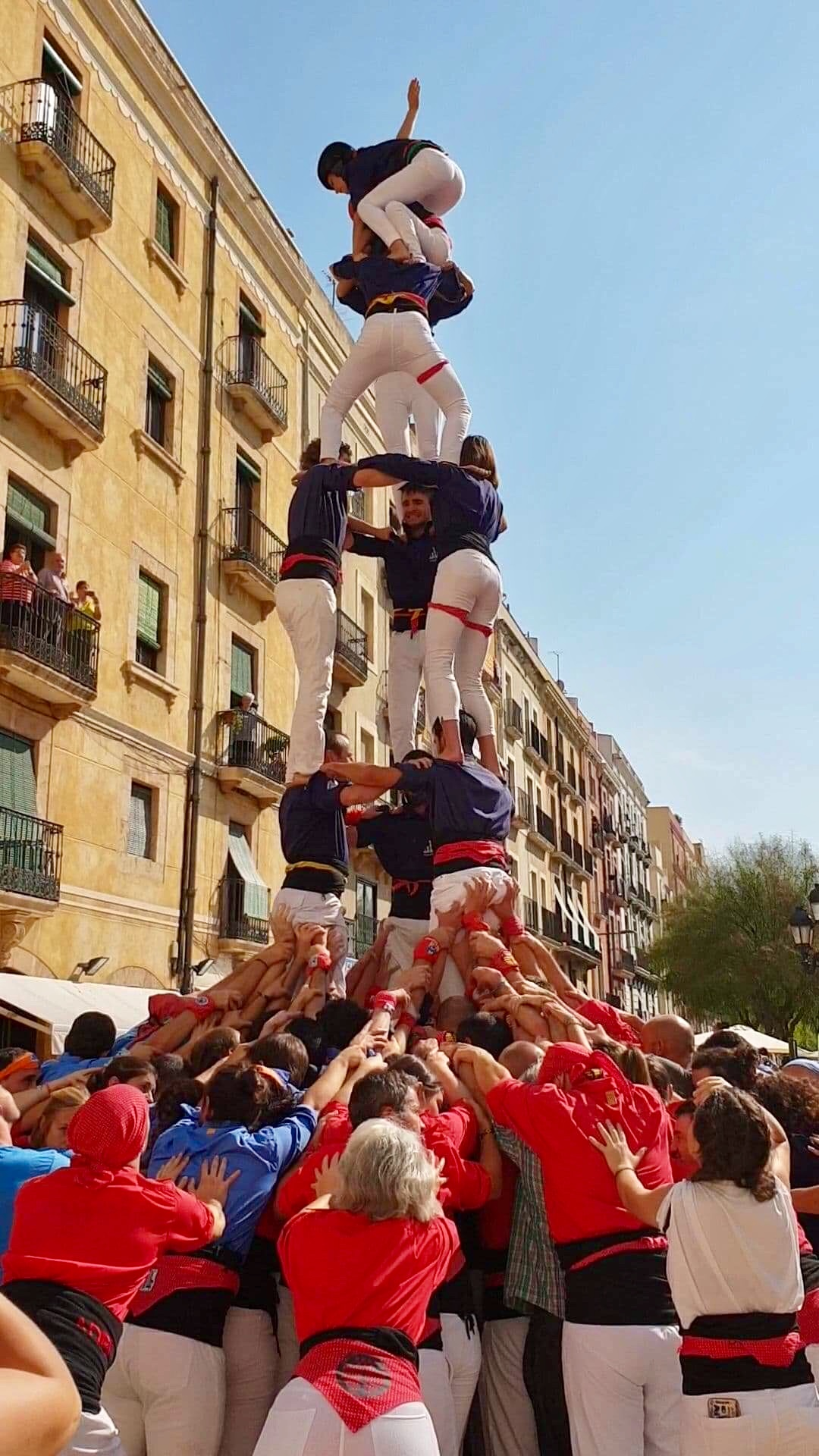
Xiquet's first ever 3of6

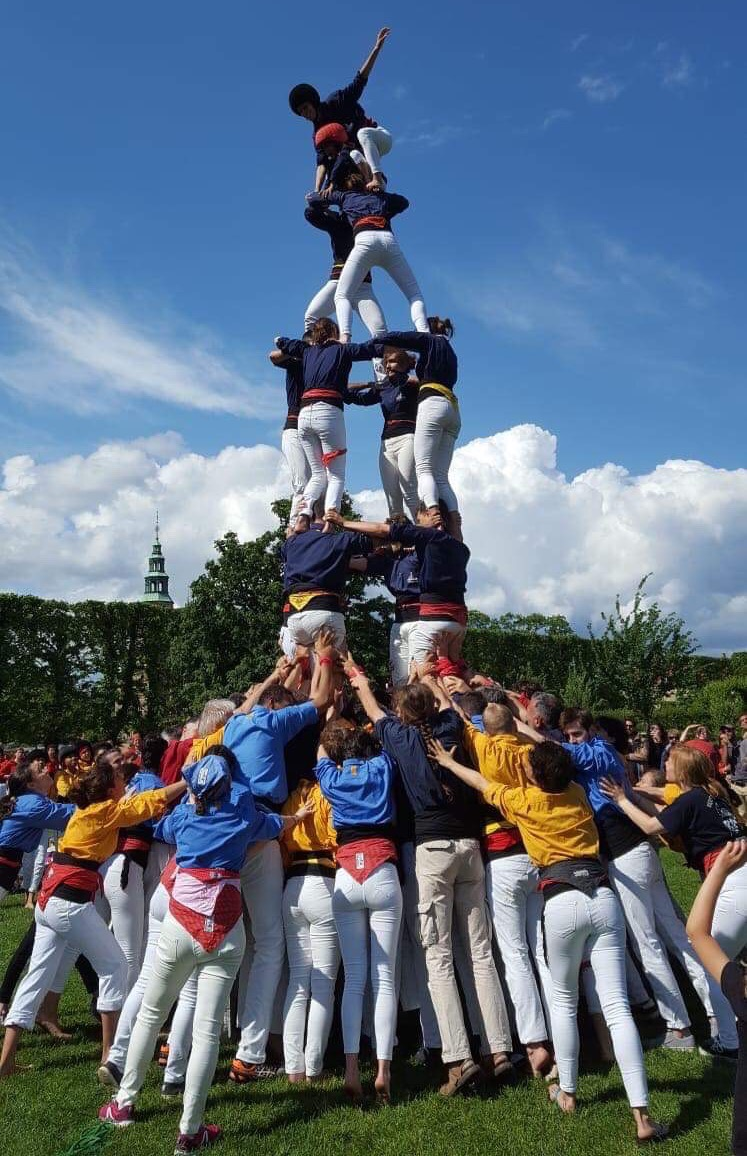
Xiquet's first ever 4of6

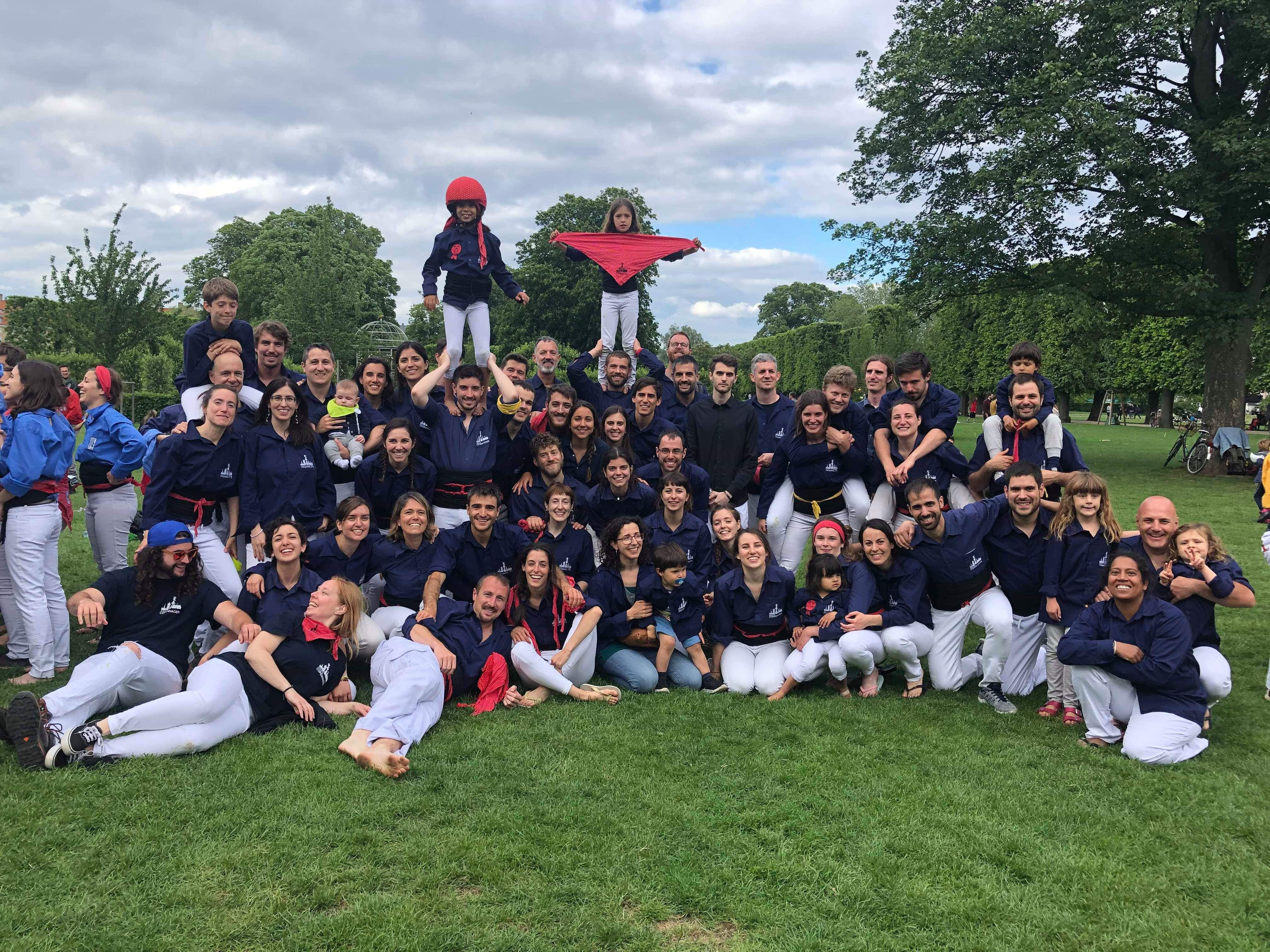
Team picture in Copenhagen in June 2019
- October 2022, Tarragona:

Second 4d6 of the colla during the XXVIII Human Tower Competition of Tarragona. First performance after the pandemic.

Castells: id3d6, id3d6, id4d6, 4d6, pd4

- June 2023, Copenhagen:

First 4d6a and first time the colla achieved three castells of 6 on the same day, during the IV International Human Towers Festival, held in Copenhagen.

Castells: 3d6, 4d6, 4d6a, 2xpd4

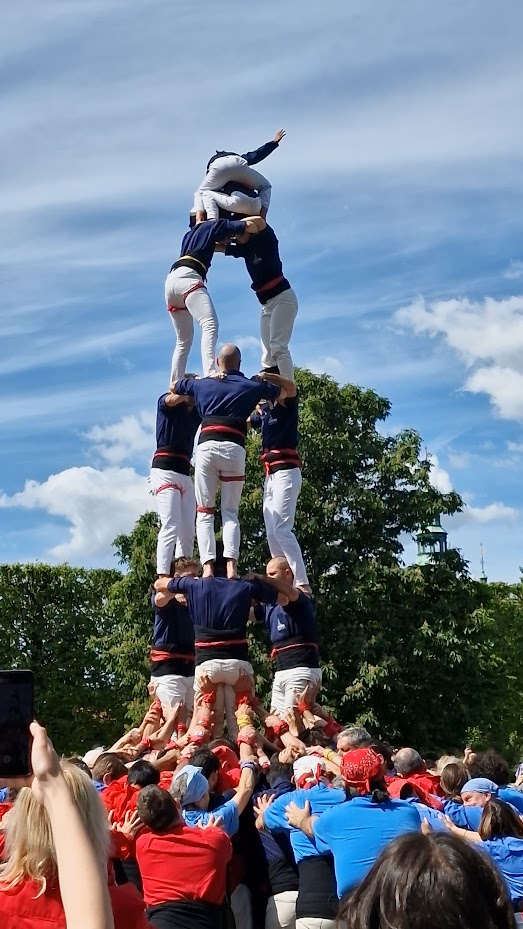
3d6

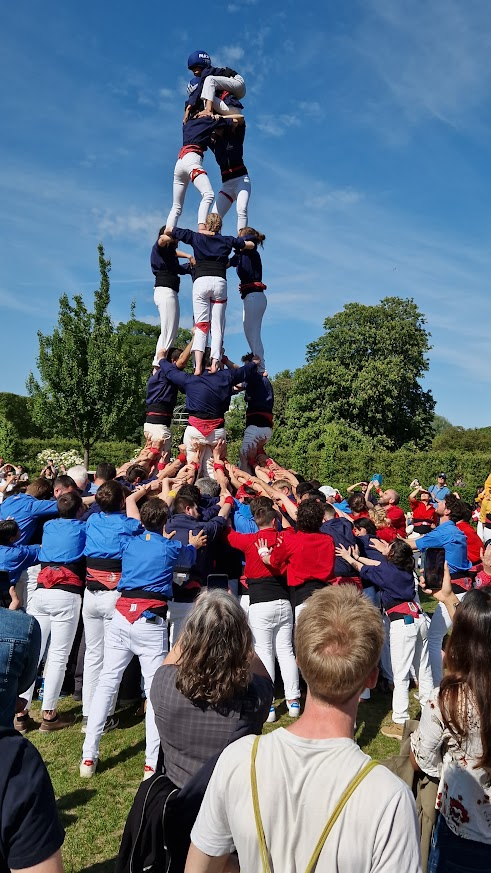
4d6

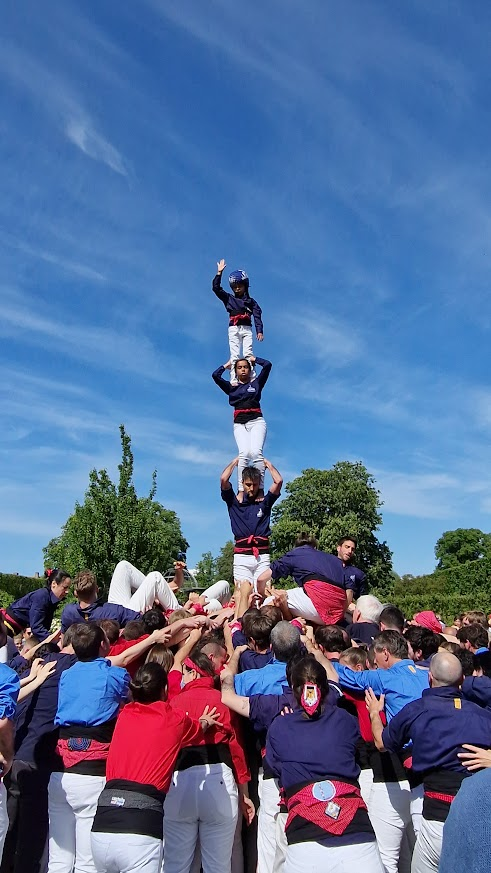
The team's first ever 4d6a. Picture of the pillar inside the 4d6
- October 2023, Mataró:

First joint performance with the godfather colla, Capgrossos de Mataró at the Diada de Sant Simó.

Castells: id3d6, id3d6, 4d6, 3d6, pd4.

- June 2024, Copenhagen:

Best performance in the colla's history to date in celebration of the colla's 10th anniversary. First 5d6 and second 4d6a, along with the 3d6.

Castells: pd4, 3d6, 4d6a, id5d6, 5d6, pd4

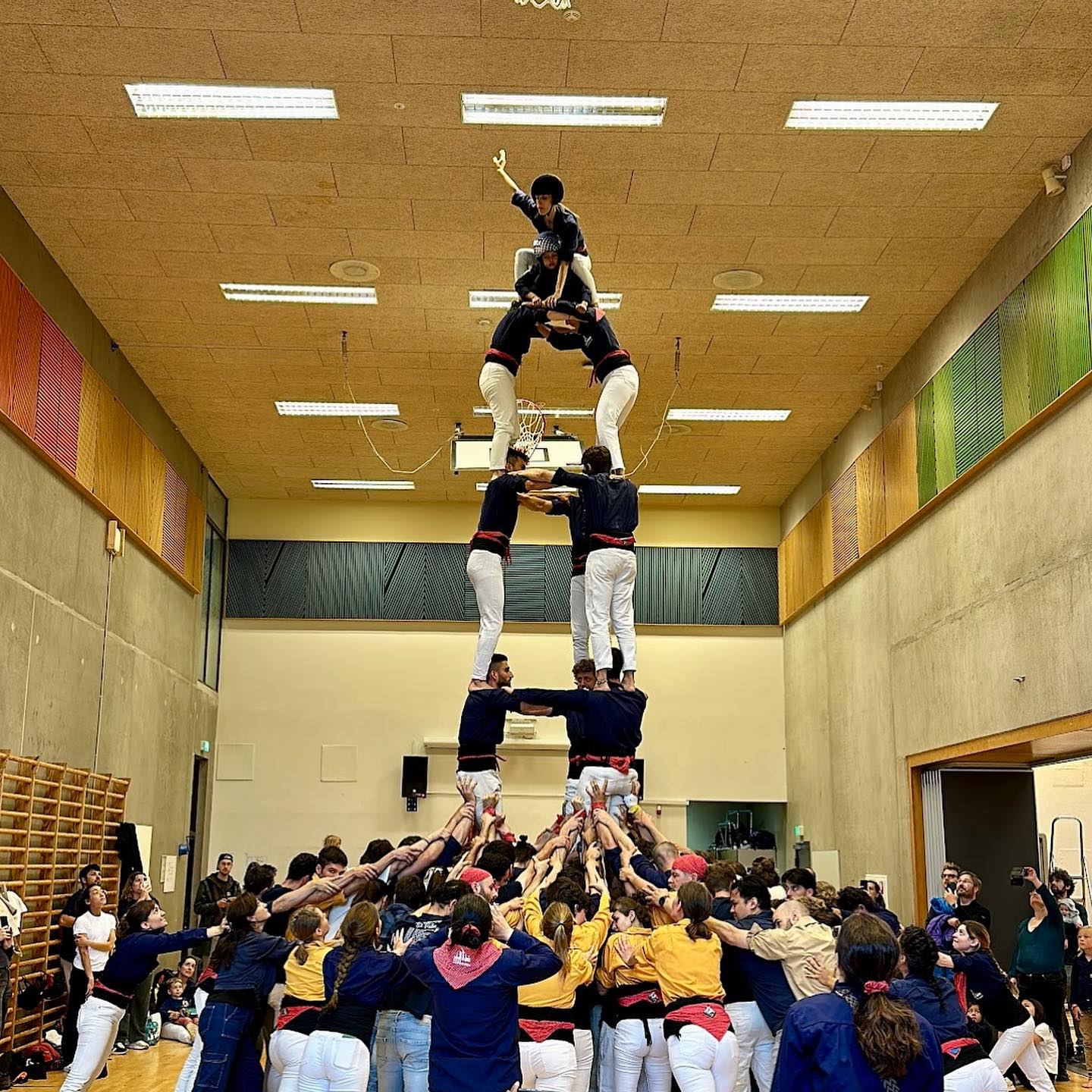
3d6

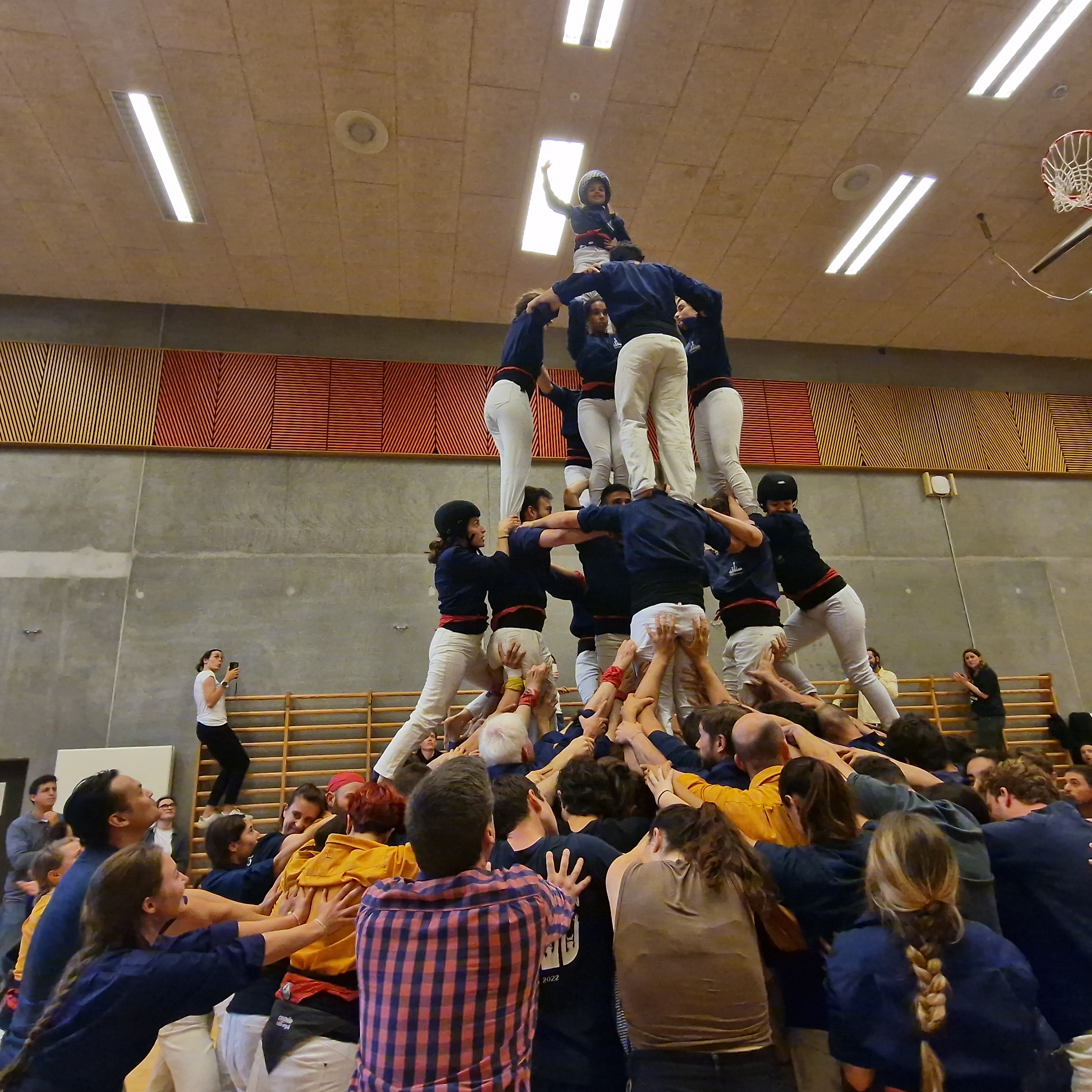
4d6a

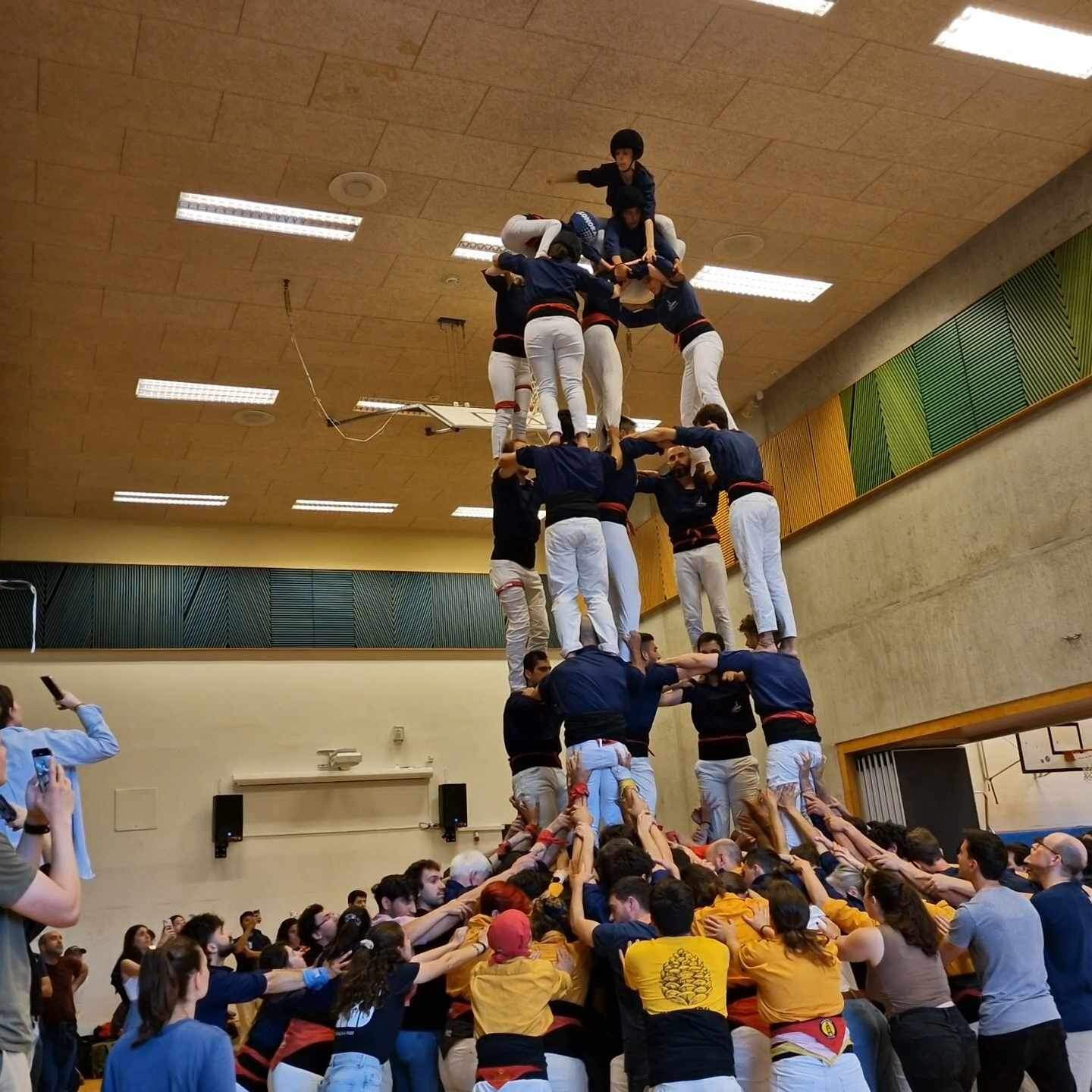
First ever 5d6 in Xiquets' history
- October 2024, Tarragona:

In October that same year, Xiquets repeated the same performance in Tarragona, during the International Diada within the XXIX Concurs de castells' weekend. As a note, Xiquets attempted the 2d6 for their first time in a performance, but had to be dismantled before completing it.

Castells: 3d6, 5d6, id2d6, 4d6a

- May 2025, Berlin:

The V International Human Towers Festival, held in Berlin in May 2025, gathered up to 10 colles and more than 400 castellers. Xiquets' performance with a 5d6 in the first round, an id4d7 in the second round and the colla's first ever 2d6. In the repetition round, Xiquets attempted again the 4d7, which fell with acotxadora in position and enxaneta at the level of thirds. All was preceded with an entry pd4.

Castells: pd4, 5d6, id4d7, 2d6, i4d7

- October 2025, Mataró:

Second joint performance with Capgrossos de Mataró. The colla completed their first ever 3d6a, followed by a 4d6a and 3d6. Xiquets also tried twice the 4d6 with only women in the trunk, which were dismantled before completing them.

Castells: 3d6a, id4d6, 4d6a, id4d6, 3d6, pd4.

- May 2026, Zurich:

Joint performance in Zurich with Castellers de Zürich, Castellers de París and Castellers de Lausanne. Xiquets completes their first 4d6 with only women in the trunk, together with a pd5f.

Castells: pd4, 5d6, id2d6, id2d6, id4d6, 4d6, pd5f, pd4.

=== "Colla de 7" ===
- October 2026, Tarragona:

In the International Diada withtin the XXX Concurs de Castells weekend, in Tarragona, Xiquets Copenhagen completed their first ever castle of 7 floors, a 4d7. Together with a 5d6 and their second ever 2d6, this performance became the best Diada ever for the colla. This achievement brought Xiquets Copenhagen to win the price Un Pis Més (one more floor) given by Baròmetre Casteller to those teams that raised a castle one floor higher up.

== Castells achieved ==
Castell	D	C	id	i	First achieved
3d6	6		4		Tarragona, October 2018
4d6	5		4		Copenhagen, June 2019
3d6a	1				Mataró, October 2025
4d6a	4				Copenhagen, June 2023
pd5f	1				Zurich, May 2026
5d6	5		1		Copenhagen, June 2024
2d6	2		3		Berlin, May 2025
4d7	1		2	1	Tarragona, October 2026

- D indicates a completed attempt. Built and brought it down.
- C indicates a castell that was built, but collapsed before bringing it down.
- id indicates a dismantled attempt (not crowned but it did not collapse).
- i indicates an attempt (collapsed before crowning it).

== Gallery ==
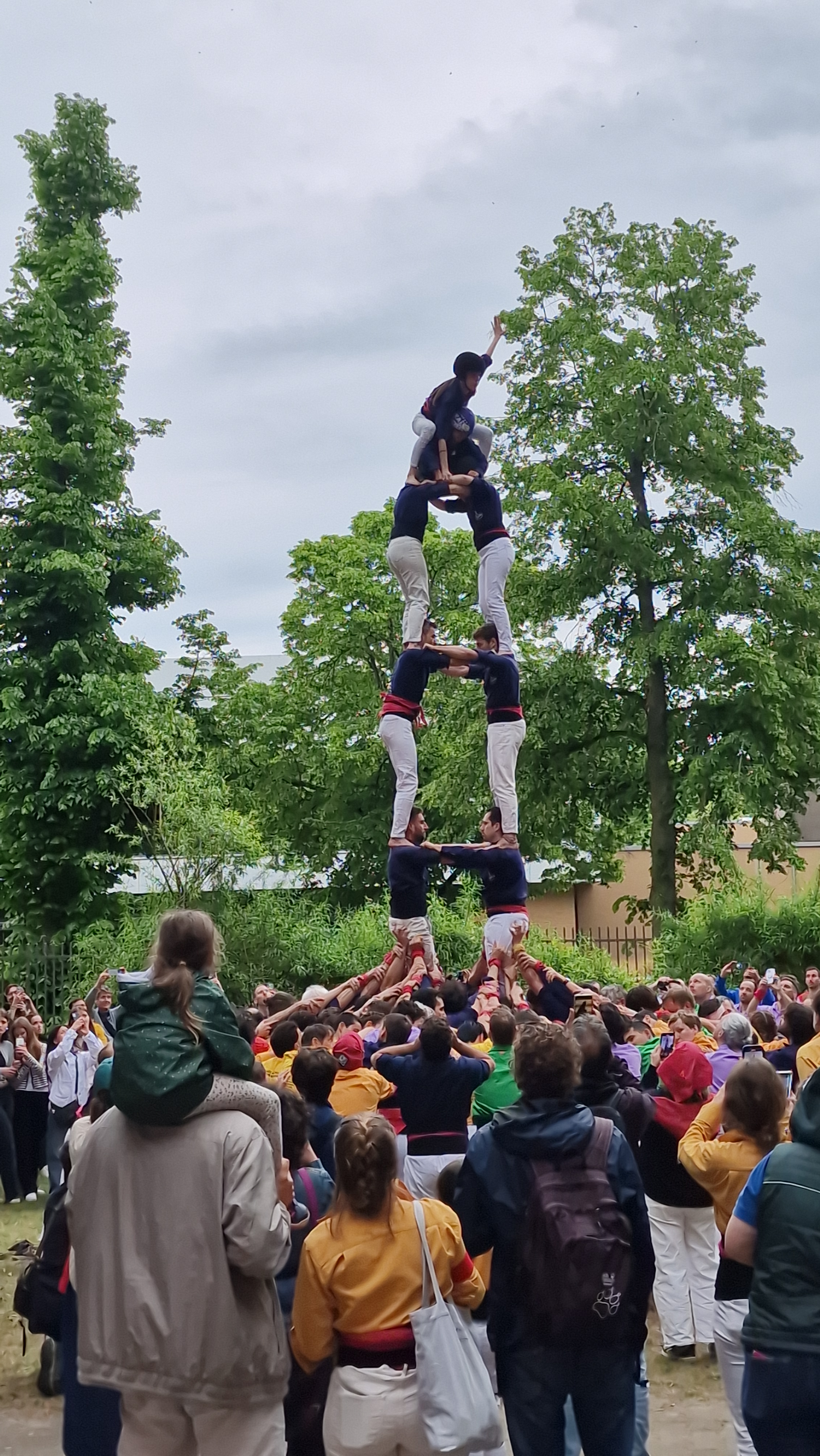
Xiquets' Copenhagen first ever 2d6, in Berlin in 2025

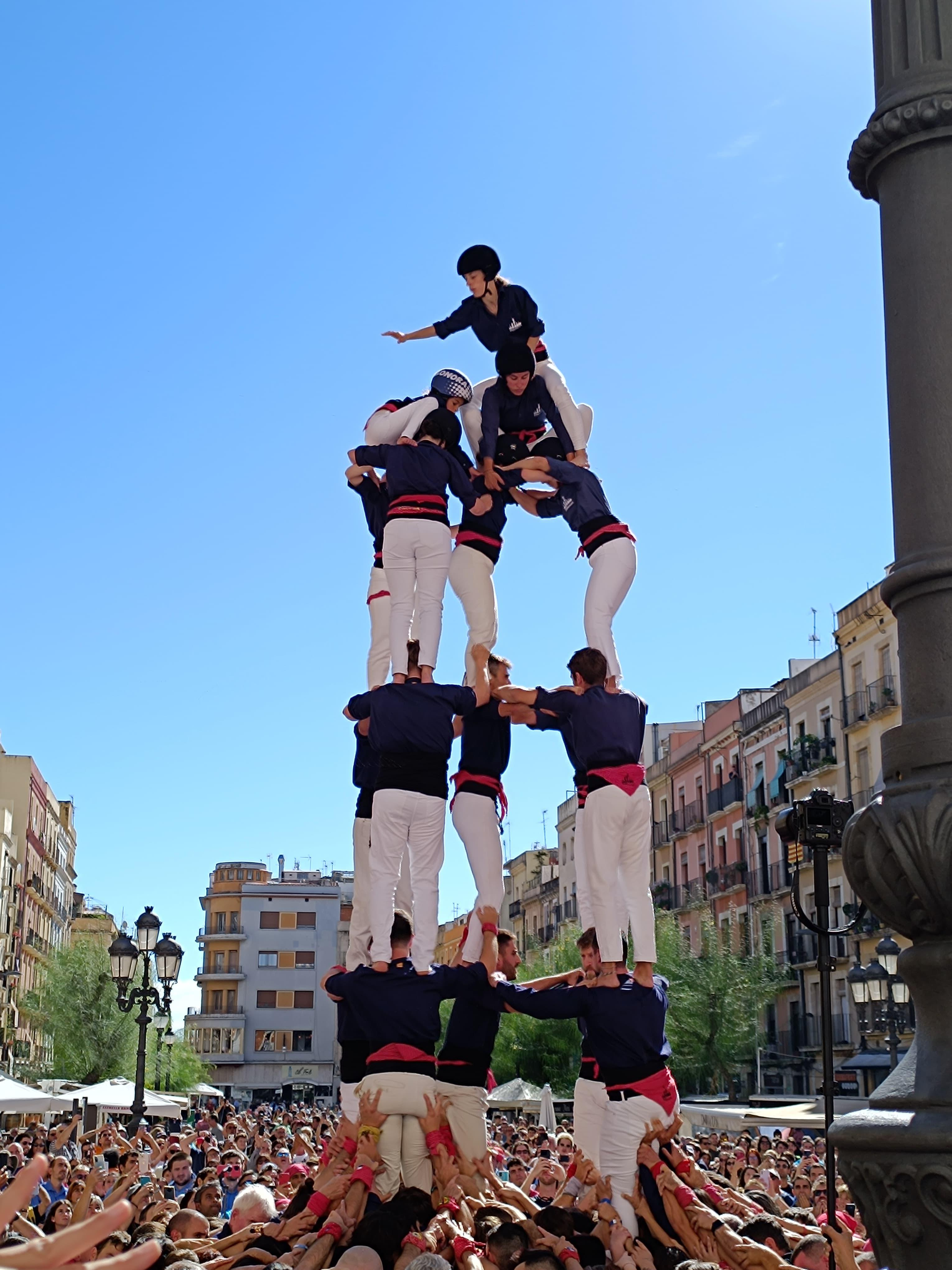
5d6 built in Tarragona in 2024

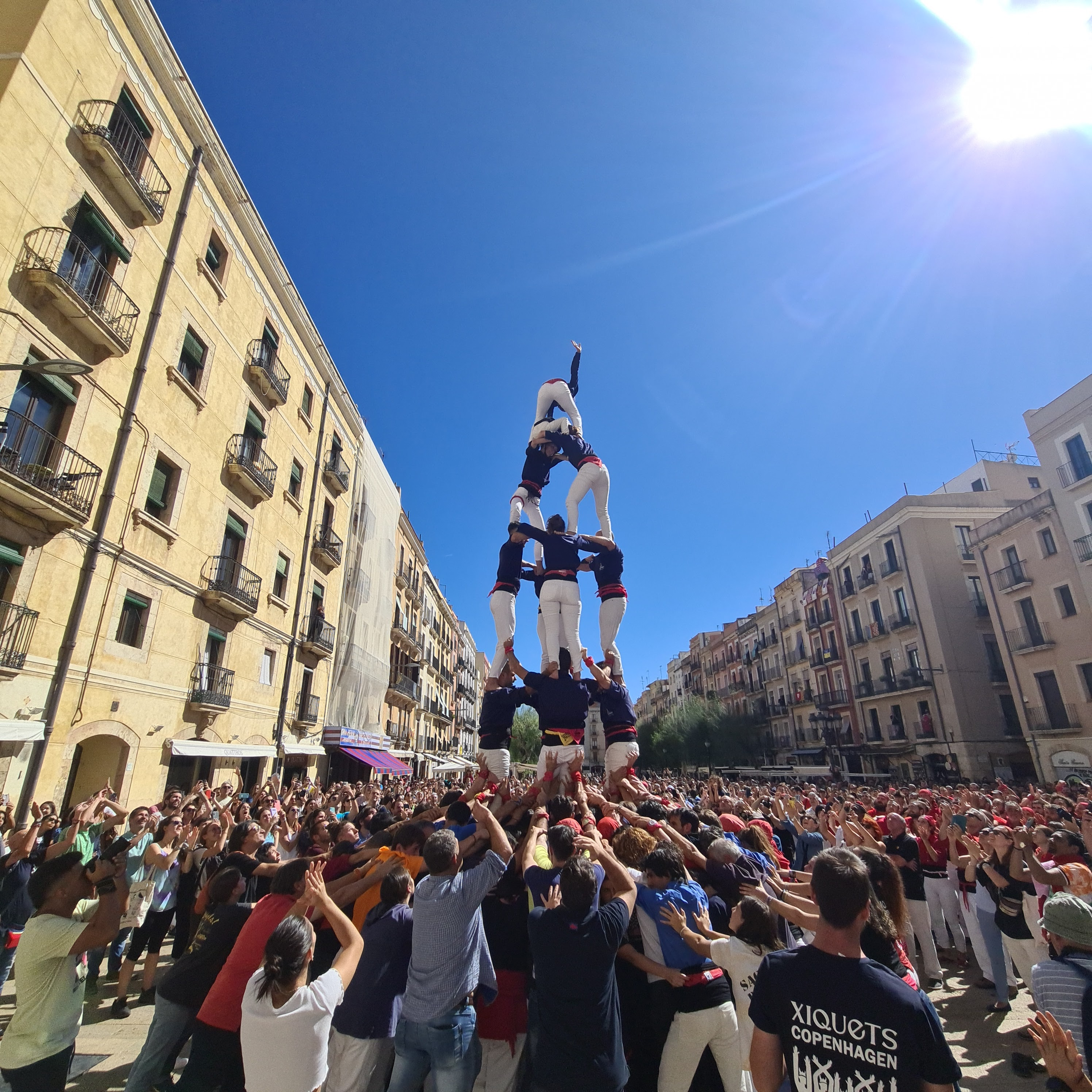
4d6 built in Tarragona in 2022

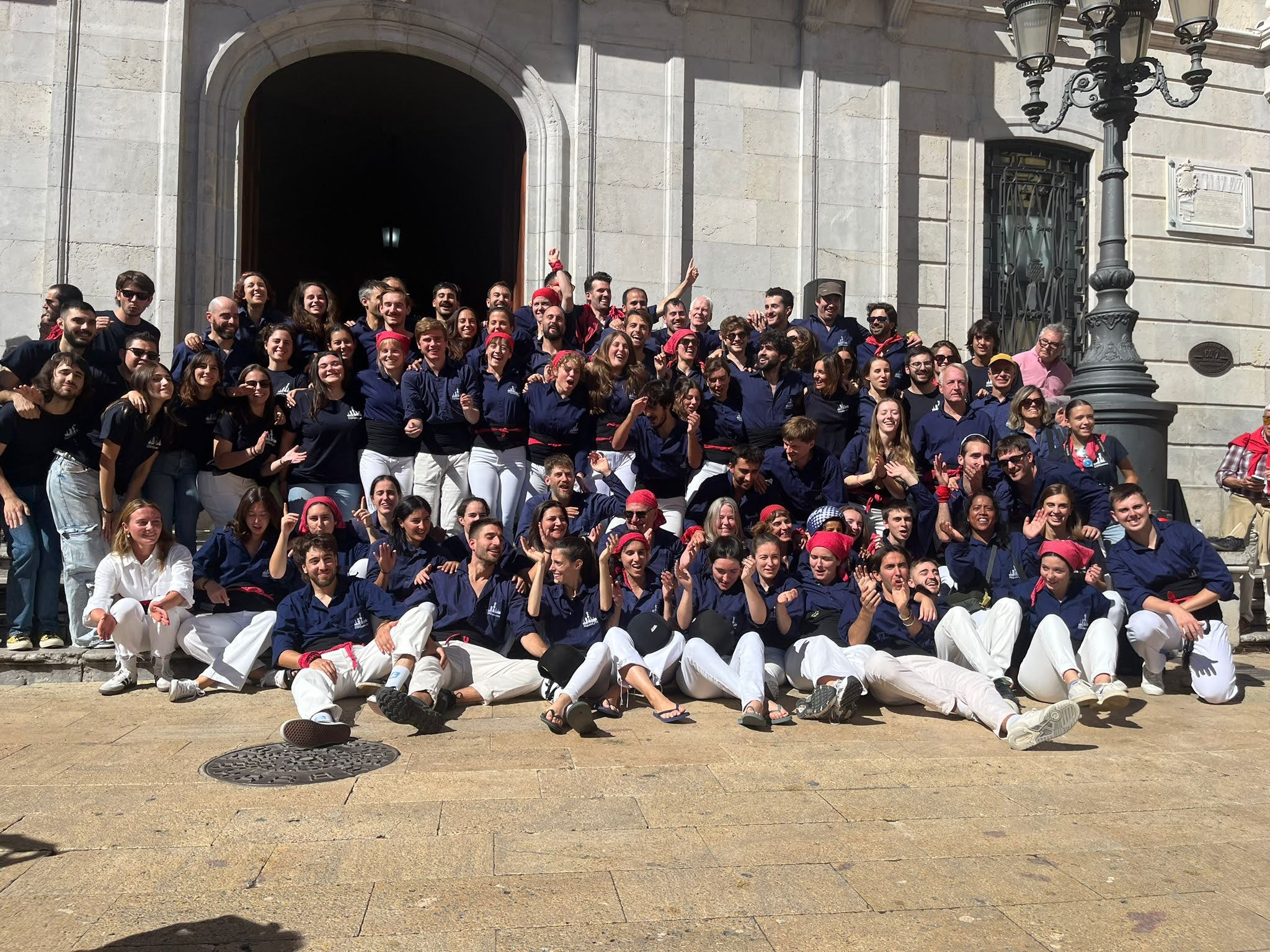
Tarragona 2024
