= Castellers of London =

- Foundation: 2015
- Shirt color: Red
- Location: London, United Kingdom
- Best towers: 5d6
- Best performance: 4d6a, 5d6, i2d6, 3d6a
- Official website: http://www.castellersoflondon.org.uk/

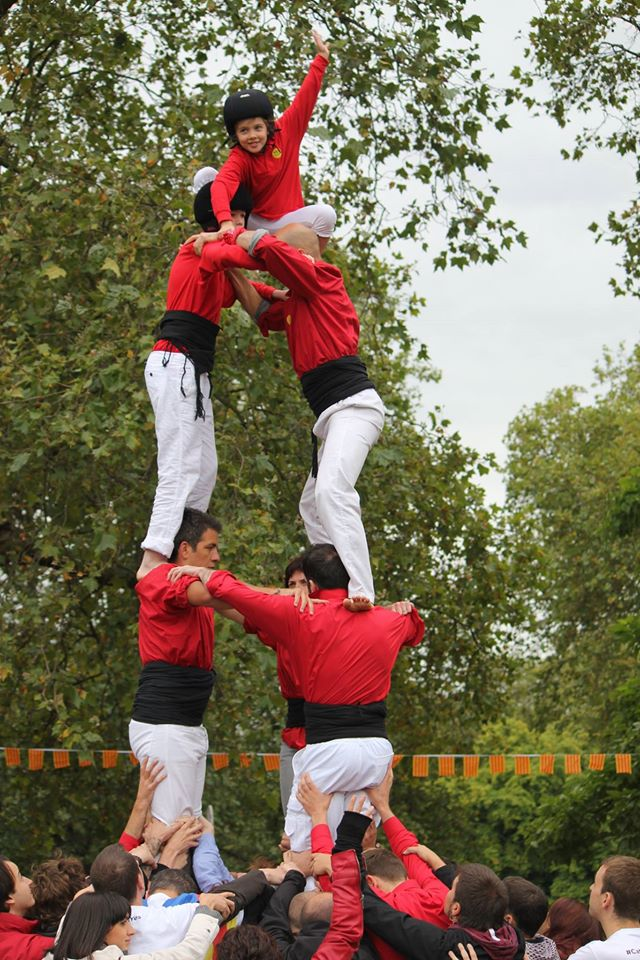

Castellers of London (CoL) is a group of people with an interest in building human towers (castells), a Catalan tradition that dates back more than 200 years, who live in London, England. Many of the people involved in CoL are from Catalonia, but the group also includes people of many nationalities. The goal of CoL is to promote the tradition of castells in the London area by holding open rehearsals and organising special events, such as exhibitions.

In 2015, a group of people experienced in building castells held a series of workshops to promote human towers in London and attract Londoners to attend their rehearsals. They started at Rochester Square Gardens in Camden, moved to Camden Garden, then to Regent's Park, then rehearsed in St Thomas the Apostle church in Arsenal North London, and started with 2 rehearsals per week in Guy's Hospital Southwark and the Thanet Community Centre. They continue to rehearse weekly in south London. CoL continues to expand its membership, and currently includes people of different backgrounds and all ages, as well as whole families.

Their debut performance took place during the Youth Fest in Tottenham on 18 July 2015. First pilar of 4 would not happen until 5 September 2015 during the celebration of the Catalan National Day in Kennington Park, Lambeth.

So far CoL are focused on building stable structures six levels tall.

== Management ==
CoL is an association run by its members and directed by two committees elected during the annual general meeting. These are the Management Committee and the Technical Team, and they are currently represented by the President and Cap de Colla, the head of the team, respectively.

Past presidents and Cap de Colla can be found in their official website.

== Performances ==
Castellers of London do few performances a year, highlights being the one for St George's day (usually in Borough Market or Camden Market), one in July around their anniversary and their Christmas diada. They also perform every year together with other international colles in what is called International diada.

Past performances and results can be found in their official website.

The best performance so far was 6 October 2018 in the II International Diada in Tarragona, performing 4d6a, 5d6, i2d6 and 3d6a.

=== Structures achieved ===
Construction	Total			2018			2017		2016		2015		First achieved
Construction	i	id	d	i	id	d	id	d	id	d	id	d	First achieved
2d6	1	0	0	1	0	0	0	0	0	0	0	0	---
5d6	0	1	2	0	1	2	0	0	0	0	0	0	7 July 2018
4d6a	0	0	6	0	0	2	0	4	0	0	0	0	3 June 2017
3d6a	0	3	4	0	1	3	0	1	2	0	0	0	9 December 2017
4d6	0	2	7	0	1	1	0	4	1	2	0	0	1 October 2016
3d6	0	1	10	0	0	4	0	4	1	2	0	0	1 October 2016
Total	1	7	29	1	3	12	0	13	4	4	0	0	

- i indicates an attempt that collapsed before it was crowned
- id indicates a dismantled attempt (not crowned but it did not collapse)
- d indicates a completed attempt

=== Participation in International "diades" ===
==== 2016 London ====
Castellers of London hosted the first International diada in Spitalfields Market. Castellers de Paris where the colla invited and they worked together to achieve their best performance to the date. Two structures of 6 levels were built but up to the acotxador. As the enxaneta did not climb, they count as dismantled attempts (id).

Result: (id)3d6, (id)4d6

==== 2016 Tarragona ====
Tarragona's council invited few international colles to perform in Plaça de la Font on Saturday prior to the Concurs de Castells. This time, Castellers d'Andorra and Xiquets Copenhagen were invited together with Castellers of London and Castellers de Paris. Castellers of London completed for the first time the two structures they could not complete for the previous International diada.

Result: 3d6, 4d6

==== 2017 Paris ====
To continue with the tradition, Paris invited this time the colles that participated in the latest diada. Castellers of London completed a new construction, the 4d6a, after two dismantled attempts of the 3d6a in their previous Christmas diada. This was the first time the colla completed a performance with 3 structures of 6 levels, becoming a colla of 6. They would repeat the same performance two more times during that year.

Result: 3d6, 4d6a, 4d6

==== 2018 Tarragona ====
Performance to take place on 6 October 2018 in Plaça de la Font, Tarragona. Castellers of London performed with Castellers de Paris, Castellers d'Andorra, Xiquets Copenhagen and for the first time, Colla Castellera de Madrid.

Their intention was to do their best diada yet with the 4d6a, 5d6, 2d6 and a p5 at the end. Madrid had the same goal, so both colles went all in with their objectives.

Colla Castellera de Madrid got the perfect diada but, unfortunately, the first attempt of 2d6 from Castellers of London collapsed when the enxaneta was climbing and they had to change the rest of the structures. They did a 3d6a in the repetition round and finished with 2 pilars of 4 instead of the planned pilar of 5. This was not an impediment for Castellers of London to do their best performance yet.

Result: 4d6a, 5d6, i2d6, 3d6a

==== 2019 Copenhaguen ====
Xiquets Copenhagen organized the International diada of 2019 that took place on 8 June. Apart from Castellers of London, they invited Castellers de París, Castellers d'Andorra, Castellers de Berlín and Colla Castellers d'Edinburgh.

CoL built three structures of 6 (3d6, 4d6 and 3d6a) and their robust p4 to finish. Overall, the 4 structures looked very stable. One of the highlights of the diada was the 2d6 built by Castellers of Paris for their first time.

Result: 4d6, 3d6, 3d6a, p4
