= Freedom Party (Denmark) =

Freedom Fighters Party
- Leader: Ruth Evensen
- Founded: 2007
- Headquarters: Smedegade 3; 4941 Bandholm
- Ideology: Euroscepticism

Website
- http://www.frihedskaemperne.dk/

The Freedom Fighters Party (Frihedskæmperne), founded on 7 July 2007 as the Freedom Party (Frihedspartiet, FP), is a Danish political party.

The party was founded by Ruth Evensen, former pastor of Faderhuset evangelical free church, Eivind Fønss and Agner Dalgaard.

One of the party's core policies is opposition to free abortion, and in fact the party announced its creation on the day that the Christian Democrats announced that they no longer opposed free abortion.
