= Faderhuset =

Faderhuset (the Father's House) was a Danish evangelical Christian free church based in the Copenhagen capital region. Faderhuset was best known for acquiring the ownership of the building in central Copenhagen known as Ungdomshuset, a building also claimed by young people from the Danish left-wing movement. Ungdomshuset figured prominently in world news the first week of March 2007 as riots broke out between the youth squatting in Ungdomshuset and the local police.

Faderhuset was founded in 1990 by the married couple Knut and Ruth Evensen who were involved in its leadership until the church closed down on January 1, 2014. Both have been involved in Christian movements since the 1970s. They started their own religious community in the beginning of the 80s in the Nørrebro district of Copenhagen. As of January 2007 the church had 120 members and was an approved religious community by the Danish state.

The group had close ties to a Christian primary school known as Samuelsskolen, which was closed by the Danish Ministry of Education because they were concerned with some of the practices at the school. Samuelsskolen used Accelerated Christian Education material. This is a curriculum developed in the United States by evangelicals which teaches that the Christian Bible is the source of truth and that evolution undermines the notion of sin and the need for Christ. However, the ministry had other reasons to close Samuelsskolen, and have allowed other Christian schools to continue using this material.

On 7 July 2007, Ruth Evensen started the Freedom Party (Danish: Frihedspartiet).
