= Young Communist League of Denmark (1999) =

The Danish Communist Youth League (Danish: Danmarks Kommunistisk Ungdomsforbund or DKU) is a Danish political organization for young communist activists. Founded in 1999, the DKU is the youth branch of the Arbejderpartiet Kommunisterne (Workers' Communist Party of Denmark). Headquarters are located in Amager, with branch offices in Aarhus, Randers and Odense. As other citizen's associations, DKU receives financial funding from the Copenhagen Municipality.

== History ==
DKU was founded in 1999, taking the name of the old Communist Party of Denmark youth wing (that had been disbanded in 1990), with the stated goal of fighting for anti-imperialism, for anti-fascism and for improvement of working class youth. In 2000, the DKU became the youth branch of the Arbejderpartiet Kommunisterne (Workers' Communist Party of Denmark).

Troels Riis Larsen served as the group chairman from 1999 to 2005. In 2005, Larsen was replaced as Chairman by Cathrine Frederikke Pedersen, a 23-year-old anthropology student from Copenhagen University.

== Radicalization ==
In the 2000s, the DKU became associated with violent demonstrations in Denmark. During the Ungdomshuset riots in 2007, the organization's president, Cathrine Frederikke Pedersen, advocated the use of firearms as a legitimate means for achieving political goals. Pedersen said that except for WMDs, all violent actions were permitted. The Danish Security Intelligence Service expressed concern about the DKU's radicalization.

Despite criticism of the organization's advocacy for violence, the DKU received 50,234 Danish kroner in public grants from the city of Copenhagen in 2007. City managers said support could only be withdrawn if an organization was disbanded through a criminal court case.
