= Workers' Communist Party (Denmark) =

Political party in Denmark

Workers' Communist Party Arbejderpartiet Kommunisterne
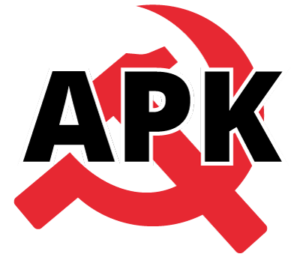
- Founded: April 2000
- Preceded by: Communist Workers Party (Denmark)
- Newspaper: Kommunistisk Politik
- Youth wing: Danish Communist Youth League
- Ideology: Communism; Marxism–Leninism; Hoxhaism; Anti-revisionism; Republicanism
- Political position: Far-left
- International affiliation: ICMLPO
- Colours: Red

Website
- www.apk2000.dk

Kommunistisk Politik is the central organ of the APK.

The Workers' Communist Party (Danish: Arbejderpartiet Kommunisterne, abbreviated APK) is a minor Danish Marxist-Leninist party. It was founded in Copenhagen in April 2000.

The Founding Congress of the APK adopted the general programme, "The Manifesto for a Socialist Denmark", and the action program, "All Together against Capital", as well as the statutes of the APK.

The organizational principle of the APK is democratic centralism.

APK's historical roots lie in the antirevisionist Party-Building Communist Organization October (Oktober), which emerged from the Communist Party of Denmark/Marxist–Leninists in 1997.

The central organ of the APK is the fortnightly Kommunistisk Politik (Communist Policy). Its theoretical journal is the publication Orientering (Orientations). Its international bulletin is the English-language Kommunistisk Politik International.

The youth organization of the APK is the Danish Communist Youth League (DKU).

The APK is an active member of the International Conference of Marxist–Leninist Parties and Organizations.

== See also ==
- List of anti-revisionist groups
