= Nørrebro =

District of Copenhagen, Denmark

- District
- Nørrebro seen from one of the lakes (Søerne) that separate the area from the inner city centre
- Etymology: Paved extension of Nørre Landevej outside northern gate
- Interactive map of Nørrebro
- Coordinates: 55°41′49″N 12°32′53″E

Area
  - Total: 3.82 km^{2} (1.47 sq mi)

Population (January 1, 2009)
  - Total: 71,891
  - Density: 18,800/km^{2} (48,700/sq mi)
- Postal code: 2200 København N

The districts of Copenhagen municipality: A: Indre By ("Copenhagen Center") B: Østerbro C: Nørrebro D: Bispebjerg E: Brønshøj-Husum F: Vanløse G: Valby H: Vesterbro/Kongens Enghave I: Amager Vest J: Amager Øst

Nørrebro (Danish: [ˈnɶɐ̯ɐˌpʁoˀ], NUH-rah-pro) is one of the 10 official districts of Copenhagen Municipality, Denmark. It is northwest of the city centre, beyond the location of the old Northern Gate (Nørreport), which, until dismantled in 1856, was near the current Nørreport station.

== Geography ==
Nørrebro has an area of 3.82 km^{2} (940 acres) and a population of 71,891. It is bordered by Indre By to the southeast, Østerbro to the northeast, Bispebjerg to the northwest and Frederiksberg Municipality to the southwest.

== History ==
Before 1852, Nørrebro was in the countryside. When the city decided to abandon the demarcation line in 1852, which had previously kept the city within very limited geographical limits, a building boom took place in Nørrebro. Nørrebro became the home of thousands of new workers, who came to seek their fortune in the city.

== Culture ==
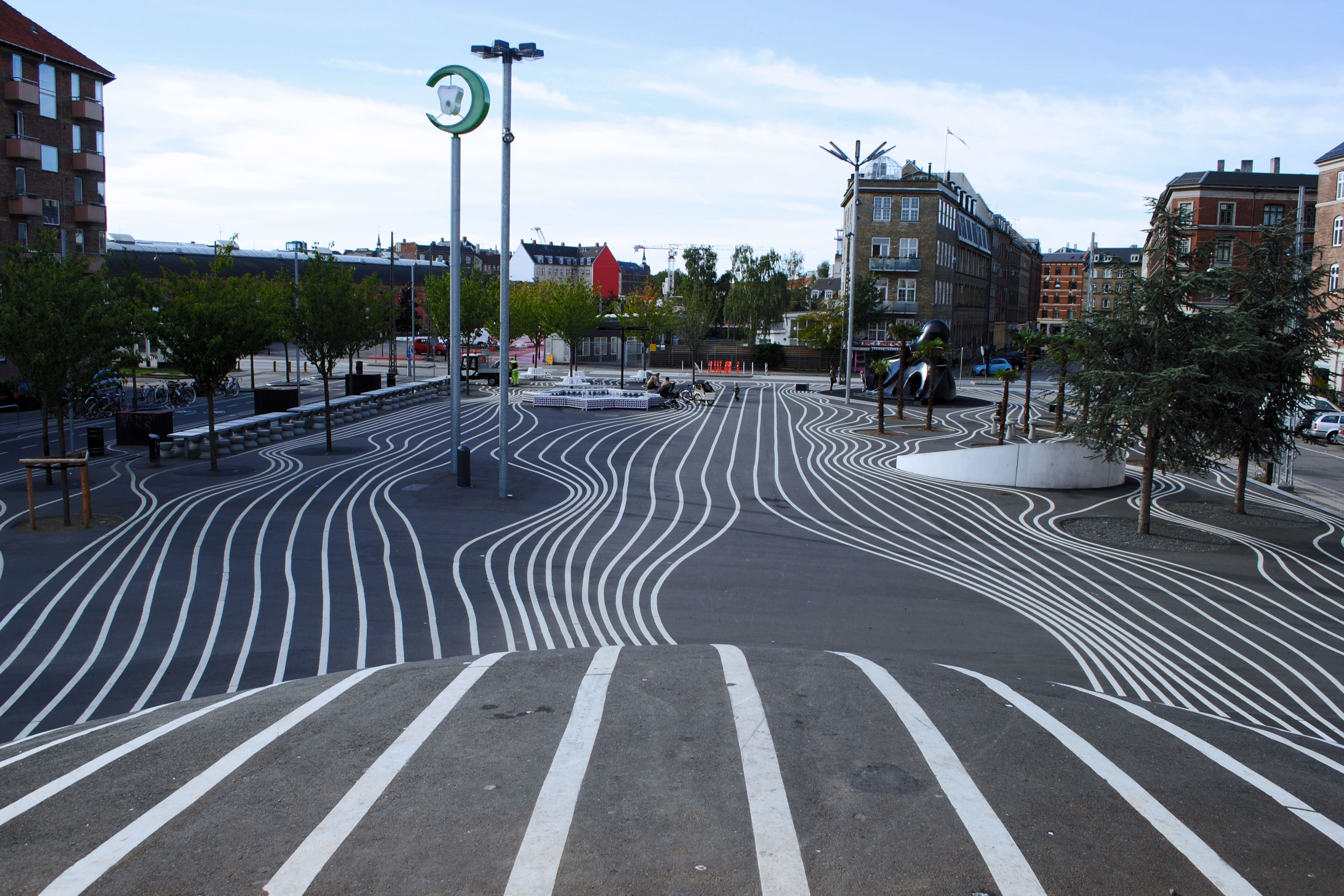
Superkilen, Nørrebro, Copenhagen

Nørrebro is known for its multicultural community. The multiethnic main street Nørrebrogade runs through the area, with a multitude of shops and restaurants. A cyclist association has claimed that this is the busiest cycling street in the world. One of the main points of interest in the area is historic Assistens Cemetery (Assistens Kirkegård), the final resting place of famous Danes such as Søren Kierkegaard, Niels Bohr and H.C. Andersen.

Nørrebro is inhabited by people from all parts of the world. In 2017, almost one out of six inhabitants had a non-Danish passport, hereof mainly a passport from a European (9.4%) or Asian (3.1%) country. The largest foreigner communities are Swedes (1.0%), Germans (0.9%), Norwegian (0.9%), Brits (0.8%) and Turks (0.7%).

In a Time Out magazine's 2021 poll of 27,000 urbanites evaluated by a panel of experts, Nørrebro was selected as the world's coolest neighbourhood. It highlighted the district's "dazzling blend of historic landmarks, ultramodern architecture and food and drink joints"

== Riots ==
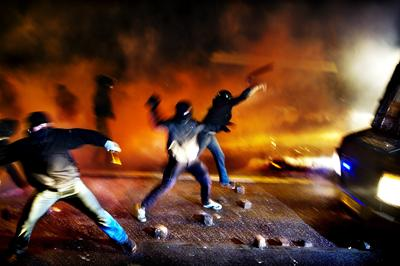
Rioters fighting police in Nørrebro 18 May 1993

Nørrebrogade is known as the site of many riots over the years. During the 1980s, it often provided the setting for violent clashes between Danish police and militant squatters known as BZ. The battles were of a very vicious nature, often involving Molotov cocktails and pipe bombs being used by the squatters, as well as batons, tear gas and firearms used by the police.

On 18 May 1993, the district was the scene of the Nørrebro riot following the Danish "yes"-vote to the European Union. The police were unprepared for the rioters, who threw paving stones from a nearby construction site. Subsequently, 113 shots were fired: several demonstrators were wounded, some severely. Though none of the protesters died at the time, the fight left 13 demonstrators and 92 policemen injured.

The riot was the worst since World War II, but although an official investigation was initiated there is still much doubt as to why the policemen were unprepared or what exactly happened. Following the riot the Danish police upgraded their hand-carried weapons and riot gear to modern standards and began a process towards better strategic and tactical handling of crowds and riots.

In late December 2006, a riot took place, regarding the fate of the squatted social centre Ungdomshuset ("The Youth House"), a rendez-vous point for the far-left. A demonstration in support of the house was blocked by the police and a fullface streetfight broke out. The demonstrators hurled stones and fireworks at the police, who in response used their armoured cars to disband the demonstrators and fired tear gas in to the crowd. The fight grew into a full-scale riot, with fires burning over night in the streets. Four police and two demonstrators were injured.

On 1 March 2007 the biggest riots in recent Danish history broke out when the police moved in and evicted squatters in Ungdomshuset, which was followed by the demolition of the building. It is estimated that the eviction of Ungdomshuset and the damage done during the following riots has cost the city and the state around 100 million danish kroner (around 17 million USD). On 1 September 2007 additional rioting resulted from a protest marking six months after the demolition of Ungdomshuset.

== Notable people ==
- Mads Mikkelsen (born 1965), actor
- Lars Mikkelsen (born 1964), actor
- Viggo Rivad (1922–2016), photographer
- Brian Jensen (born 1975), footballer

== See also ==
- Nørrebro station
- Blågårds Plads
- Public art in Nørrebro
- Superkilen - redevelopment project
- YNKB
