= Ungdomshuset =

Former music venue in Copenhagen, Denmark

Coordinates: 55°41′37.77″N 12°32′52.77″E

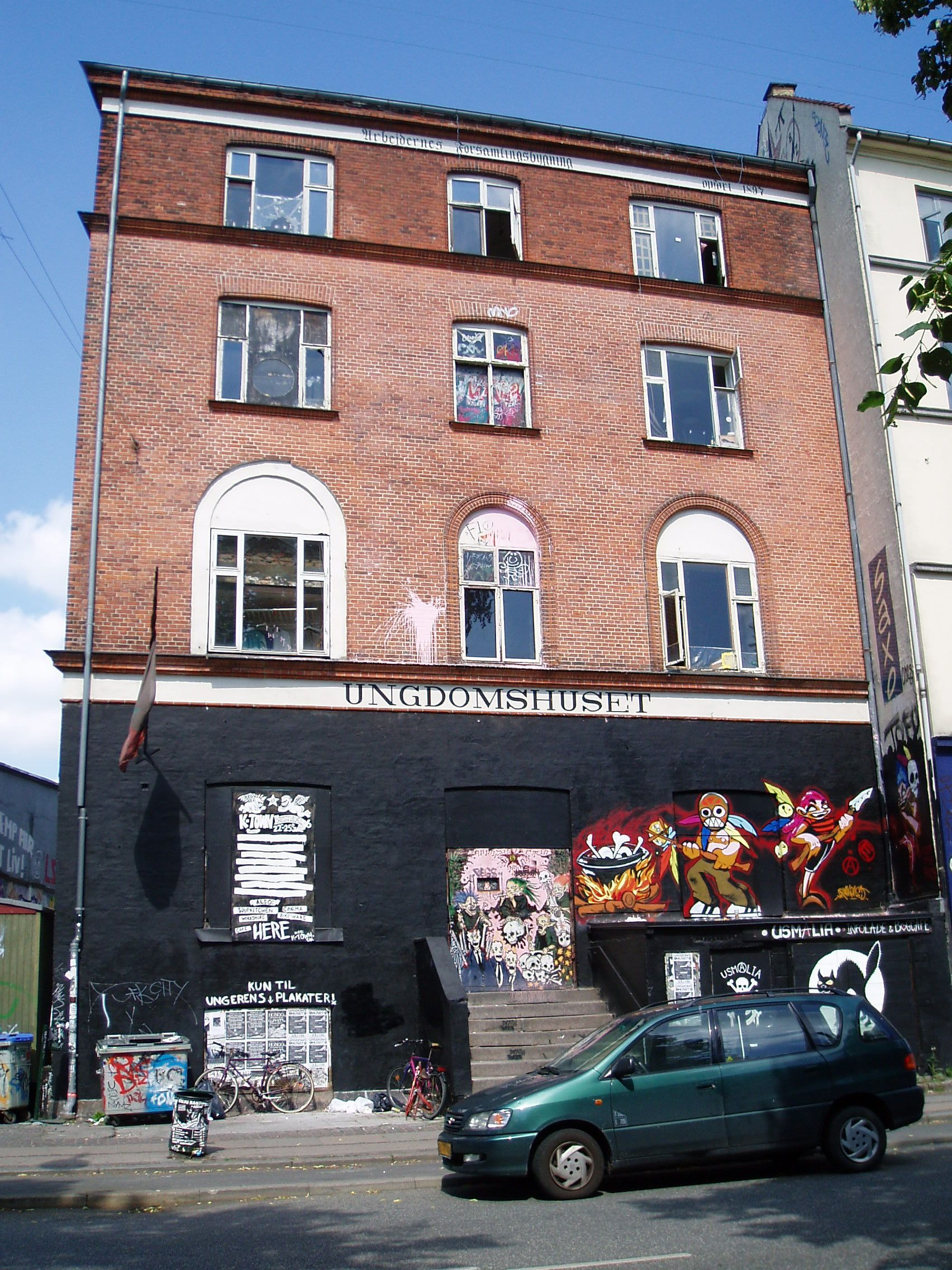
Ungdomshuset as seen from the street

Ungdomshuset (lit. 'the Youth House') is a social centre in Copenhagen, currently based at Dortheavej 61, Bispebjerg. Between 1982 and 2007, it was located at Jagtvej 69, Nørrebro. That building was originally named Folkets Hus ("House of the People"), constructed by Copenhagen's labour movement in 1897. It functions as an underground music venue and focal point for varying autonomist and leftist groups.

From the mid-1990s till 2007, Jagtvej 69 was the subject of intense media attention and public debate. This was due to an ongoing conflict between the Copenhagen Municipality and activists occupying the premises. In 2007, Ungdomshuset was evicted from Jagtvej 69 and the building was demolished. Police started to clear the Ungdomshuset building early on Thursday, 1 March 2007. Demolition began on 5 March, and was completed in two days.

After the eviction, users and supporters held weekly demonstrations on Thursday evenings, demanding a new location for the Ungdomshuset. The demonstrations would start from nearby Blågårds Plads. The starting location was later changed to Gammeltorv in downtown Copenhagen. In the summer of 2007, an initiative known as G13 announced that on the 6 October they would stage a massive public attempt to squat an old public waterworks located on Grøndalsvænge Allé 13 in northwestern Copenhagen to be used as a new Ungdomshuset. The event, which gathered several thousand, was announced as non-violent, but was met with heavy opposition from the police who arrested 436 people and threw large amounts of tear gas. Recognizing that the event, which had received heavy public attention, had been carried out with peaceful means, on 11 October Ritt Bjerregaard—the Lord Mayor of Copenhagen—invited spokesmen from Ungdomshuset to have negotiations concerning a peaceful solution to the conflict.

The new Ungdomshuset opened successfully on 1 July 2008, it is located at Dortheavej 61 in northwest Copenhagen's Bispebjerg area, after more than 16 months of weekly demonstrations.

== History ==
=== Folkets Hus ===
The building at Jagtvej 69 was completed on 12 November 1897, with the name "Folkets Hus" (The People's House). The house functioned as one of the resorts for the then-incipient labour movement of Copenhagen. Since labour organisations were unpopular in the eyes of the authorities, and reprisals were often carried out against them, the organisations had to build their own headquarters—Folkets Hus was the fourth of these to be built. The roots of several demonstrations and meetings were planted in Folkets Hus, and as a result it was strongly linked to the great demonstration against unemployment in 1918 when workers stormed the Copenhagen Stock Exchange (Børsen). In 1910, The Second International held an International Women's conference at the house, during which Clara Zetkin launched the idea of an International Women's Day. Vladimir Lenin and Rosa Luxemburg visited the centre.

During the 1950s it was still primarily used by the different sections, associations and unions of the labour movement. All kinds of different activities took place: for example, boxing matches and end-of-season dances.

Several years later, Brugsen, a Danish chain of supermarkets, bought Folkets Hus, planning to tear down the building and build a supermarket in its place. However, as this was prohibited due to the historic importance of the place, Brugsen sold the ground to the folk music ensemble Tingluti in 1978. As a consequence of a burst water main which they could not afford to repair, Tingluti had to sell the ground to the municipality of Copenhagen. The price at the time was DKK 700,000.

=== Ungdomshuset ===
In 1982, Folkets Hus was assigned to a group of young people—the original founders of Ungdomshuset—although the municipality of Copenhagen still owned the building. It was at this time that the building was given its current name: Ungdomshuset. It hosted musicians like Nick Cave and Björk in its early years.

In January 1996, Ungdomshuset was ravaged by a fire and found to be plagued by fungus and rot. The municipality of Copenhagen decided to close the house, claiming that it would be too expensive to repair the damages and renovate the building. The activists of the house decided to fix the damages themselves and on 1 March of the next year, their work was approved by the fire prevention department.

In 1999 the building was put on sale by the municipality. This prodded the users of the building to post a large banner on the facade with the message: "For sale along with 500 autonome, stone throwing, violent psychopaths from hell.". Despite this ominous warning, a company called Human A/S bought the building in December 2000 (although ownership did not actually change hands until 2001), after which Human A/S was sold to the independent Christian sect "Faderhuset". However, the squatters refused to leave the house. Until 1 March 2007 the young squatters used the house as if the change of ownership had not happened and the new owners were not allowed inside at any time.

Ungdomshuset received more than 500 visitors a week.

=== Ownership and usage case ===
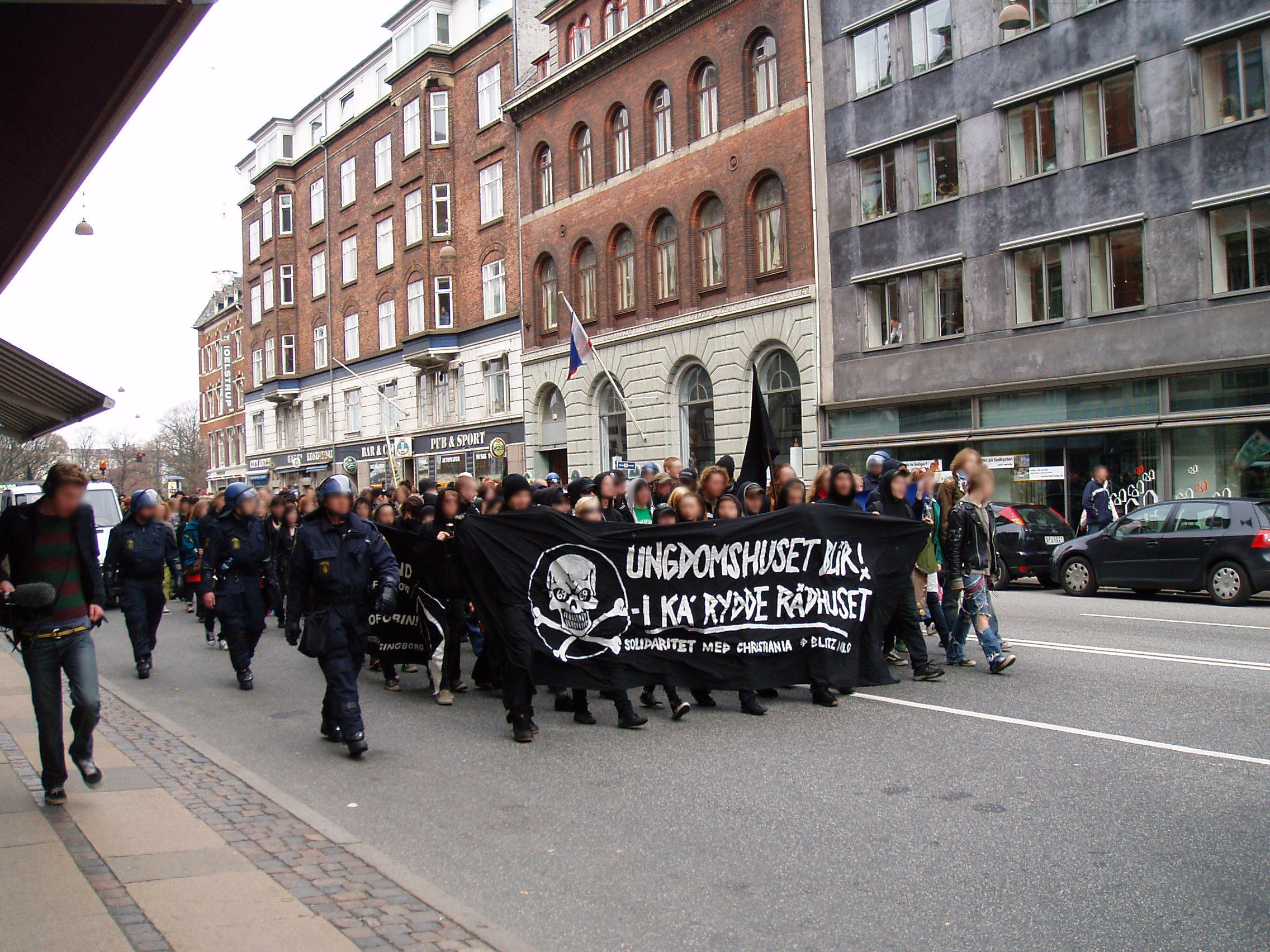
1 May 2006 demonstration

In August 2003, Faderhuset served a writ upon Ungdomshuset and its users and claimed ownership of the building. In December the same year, the trial began at the Copenhagen County Court.

On 7 January 2004 the verdict from City Court arrived, stating that Faderhuset was entitled to sue four activists (rather than Ungdomshuset itself). Both sides appealed against the decision; Faderhuset demanding compensation and Ungdomshuset demanding the future right of usage. On 28 August 2006 the National Court stated, as the City Court did, that the right of ownership and usage of Ungdomshuset belonged to Faderhuset and it was free to evict the inhabitants.

Originally, this decision ordered the current occupants out by 9:00 a.m. on the morning of 14 December 2006. Ungdomshuset was also denied the right of appeal to the Supreme Court, meaning that they had no further options within the legal system. The police, however, stated that they would not evict the activists until 2007.

The activists refused to leave the house and barricaded themselves inside. In addition, an open-letter stating "Troublemakers of the World; We bid you Welcome!" had been sent to different autonomous groups around the world, asking for help defending the house in the event of a forced eviction.

On 12 December, Faderhuset refused an offer from the foundation "Jagtvej 69" to sell the house for DKK 13 million.

On 16 December, around 2000 activists, some of them foreigners, demonstrated in Copenhagen in support of Ungdomshuset. The police had not been notified of the demonstration. The vanguard of the demonstration wore masks or helmets, which is not permitted by law during demonstrations in Denmark. The police ordered the demonstration to break up and the demonstrators to disperse. The demonstrators attacked the police; stones and fireworks were thrown at the police and burning barricades set up. The demonstration degenerated into what the police characterised as the worst riots in Denmark in many years—they used teargas, which was a very rare occurrence in Denmark. Both police and demonstrators were injured.

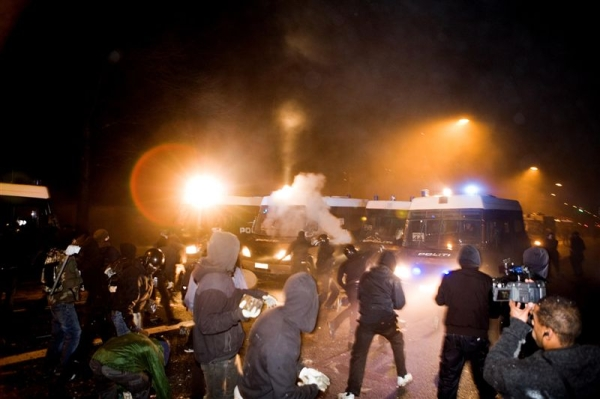
Demonstrators charging police on Jagtvej

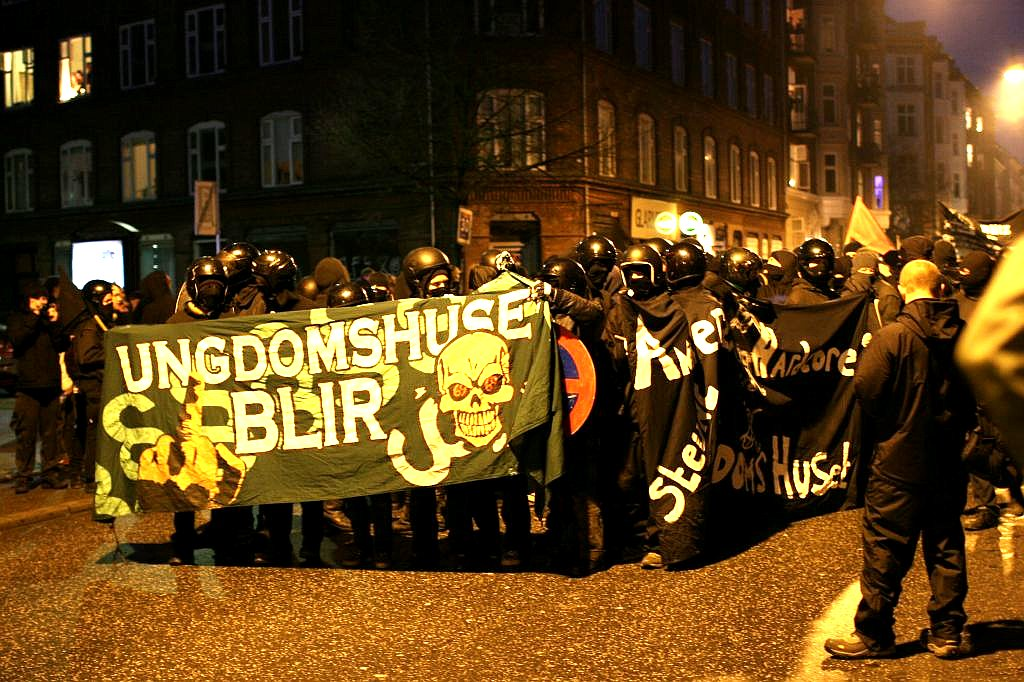
Vanguard of the 16 December demonstration

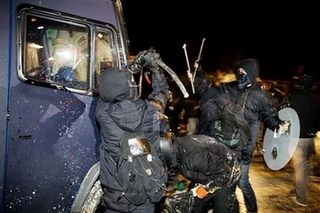
Demonstrators attacking police riot van.

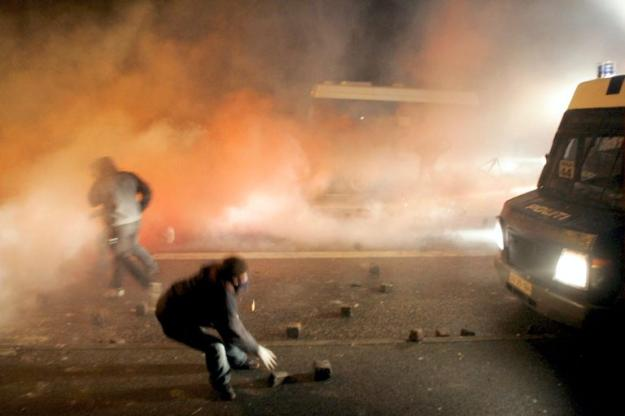
The police used a large amount of teargas against the demonstrators

By the end of the night 273 people had been arrested. The majority of those arrested were released the following day, 17 December.

=== Clearance ===
The first helicopter arriving with police officers

On 1 March 2007 Ungdomshuset was cleared of its occupants by the police at about 7:00 (CET) in the morning. A 50-metre area surrounding the building was sealed off. The building was taken with assistance from a military helicopter, an airport crash tender and two boom cranes, used as a form of modern-day siege towers. Special forces entered the building from the roof, the windows and the ground, while the house was covered in foam to diminish the effectiveness of possible counterattacks such as Molotov cocktails. Afterwards the supporters of Ungdomshuset announced that it was "either an Ungdomshus or a battle for an Ungdomshus — the clearing will never be forgiven". Rioting broke out, including a blockade of Nørrebrogade, the main street of Nørrebro, and fires in the areas surrounding Freetown Christiania and south of Nørrebrogade. Containers were turned over, windows were broken. Molotov cocktails were thrown out by the demonstrators, at the cries of "The street is ours!" Setting up barricades, they played alter-globalization songs such as Manu Chao from trucks. Riot police used tear gas (CS gas) on several occasions throughout the riots. The entire area was unsafe and neighbors to Ungdomshuset were told to stay indoors. It was unsafe to walk the streets because of the riots and because the police proclaimed that anyone without a valid reason for being on the streets would be arrested. There were also demonstrations in Oslo carried out by the Blitz community. The police moved out with police dogs and were prepared to use tear gas.

On 3 March 2007, there was more rioting outside Ungdomshuset, and by 12:36 am local time, the area of Nørrebro was completely overrun. At the same time further riots were taking place in the area around Freetown Christiania. Rioters used cars and rubbish bins to build barricades and set fires on the streets. One fire spread to a nearby kindergarten but was quickly extinguished. In a secondary school, the library and media room were ransacked and books and computers were burned on the street. The cost of the damages at the school was estimated to be around 1 million Danish kroner (133,000 euros). On the same day, the famous Little Mermaid was painted pink and a graffiti '69' and circle-A was painted on the stone on which the statue rests. Although police would not confirm a link between this event and the Ungdomshuset riots, the graffiti seems a reference to the squat's address, and news sources around the world used the incident to mention the 3 March riots at the same time.

Also that morning, police raided six to eight addresses in Nørrebro in an attempt to find and deport foreign activists. Although foreigners were the primary target of these raids, a larger number of those arrested were Danes. The members of Ungdomshuset's legal support group (retsgruppen) were supposedly amongst those arrested, but police described this as 'purely coincidental'.

In total, the police carried out raids searching for activists for six days and six nights, for example at the People's House of Stengade, at an independent collective in Baldersgade, at the Solidaritetshuset and in many personal flats in Copenhagen. More than 140 foreigners were arrested on the grounds of "presumption of danger", without being charged. This was denounced by the Association of Parents against Police Brutality. Many under-age people were arrested and registered in data bases. The frontiers were controlled. In total, 690 arrests were made in three days.

Riot police in front of burning barricade

The operation had an international scale, and has even been qualified by Le Monde diplomatique as "a 'laboratory experience' in police repression." Twenty Swedish police vehicles were brought over from Malmö, and five senior Swedish police officials invited for observation. Witnesses have claimed that plainclothes police agents, wearing earphones, circulated in the scene of the riots, speaking foreign languages (German, French and English). Asked by a Danish newspaper, the Copenhagen's police's spokesman denied the presence of active units from others countries. However, he recognized that, "if there had been" some, it was "in quality of observers". Other analysts noticed that the same tactics used by the French police during the 2006 students' protests against the First Employment Contract (CPE) had been used: special units of undercover agents moving around the demonstrators, and suddenly grabbing those who seemed to be the leaders. Since the Internet had been used by the demonstrators to coordinate their movements, hour by hour, informing about the police's whereabouts, a new priority of the police forces, according to Le Monde diplomatique, was to pirate this information.

=== Demolition ===
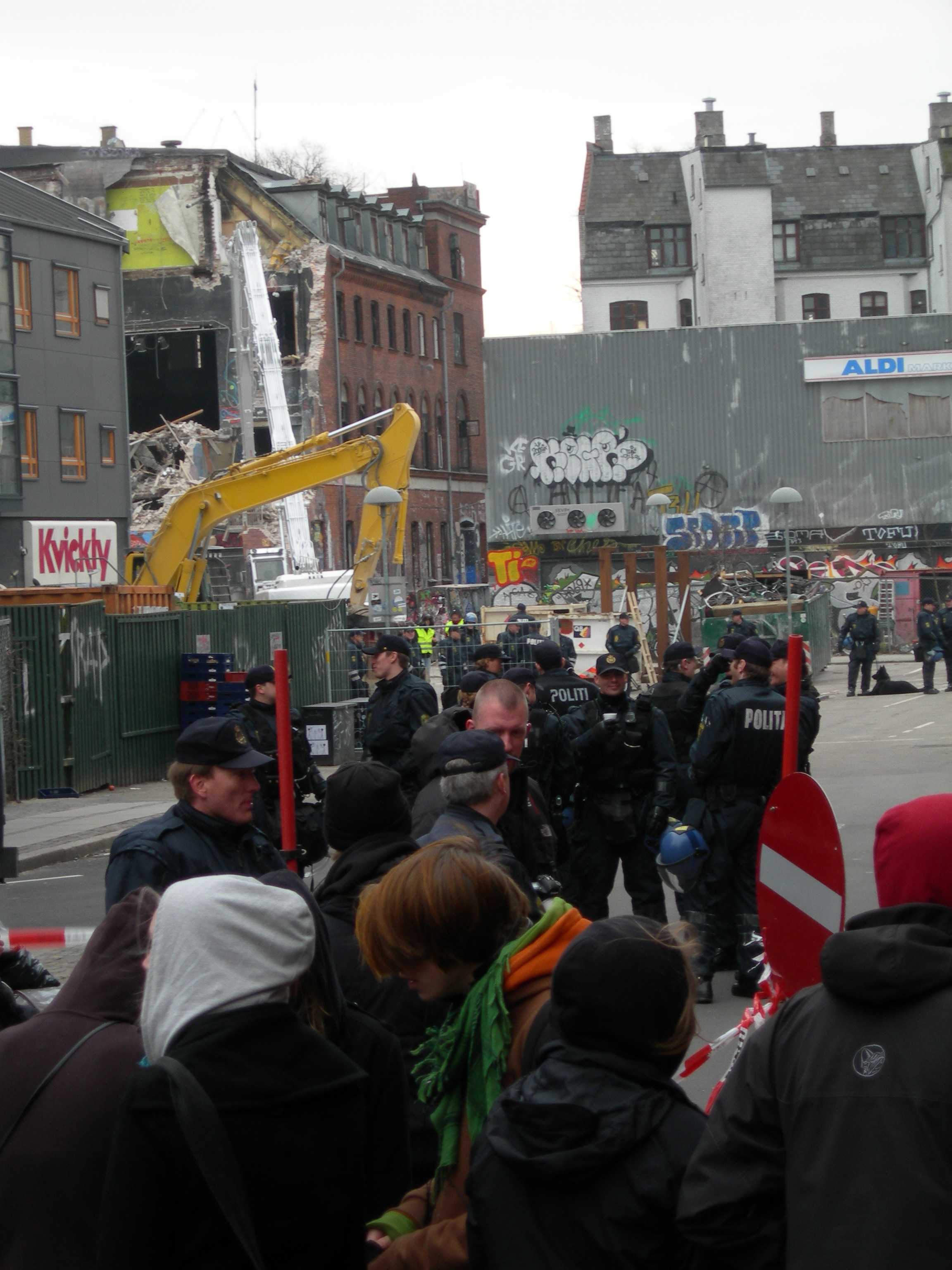
The rear of Ungdomshuset as it was being demolished on the morning of 5 March 2007

Demolition of Ungdomshuset began at 8 am on 5 March 2007. A demolition crane started its work at the back of the house with the top floor. The logos on the crane were covered and workers wore masks to conceal their identity. The union representing Ungdomshuset was on the ground trying to persuade the workers to stop working and reveal the company they were working for. At 10 am the Danish Working Environment Authority (Danish: Arbejdstilsynet) had the demolition interrupted due to reported concerns about dust and the potential presence of asbestos. The demolition resumed at 11 am. At 4 pm, about one-third of the house had been removed. The demolition was broadcast live by webcam on TV2 News' website.

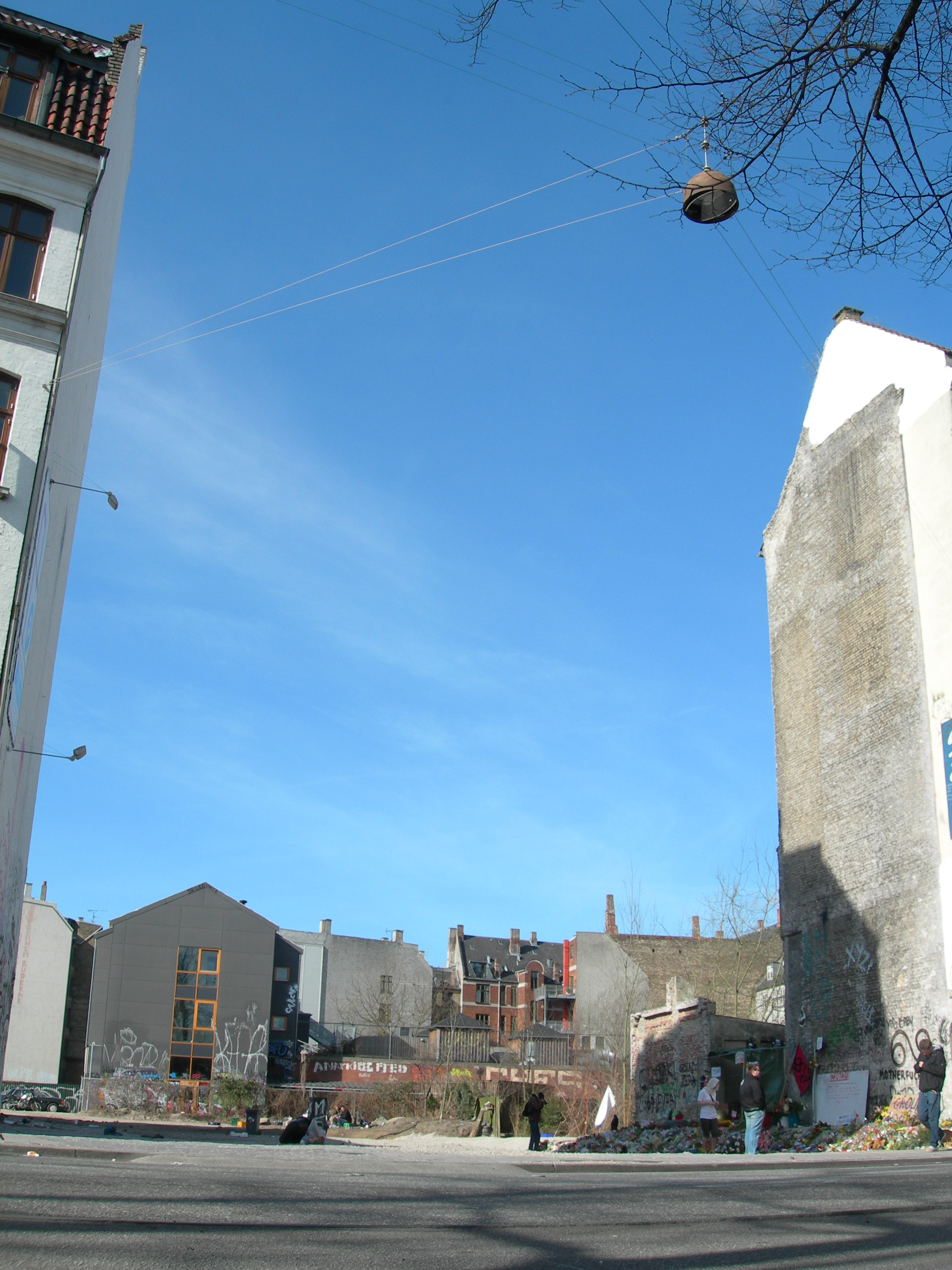
The site after demolition

In protest at the eviction of the centre, demonstrations have been held across Europe. Germany has seen more than twenty actions and there have also been solidarity protests in Austria, Finland, the Netherlands, Italy, Norway, Sweden and Poland. There were also protests in front of Denmark's UN Consulate in New York City — although it only counted eight persons during the -8 Celsius weather.

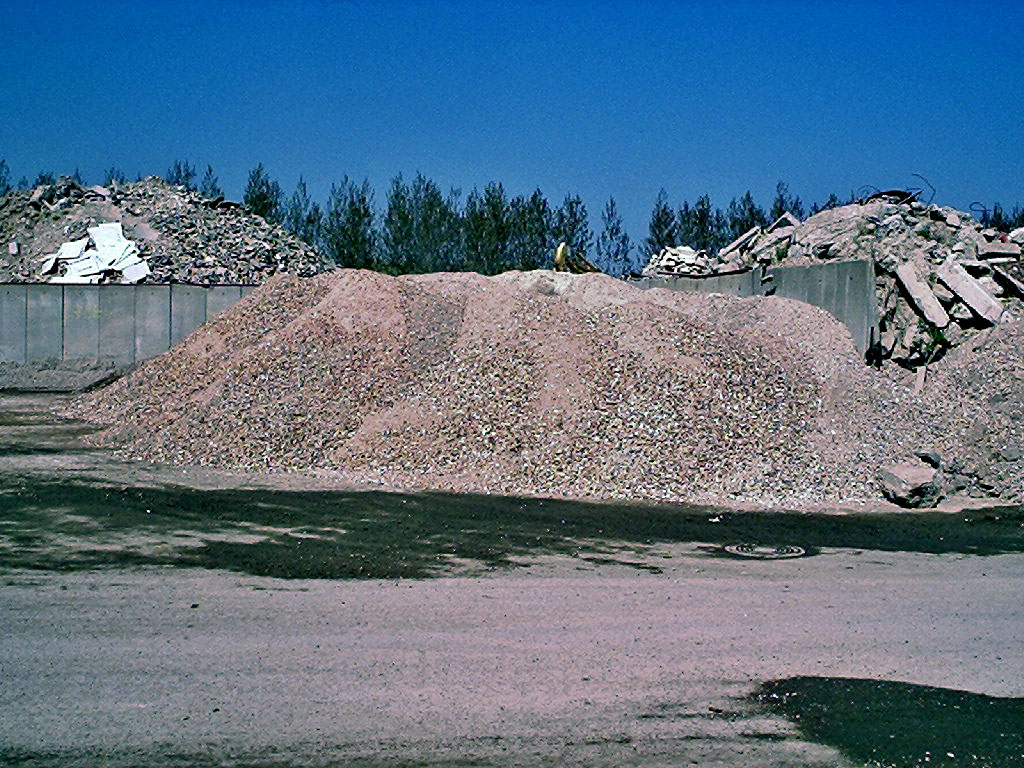
The debris was crushed for recycling and sold.

A women's demonstration took place on 8 March, comprising more than 3,000 people. The police carried out systematic identity controls. In total, more than 750 people were arrested during the events (among them, about 140 foreigners). Based on a population of approximately a million in Copenhagen, the Monde diplomatique noticed that if the same proportion of arrests had been carried out in Paris, 8,000 persons would have been detained. Since the police did not have the facilities to detain this number of people, many of them were transported to Funen or to Jylland. A penitentiary building of Copenhagen had to be partially emptied of its common law detainees to make place for the arrested youth. From 10 March to 19 March, Nørrebro and Christianshavn were decreed zones where any citizen could be searched and registered on databases, even without reasonable grounds for suspicion.

On the 1 of March 2007, 150 people gathered around the Danish Embassy in Oslo, protesting against the demolition of "Ungeren". They threw paint and snowballs against the Embassy. The Norwegian Police was at presence, with a great number of Police officers.

On 16 March 2007, Danish police admitted to having mistakenly used a potentially lethal form of delivery system for tear gas. The projectiles, known as Ferret 40, were used against crowds during the riots following the demolition, although the cartridge is designed and marketed as a barricade-penetrating round. It is shot from a military shoulder-fired 40 mm grenade launcher.

According to Professor Lars Dencik, from the University of Roskilde, the Danish state used the opportunity of this evacuation to test its anti-terrorist security forces (as any other opportunity, or real danger, was non-existent).

=== New Ungdomshuset ===
The new Ungdomshuset opened successfully on 11 July 2008, located at Dortheavej 61 in northwest Copenhagen's Bispebjerg area. This was after weekly demonstrations since March 2007.

On Monday 22 December 2008, five women and ten men who were present in the house at the time of eviction, received sentences of imprisonment. Eleven people were sentenced to one year and three months, three people to one year and one (aged under 16) to nine months. They were sentenced with preparing to assault police officers, and preparing violence.

In a Channel 4 interview, broadcast on 14 November 2011, British undercover police officer Mark Kennedy claimed that his inside intelligence was instrumental in the eviction of the original Ungdomshuset.

== See also ==
- Autonomism
- Battle of Ryesgade
- The Blitz in Oslo, Norway
- Freetown Christiania
- Squatting
- Turbonegro (first show at Ungdomshuset in 1989)
- Kunsthaus Tacheles
- Social center
