= Amerika Plads =

Urban area in Copenhagen, Denmark

Coordinates: 55.6997°N 12.5941°E

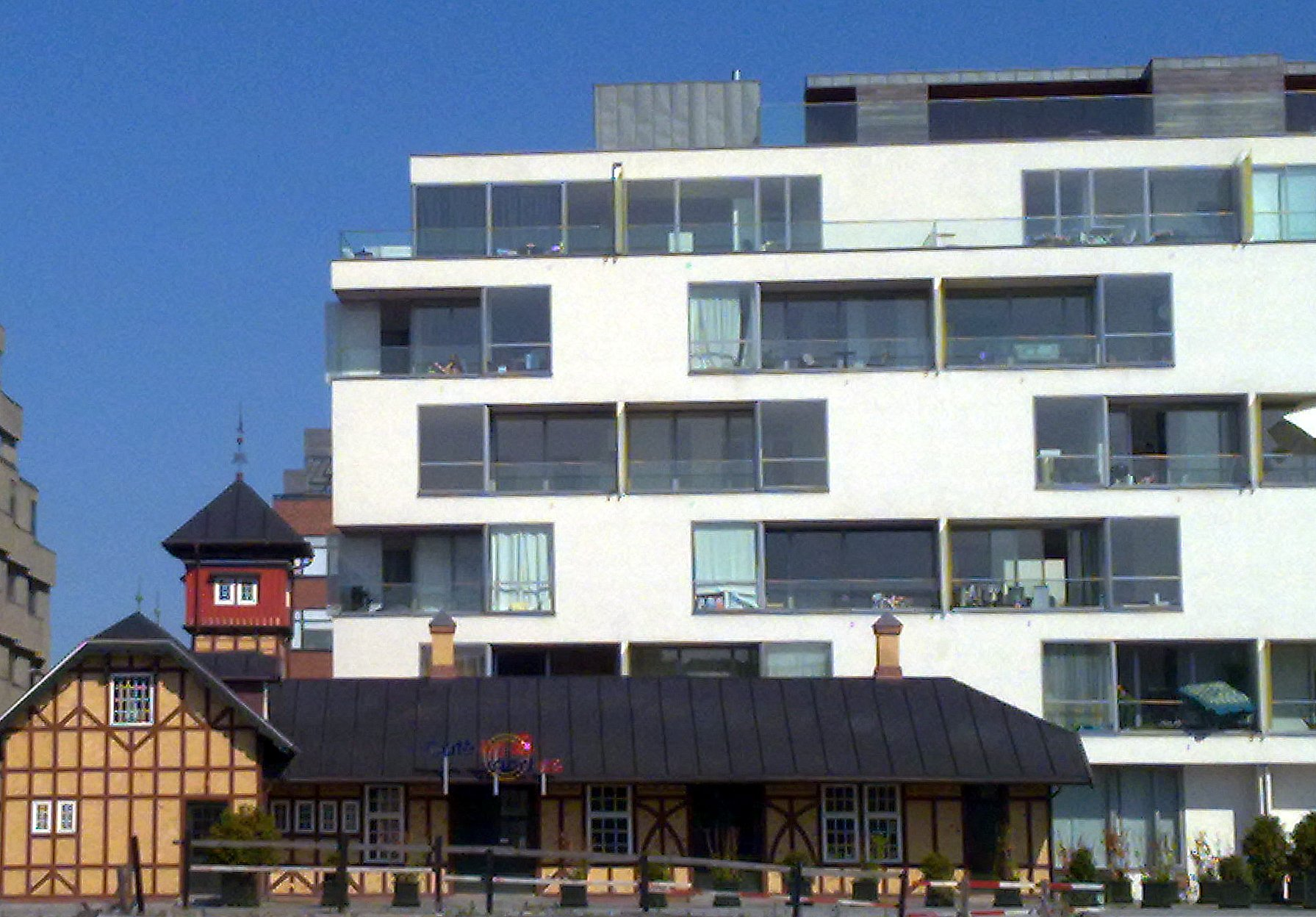
The former Free Port Station and a modern Nordlyset, a modern residential building designed by C. F. Møller Architects

Amerika Plads (lit. "America Square") is a public square and surrounding neighbourhood in the Østerbro district of Copenhagen, Denmark. It is the result of a redevelopment of an area in the southern part of the former Freeport of Copenhagen into a mixed-use neighbourhood which consists of dwellings, offices and retail establishments, combining converted historic buildings and modern architecture. The former Free Port Station building was put in storage during the redevelopment and is now located in the middle of the square where it serves as a café. The area is to the west bounded by Kalkbrænderihavnsgade, part of a major thoroughfare, and to the east by Dampfærgevej connected to Kalkbrænderihavnsgade in both ends and separating Amerika Plads from America Quay, the western quay of the Southern Free Port dock. The name of the area, like that of the quay, is a reference to the Amerikabåten, large passenger ships which used to transport Danish emigrants to New York City during the first half of the 20th century.

== History ==
Dating from circa 1903, the name Dampfærgevej (English: Steam Ferry Road) refers to the steam ferries to Malmö which used to berth on the north side of the area. The Copenhagen-Malmö link was founded as a joined venture between the Swedish and Danish state railways in 1895 in connection with the opening of the new free port in Copenhagen. The Amerika Plads neighbourhood is located in the former steam ferry terrain. The route was discontinued in 1974.

In 1986, the premises were taken over by DanLink which operated a cargo line on the route Copenhagen-Helsingborg until 30 June 2000 when it closed due to the opening of the Øresund Bridge.

== Redevelopment ==
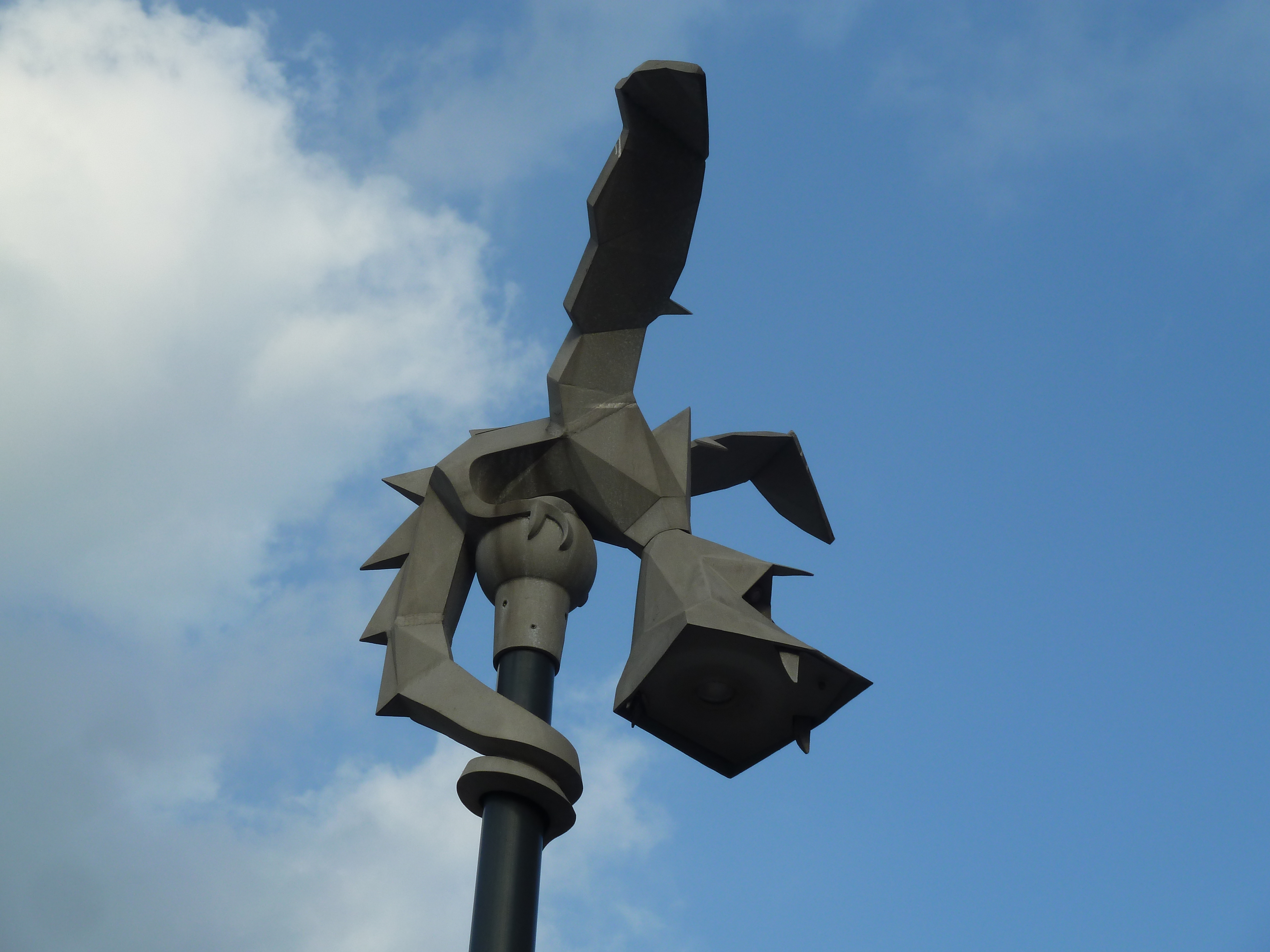
The street lights

Due to the area's attractive location on the border between Østerbro and the City Centre and near some of the most expensive addresses in Copenhagen, it was decided to redevelop the area in the late 1990s. It happened as a joint venture between Port of Copenhagen (now CPH City & Port Development) and private development companies TK Development and Sjælsø Gruppen. In 2000, Port of Copenhagen commissioned Dutch architects West 8 to draw up a masterplan for the transformation of the area. The aim of the plan is to create a dense and active urban environment with multiple functions and diverse architecture. As part of the masterplan, the new buildings all have interior courtyards that are accessible to the public, unlike those in the older parts of the city, so as to expand the street areas and create life and movement between the buildings.

The neighbourhood comprises about 50,000 em2 of renovated buildings and 95,000 em2 of new buildings distributed on 53,000 em2 of offices and buildings and about 42,000 em2 of dwellings.

== The square ==
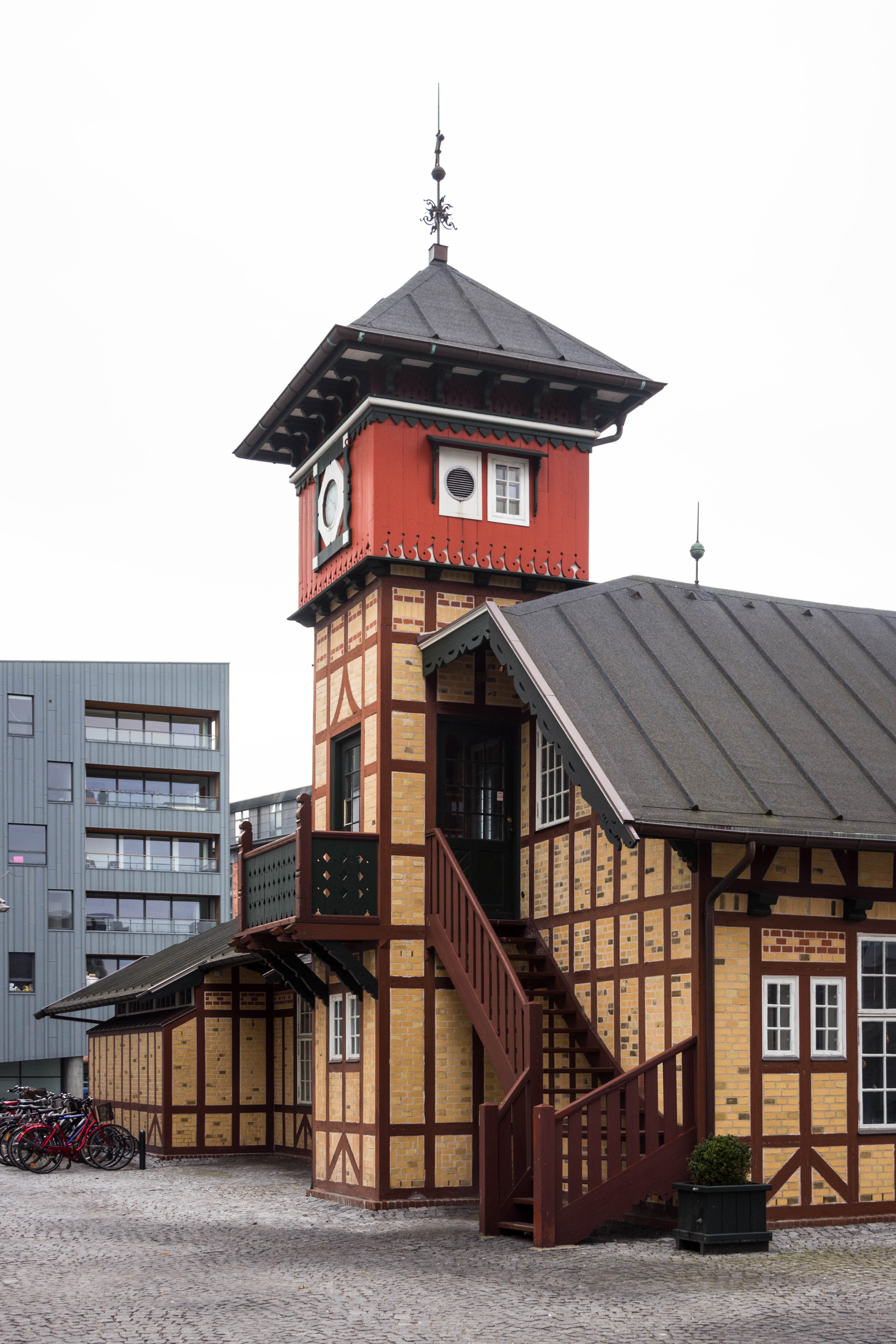
The former Free Port Station building

The square is dominated by the former Free Port Railway Station which was dismantled in 2002 and rebuilt in 2005 to serve as a café pavilion near its original location. The half-timbered National Romantic building from 1895 was designed by Heinrich Wenck, who also designed Copenhagen Central Station and numerous other railway stations around the country, and served as a hub for the Copenhagen-Malmö ferries.

== Buildings and residents ==
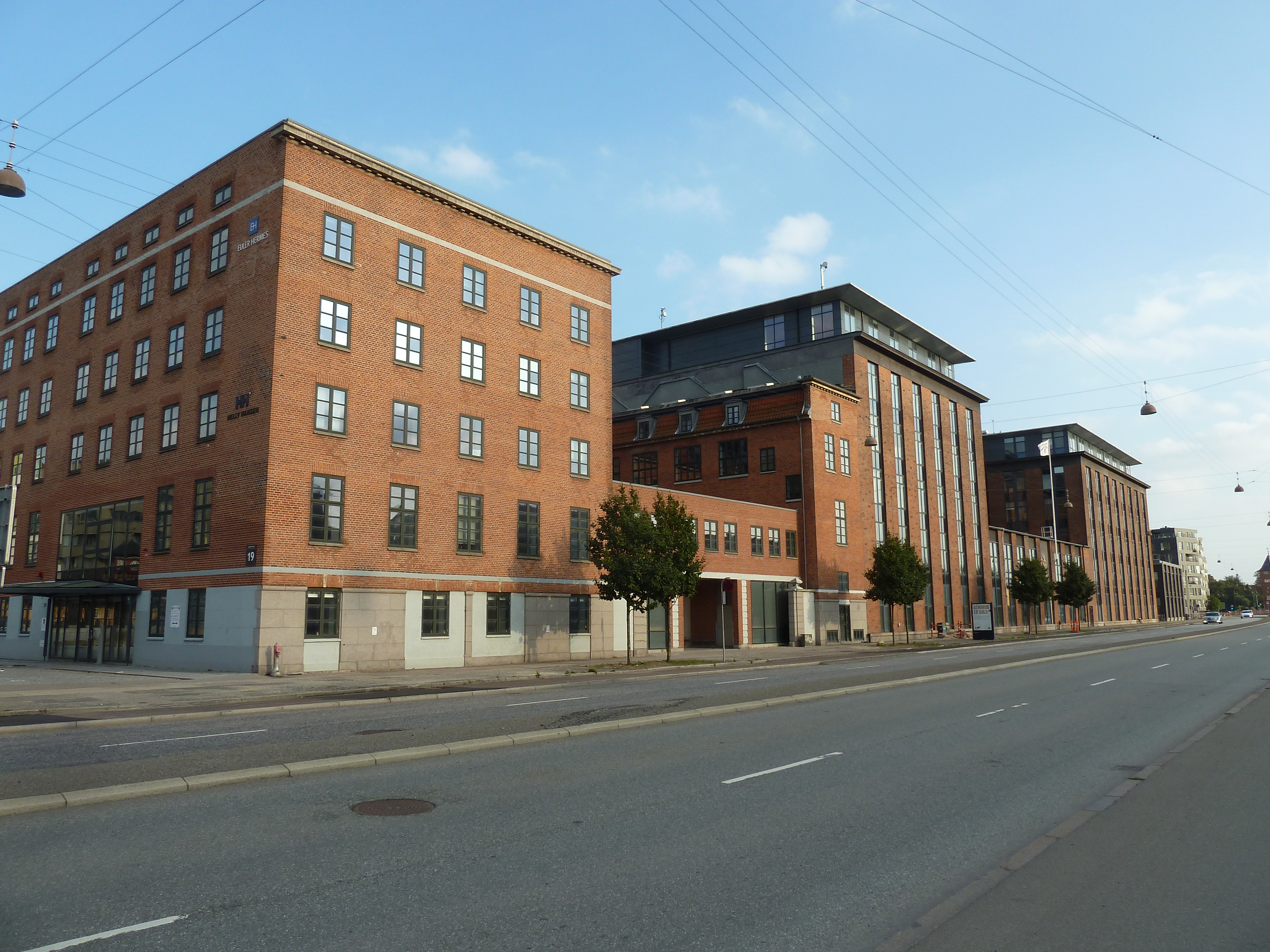
The Nordisk Fjer building

Among the older buildings in the area is the former headquarters of Nordisk Fjer which was built in 1901. It now serves as headquarters for Banedanmark. The Twin Warehouses, also known as Warehouse D and E, were built in the 1920s. Other historic buildings are found along Dampfærgevej.

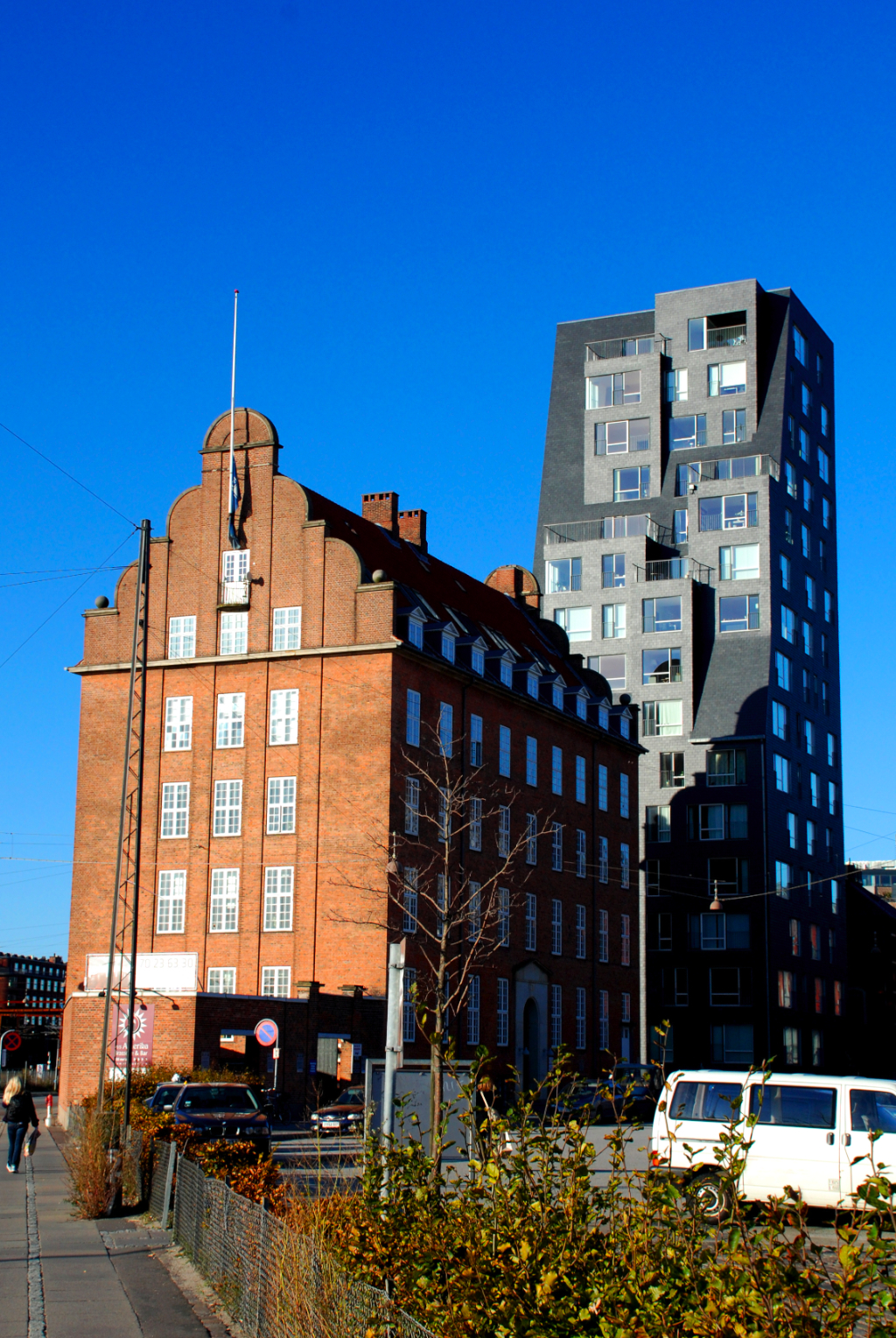
New and old: The Fyrtårnet residential tower block and an old building at the southern tip of the area

The most prominent modern buildings in the area are the Copper Tower on the north side of the area, next to the Ferry Terminal, and Fyrtårnet (en. The Lighthouse) on its south side. The Copper Tower is a 16-storey, copper-clad office building which was designed by Arkitema and built in 2004. It houses the law firm Plesner as well as an Italian supermarket in its ground floor. The Lighthouse is a residential tower block designed by Lundgaard & Tranberg and was completed in 2007. Other modern buildings in the area have been designed by C. F. Møller Architects and Hvidt & Mølgaard.

== Transport ==
Amerika Plads is located between Østerport station and Nordhavn station on the S-train main railway line through Copenhagen.
