= Urban wealth fund =

Holding company

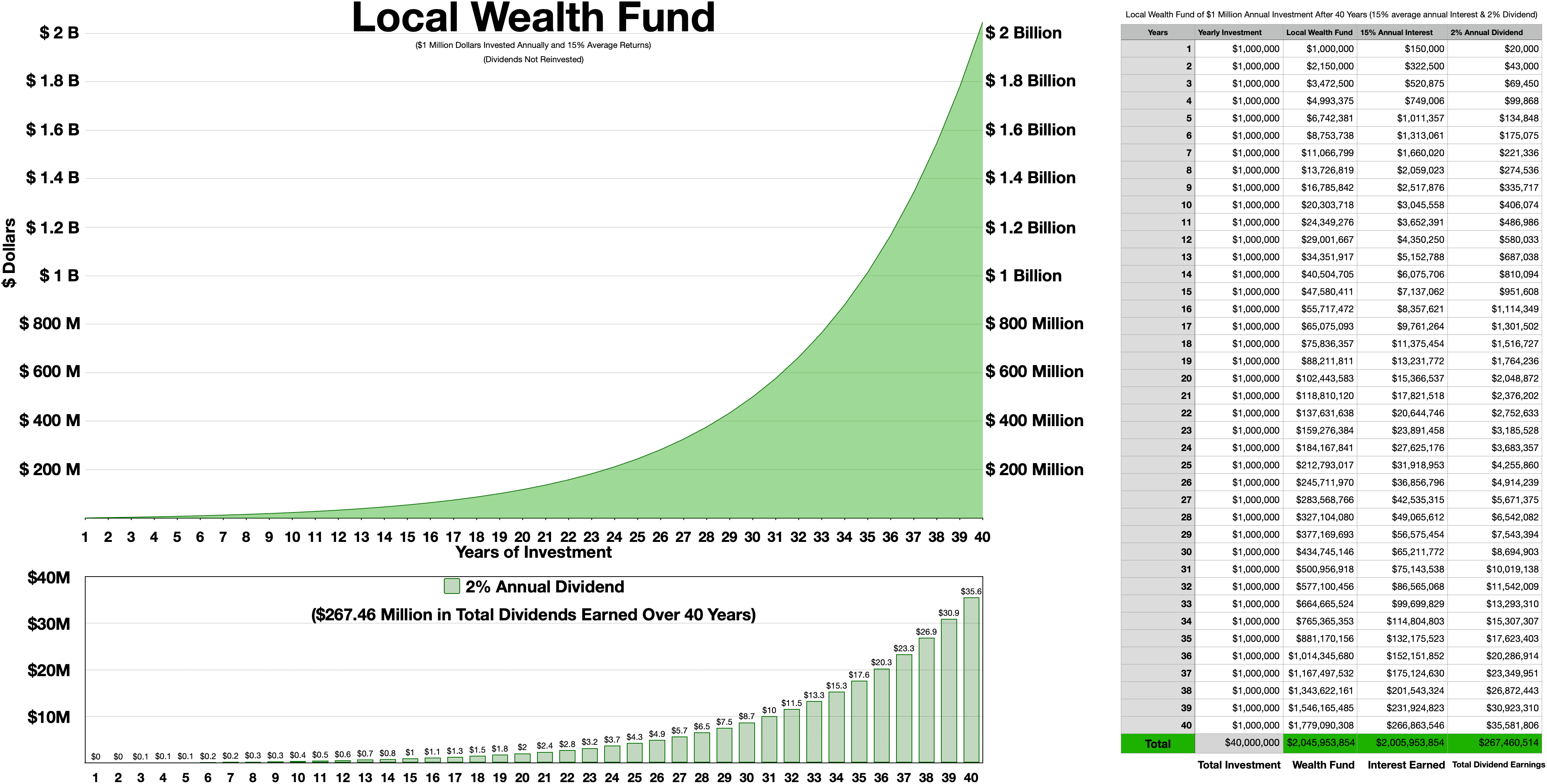
$1 million invested annually earning 15% interest and a 2% dividend. After 40 years would accumulate over $2 billion in interest earned and over $260 million in dividend income.

An Urban Wealth Fund (UWF), Local Wealth Fund, or Community investment fund is a local government-owned Public Wealth Fund, a holding company that owns, manages, and develops operational and real estate assets, mainly within its jurisdiction at the city, county or regional level of public administration. Government surpluses could also be invested in bonds, equities such as the stock market, or private equity.

Operational assets often include utilities such as water and electric utilities, transportation assets such as airports, ports, subways and other local transport operations.

The real estate segment is often the largest part in value terms as governments have been found to own at least half of the real estate market, in value terms and not seldom exceeding the economic output of the local entity. Due to the lack of proper asset registers and public sector accounting, the real estate segment is the least well understood, with considerable value hidden from being considered when formulating the budget.

The term was coined by Detter and Fölster in their book The Public Wealth of Cities. In its general idea, it is a compromise between government control and privatization, set up to manage the assets of a city, often with the objective of maximizing return on the assets as a means of generating revenue for the city government. As a result, this will enable cities to increase their investments (for example for infrastructure projects) without increasing taxes.

== General information ==
Its operation is similar to a Sovereign Wealth Fund (SWF) but on a smaller scale. A UWF has an asset manager concerned with managing a portfolio of operational assets. The assets are publicly owned by the city but administered by an independent management structure that is free from political influence and concentrates on maximization of value, which is useful for when assets are not ‘routine’ real estate such as docklands or old sport stadiums. The fair market value of assets can be difficult to determine since they may have no active market whose prices can provide effective guidance for the valuation of the property. In addition to the professional management of assets, such funds protect cities from short-sighted politically inspired measures, such as selling properties to resolve liquidity problems.

For Detter and Fölster the core idea of the Urban Wealth Fund can be summarized by 5 key points, which are simple in design but may be difficult to execute:

- Value: Local governments are still the largest holder of wealth within city borders (for example real estate, transportation systems, utilities and state owned enterprises)
- Transparency: Due to poor accounting techniques, many cities are unable to present a comprehensive list of all their assets. As a result, cities can neither manage effectively nor optimize their assets
- Return Opportunity: Even a small increase of the return on public assets would contribute significantly to the city's budget and thus decrease the need to raise taxes while also allowing for increased investments into, for example, infrastructure
- Politicians vs. public management: The clear distinction between politicians and asset management can have a salutary effect on democracy as it removes politicians from their position as asset gatekeepers and turns them into citizen advocates on behalf of public asset productivity and quality
- Mechanisms: Professional asset management is linked to stronger economic performance

Some economists and politicians advocate for the establishment of UWFs as a means of making more efficient use of city-owned assets, such as land, in order to generate revenue without necessarily resorting to tax increases or running up debts. The positive examples of Copenhagen and Hamburg suggest that the concept can be successful despite the numerous differences between the UWF structure. However, McNickle notes that there is a dearth of scholarly literature casting any sort of critical eye on UWFs.

== Examples ==
Examples for the creation of UWF can be found all over the world and include HafenCity GmbH in Hamburg, Germany, City & Port Development Corporation in Copenhagen, Denmark, MTR Corporation Limited in Hong Kong, Philadelphia Industrial Development Corporation, Philadelphia, United States and Temasek Holdings, Singapore. The individual characteristics and responsibilities of these UWFs differ significantly.

=== Copenhagen City and Port Development Corporation ===
The Copenhagen City and Port Development Corporation, fully owned by the City of Copenhagen and the state of Denmark, was created in 2007 when multiple development areas around Copenhagen (most importantly the port and Ørestad) were consolidated under one entity. CPH City and Port Development was established with the explicit purpose of using the revenues of redevelopment to finance the construction of infrastructure (especially the CPH metro line). It accomplishes this task through the use of smart valuation techniques and low-cost financing using the assets as collateral. For example, the re-evaluation of one of the biggest assets, the land of North Harbor, increased its value by €450 million. In total, the redevelopment of North Harbor led to investments of €15 billion.

Katz and Noring analysed the political, institutional and financial features of the Copenhagen model:

==== Political Features ====
- Compromise and Collaboration: Denmark, due to its small size and population, has a collaborative tradition with a very flat power hierarchy. There is a great understanding that if you want to develop something, you must collaborate.
- Decentralized Governance: The Danish System of decentralised government allows municipalities to operate independently from the national government. Denmark is the most decentralized OECD country with 60% of government spending is accounted for by local government. Motto: Whoever gets to decide on an investment, needs to finance the investment.
- Board Composition: board members are elected by the national government (2), the city of Copenhagen (4) and its employees (2)

==== Institutional Features ====
- Bundling assets by merging public companies: CPH City & Port Development was created through consolidation of pre-existing public corporations. With fragmentation, local governments lose sight of their assets and are forced to make decisions in a piecemeal fashion.
- Maximising benefits of public ownership and private management: It combines the efficiency of market discipline with the benefits of public direction and legitimacy. This model allows both sectors to focus on their core competencies. As a result, operations run faster and more efficient and allow the city to set ambitious targets.
- Insulation from political interference: Its structure ensures that the fund can run independently from political interference. It is governed by national law and operates under the mandate to optimize commercial gains in order to generate profit for the city of Copenhagen.
- Organizational structure and joint ventures: Flat organisational structure allows fast decision-making. Departments can work independently and only report to a CEO. When joint ventures are created, the power of operations is delegated even further away from the board of directors.

==== Financial features ====
- Access to cheap financing: Thanks to high credit ratings of its owners, CPH has easy access to cheap financing, “The access to cheap loans and the ability to keep operating despite massive debts is the single most important feature of CPH City & Port Development,” Koch said. “Without that, we would have shared the destiny of other property developers during the recent recession, as we are just as vulnerable to market dynamics as other property developers.”
- Long-term thinking: By acting like a private company, they have to think long-term. This prevents the public agency fallacy from selling out assets whenever the public agency lacks liquidity.
- Collaboration with Pension funds: Large Danish pension funds are important partners of CPH and share the company's long-term vision and investment horizon.

=== HafenCity Hamburg GmbH ===
Since 2004, HafenCity Hamburg GmbH is the operational corporation in charge of managing all assets and overseeing the urban redevelopment of HafenCity. The UWF is called 'Special Fund for City and Port', which consists of land owned by the City of Hamburg located in the HafenCity area (97% of all properties in HafenCity area). The redevelopment of HafenCity relies entirely on HafenCity Hamburg GmbH, which either sells properties or solicits loans from commercial banks using the assets of HafenCity as collateral. The capital is then mainly used for infrastructure and basic amenities, notably roads, bridges, squares, parks, quays, and promenades. In addition to its financial tasks, HafenCity Hamburg GmbH clears and prepares sites, acquires real estate developers and is responsible for public relations and communications.

Similar to the CPH, HafenCity Hamburg GmbH benefits from the high credit rating of the city of Hamburg. As a result, it is one of the few European megaprojects which does not receive EU funds and almost no federal budgetary support. When completed, the HafenCity development areas will become home for approx. 23,000 people and create approx. 71,000 jobs.

In comparison to CPH, HafenCity Hamburg GmbH has less responsibilities and tasks. While CPH is responsible for the construction of the whole metro system in Copenhagen, HafenCity Hamburg GmbH only finances the urban regeneration within the HafenCity area. Further, HafenCity Hamburg GmbH requires annual budgetary approval by the city of Hamburg and is not allowed to engage in joint ventures with private developers and investors. Nonetheless, both projects share one crucial characteristic: the bundling of public assets and the management of such assets through one organisation that is granted significant freedom of operation in the market economy. This ensures that the long-term plans are not endangered by political shifts in local government and that the corporation has the needed agility to operate in market economies.

=== MTR Corporation Limited ===
MTR Corporation Limited (originally, Mass Transit Railway Corporation) was established in 1975 and tasked with managing and operating the rail transit system, the adjacent land and most of the adjacent real estate. In 2000, MTR was partially privatised. While the railway system itself is profitable, most MTR's profits derive from property development and other commercial activities, such as leasing of retail space or personal telecommunication services. As a result, MTR pays a substantial dividend to the city, which has been used to pay off existing debt and to develop other assets. Similar to CPH in Copenhagen, the UWF is used to ensure high quality public transport, while also increasing the living standard in Hong Kong.

== Critics ==
As the concept of UWF is relatively new, McNickle notes that there is a dearth of scholarly literature casting any sort of critical eye on UWFs. He argues that the UWF structure is too complicated and local governments are better off selling assets and outsourcing services, keeping the government as small as possible.

== See also ==
- Sovereign wealth fund
- Public–private partnership
- Infrastructure asset management
- U.S. Strategic Bitcoin Reserve
- Texas Strategic Bitcoin Reserve
