= Fölster =

Fölster is a surname. Notable people with the surname include:

- Sofia Fölster (born 1991), Swedish politician
- Stefan Fölster (born 1959), Swedish economist and author
- Tobias Fölster (born 1994), German footballer

== See also ==
- Jean Folster (1922 – 26 December 1994), Canadian community worker and the first woman to become the chief of the Norway House Cree Nation
- William Folster (1894–1954), Australian politician
