= Kyiv School of Economics =

Private university in Kyiv, Ukraine

The Kyiv School of Economics
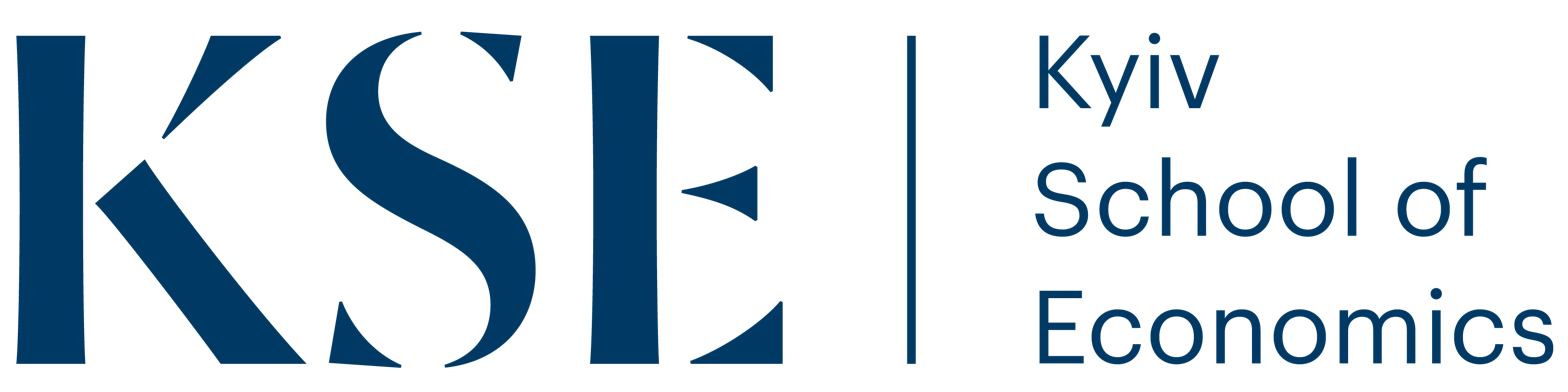
- the Kyiv School of Economics
- Motto: Let's build your future together!
- Type: Private university
- Established: 1996
- Accreditation: Ministry of Education and Science of Ukraine
- Chairman: KSE is governed by the Board of Directors and Management Team.
- Location: Kyiv, Ukraine
- Colours: Blue, white, light-blue, red, green, yellow
- Website: kse.ua

The Kyiv School of Economics (KSE) is an undergraduate and graduate school of economics and management in Kyiv, Ukraine, founded in 1996 by the Economics Education and Research Consortium (EERC) and the Eurasia Foundation. KSE has an agreement with the University of Houston (UH) in the United States which permits it to grant graduates an MA in economics in their name as well. KSE programs are taught by faculty who earned PhDs in US and European Union universities. Former Minister of Economy Tymofiy Mylovanov served as the school's president.

The school's stated mission is to "build the intellectual foundation for a strong and innovative economy of Ukraine". As of 2025, the school had graduated over 700 alumni, with more than 130 earning PhDs from Western universities. Since September 2026, KSE Graduate Business School has been presided over by Yulia Svyrydenko, former Prime Minister of Ukraine.

== Curriculum and management ==
The curriculum of the program is modeled on economic and financial programs in North America and Western Europe with English-language textbooks and access to modern world economic and scientific resources. Students have access to JSTOR and EBSCOHOST subscription scholarly archives. By arrangement, students of economic programs that have a grade "B" or higher at the end of the study, may also hold a degree from the University of Houston (USA), in addition to the KSE Diploma.

Top-performing students receive tuition discounts and opportunities to serve as teaching assistants in their second year.

In addition to degree programs, the university has two centers:

- Centre for Economic Journalism, directed by Andrii Ianitskyi.
- Centre of Excellence in Procurement

KSE is governed by its board of directors, which bears legal and fiduciary responsibility for the whole organization and oversees its activities. The board of directors is chaired by Yegor Grygorenko (KSE EERC 2001); the International Academic Board is chaired by Yurii Gorodnichenko. The board includes several senior representatives of Western donor organizations and Ukrainian corporations. Members of the board meet every year and discuss successes and challenges in the KSE development.

The academic quality of the KSE MA Program is continuously overseen by the International Academic Board chaired Yurii Gorodnichenko, University of California, Berkeley, US. The head of IAB is also the member of the board of directors. One of the members of IAB is Roger Myerson. He was awarded the 2007 Nobel Memorial Prize in Economic Sciences in recognition of his contributions to mechanism design theory, which analyzes rules for coordinating economic agents efficiently when they have different information and difficulty trusting each other.

== Degree programs ==
=== Bachelor's program ===
- Bachelor's Program in Economics and Business (in cooperation with SSE Riga)
- Bachelor's Program in IT and Business Analytics
- Bachelor's Program in Economics and Big Data
- Bachelor's Program in Law
- Bachelor's Program in Psychology

=== Master's programs ===
Three KSE Master's Programs are accredited by the Ministry of Education and Science of Ukraine: those in Economics Analysis, Business and Financial Economics, and Public Policy and Governance. The university also offers a Master's in Mathematical Economics and Econometrics.

=== MBA ===
Master of Business Administration

MBA for State-Owned Enterprises

Master of Business and Management in Artificial Intelligence and Data Analytics (MBAI+MBA)

=== PhD ===
PhD in Agri Food Economics

== Response to the Russo-Ukrainian War ==
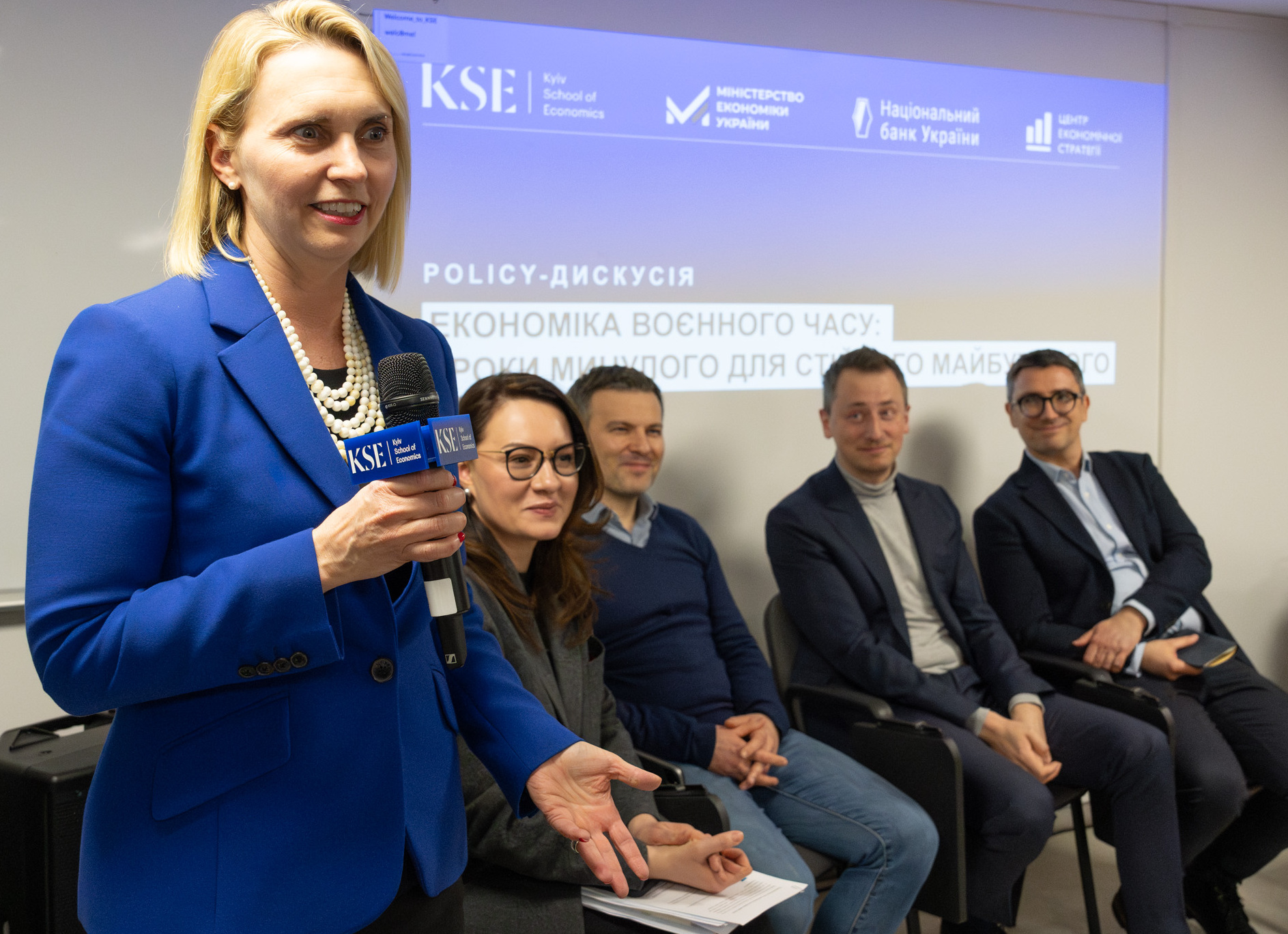
US Ambassador Bridget Brink speaking at the KSE Forum on 25 March 2024. Sitting next to her is then-Minister of Economy Yulia Svyrydenko, who has been Prime Minister of Ukraine since July 2025.

=== Ukraine Humanitarian Relief Campaign by KSE ===
From the very beginning of the war, KSE launched an international fundraising campaign aimed at Ukraine humanitarian relief.

The KSETeam collects contributions, purchases, and coordinates all logistics for the delivery of first aid kits and protective kits. Individuals and business all over the world support the campaign. Substantial donations made such companies as Jefferies, Ripple, PUMB, Kernel, УкрНафтоБуріння, U.COMMODITIES.

The campaign covers the following streams:

- Medical supplies (primarily, ambulance kits with stop-bleed items)
- Protective kits
- Food and water for civilians

As of March 21, 2022, KSE has already raised more than $11.8 million for:

- 15400 first aid kits and prepay 20000 more
- 25000 tourniquets,
- 6350 safety vests,
- 3000 plates for locally produced vests and have available funding to secure additional 5000+,
- 5140 helmets,
- other supplies (e.g. fabric for vests production, food supplies for cities under shelling).

Among 18 batches in total, 6 are already delivered to Ukraine, 6 are on the way, 3 are being compiled for delivery and 3 have issues or had to be cancelled. Batches with issues are being resolved with the involvement of embassies when needed.

First batches with 5000 of aid kits are already going to Sumy, Kharkiv, Chernihiv, Mykolaiv. 500 completed bulletproof vests have already been delivered to Kharkiv. These bulletproof vests have plates of the 4th highest class. Also, the fund has already purchased an additional nearly 5,000 bulletproof vests to arrive in Ukraine next week.

Current demand for medical kits in Ukraine is 307,000 units. KSE procurement team follows closely the specifications of the benchmark kit, provided by the Ministry of Health of Ukraine, which is used by the Ukrainian armed forces in their emergency training. KSE is also working in close cooperation to get approval from the Ministry of Health on any deviations and analogues provided by suppliers.

In response to the 2022 Russian invasion, KSE launched a humanitarian relief campaign raising millions for medical supplies and protective equipment.

=== Military economy ===
During the war KSE supports the Ukrainian government. KSE analysts assess the losses the effect of sanctions against Russia and develop economic post-war recovery scenarios.

Together with the Office of the President of Ukraine and the Ministry of Economy, KSE launched the Russia Will Pay project. Its purpose is to gather information about objects that have been destroyed and continue to be destroyed as a result of the war. This information will be used by the Ukrainian government as evidence in international courts to compensate Ukraine for the damage.

=== Scientific diplomacy ===
KSE launched a cultural diplomacy project called Global Minds 4 Ukraine. These are the public lectures with top world intellectuals to demonstrate solidarity with Ukraine and enhance Ukrainian intellectual sovereignty. The outstanding scientists, scholars, and Nobel prize winners have already supported Ukraine, including Nassim Nicholas Taleb, Michael A. McFaul, Paul Krugman, David Howell Petraeus, Sander van der Linden, Jason Stanley, Timothy Snyder, and Nicolas Cristakis.

=== Leave Russia project ===
In July 2022, Kyiv School of Economics announced the launch of Leave Russia, an online database of world companies and brands showing their response to the international trade boycott of Russia in the aftermath of the Russian invasion of Ukraine. The database was compiled jointly with Ukrainian IT volunteers. It is presented as "the most complete and actual list of top companies and world-famous brands that have closed their business in Russia or continue to work in this market". As of August 2023, the database lists over 3,400 companies of which over 1,410 are listed as continuing operation in Russia and over 758 as either having withdrawn or completely exited Russia.

In October 2024, the KSE reported that out of 3988 examined businesses, just over 1700 were continuing operations in Russia; almost 600 companies were in the process of leaving Russia or had ceased their activities in Russia; and 427 companies had completely departed from Russia. The remaining c. 1250 companies had temporarily ceased certain activities, or closed down several departments. According to the Kyiv School, the number of companies schaling down their activities or preparing a complete withdrawal from Russia was still increasing, albeit slowly.

== Student life ==
Students at the Kyiv School of Economics participate in monthly meetings with the management team, where representatives from all long-term programs contribute to shaping the school's agenda. Student organizations include the Finance Club, which hosts lectures by industry professionals, the Case Club, focused on case-solving and career development in finance, and the Business Literature Club, which discusses business books. The school organizes student competitions such as Case Champ, a case-solving event in partnership with firms like KPMG and Bain & Company, Chess Champ, and KSE BrainChamp, an olympiad in quantitative economics. In autumn 2017, a student tournament modeled on the intellectual quiz "What? Where? When?" was introduced.

== Events ==
The Kyiv School of Economics hosts open lectures for the public. Past speakers include Oleg Ivantsov (editor in chief of Liga.net), Dag Detter, author of the book The Public Wealth of Nations, Aivaras Abromavichus, Minister of Economic Development and Trade of Ukraine (2014–2016), Dita Charanzova, member of the European Parliament, and other.

In 2018, KSE held Ukraine Economy Week twice. In May – jointly with the National Bank of Ukraine. In September – together with the company ICU. Also KSE has started to publish yearly reforms overview – White Book on Reforms.
