= Copenhagen Malmö Port =

Location
- Country: Denmark and Sweden
- Location: Copenhagen and Malmö

Details
- Opened: 2001
- Chief Executive Officer: Barbara Scheel Agersnap

Statistics
- Website cmport.com

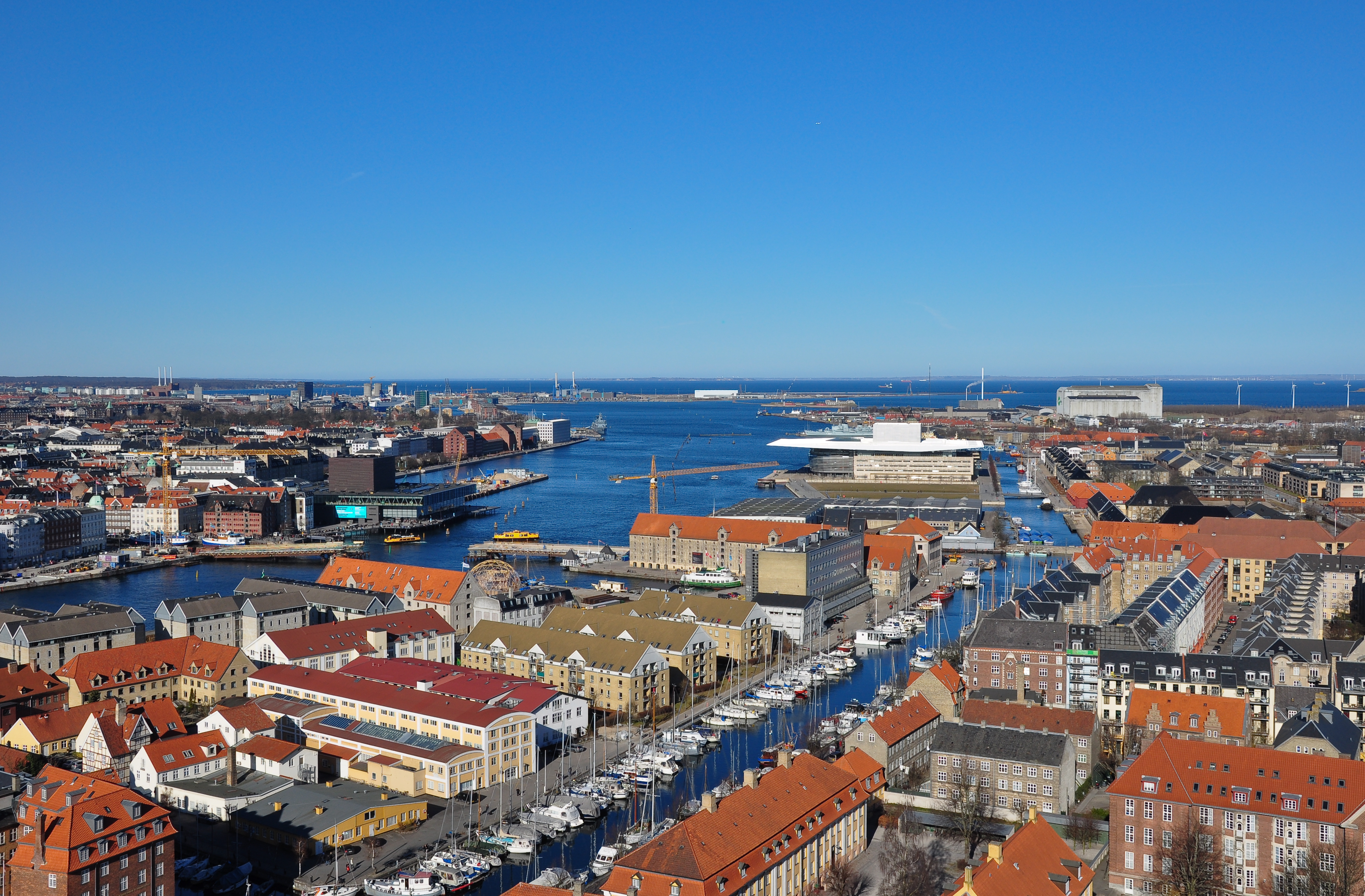
Port of Copenhagen seen from the spire of Our Saviour's Church, March 2013

Copenhagen Malmö Port AB (CMP) operates the ports in Denmark's capital Copenhagen and in Sweden's third largest city, Malmö. The ports are located either side of Øresund, a strait between the two countries. The combined Øresund Region is the Nordic countries' largest metropolitan area in terms of population. The region is connected by the Øresund Bridge, which spans the strait at its southern end, and the HH Ferry route between Helsingør, Denmark and Helsingborg, Sweden.

Most ships en route between the Baltic Sea and the North Sea/Atlantic pass through the ports, making the Øresund one of the world's busiest sounds.

== Regional hub ==
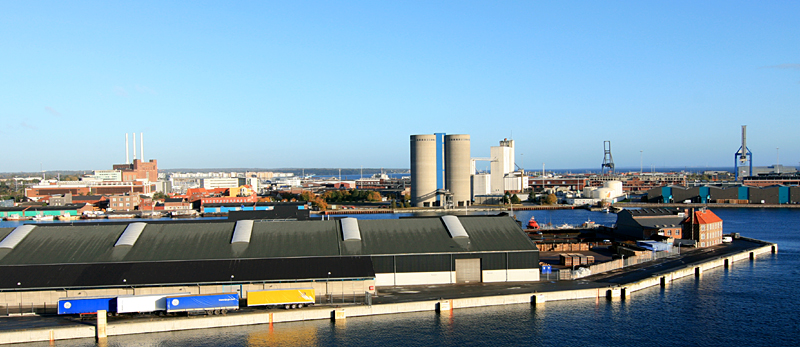
Nordhavnen, Copenhagen

The central location in the Øresund Region means that in a number of cases CMP acts as a hub for freight that is transported onward to the Baltic States, Russia and other parts of Northern Europe. In addition, CMP is a hub for intermediate storage of crude oil in the trade between Russia and countries including Australia and United States.

CMP is located in the heart of the Øresund Region with almost four million consumers. The region is experiencing increasing integration between the Danish and Swedish areas. At the same time, the Region is the gateway to the entire Baltic Region with more than 100 million consumers. The Baltic Sea is one of the oldest and busiest trade routes, accounting for some 15% of the world's maritime transportation.

== Background, history ==
Copenhagen Malmö Port is a Nordic company based in two countries – Sweden and Denmark. The company is owned by the By & Havn I/S Development Corporation (50%), Malmö City (27%) and private investors (23%). CMP is a Swedish-registered limited liability company (Aktiebolag).

CMP was formed through a merger of Copenhagen Port and Malmö Port – two operations with a port and maritime history extending back to the Middle Ages. The merger took place in 2001, when the 16 kilometre long Öresund Bridge between Copenhagen and Malmö was completed and the task of integrating the Öresund Region got underway.

== Current operations ==
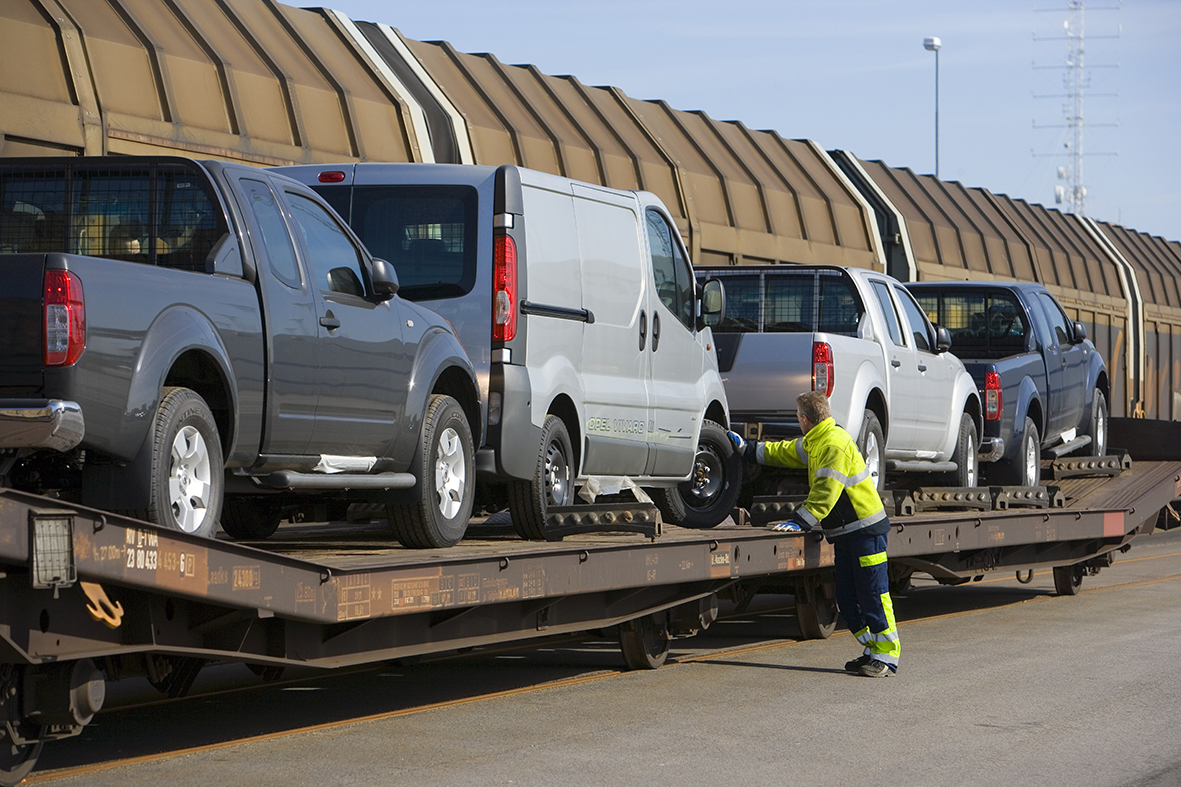
Loading cars onto a train in Malmö

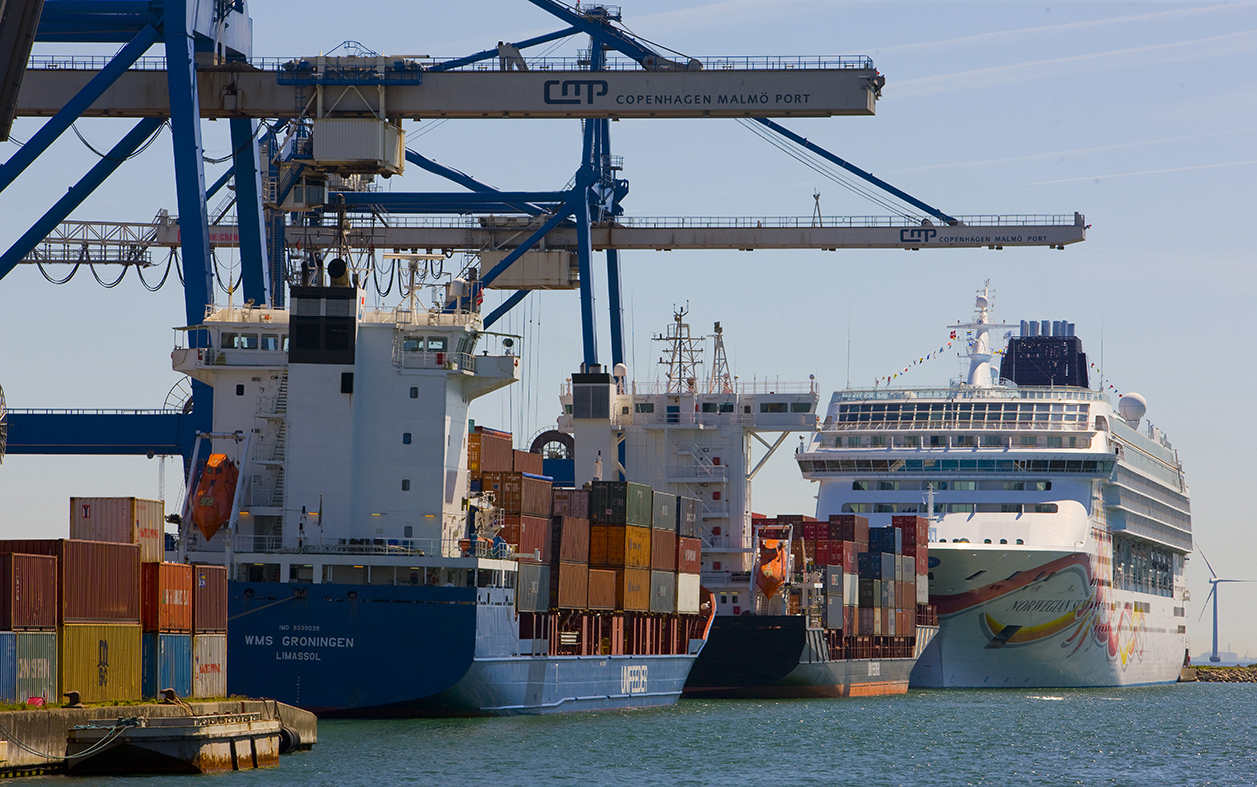
Loading of container ship in Copenhagen

CMP is one of Scandinavia's largest port operators, handling more than 15.1 million tonnes of freight in 2018. This is down from 15.6 million tonnes in 2017.

CMP provides access to an infrastructure that ensures goods are processed quickly and safely. Operations include roll-on/roll-off – and container traffic, cruises, combi-traffic via rail, and oil and dry bulk terminals. CMP receives ships of all sizes and handles all types of freight, including consumer goods, grain, liquid bulk, cars, scrap metal and building materials. In its role as port operator, CMP unloads, loads and stores goods, but also works with different logistics services via road and rail.

Every year the ports in Copenhagen and Malmö receive about 4,500 ships. CMP is the Nordic region's largest car port, handling almost 303,000 cars during 2018. CMP has six car terminals covering a total of 800,000 square metres (8,600,000 sq ft) and four PDI centres to service them.

Copenhagen is one of Europe's largest cruise destinations, that received around 953,000 passengers from 150 different countries in 2018. In recent years, both Copenhagen and CMP have received awards for their cruise operations: for example, winning "Europe's Leading Cruise Port", and "Best Turnaround Port Operations".

Ferry and passenger services are also operated in both Copenhagen and Malmö. The major route is Copenhagen-Oslo and the other ferry line runs between Malmö and the German port of Travemünde. During 2018, the number of passengers amounted to around 879,000.

== Investments ==
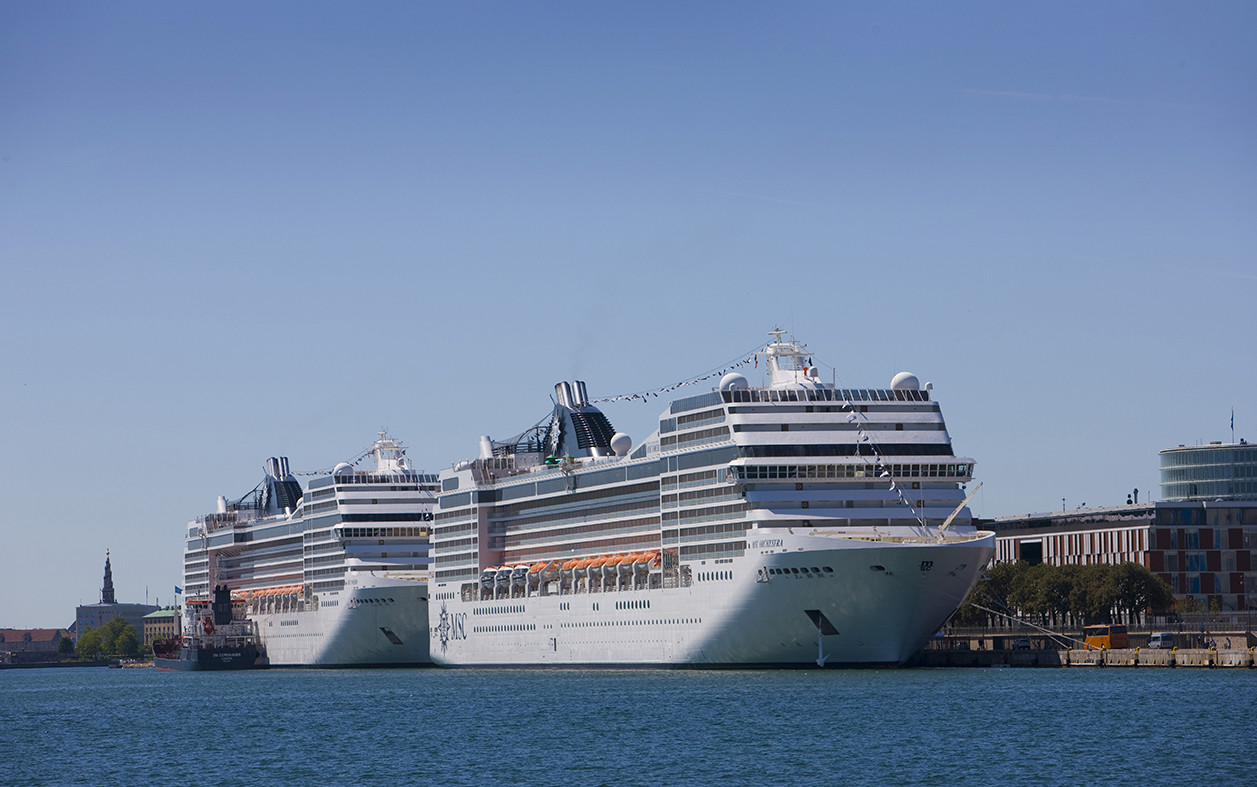
Cruise liners in Copenhagen

Approximately SEK 2.5 billion has been invested in new logistics and infrastructure solutions in Copenhagen and Malmö between 2010 and 2014. The investments are in freight and passenger terminals, quay installations and machinery, cranes and other infrastructure.

The largest project is Norra Hamnen (Northern Harbour) in Malmö, which was opened in autumn 2011. Three terminals have been built, quintupling CMP's freight capacity. The expansion is one of the largest infrastructure projects ever completed in the city, covering an area of 250,000 square metres. In the next stage, Malmö City and CMP will be jointly establishing Malmö Industrial Park – a new industrial estate where companies within areas including manufacturing, processing and logistics services can establish themselves. The area is expected to be fully developed in the mid-2020s, at which time it will extend over 900,000 square metres.

Another major project is the new cruise quay in Copenhagen which was opened in May 2014. The quay is 1,100 meters long and has three terminal buildings. Thus, CMP can receive three cruise ships simultaneously and handle up to 500 calls from ships per year.

In 2016, work began on a new cruise terminal in Visby, which was opened in April 2018.

In conjunction with Copenhagen Municipality and Malmö Municipality, investments are also being made in access roads and other infrastructure in connection to the ports. Further investments are also being planned in Malmö – which is the largest rail hub in Southern Sweden – in railway traffic in order to provide even more capacity.

== See also ==
- Ports of the Baltic Sea
- Port of Copenhagen
- Kockums Naval Solutions
- Maersk
