= M'Changama =

M'Changama or Mchangama is a surname of Comorian origin. Notable people with the surname include:

- Jacob Mchangama (born 1978), Danish human rights lawyer
- Mohamed M'Changama (born 1987), Comorian footballer
- Youssouf M'Changama (born 1990), Comorian footballer
