= The Public Wealth of Cities =

Non-fiction book by Dag Detter and Stefan Fölster

The Public Wealth of Cities: How to Unlock Hidden Assets to Boost Growth and Prosperity
- Authors: Dag Detter and Stefan Fölster
- Language: English
- Subject: Public Finance, Public Policy
- Genre: Nonfiction
- Publisher: Brookings
- Publication date: July 18, 2017
- Publication place: USA, Sweden
- Media type: Hardcover, Audiobook, Amazon Kindle
- Pages: 271

The Public Wealth of Cities: How to Unlock Hidden Assets to Boost Growth and Prosperity (Brookings, 2017) is a non-fiction book, co-authored by Dag Detter and Stefan Fölster, the authors that wrote The Public Wealth of Nations, a book that both The Economist and the Financial Times listed among the best book of the year in 2015.

In The Public Wealth of Cities, they are focusing on the urban situation and why cities develop differently, with some succeeding in the accumulation of prosperity, while others failing. The book is filled with case studies and offers some practical hands-on suggestions.
