= Sofia Fölster =

Swedish politician (born 1991)

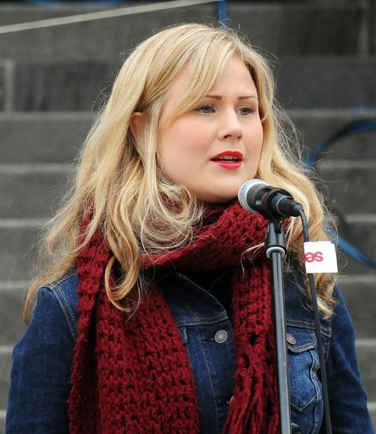

member of the Riksdag
- In office 2014–2018

first vice president of the MUF
- In office 2016–2018

Personal details
- Political party: Moderate Party
- Parent: Stefan Fölster (father)

Sofia Catharina Margarita Fölster (born 17 December 1991) is a Swedish politician for the Moderate Party, and member of the Riksdag from 2014 to 2018. She was the first vice president of the Moderate Party youth group (MUF) from 2016 to 2018. Her father is author Stefan Fölster.
