= Ørestad Development Corporation =

Former urban redevelopment company in Southern Copenhagen, Denmark

The Ørestad Development Corporation (Danish: Ørestadsselskabet I/S) was a company responsible for urban redevelopment of Ørestad south of Copenhagen, Denmark. The company was authorized by the Ørestad Act passed in 1992, and was established in 1993, co-owned by the Copenhagen Municipality (55%) and the Ministry of Finance (45%). It was also responsible for building parts of the Copenhagen Metro. The company was dissolved in 2007. Its Metro-related activities were taken over by the Metro Corporation (Danish: Metroselskabet), a newly formed company that consolidated ownership and operation of the Copenhagen Metro. Its redevelopment-related activities were merged into the Area Development Corporation (Danish: Arealudviklingsselskabet).
