= Jacob Mchangama =

Danish lawyer and human-rights advocate (born 1978)

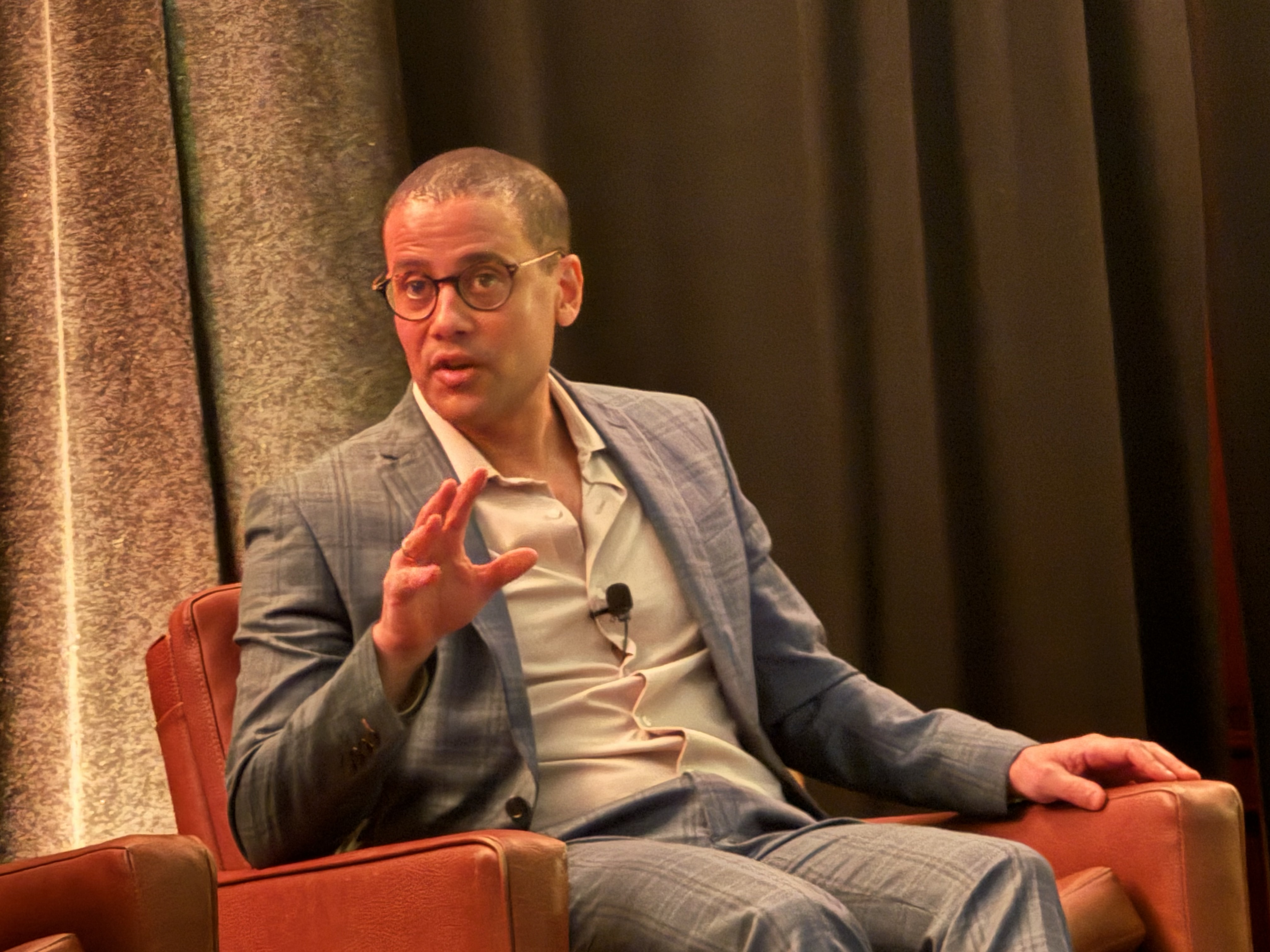
Jacob Mchangama in 2025

Jacob Jomo Danstrøm Mchangama (born 15 February 1978) is a Danish lawyer, human-rights advocate, global expert on free speech, and social commentator. He is the founder and director of Justitia, a Copenhagen-based think tank focusing on human rights, freedom of speech, and the rule of law. For six years, he served as chief legal counsel at CEPOS.

== Personal life ==
Mchangama's mother, Ulla Danstrøm, is Danish. His father, Said Mchangama, is from Comoros. In 2016, he married his longtime partner, Sarah Hammeken. They have two children, a son and a daughter.

== Education and career ==
In 2003, Mchangama received a law degree from the University of Copenhagen. In 2004, after studying in Venice and Strasbourg, he received an additional degree from the European Inter-University Centre for Human Rights and Democratisation.

He was an assistant professor in international human rights at the University of Copenhagen from 2005 to 2007 and an adjunct professor there from 2007 to 2012.

From 2004 to 2007, he was a paralegal at Eversheds Sutherland. From 2007 to 2008, he was an attorney at the law firm Plesner. From 2008 to 2014, he was the chief legal counsel at CEPOS. He founded Justitia in 2014 and has been its director since then.

In 2022, he joined Vanderbilt University as a research professor of political science.

== Writing and speaking ==
Mchangama's writings have appeared in many publications, including the Danish newspapers Dagbladet Information and Berlingske, the Norwegian periodical Minerva, and the American journals National Review and Foreign Affairs. He has written on such subjects as the oppression of women in Islam, the 2015–16 New Year's Eve sexual assaults in Germany, and the danger of laws against "hate speech", blasphemy, and Quran-burning.

In August 2011, he contended that the European left was using the recent mass murders in Norway "to argue for limiting free speech" because certain speech "can lead to murder". Mchangama strongly challenged this premise.

In a February 2012 article, he maintained that "the combination of a debt crisis, an aging population addicted to public welfare benefits, one and a half decades of low growth rates, and increasing competition...is revealing the dark underbelly of welfarism" in Denmark. "It is not an overstatement", he claimed, "to say that the balance between the state and the individual has been shifted decisively in favor of the state". According to Mchangama, because of a growing need for higher tax income, the Danish government was now harassing citizens in ways that violated their rights and was dangerously skewing "the balance between public welfare and the free market...in favour of the former", thus revealing the tendency of the welfare state to eat away at "the capitalist foundation which sustains it" and the fact that welfare ultimately "comes not only at the expense of economic freedom but also individual freedom and choice".

In March 2013, Mchangama dismissed the "putative consensus" surrounding UN Human Rights Council Resolution 16/18, which was seen as resolving divisions between free-speech advocates and those who would criminalize defamation of religion, as a "charade". While the US saw the resolution as affirming First Amendment-style speech rights, Pakistan saw it as permitting "advocacy of religious hatred". In the middle sat Europeans, who, Mchangama noted, were often eager to defend Islam from criticism. While praising the US for "standing firm on the need to counter intolerance and hatred through debate rather than censorship", Mchangama called on the US to vigorously confront other interpretations of R 16/18.

In a February 2015 National Review essay on the 26th anniversary of the fatwa against Salman Rushdie, Mchangama criticized the widespread notion that "free speech should not be 'abused' to insult the religious convictions of minorities" and cited a recent declaration by President Barack Obama that when "we defend the legal right of a person to insult another's religion, we're equally obligated to use our free speech to condemn such insults". Mchangama challenged this view, pointing to a recent London protest by Muslims who "were perfectly happy to exercise their right to free speech and association" but whose "core message was that those very rights should be denied to those with whom they disagree, and that insult to religious feelings is a kind of extremism not too dissimilar from that of the murder of cartoonists".

In a 2 March 2015 Wall Street Journal op-ed, Mchangama lamented the "long-running pattern" in Europe of bending to Islamist "outrage" instead of defending free speech for all. He noted with dismay that Denmark's current prime minister, Helle Thorning Schmidt, had demanded in 2006 that then-prime minister Anders Fogh Rasmussen distance himself from the Jyllands-Posten cartoons, that the Danish newspaper Politiken had agreed to a 2010 settlement in which it apologized for offending Muslims by reprinting Muhammad cartoons, and that Denmark's former minister of foreign affairs, Uffe Ellemann Jensen, had expressed no sympathy for cartoonist Lars Vilks after an attempt on his life, even saying that Vilks "had asked and begged to be attacked". Mchangama warned against the rise of "offense creep", whereby jihadists were being permitted to limit debate, and urged the democratic Western world to push back.

In a 24 April 2017 op-ed for The Washington Post, Mchangama called for Denmark to end its law banning blasphemy. He noted that, while Denmark ranked first in the 2016 "Rule of Law Index", the country shared a ban on blasphemy similar to that of countries like Iran and Pakistan.

Index on Censorship's publication featured a guest commentary by Mchangama in 2017. He criticized Denmark's blasphemy law, noting that "Denmark is turning towards a model of militant democracy where free speech is often seen as the problem rather than the solution, and as a hindrance rather than the foundation of social peace."

In December 2018, Mchangama reacted with alarm about the proposal by President Donald Trump that news and entertainment critical of him "should be tested in the courts". He wrote that "Trump's constant attacks against the media may be eroding the very popular support" for the legal protection of free speech.

At the 2011 Oslo Freedom Forum, Mchangama gave an address titled "The West's attack on free speech".

In 2018, he was a guest on the podcast The Fifth Column.

In October 2018, Spiked On-line interviewed Mchangama, as his organization was instrumental in having the blasphemy law of Ireland abolished by public referendum. Mchangama explained his motivation for focusing on freedom of speech:

I grew up in one of the most liberal, tolerant societies in the world: Denmark. No one ever considered free speech to be a matter of debate because it was just as natural as breathing the air. And then we had the cartoon crisis, which served as a wake-up call for me. It has shaped both my interest in and understanding of free speech, not only because it was such a dramatic event but also because it dawned on me how vulnerable free speech is.

In 2019, he participated in a panel discussion at New York University titled "Hate speech on social media: is there a way to a more civil discussion?"

Also that year, he delivered a presentation in London on the history of free speech at Living Freedom, sponsored by Battle of Ideas.

In February 2022, Basic Books published Mchangama's book Free Speech: A History from Socrates to Social Media.

== Clear and Present Danger podcast ==
From February 2018 to February 2020, Mchangama wrote and narrated a 40-episode podcast, Clear and Present Danger: A History of Free Speech. Among those who lauded the show was psychologist Steven Pinker, who wrote, "We mustn't allow free speech to fade into a feel-good slogan. It is an unintuitive principle with a rationale that many don't appreciate and a history that many are unaware of. Mchangama's lucid history of free speech fills that gap and deepens our understanding of this precious concept." Author Jonathan Rauch said, "Free speech is the most successful social policy ever — and also the most counterintuitive. Jacob Mchangama's delightful podcast series paints vivid portraits of the lives, ideas, and struggles of the people who brought this improbable principle to life." In a review, podcast critic Elena Fernández Collins wrote approvingly: "Mchangama is an excellent historical guide, clear and precise, and with the right sense of drama when needed even though the [podcast] has a practical focus rather than a theological or philosophical one. Interspersed throughout are expert opinion episodes, where Mchangama's talent at guiding questions leads to a vibrant, insightful talk on a particular aspect of free speech."

== Honors and awards ==
Mchangama received the 2013 Freedom Prize from the Danish political party Venstre for his involvement in the public debate about rights in Denmark and abroad. In his acceptance speech, Mchangama underscored that freedom and democracy do not come naturally; they need to be fought for as hard in a country like Denmark as in any other part of the world: "No one has won freedom by being silent", he declared. He has also received the 2015 Jyllands-Posten Free Speech Award and the 2017 Blixen Award for contributing to freedom of expression. In 2019, he received the Hoerups Debatpris from Politikken.
