= Public wealth fund =

A public wealth fund (PWF) is a centralised government ownership vehicle structured as a holding company that owns, manages and develops operational and real estate assets, based mainly within its jurisdiction. A public wealth fund at the national level is often called a national wealth fund. Examples include Temasek in Singapore, Solidium in Finland, ÖBAG in Austria, LCR in the United Kingdom, as well as Vasakronan and Jernhusen in Sweden.

A public wealth fund at the local level is characterized as a local wealth fund. Examples include Copenhagen By and Havn, Hamburg Hafen City, as well as Stockholms Stadshus AB in Sweden and MTRC in Hong Kong.

Operational assets often include utilities like water and electric utilities, transportation assets such as airports, ports, subways, railways and other transport operations. Exploration and production of natural resources, such as oil, gas and minerals, as well as manufacturing and service enterprise, including financial institutions are also included in some economies.

Real estate is often the largest segment in value terms as governments have been found to control at least half of the real estate market in its jurisdiction, with a value not rarely exceeding the economic output of the geographic entity. Due to the lack of proper asset registers and public sector accounting, the real estate segment is the least well understood, with considerable value hidden from being considered when formulating the government budget.

== Public wealth fund versus sovereign wealth fund ==
A sovereign wealth fund and a public wealth fund differ in scope, purpose and objective. A sovereign wealth fund is a state-owned investment fund that invests in real and financial assets such as stocks, bonds, real estate, precious metals, or in alternative investments like private equity funds or hedge funds. Most SWFs are funded by revenues from commodity exports or from foreign-exchange reserves held by the central bank. Sovereign wealth funds invest mainly globally outside of its own economy, in order to avoid the exchange rate difficulties often called the Dutch diseases.

A PWF is a holding company concerned with active management and the development of a portfolio of operational and real estate assets, mainly based and active in the local market.

Public wealth funds and their objectives continue to evolve. Recently, public AI wealth funds have been proposed as a way to level the playing field and ensure that the public which pays for the externalities of AI also benefits from its returns.
