= 2016 Bitfinex hack =

Cryptocurrency theft

The Bitfinex cryptocurrency exchange was hacked in August 2016. 119,756 bitcoins, worth about US$72 million at the time, were stolen.

In February 2022, the US government recovered and seized a portion of the stolen bitcoin, then worth US$3.6 billion, by decrypting a file owned by Ilya Lichtenstein (born 1989) that contained addresses and private keys associated with the stolen funds. Lichtenstein and his wife, Heather R. Morgan (born 1991), were charged with conspiracy to launder the stolen bitcoin. In August 2023, Lichtenstein admitted to committing the theft. Both Lichtenstein and Morgan pleaded guilty to money laundering.

In November 2024, Lichtenstein was sentenced to five years in a US prison for his involvement in money laundering the stolen bitcoin. Morgan was sentenced to 18 months in prison for fraud and conspiracy charges.

== Hack ==
In August 2016, the Bitfinex cryptocurrency exchange, based in Hong Kong, announced it had suffered a security breach. Around 2,000 approved transactions were sent to a single wallet from users' segregated wallets. Immediately thereafter, bitcoin's trading price plunged by 20%, causing the value of the stolen bitcoins to dip to US$58 million. After learning of the breach, Bitfinex halted all bitcoin withdrawals and trading and said it was tracking down the perpetrators of the hack. Exchange customers, even those whose accounts had not been broken into, had their account balance reduced by 36% and received BFX tokens in proportion to their losses. The exchange's access to U.S. dollar payments and withdrawals was then curtailed. The hack happened even though Bitfinex was securing the funds with BitGo, which uses multiple-signature security.

In July 2023, Bitfinex worked with the Department of Homeland Security to recover about $315,000 in cash and cryptocurrencies stolen in the 2016 breach. The funds will be redistributed to holders of Bitfinex's Recovery Right Tokens, digital coins issued to people who suffered financial losses due to the hack.

== Laundering ==
In early 2017, small amounts of the stolen bitcoins began to be moved from the wallet it had been initially stored in to the Dark Web marketplace AlphaBay with the intention of laundering it. After AlphaBay was shuttered by international law enforcement led by the FBI, the money was rerouted to the Russian marketplace Hydra. The shutdown of AlphaBay may have given law enforcement access to the service's internal transaction logs and allowed it to identify the perpetrators.

In February 2022, a New York couple, Ilya Lichtenstein (aged 34) and his wife Heather R. Morgan (aged 31), were charged by US federal authorities with conspiring to launder the bitcoins, which was worth US$5.3 billion at the time. Lichtenstein was an entrepreneur who had co-founded a sales company called MixRank. Morgan was an entrepreneur, columnist for Inc., former Forbes digital contributor (from 2017 to 2021), and online rapper. Although neither were charged with committing the hack, law enforcement had acquired a search warrant for a cloud storage service used by Lichtenstein, obtaining a spreadsheet of wallet addresses and passwords linked to the hack. Though the stolen bitcoins could be tracked through public transactions logged on the blockchain, it was only after the wallet passwords were recovered that law enforcement could access and seize their contents.

Some of the funds were moved to more traditional financial accounts and spent on gold, NFTs, Uber rides and a PlayStation. Although hundreds of millions of dollars were converted to fiat currency, 80% of the bitcoins (approximately 94,000) remained in the original wallet at the center of the hack.

In August 2023, Lichtenstein pleaded guilty to conspiracy to commit money laundering, and Morgan to one count of money laundering conspiracy and one count of conspiracy to defraud the United States. Lichtenstein additionally admitted to carrying out the hack. An information was filed against both defendants.

In November 2024, Lichtenstein was sentenced to 60 months in prison and three years of supervised release. Morgan was sentenced to 18 months in prison and three years of supervised release for fraud and conspiracy charges.

On December 6, 2024, Netflix released a documentary directed by Chris Smith featuring the story of Lichtenstein's and Morgan's crimes, titled Biggest Heist Ever.

In 2025, President Donald Trump signed an executive order to create a Strategic Bitcoin Reserve including Bitcoin seized by US law enforcement. In theory, this includes over 100,000 Bitcoin seized from the Bitfinex hackers, but the US Department of Justice has recommended to the courts that the Bitcoin seized after the hack be returned to Bitfinex.

In January 2026, Lichtenstein was granted early release to supervised probation under the provisions of the First Step Act of 2018. The release was facilitated by the accumulation of earned time credits through vocational training provided by the Bureau of Prisons. Following his release, Lichtenstein publicly stated his intention to transition into a career in cybersecurity, citing the rehabilitative goals of the federal reform legislation.

== See also ==
- History of bitcoin
- Strategic bitcoin reserve
