= Dag Detter =

Swedish investment advisor

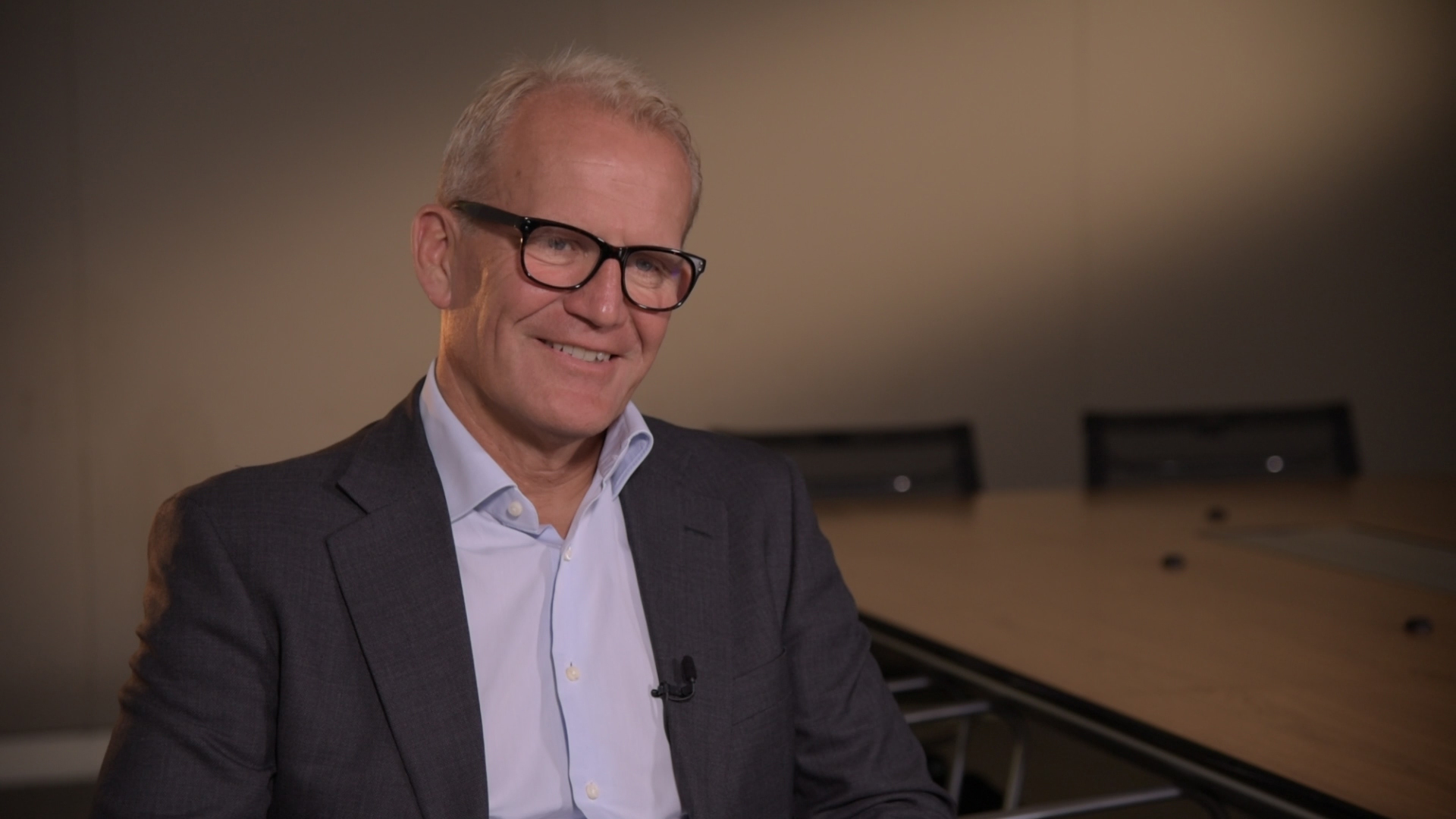
- Education: Lund University
- Writing career
- Notable work: The Public Wealth of Nations
- Website: detterco.com

Dag Detter is a Swedish investment advisor, as well as an author and speaker on the topic of public commercial assets. He is the former President of Stattum and Director at the Swedish Ministry of Industry, leading the restructuring of the government portfolio of public assets during the reforms 1998–2001.

Together with Stefan Fölster, he is the author of two books, including The Public Wealth of Nations : How Management of Public Assets Can Boost or Bust Economic Growth (Palgrave, 2015), included in The Economist — Books of the Year 2015 and the Financial Times FT's Best Books of the Year 2015. The book argues that better management of public assets would increase global living standards and improve the fabric of democratic institutions.

In 2017 The Brookings Institution Press published The Public Wealth of Cities : How to Unlock Hidden Assets to Boost Growth and Prosperity. This book focuses on the local level of governments and says that while many cities and counties are scrambling to find money to survive, they are sitting on an enormous untapped wealth which could be used to pay not only for infrastructure but also investments in any important social functions The book states that economic vitality and financial stability to cities could be achieved by focusing on public wealth and shifting attention and resources from short-term spending to longer-term investments through the creation of urban wealth funds.

Detter has also written for the Financial Times, The Wall Street Journal, Project Syndicate, Foreign Affairs, Foreign Policy, International Monetary Fund, The World Bank, Chicago Tribune, Public Finance, and The Globe and Mail, as well as the World Economic Forum.

The book 'Public Net Worth' (co-authored) was selected by Martin Wolf as one of Financial Times "Best summer books of 2024: Economics".

== Works ==
- The Public Wealth of Nations : How Management of Public Assets Can Boost or Bust Economic Growth, London: Palgrave, 2015, ISBN 978-1-137-51986-3
- The Public Wealth of Cities : How to Unlock Hidden Assets to Boost Growth and Prosperity, Washington, D.C. : Brookings Institution Press, 2017, ISBN 978-0-815-72998-3, OCLC 955019705
- "The Rise of Legal Cheating: People think the system is rigged and are losing faith in democracy", Prospect Magazine, April 24, 2017
- Unlocking Public Wealth: Governments could do a better job managing their assets, Washington, D.C. : International Monetary Fund, Finance & Development, March 2018
- "The potential of state commercial property: mapping and managing non-financial public assets", International Journal of Public Policy, Vol. 15, Nos. 1/2, pp. 111–124.
- Public Net Worth : Accounting, Government and Democracy, London: Palgrave MacMillan, 2024, ISBN 978-3-031-44342-8
