= Texas Strategic Bitcoin Reserve =

Bitcoin based state reserve fund

The Texas Strategic Bitcoin Reserve is a strategic reserve fund that enables the State of Texas to purchase cryptocurrency.

== History ==
The bill was originally introduced as SB 21 by Senator Charles Schwertner as a way to enable the State of Texas to purchase digital cryptocurrency as a strategic reserve. Any cryptocurrencies purchased with money in the reserve must have an average 24-month market capitalization of at least $500 billion. The bill was co-written by Representative Giovanni Capriglione. It was reported to mirror the strategic bitcoin reserve of the United States federal government created through executive order by Donald Trump.

It passed the Texas Senate in March 2025 by a vote of 25 to 5. It passed the Texas House of Representatives in May 2025 by a vote of 101 to 42.

The bill was signed into law by Governor Greg Abbott on June 22, 2025. Following Arizona and New Hampshire, Texas is the third state to enact legislation creating a bitcoin reserve on the state level.

On November 20, 2025, Texas bought $5 million worth of Bitcoin at a price of approximately $87,000 per BTC. This initial purchase was done through the BlackRock iShares Bitcoin Trust ETF (Nasdaq: IBIT).

== See also ==
- Sovereign wealth fund
- Local wealth fund
