= U.S. Strategic Bitcoin Reserve =

2025 executive order signed by Trump

- "Establishment of the Strategic Bitcoin Reserve and United States Digital Asset Stockpile"
- Type: Executive order
- President: Donald Trump
- Signed: March 6, 2025

Summary
- Establishes a Strategic Bitcoin Reserve to maintain government-owned Bitcoin as a national reserve asset, along with a Digital Asset Stockpile for other cryptocurrencies.

The Strategic Bitcoin Reserve is a proposed reserve asset, funded by the United States Department of the Treasury's forfeited bitcoin, announced by United States president Donald Trump in March 2025. The creation of the United States Digital Asset Stockpile for non-bitcoin assets was also announced. Trump has previously stated that he wants the United States to become the "crypto capital of the world".

The reserve will be capitalized with bitcoin already owned by the federal government. The United States federal government is the largest known state holder of bitcoin in the world, estimated to hold about 328,372 BTC, as of February 2026.

The reserve has provoked mixed reactions, from some economists criticizing the idea, to governments of several states initializing similar projects.

== History ==
During his first presidency (2017–2021), Trump voiced his disapproval of bitcoin and other cryptocurrencies, but later changed his mind.

On July 15, 2024, Donald Trump officially selected JD Vance as his running mate for the presidential election. Vance was the first known Bitcoin owner to run for vice-president. On July 27, 2024, Trump announced his intention to establish a bitcoin reserve, if elected.

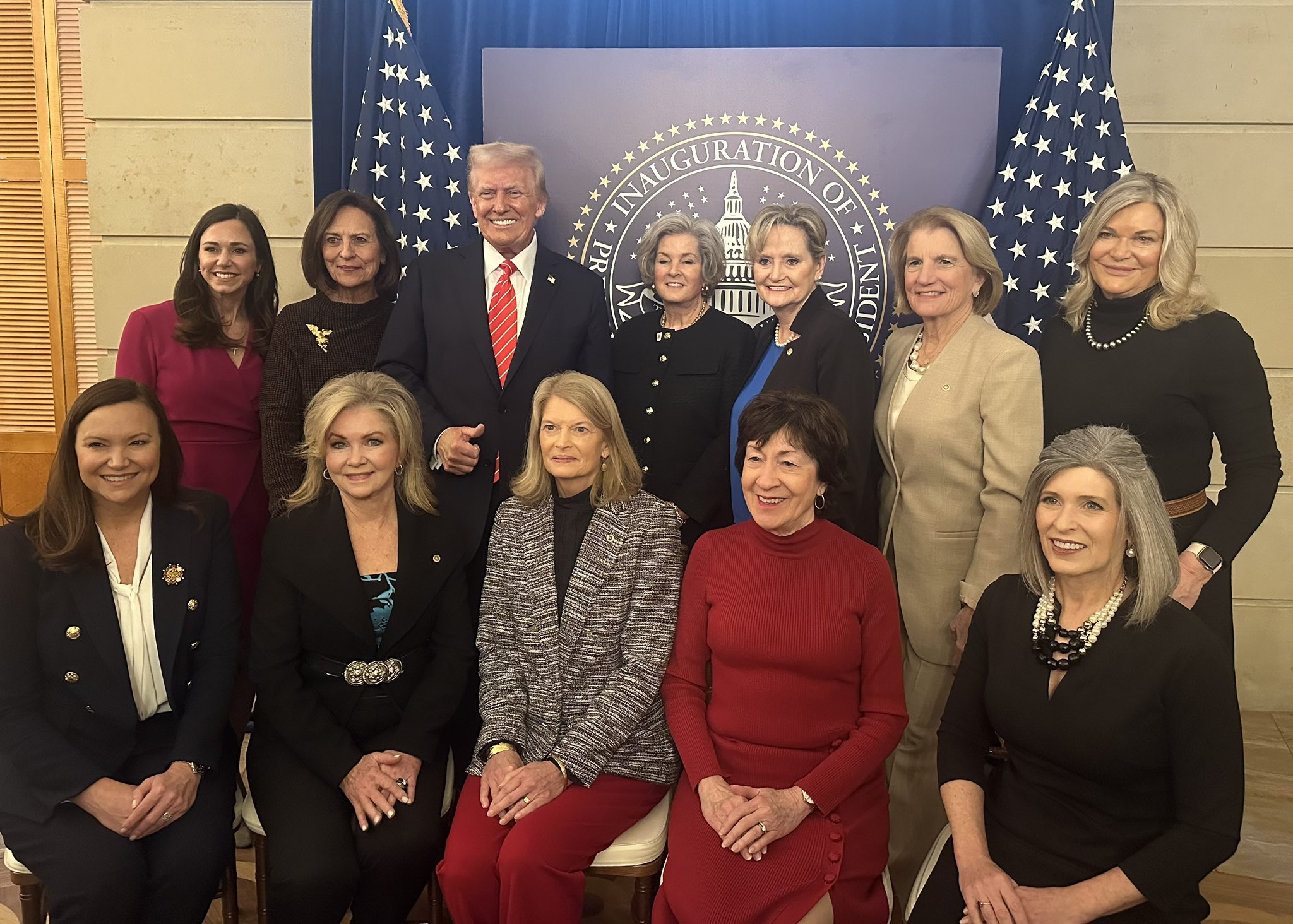
President Donald Trump with Republican senators, 19 January 2025. On the top right - Cynthia Lummis

On July 31, 2024, Republican senator Cynthia Lummis introduced BITCOIN Act proposing the creation of a strategic bitcoin reserve and a purchase of 1,000,000 BTC for it. The Act was blocked by Democratic senator Sherrod Brown.

In August 2024, Trump disclosed that he owns $1–5 million worth of ethereum.

In November 2024, Trump chose Howard Lutnick to be the United States Secretary of Commerce. Lutnick owns “hundreds of millions of dollars” in bitcoin, according to his own public statements.

In December 2024, Trump said he would nominate Paul S. Atkins to run the Securities and Exchange Commission (SEC). Atkins has been involved in several cryptocurrency advocacy groups, including the Token Alliance and the Chamber of Digital Commerce. Gary Gensler, the head of the SEC at the time, was a "staunch advocate of sweeping cryptocurrency regulation".

In January 2025, Trump signed an executive order, titled "Strengthening American Leadership in Digital Financial Technology," established the Presidential Working Group on Digital Asset Markets to evaluate the potential creation of a national digital asset stockpile and to propose criteria for establishing such a stockpile. The order also proposed to use lawfully seized cryptocurrencies to fill the stockpile.

In February 2025, the House Committee on Financial Services and the Senate Banking Committee held hearings on the topic of Biden's administration's alleged attempts to suppress the American cryptocurrency industry. Also in February, Trump nominated Brian Quintenz, an advocate of cryptocurrencies, to head the CFTC.

On March 3, 2025, President Trump announced that the reserve would include Solana (SOL), Cardano (ADA), Ripple (XRP), Ethereum (ETH), and Bitcoin (BTC) aiming to make the US the "Crypto Capital of the World" and support industry growth. The announcement caused the prices of Solana, Cardano, and XRP to jump after Trump's announcement, followed by the prices gradually declining on Monday.

The reserve is intended to elevate the digital asset sector, responding to what Trump described as previous Biden administration attacks. It marks a shift from a vague stockpile concept to naming specific cryptocurrencies, potentially purchased or held by the government for strategic purposes. The working group, chaired by the White House AI & Crypto Czar David Sacks, is expected to provide recommendations by July 2025.

The next day after signing the second executive order, Trump held a "Digital Asset Summit" in the White House, attended by representatives of major American crypto companies, including Chainlink, Gemini, Robinhood, Kraken, MicroStrategy, Coinbase, Paradigm, and others.

On March 11, 2025, senator Cynthia Lummis introduced a bitcoin reserve bill again, this time co-sponsored by 5 other senators. The bill would direct a purchase of 1 mln BTC over five years, by diversifying existing federal funds. According to Lummis, the bill will transform "the president’s visionary executive action into enduring law".

On March 24, 2025, Bo Hines, the executive director of the President's Council of Advisers on Digital Assets, stated that selling some of the U.S. gold holdings would be a budget-neutral way to acquire more bitcoin.

In March 2025, two federal banking regulators (OCC and FDIC) announced that banks do not need to receive advance permission to engage in cryptocurrency anymore. In April 2025, the U.S. Justice Department disbanded its National Cryptocurrency Enforcement Team, citing a Trump's order to allow citizens to access blockchain networks without facing persecution.

In July 2025, Trump signed The Guiding and Establishing National Innovation for U.S. Stablecoins Act (GENIUS Act). The new law allows banks, nonbanks and credit unions to issue their own stablecoins, under certain conditions.

In January 2026, Patrick Witt, the executive director of the President's Council of Advisors for Digital Assets at the White House, said that the administration is committed to establishing the reserve, but there are "obscure legal provisions" to overcome.

== Executive order ==
A strategic reserve is a stockpile of resources kept by governments to provide a safety net during hard times. Examples include the US Strategic Petroleum Reserve and United States Bullion Depository for gold.

On March 6, 2025, Trump signed an executive order to establish a strategic bitcoin reserve. The executive order establishes:

- A Strategic Bitcoin Reserve as a permanent reserve asset, funded by Treasury's forfeited bitcoin. Agencies will explore transferring their bitcoin to this reserve. The US won't sell these coins and may develop taxpayer-neutral strategies of acquiring more bitcoin.
- A U.S. Digital Asset Stockpile for non-bitcoin digital assets forfeited to Treasury. No additional assets will be acquired beyond forfeitures. Treasury may determine stewardship strategies, including potential sales.
- A requirement for all agencies to fully account for their digital asset holdings to Treasury and the President's Working Group on Digital Asset Markets.

Federal agencies must account for all digital assets and review transfer authority within 30 days. Also, the Treasury Secretary must evaluate legal and investment factors and propose legislation within 60 days. Both of these deadlines have passed with no update or action from Federal agencies or the Treasury Secretary.

== Reactions ==
In a February 2025 survey of economists by University of Chicago, not a single economist agreed that borrowing money to create a strategic crypto reserve would benefit the US economy or that holding crypto assets would lower the risk of central banks' international reserves portfolios. In both cases, 13% declined to answer, and 8% answered as "uncertain".

According to a representative of S&P Global Ratings, "The significance of [Trump's] executive order is mainly symbolic, as it marks the first time Bitcoin is formally recognized as a reserve asset of the United States government."

Deutsche Welle, a German state-owned broadcaster, lists the following pros and cons of the proposed US national bitcoin reserve:

- Enhances financial stability by diversifying national reserves.
- Boosts the legitimacy of cryptocurrencies among financial institutions.
- Utilizes seized assets without additional taxpayer cost.
- Represents a speculative investment with unclear strategic benefits, which could vanish in a market crash.
- Could enable government manipulation of the crypto market, as is common with gold and fiat currencies.
- Faces legal and political challenges regarding legitimacy, unless it gains the necessary congressional support.

Avik Roy, a policy analyst, in 2021 proposed that the United States establish a strategic Bitcoin reserve as a complement to its existing holdings of gold and Treasury securities. Roy argues that Bitcoin combines several characteristics desirable in the long-term store of value, including a fixed supply, divisibility, portability, durability, security, and resistance to censorship. He suggests that allocating a portion of the United States Treasury's assets to Bitcoin could provide a hedge against the long-term erosion of the dollar caused by inflation or fiscal imbalances. In particular, Roy recommends replacing a small fraction of gold holdings with Bitcoin, both to signal confidence in innovative financial technologies and to diversify the Treasury's portfolio. This approach is presented as a potential strategy to enhance national financial security and preserve the purchasing power of public assets without directly disrupting the dollar or traditional monetary policy.

=== Governments ===
Belarus: president of Belarus Alexander Lukashenko announced that the country should develop its cryptocurrency mining industry, arguing that the bitcoin reserve in the US is an indication of cryptocurrencies' global importance.

European Union: the managing director of the European Stability Mechanism publicly criticized the US policy shift towards cryptocurrencies, arguing that it could "affect the euro area's monetary sovereignty and financial stability" due to the risks for the EU's digital euro project, especially from the possibility that American tech giants will create their own stablecoins. President of the European Central Bank also criticized the idea, and stated that "bitcoin will not enter the reserves of any of the central banks of the [EU]."

India: the Economic Affairs Secretary Ajay Seth announced that the Indian government is reviewing its stance on cryptocurrencies, due to the recent more positive attitude towards them in other countries.

Pakistan: Bilal Bin Saqib, Chief Advisor to the Finance Minister, announced that the country will allocate part of its surplus electricity to Bitcoin mining.

South Korea: in an official response, the Bank of Korea stated that it was not considering including bitcoin into reserves, citing high price volatility and the non-compliance with IMF's criteria for foreign exchange reserves.

Switzerland: Swiss National Bank rejected a proposal to create a bitcoin reserve, citing bitcoin's volatility, relatively small market capitalisation, and the fact that bitcoin is a software.

United States: 16 US states have introduced state-level bitcoin reserve legislation, as of March 7, 2025.

- Arizona: two reserve-related bills were introduced and passed by the state legislature. Governor Katie Hobbs vetoed one of them (SB 1025), but signed the second one (HB 2749) into law. The bill allows using seized assets for the Arizona reserve, but explicitly precludes buying assets.
- Florida: withdrew the bill.
- Montana: a bill failed to advance.
- New Hampshire: on May 6, 2025, governor Kelly Ayotte signed HB 302, a bill that allows the state treasure to invest into precious metals and sufficiently large digital assets (with at least $500 billion market cap). At the time, only Bitcoin satisfied the requirement. Unlike the federal bitcoin reserve, the bill allows buying more Bitcoin, not just storing the current holdings.
- North Dakota: a bill failed to advance.
- Oklahoma: passed out of committee.
- Pennsylvania: a bill failed to advance.
- Texas: Measure S.B.21 signed into law on June 22, 2025, creating Texas Strategic Bitcoin Reserve.
- Utah: passed out of committee.
- Wyoming: a bill failed to advance.

== Other countries ==
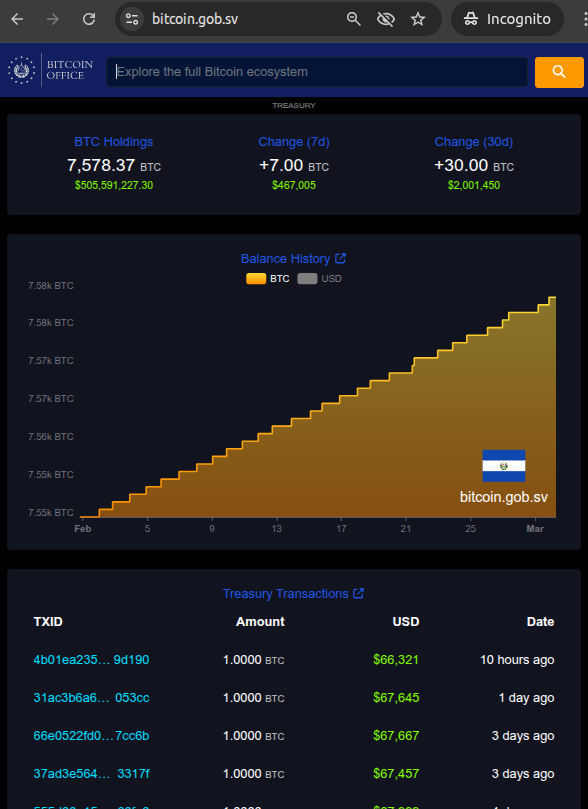
Bitcoin holdings of El Salvador

=== Ongoing ===
In 2020, Iran implemented regulations that require Iranian bitcoin miners to sell bitcoin to the Central Bank of Iran, so the central bank can use it for imports. Shaparak, a subsidiary of the Central Bank of Iran, maintains control over 42 cryptocurrency exchanges.

As of 2024, Bhutan, through the country's sovereign investment arm, is running a large-scale bitcoin mining operation, utilizing the country's abundant hydroelectric resources. This allowed Bhutan to accumulate $750 million in bitcoin holdings, representing 28% of the small country's GDP.

As of March 2025, El Salvador has over 6102 BTC in its bitcoin reserves (worth $550 million at the time).

=== Proposed ===
Parliaments of several countries introduced bills to allow their respective central banks to hold a bitcoin reserve, including Argentina, Brazil, Hong Kong, Japan.

Japan's Government Pension Investment Fund has announced plans to explore diversifying into Bitcoin.

In December 2024, Russian state-owned news agency RIA Novosti reported on an official proposal to create a Russian strategic bitcoin reserve, after Putin praised bitcoin as an alternative to foreign currency reserves.

In January 2025, the Czech National Bank announced that it will consider holding as much as 5% of its 140 billion euro ($146 billion) reserves in bitcoin.

=== Countries with large bitcoin holdings ===
Authorities of several countries have accumulated large bitcoin holdings. As of March 2025, according to Al Jazeera, known state holders included:

- United States (200,000 BTC)
- China (194,000 BTC)
- United Kingdom (61 BTC)
- Ukraine (1200 BTC)
- Finland (890 BTC)
- India (450 BTC)

Most of these holdings were the proceeds of fraud or drug crime seized by authorities. Ukrainian holdings are mostly donations in support of its war effort.

== See also ==
- Bitcoin and politics
- 2016 Bitfinex hack
- Sovereign wealth fund and Local wealth fund
- Texas Strategic Bitcoin Reserve
