= Nordisk Fjer =

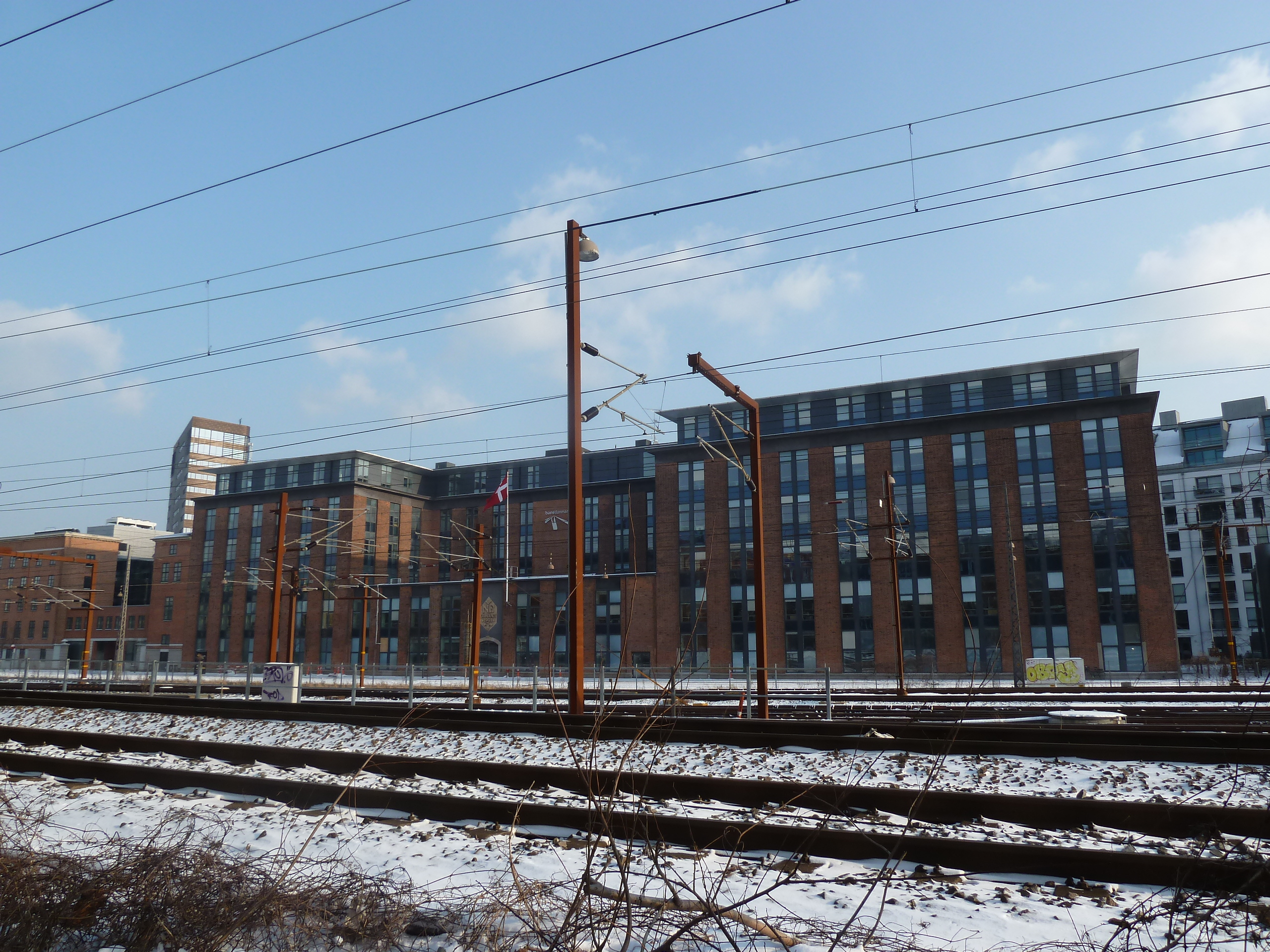
Former headquarters of Nordisk Fjer in Copenhagen

Nordisk Fjer, formerly named Nordisk Fjerfabrik A/S (Nordic Feather Factory), was a Danish feather processing company established in 1901 and existing until 1991. It was founded in Svendborg by Hans Ove Lange, but moved to Copenhagen during its rapid expansion in the interwar period. During its existence, it traded and cleaned feathers for use in the duvet and furniture industries. The company peaked economically in 1989 with a revenue of 400 million USD, employing 4300 people in 12 countries. In 1991 the company folded in one of the largest Danish corporate scandals.

== History ==
From its start, Nordisk Fjer imported feather from primarily China and Russia, processing it for the European market. From 1917 the company started exporting to the United States, and from the 1920s to the United Kingdom, Germany, China and Japan. It was introduced on the stock exchange in 1928. During the interwar period, subsidiaries was started in Sweden, United Kingdom and the Netherlands to support the growing European sales operations.

After a production decrease during the Second World War, production increased again from 1945, establishing production and trading companies in Malaya, Canada and Japan. In the 1970s the company faced new challenges as its debt rose from approximately 8 million USD in 1970 to around 200 million USD in 1984. Its profits did not rise due to investment failures in the decade. During the 1980s, a series of revaluations of the company's assets was made to disguise its critical economic challenges.

In 1978 Nordisk Fjer CEO Johannes Petersen decided to focus on introducing feather-duvets on the American market. Although it did not pay off initially, Petersen decided to expand and establish new production facilities in the U.S., Australia and Japan. In 1988, the company acquired the American textile company Chatham Manufacturing Company as part of a strategy to grow in the American market. With its 2500 employees, the acquisition doubled the company's size. In 1990, the strategy was named "Project Southern Comfort", gathering all subsidiaries, production sites and activities in the Dutch company Northern Feather International N.V. of which the listed company Nordisk Fjerfabrik Holding A/S would own 48%. The remaining 52% were to be sold off to three international partners for a price of 80 million USD. The Danish holding company transformed to an investment company only.

The corporation founded the dorm Nordisk Kollegium in Copenhagen in 1942. During the corporation's existence it supported the dorm financially.

== Corporate structure ==
Nordisk Fjer was structured in a series of subsidiaries based on the various consumer products. Among them where Nordisk Tekstil (Nordic Textile) and Nordisk tekstiltryk (Nordic Textile Print). Nordisk Fjer acquired Nordisk Tekstil in 1955, but kept it as an independent subsidiary under the name Nordisk Tekstil Væveri with its own factory in Odense. It was considered the only part of Nordisk Fjer not active in the later scandal, and was continued under various forms until it was acquired by ARCTIC A/S in 2011.

Headquartered in Copenhagen's Freeport, the company established production sites or merged with competitors throughout Denmark. At its closure it had large production sites in Odense and Middelfart

== CEOs ==
- 1901–1961 H.O. Lange (from 1947 along with Kaj Neckelmann)
- 1961–1969 Hildur Friis-Hansen
- 1969–1990 Johannes Petersen (functioning as chairman 1987–90)

== Scandal ==
In 1991, the company was part of one of the largest Danish corporate scandals. The scandal formed a new standard in Danish corporate structure, disallowing the CEO and Chairman to be the same person. The last CEO Johannes Petersen committed suicide following the bankruptcy.

Until 1990 the accountancy principles had been changed 32 times and auditors had been replaced eight times. Johannes Petersen, as CEO and chair of the company, used many means to hide the critical state of the company. Until his suicide in 1990, he claimed to have sold 52% of the company to foreign investors.

Through the 1980s, Nordisk Fjer had returned 10% annually to its investors, although profits were declining. Whenever the company's cash flows were low, Petersen took out new loans, leaning on Nordisk Fjer's good reputation amongst Danish as well as international banks. For the auditors, the company's real assets were blurred by a systematic procedure of marking cheap feathers as expensive ones as well as internal sales of production equipment at grossly inflated prices, making it impossible to assess the company's financial situation. From 1979 and onwards, Nordisk Fjers auditors warned Petersen of the tendency in the company to inflate its values, but they left the financial reports unmarked. Through the 1980s, Petersen adopted a system of subsidiaries to disguise the real value of the company to the auditors.

To be able to take out new loans, despite the company's financial challenges, Petersen engaged supreme court attorney Poul Schmidt, and professor in national economics and chairman of the board of the Danish National Bank Poul Nørregaard Rasmussen in the company board.

At the bankruptcy in March 1991, Nordisk Fjer owed approximately 500 million USD to its creditors.

=== Legal case ===
In a scandalous court case in 1998, three executives of Nordisk Fjer were found guilty of fraud towards creditors and investors and sentenced to between two and four years in prison. Vice President Erik Von Scholten was sentenced to four years in prison, CEO of the American subsidiary was sentenced to two and a half years, while CFO Anders Weyrup – who ultimately acted as whistle-blower – was sentenced to two years in prison. Three auditors were found guilty of negligence and fined, along with personal assistant and HR director Inga Lydia Rasmussen. The civil proceedings finished in 2000, sentencing the responsible board members in Nordisk Fjer to pay 100 million DKK to the company's creditors. In 2002, the bankruptcy's estate was closed down, leaving creditors with a loss of approximately 550 million USD and investors with a loss of approximately 180 million USD.
