= The Public Wealth of Nations =

Non-fiction book by Dag Detter and Stefan Fölster

The Public Wealth of Nations: How Management of Public Assets Can Boost or Bust Economic Growth
- Authors: Dag Detter and Stefan Fölster
- Language: English
- Subject: Public Finance, Public Policy
- Genre: Nonfiction
- Publisher: Palgrave MacMillan
- Publication date: July 27, 2015
- Publication place: Sweden
- Media type: Hardcover, Audiobook, Amazon Kindle
- Pages: 230

The Public Wealth of Nations: How Management of Public Assets Can Boost or Bust Economic Growth (Palgrave, 2015) is a non-fiction book, co-authored by Dag Detter and Stefan Fölster, stating that governments have trillions of dollars in commercial assets, from companies and forests to real estate, but they are often poorly managed.

The book says that things could be improved by ring-fencing assets from political meddling in independent Public Wealth Funds (PWFs)—holding companies whose professional managers are free to treat them as if they were privately owned. The focus, they argue, should be on yield, not ownership.

The book was included in The Economist—Books of the Year 2015 and the Financial Times, FT's Best Books of the Year 2015. The authors argue that better management of public assets could increase global living standards and improve the fabric of democratic institutions across the world, and that such management could raise 2.7 trillion US$ annually for governments.
