= Pre-delivery inspection =

A pre-delivery inspection is an inspection carried out, either by a purchaser or seller, prior to the final delivery of the product. It is used in several industries.

== Automotive industry ==
In the automotive industry, a pre-delivery inspection is "the final check carried out by the dealer on a car before they hand it over to you", and includes various checks to ensure that the vehicle is up to a certain standard before it is presented to the purchaser.

== Real estate ==
The pre-delivery inspection, which generally applies to newly built homes, is a real estate term that means the buyer has the option (or requirement, depending upon how the real estate contract is written) to inspect the property prior to closing or settlement. These inspections generally take place up to a week before a closing, and they generally allow buyers the first opportunity to inspect their new home. Additionally, the inspection is to ensure that all terms of the contract have been met, that the home is substantially completed, and that major items are in working order.
