= By & Havn =

Coordinates: 55°41′19.06″N 12°35′54.83″E

- Company type: Private
- Industry: Real estate
- Founded: 1 October 2007
- Headquarters: Copenhagen, Denmark
- Key people: Anne Skovbro (CEO), Pia Gjellerup (Chairman)
- Website: www.byoghavn.dk

By & Havn (English: City & Port) or Udviklingsselskabet By & Havn I/S (en.: The corporation for development of City and Port I/S) is an organisation, tasked with the development of Ørestad and the port of Copenhagen and the daily operations of the latter, which is done through a subsidiary, Copenhagen Malmö Port. By & Havn is owned by Copenhagen Municipality (55%) and the Danish government, through its ministry of transport (45%). Key areas of the organisation are Ørestad, Nordhavnen, Amerika Plads, Sluseholmen and Teglholmen. Currently the CEO is Anne Skovbro, while Pia Gjellerup serves as director of the board.

== History ==
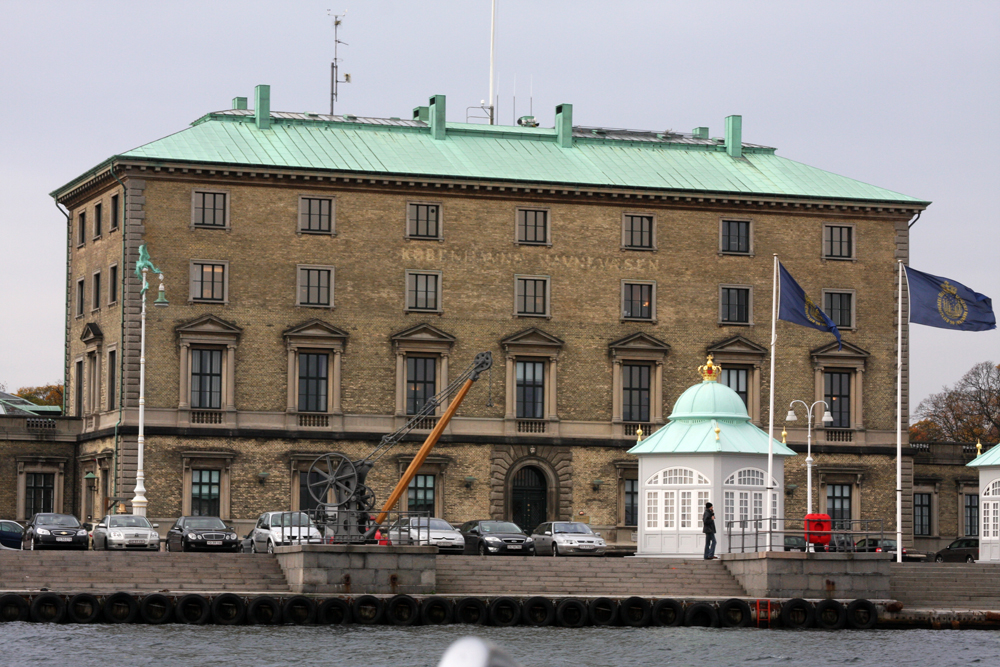
The old custom house from 1868, on Nordre Toldbod, serves as the headquarters for By & Havn.

The general partnership organisation, was established in October 2007, with the abolition of three organisations: Ørestadsselskabet I/S, Frederiksbergbaneselskabet I/S and Københavns Havn A/S. The headquarters was established in the old custom house at Nordre Toldbod. At the time of formation, the organisation was named Arealudviklingsselskabet I/S, but on May 14, 2008, the name was changed to By & Havn.
