= Port of Copenhagen =

Largest Danish seaport

Coordinates: 55.6718°N 12.5817°E

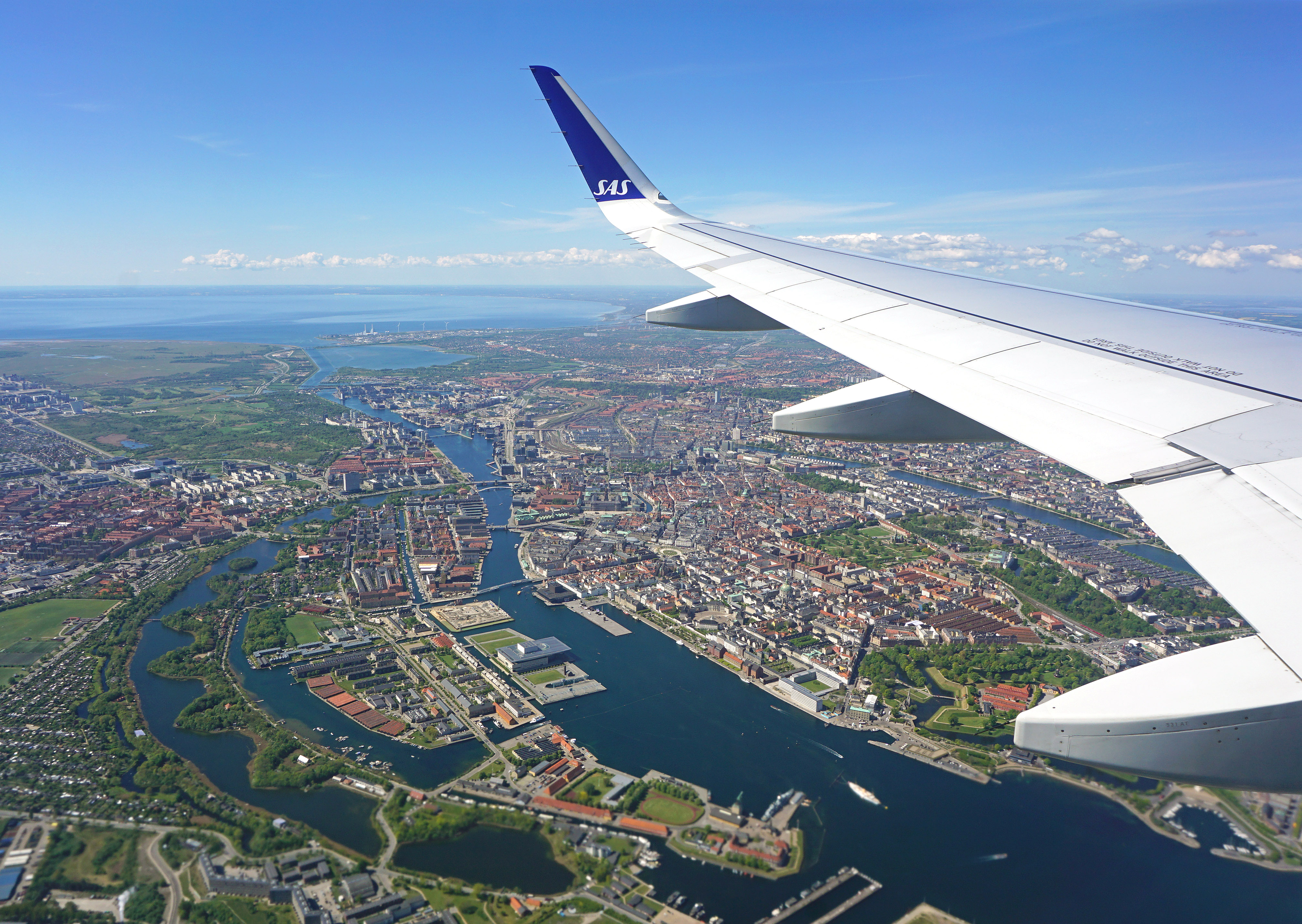
Port of Copenhagen, aerial view of Copenhagen

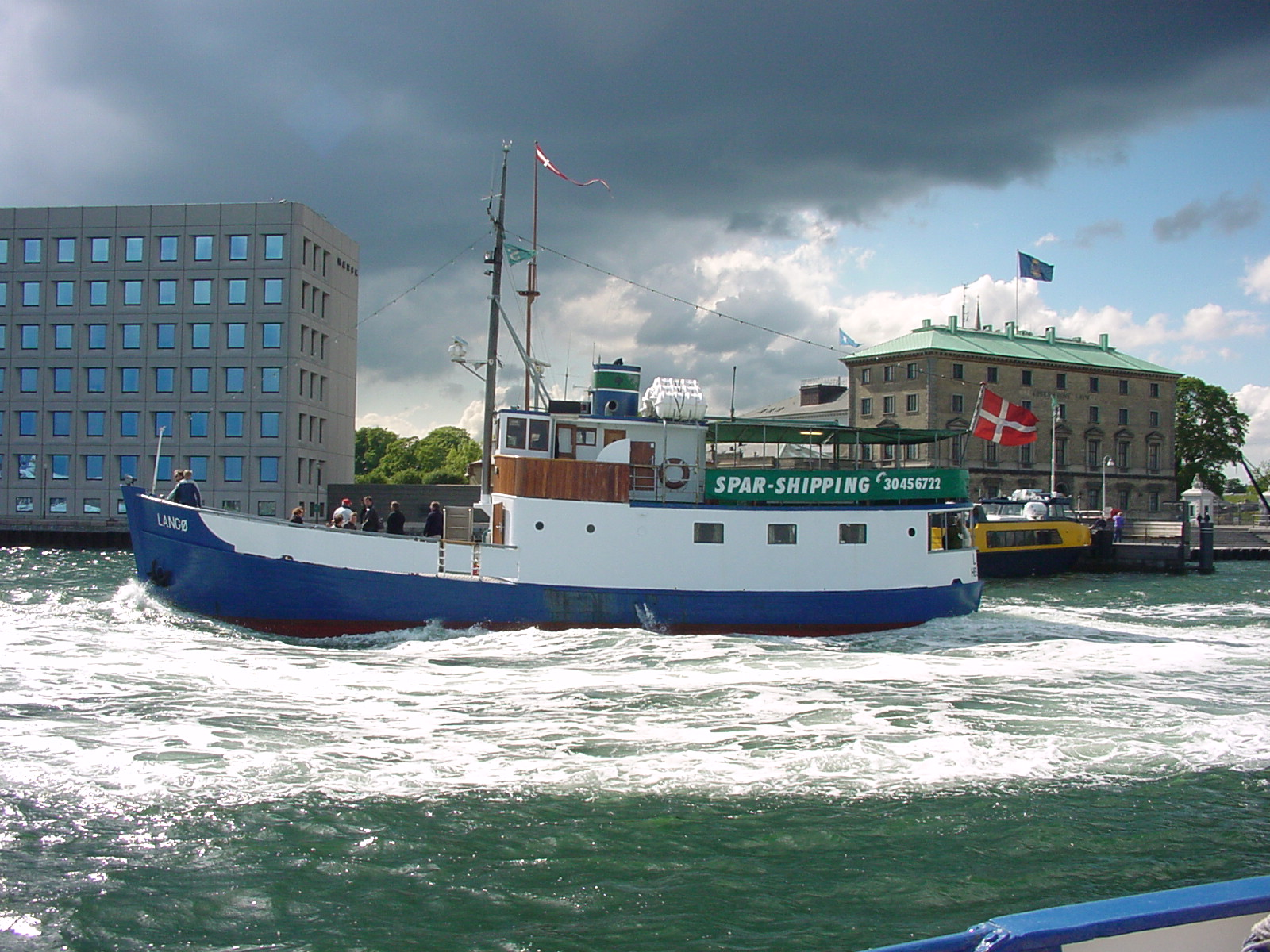
Inderhavnen, Indre By

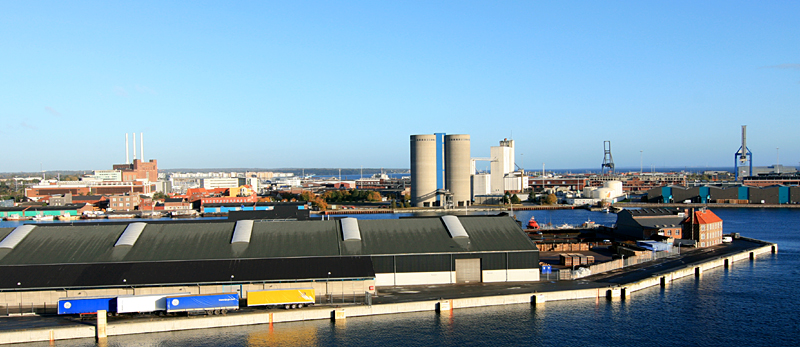
Nordhavnen

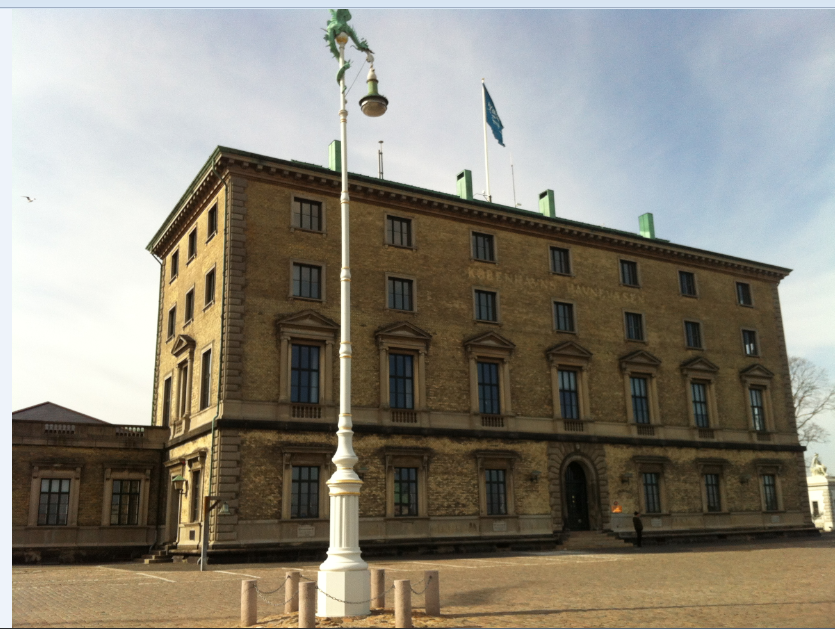
The administration building on the Esplanade

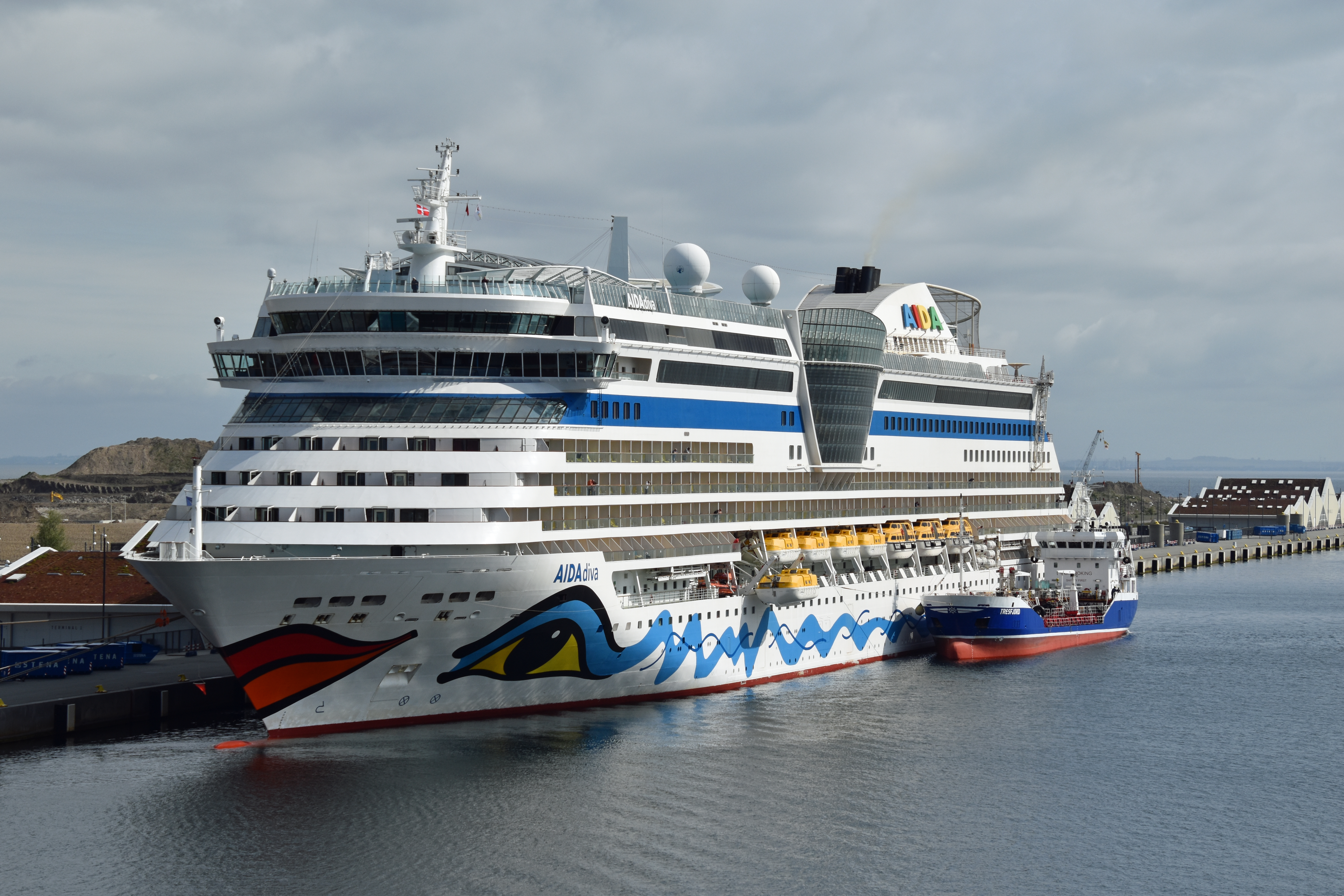
AIDAviva docked at the Oceankaj wharf used for Cruiseships

The Port of Copenhagen (Danish: Københavns Havn) is the largest Danish seaport and one of the largest ports in the Baltic Sea basin. It extends from Svanemølle Beach in the north to Hvidovre in the south. Along with Malmö harbour, Copenhagen Port is operated by Copenhagen Malmö Port (CMP) and By & Havn.

The port is divided into several different areas, many of which are individual harbours:

- Nordhavnen
- Refshaleøen
- Freeport of Copenhagen
- Inderhavnen
- Holmen
- Sydhavnen
- Prøvestenen

There has been rapid development along the seafront; large parts of the formerly industrial inner harbor have recently been transformed into residential, recreative, and commercial areas. The port has seen a dramatic resurgence in activity since the 1990s, following a long period of decline following the 1940s.

== History ==
The Port of Copenhagen dates back to the Middle Ages. The port was originally owned by the Danish royal family. Christian IV moved Naval Shipyard from Gammelholm to its current location in Holmen—the Holmen Naval Base one of several naval stations of the Royal Danish Navy. In 1742 the port was turned into an independent institution and remained unchanged until 1812, when a central administration was set up, called "Ports and Mudringsvæsenet".

=== Port Captains ===
- 1860-1872 Janus August Garde
- 1872-1895 FVW Lüders
- 1896-1914 Christian Frederik Drechsel
- 1917-1945 Thorvald Borg
- 1945-1955 Mogens Blach
- 1982-1997 Erik Schaefer
- 1997-2005 Henning Hummelmose
- 2005-2007 Karl-Gustav Jensen

In 2007, administration of the port passed to By & Havn.

== Terminals ==
- Container terminal: The terminal was opened in 2001 and has a storage area of 175,000 m^{2}.
- RoRo terminal: The RoRo terminal has four berths an m^{2}
- Automobile terminal: The cars terminal is the largest in Northern Europe used for imports of new cars and can accommodate 40,000 cars at once.
- General cargo: The general cargo terminal has 10 berths and a storage area of 200,000 m^{2}.
- Liquid bulk terminal: The liquid bulk terminal has an annual traffic of five million tonnes, a storage area of 834,000 m^{2} and a storage capacity of one million m^{3}.
- Dry bulk terminal: The dry bulk terminal has an annual traffic of five million tonnes, a storage area of 834,000 m^{2} and has storage capacities for coal, stone, sand, gravel, plaster, scrap, cement, biofuel, salt, granite and earth.
- Passenger terminal: The Port of Copenhagen has one of the largest passenger terminals in the Baltic Sea basin which handled 1.6 million passengers in 2007.

== See also ==
- Ports of the Baltic Sea
