= Plesner (law firm) =

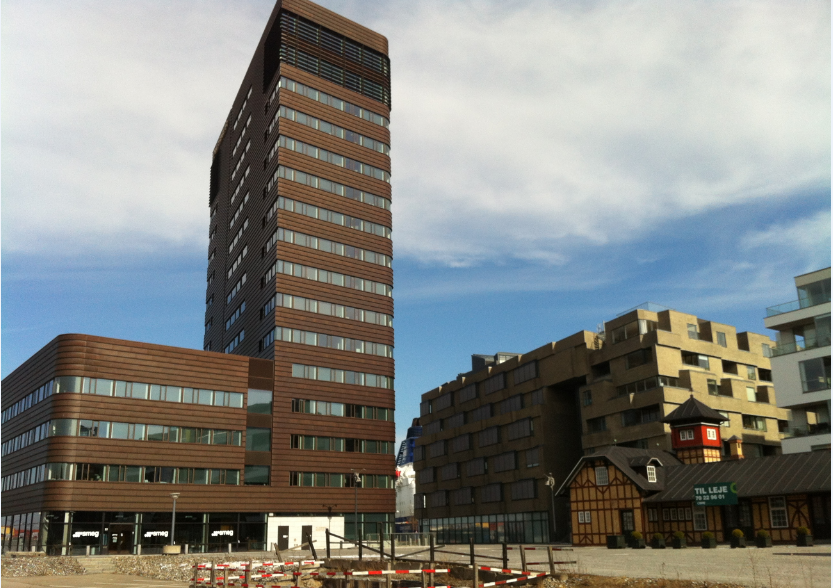
- Company type: Partnership
- Industry: Law
- Founded: 1918
- Founder: Poul Jacobsen
- Headquarters: Copenhagen, Denmark
- Key people: Tom Kári Kristjánsson (Managing Partner) Nicolai Ørsted(Chairman)
- Number of employees: approx. 425 (2019)
- Website: www.plesner.com

Plesner is a Danish law firm which deals with many areas of commercial law. The company has 61 partners, and a total staff of about 425.

It was founded in 1918 by Poul Jacobsen and has grown through a series of mergers with other Danish law firms. Kaj Holm-Nielsen and Mogens Plesner became partners in the firm in 1949, which later assumed the name Holm-Nielsen & Plesner. The 1980s saw the first of a series of mergers with other law firms, which has led to the current company, known as Plesner since 2004.

== History ==
The firm was established in 1918 by Poul Jacobsen, Attorney-at-Law. In 1949, Kaj Holm-Nielsen and Mogens Plesner became partners and the firm became known as Holm-Nielsen & Plesner.

In 1989, the firm merged with Lunøe & Partnere to form Plesner & Lunøe. Lunøe & Partnere had itself been formed through the merger of Svend Lunøe and Carl Ricard's firms in 1987.

In 1997, the firm merged with Koch-Nielsen & Grønborg, a firm had been created through the merger of Bornstein & Grønborg (1964) and Cour & Koch-Nielsen (1967) in 1990. As a result of the merger, the firm became known as Plesner & Grønborg.

The firm became known as merged Plesner Svane Grønborg following its 2000 merger with O. Bondo Svane. The firm moved to its new office at the "Copper Tower", at Amerika Plads 37 in 2004. It officially simplified its name to Plesner in 2009.

== Corporate social responsibility ==
Plesner's CSR programme includes

- the School Project aimed at retaining children from lesser privileged areas of Copenhagen in school and keeping them focused on continued education
- a programme for developing and retaining talented female lawyers with the goal of increasing the percentage of the firm's woman partners.
