= Stefan Fölster =

Swedish economist and author

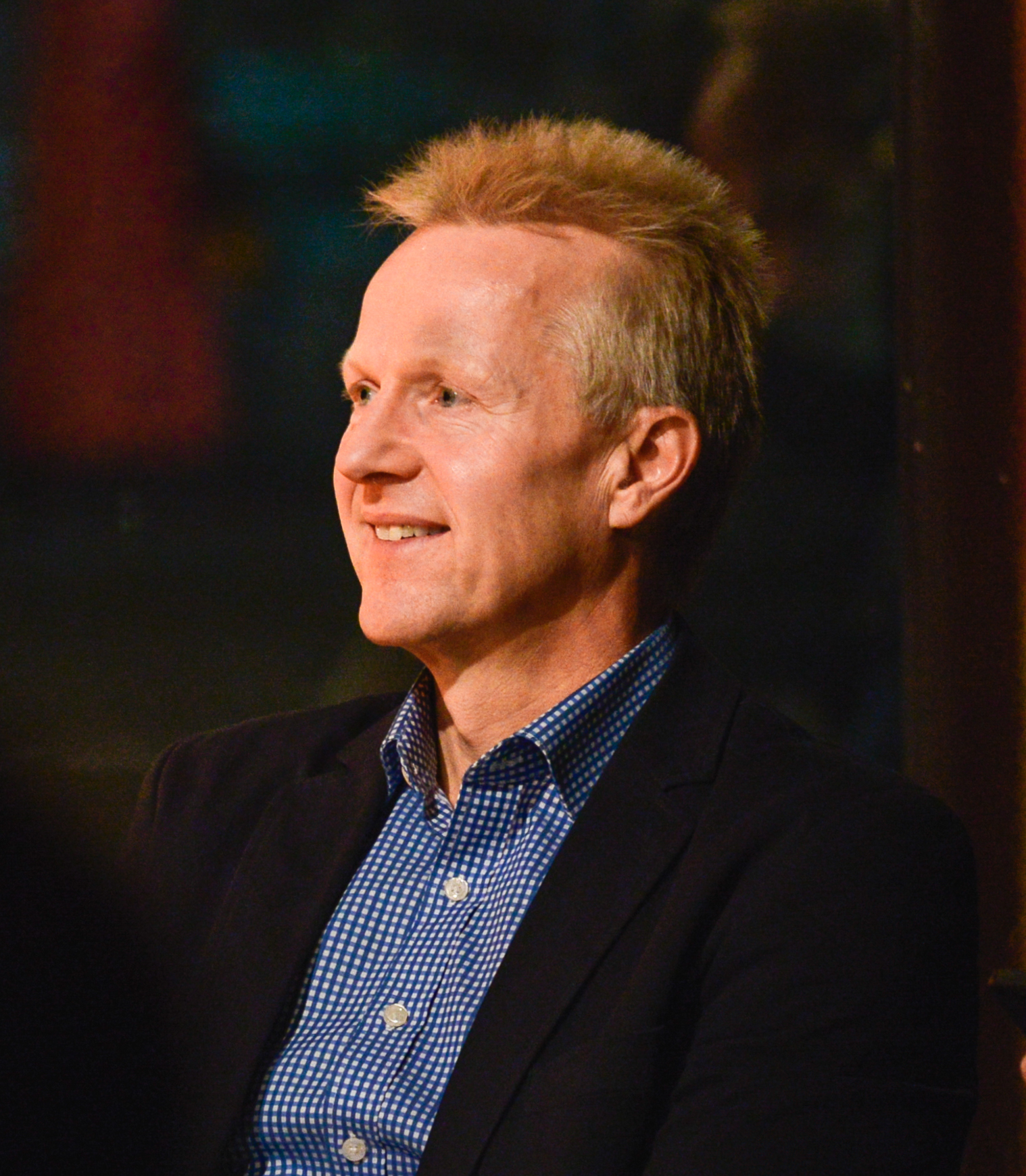
- Stefan Fölster in 2014
- Born: Germany
- Education: University of Oxford (DPhil); Harvard University (MA); UCLA (BA)
- Relatives: Gunnar and Alva Myrdal (maternal grandparents)
- Writing career
- Notable work: The Public Wealth of Nations
- Literary movement: New institutional economics

Stefan Fölster (born 23 June 1959) is a Swedish economist and author. He is the president of the Swedish Reform Institute and an associate professor at the KTH Royal Institute of Technology in Stockholm.

Fölster is the author and co-author of several books on economic reform, including Robotrevolutionen, which looks at the winners and losers in the digital age, and Renaissance of Reforms, that was based on an analysis of 109 governments that completed their term of power in OECD countries between the mid-1990s and 2012. With Dag Detter, Fölster wrote The Public Wealth of Nations: How Management of Public Assets Can Boost or Bust Economic Growth (Palgrave, 2015), included in The Economist — Books of the Year 2015 and the Financial Times, FT's Best Books of the Year 2015.

== Bibliography ==
- Reforming the Welfare State, University of Chicago, 2010; ISBN 9780226261928
- Entrepreneurship and Economic Growth, Edward Elgar Publishing, 2010; ISBN 978 1 84542 134 2
- The Welfare State in Europe - Challenges and Reforms, Edward Elgar Publishing, 2000; ISBN 978-9282821183
- (with Sam Peltzman) "The Social Costs of Regulation and Lack of Competition in Sweden: A Summary" in The Welfare State in Transition: Reforming the Swedish Model, Chicago University, 1997; ISBN 0-226-26178-6
