= Dahlerup Warehouse =

Warehouse building in Copenhagen, Denmark

Dahlerups Pakhus
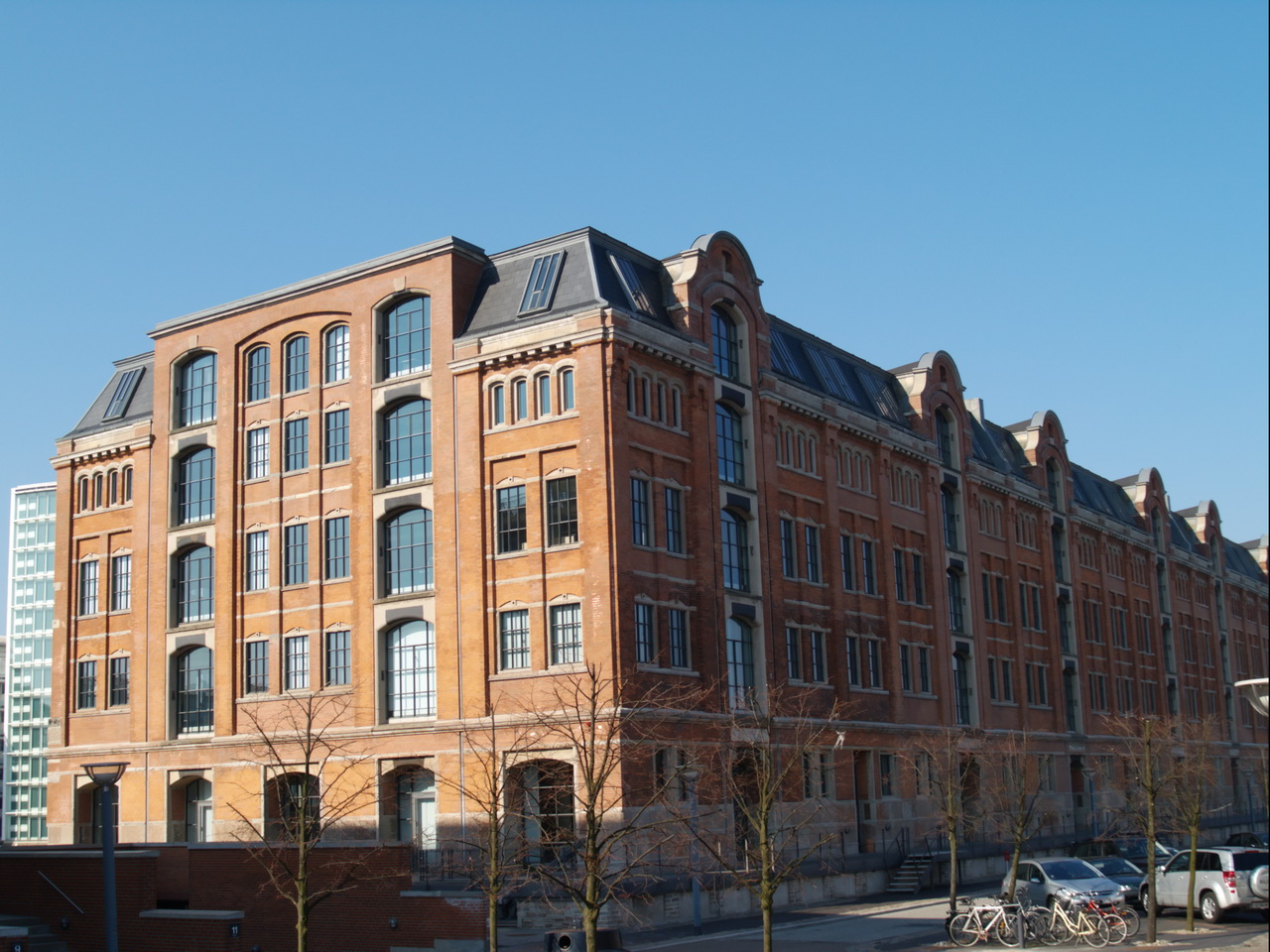
- The Dahlerup Warehouse seen from the north

General information
- Architectural style: Historicism
- Location: Copenhagen, Denmark
- Coordinates: 55°41′51″N 12°35′59″E
- Completed: 1894
- Client: Copenhagen Freeport

Design and construction
- Architect: Vilhelm Dahlerup

Dahlerups Pakhus (English: Dahlerup Warehouse), originally known as Pakhus 1 (English: Warehouse 1), is a former Warehouse situated on the west side of the Langelinie Pier, opposite the Middle Pier, in Copenhagen, Denmark. Designed by Vilhelm Dahlerup, from whom it now takes its name, it was built between 1892 and 1893.

== History ==
The Dahlerup Warehouse was originally known as Warehouse 1 and built as part of the Freeport of Copenhagen which was constructed during the first half of the 1890s.

After the free port was closed the building remained in use as a warehouse for a while but then fell into disrepair and was left empty for almost 30 years.

In the 1990s it was thoroughly renovated and is now listed as a landmark.

== The Dahlerup Warehouse today ==
The building now houses the Danish Business Authority, a government agency under the Ministry of Industry, Business and Financial Affairs.

== Gallery ==
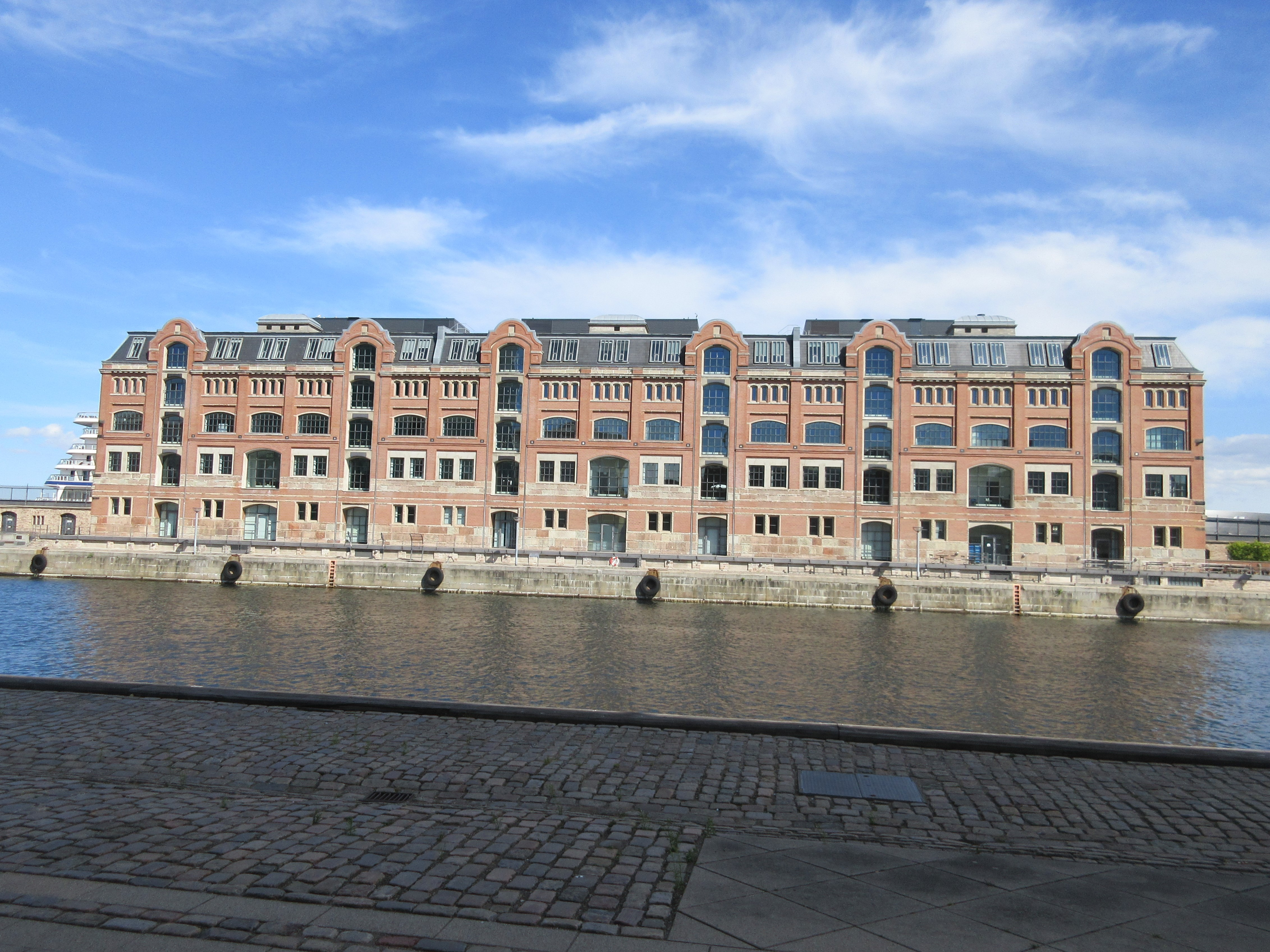
The warehouse viewed from Midtermolen.
