= Alm. Brand =

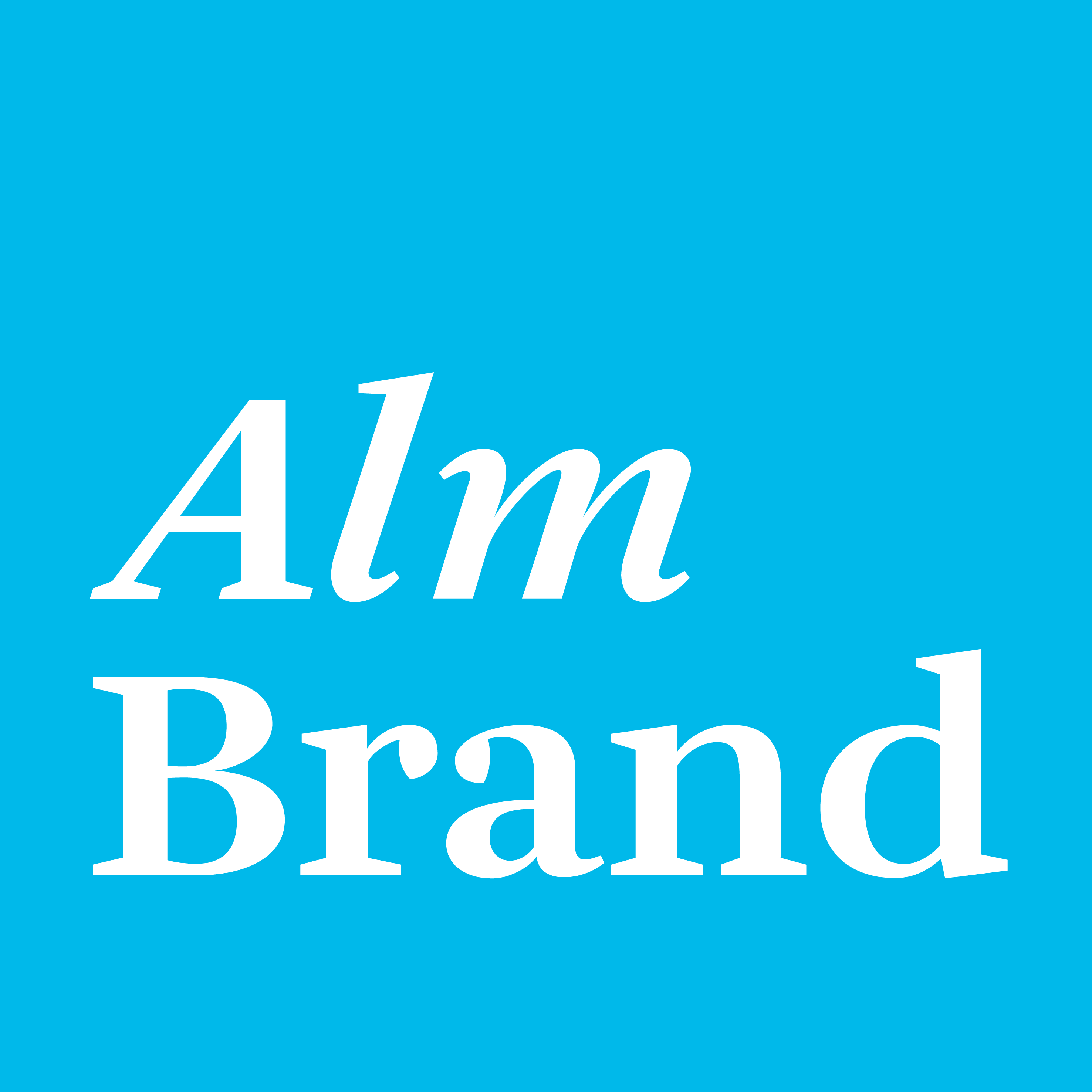
- Type: Aktieselskab
- Industry: Financial services
- Founded: 1792
- Headquarters: Copenhagen, Denmark
- Key people: Andreas Ruben Madsen; CEO
- Products: General insurance services
- Total assets: 368,690,000,000 Danish krone (2022)
- Number of employees: 2,294 (2022)
- Website: almbrand.dk

Alm. Brand (until 2002 Alm. Brand af 1792) is a Danish financial services group operating within the markets for non-life, life and pension insurance.

== History ==
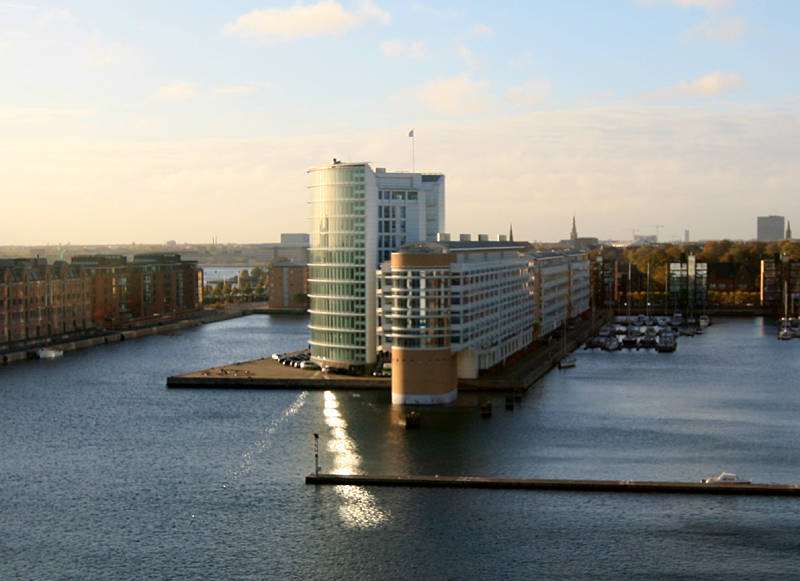
Alm. Brand's headquarters in Copenhagen's former Freeport

The company was founded in 1792 and its activities were originally limited to mutual fire insurance of buildings in rural communities. Since 1987, Alm. Brand has been based in Company House on Middle Pier in the Southern Freeport area of Copenhagen. The building was designed by PLH Architects and previously housed East Asiatic Company.

In October 2020, Sydbank acquires Alm. Brand Bank for €250 million from the company.

In May 2022, it was announced Alm. Brand had acquired Codan Forsikring A/S’s Danish business - Codan Denmark from Intact Financial and Tryg A/S.

== Structure ==
Alm. Brand af 1792 fmba, is a limited liability association, holds a 56,8 % share of the shares in the Group. All non-life insurance customers of the Alm. Brand Group are born members of the association.

=== Subsidiaries ===
- Alm. Brand Arbejdsskade A/S
- Alm. Brand Liv A/S
- Alm. Brand Leasing
