= Freeport of Copenhagen =

District of Copenhagen, Denmark

Coordinates: 55.7058°N 12.5961°E

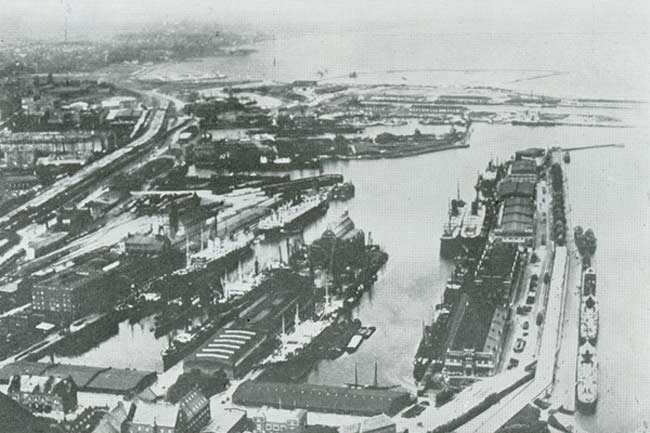
Aerial from 1926 showing the free port from the south: Two passenger ships of the Scandinavian America Line are docked at the West Quay and one of East Asiatic Company's ships is seen in the East Basin

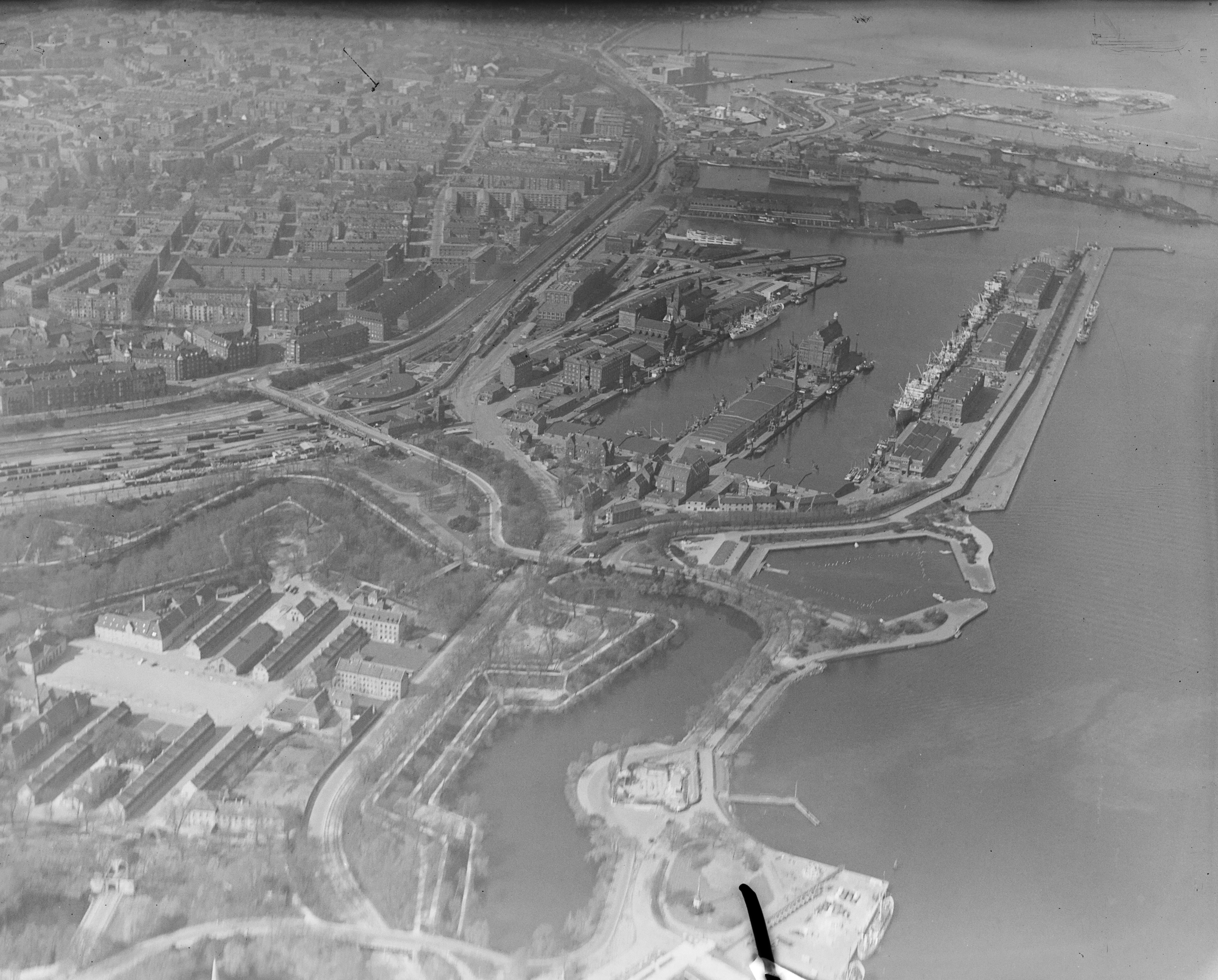
Aerial from 1953

The Free Port of Copenhagen is a bonded area in the northern part of Port of Copenhagen of Copenhagen, Denmark. Created to consolidate Copenhagen's position as an important maritime hub in Northern Europe, it was established in the area just north of the fortress Kastellet and later expanded northwards several times. The original grounds, now known as Søndre Frihavn (English: South Free Port), has since been released for other uses. It comprises Amerika Plads, a modern mixed-use development, America Quay, India Quay, Langelinie and Marble Pier, the four quays which bounded the harbour, and Midtermolen, a pier which divides it into an east and west basin.

The free port is now located in Nordhavnen and is part of Copenhagen Malmö Port.

== History ==
=== Planning and construction ===
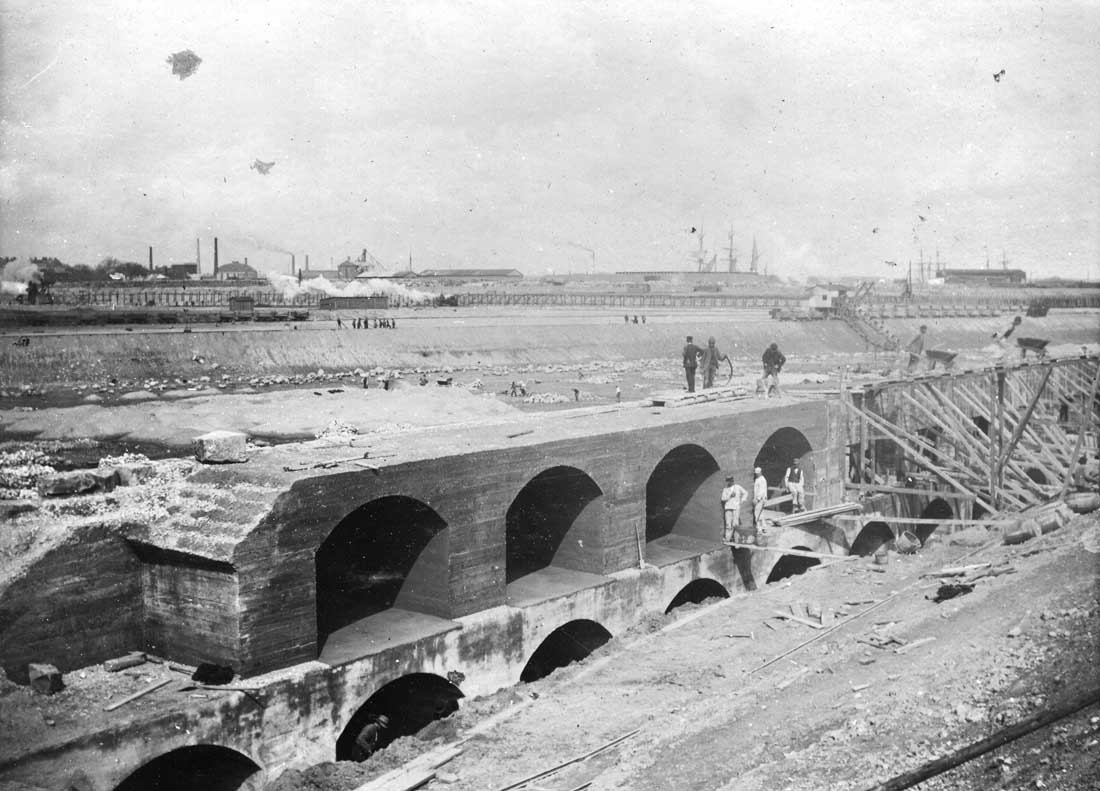
The Freeport under construction

In the middle of the 19th century, Copenhagen's growth and the increasing industrialization made it clear that the city's harbour was becoming too small and in the same time old plans to create a free port were revitalized. In a plan from 1862 it was decided to dig out the area to allow access for the largest ocean-going vessels and use the materials removed for land fills along the coast. A suggestion to make all of Amager into a duty-free zone was abolished and instead it was decided to create a free port in the area in the Svanemølle Bay north of the fortress Kastellet. Construction began in 1891, prompted by Germany's construction of the Kiel Canal that was begun in 1887 and threatened Copenhagen's position.

=== Management and use ===
The new free port was inaugurated on 9 November 1894. A private limited company, Københavns Frihavns-Aktieselskab (KFA), was given a concession on operating the port by the Ministry of Interior Affairs. All shares in the Free Port Company was taken over by Port Authority in 1951 and the company was dissolved and replaced by Københavns Frihavns- og Stevedoreselskab A/S in 1879.

=== Expansions ===
In 1915–15, the free port was expanded with a new basin, Jronløn Basin (Danish: Kronløbsbasinet), located to the north. It blocked the access to the Kalkbrænderihavnen dock, making it necessary to dig out a new access canal to it. The next expansion of the free port took place between 1919 and 1931, creating the harbour basin now known as Orient Basin.

=== Late history ===
The free port left its original grounds in 1985. An architectural competition was launched for the future use of the area. Among the entries were a proposal from Jørn Utzon which included a highrise and several other buildings on Langelinie Pier but none of the submissions were realized. The Amerika Plads area was redeveloped in the 2000s.

The free port is now located in Nordhavnen and is part of Copenhagen Malmö Port.

== Layout and key figures ==
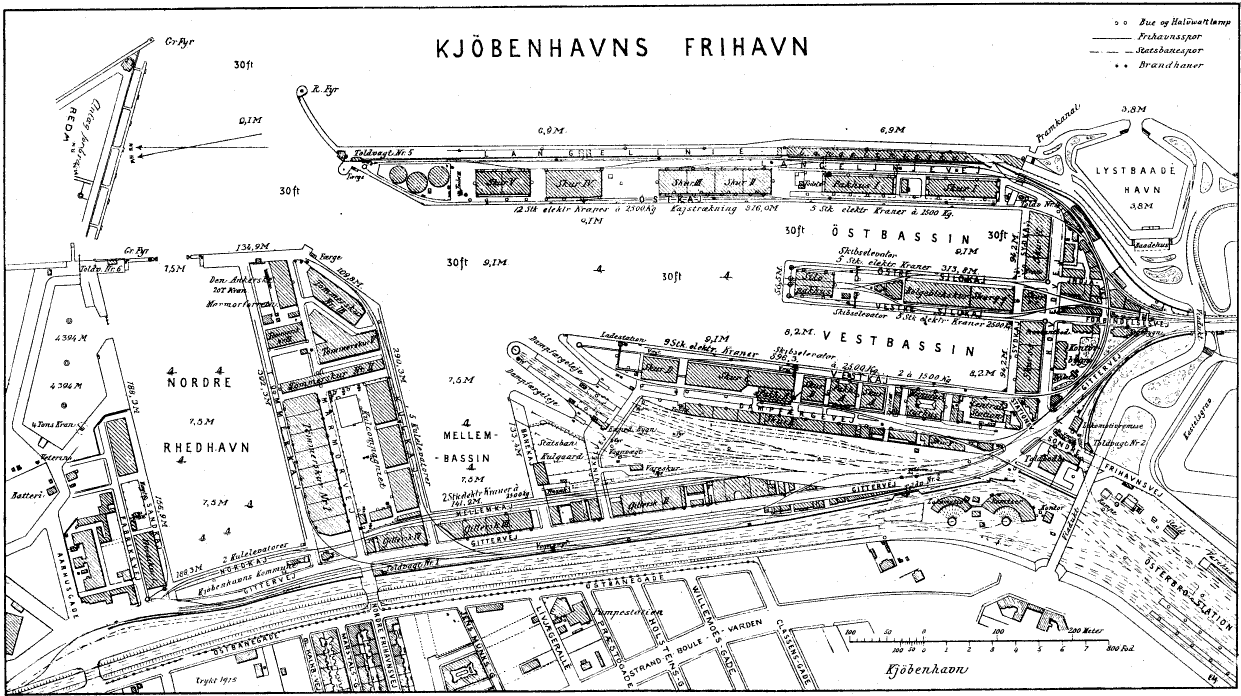
The Freeport in 1915. Note: North is left.

The original free port was designed by Holger Christian Valdemar Møller, who later served as managing director of the Free Port Company, based on an initial proposal drafted by the politician and engineer Holger Hammerich. It consists of a West Quay (now America Quay, a South Quay (now India Quay and an East Pier (now Langelinie), together forming an enclosed dock which was entered from the north. A shorter pier, Midtermolen (Rnglish: Middle Pier), extended north from South Quay, separating the harbour into an east and a west basin. Only the west side of East Pier was part of the free port. The east side of the pier was used for recreational purposes as a replacement of the promenade which had previously followed the coastline. The two sides were separated from each other by the Langelinie Promenade, a raised promenade constructed on top of a long row of low warehouses. The dock is to the north closed by the Marble Pier, leaving only a narrow entrance in the north-east.

In 1931, after the second expansion had been completed, the free port covered a total area of 82.5 hectares of which 49.1 hectares were land and 33.4 hectares were water. The total length of the quays was approximately 4,770 metres with water depth between 7.5 m to 9.5 m.

== Buildings and features ==
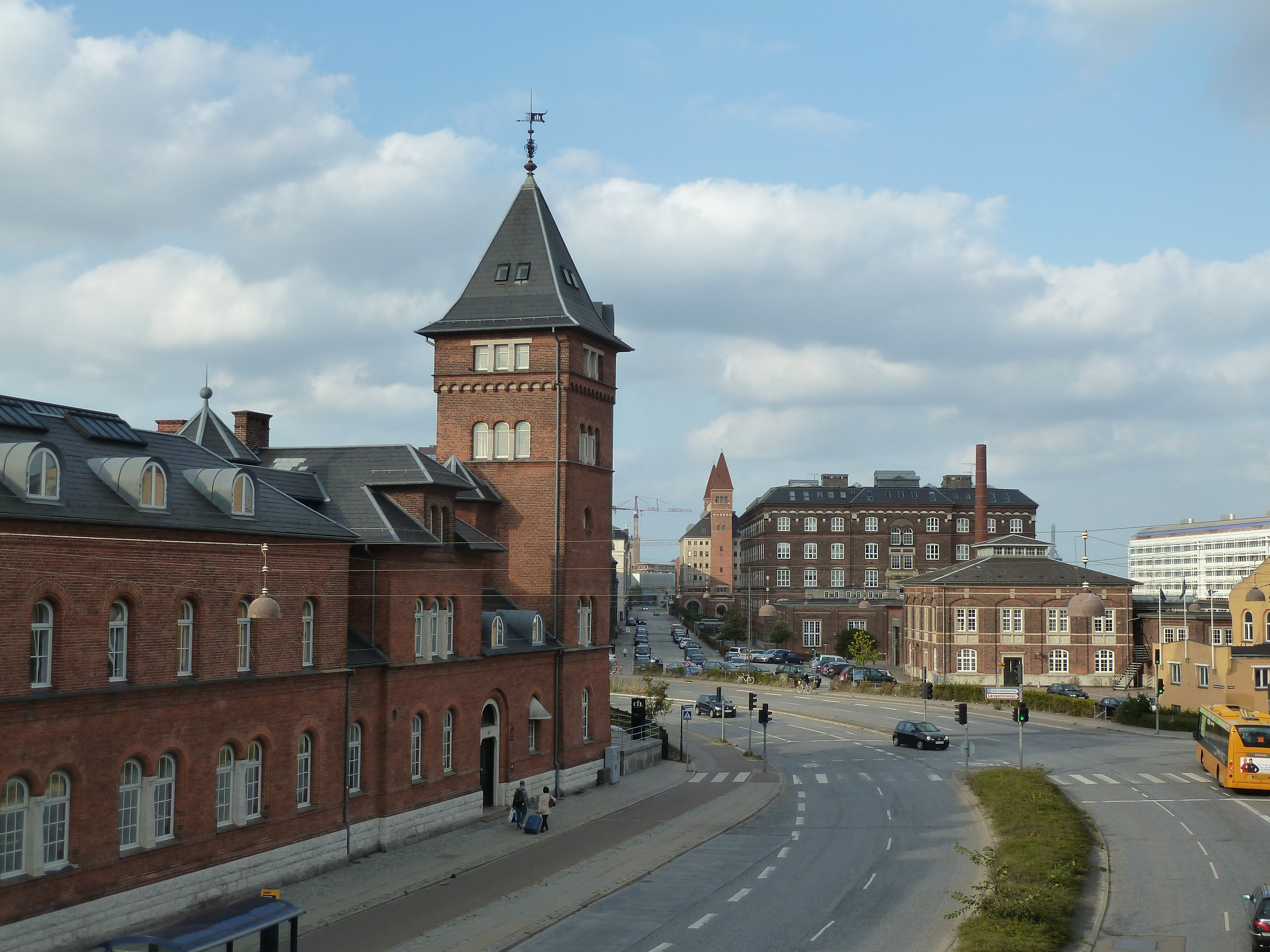
The Custom House (left) with the Central Power Station, Manufakturhuset, and Silo Warehouse in the background

=== Custom Guard Building ===
The Custom Guard Building (Danish: Toldvagten) was built in 1894 to designs by Erik Schiødt. It was expanded in 1918 by J.C.M. Agerskov and again in 1932 with a three storey extension designed by John Dich. The complex was listed in 1988.

=== Central Power Station ===
The Central Power Station (Danish:Frihavnens Elektriske Centralstation) was built in 1894-95 to designs by Vilhelm Dahlerup. A boilerhouse with a detached chimney designed by Frederik L. Levy was added in 1899. A workshop building designed by Henning Jørgensen is from 1913.

=== Dahlerup's warehouses ===
Dahlerup also designed many other buildings in the original free port, including warehouses, guardhouses, quays and the fence which surrounded the area. Warehouse I on Langelinie Pier is now known as the Dahlerup Warehouse after him and is listed. Another warehouse on Middle pier, which for decades was a prominent landmark in the Free Port area, was demolished after a fire in 1968.

=== Manufaktorhuset ===
Manufakturhuset at 8-10 Dampfærgevej was designed by Frederik L. Levy, and built in 1899. The architectural firm PLH Arkitekter is among the companies which are based in the building.

=== Silo Warehouse ===
The Silo Warehouse was completed in 1903 to designs by Frederik L. Levy. It was listed in 1985. It is colloquially known as the Cathedral of the Free Port due to its twin towers. Adapted and expanded by Erik Møller Architects in 1993, it now houses Danish Regions.

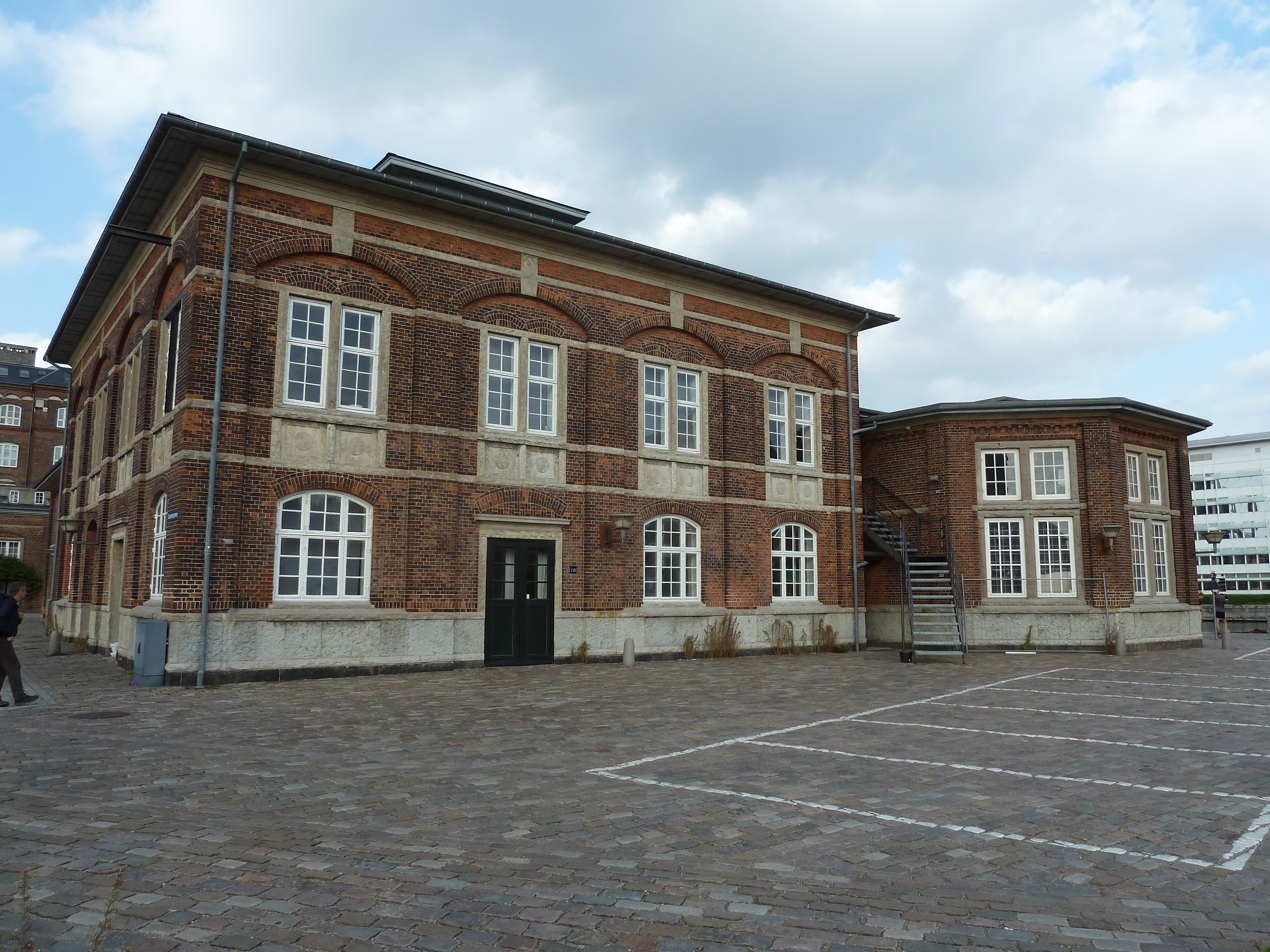
The Central Power Station

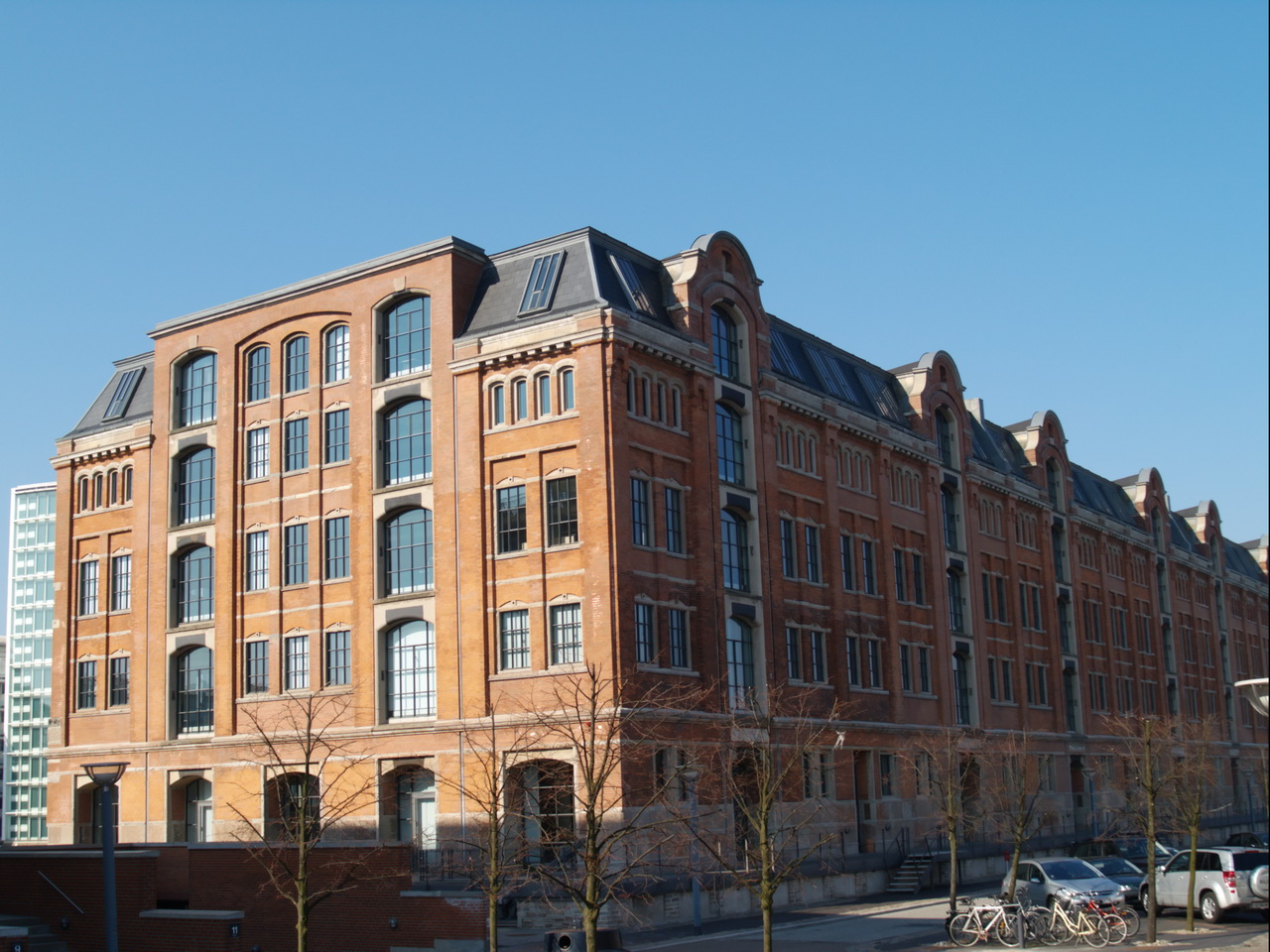
Dahlerup Warehouse at Langelinie Pier

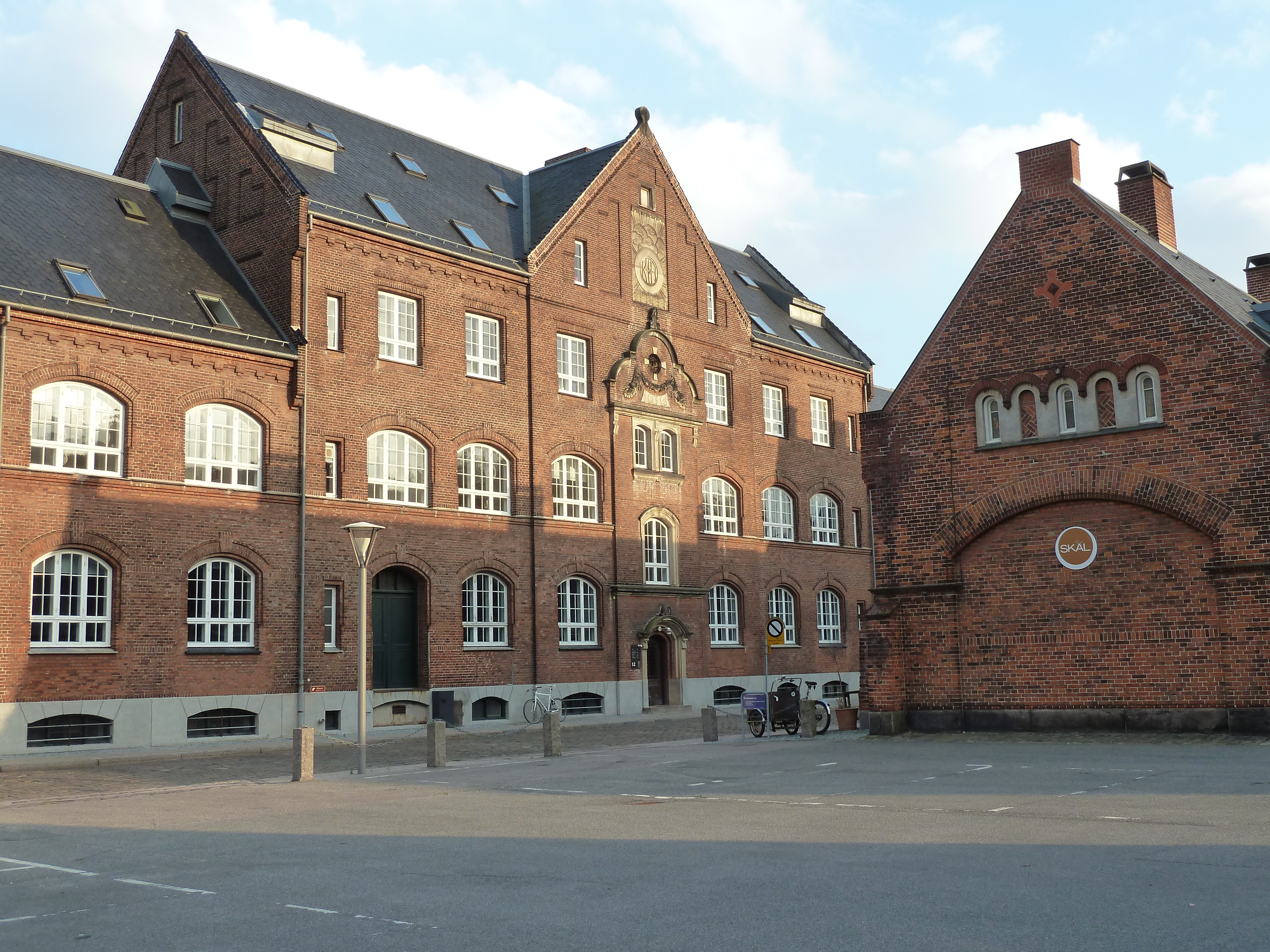
The former Head Office

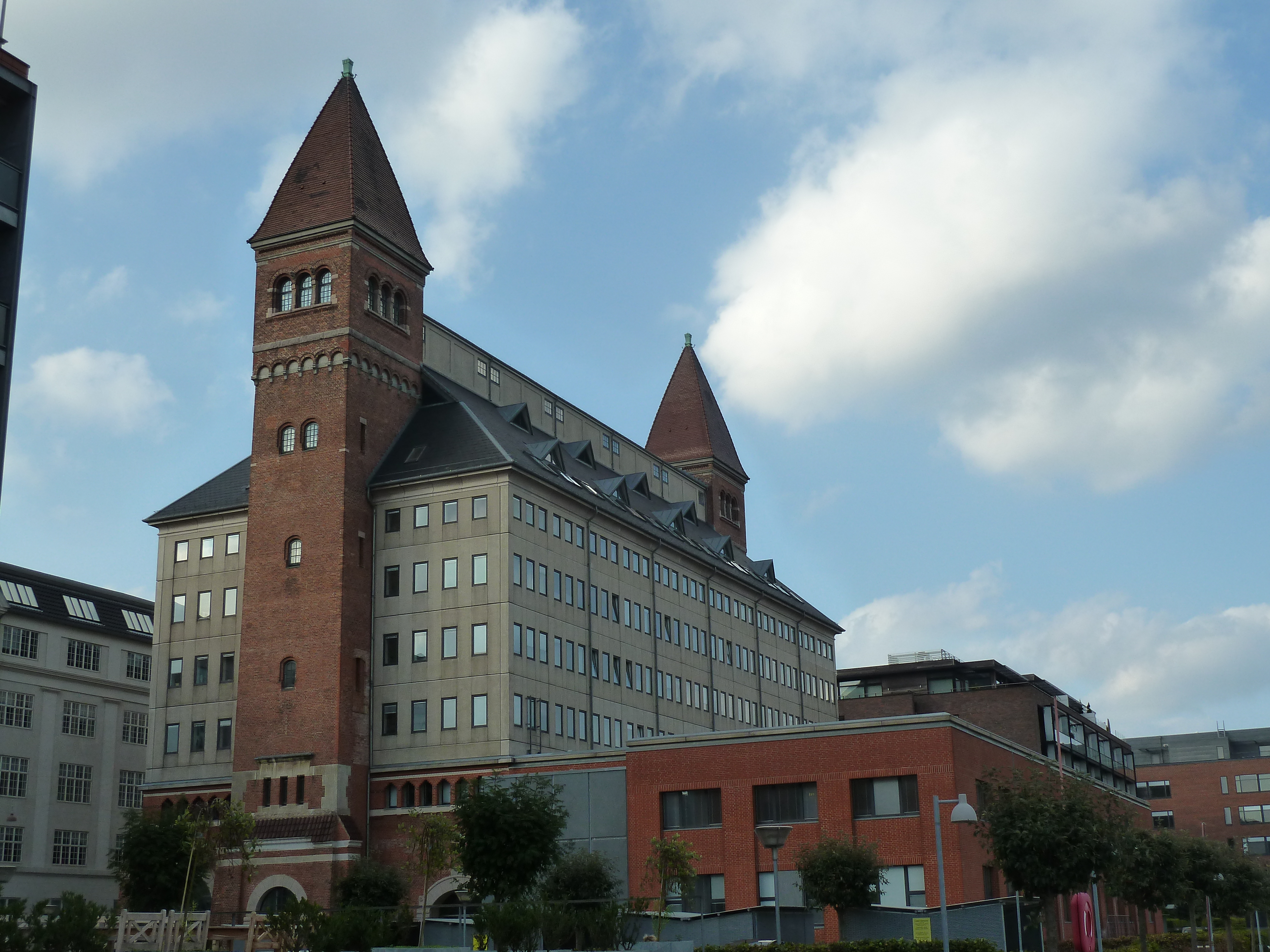
The Silo Warehouse
