= Indiakaj =

Street and quay in Copenhagen, Denmark

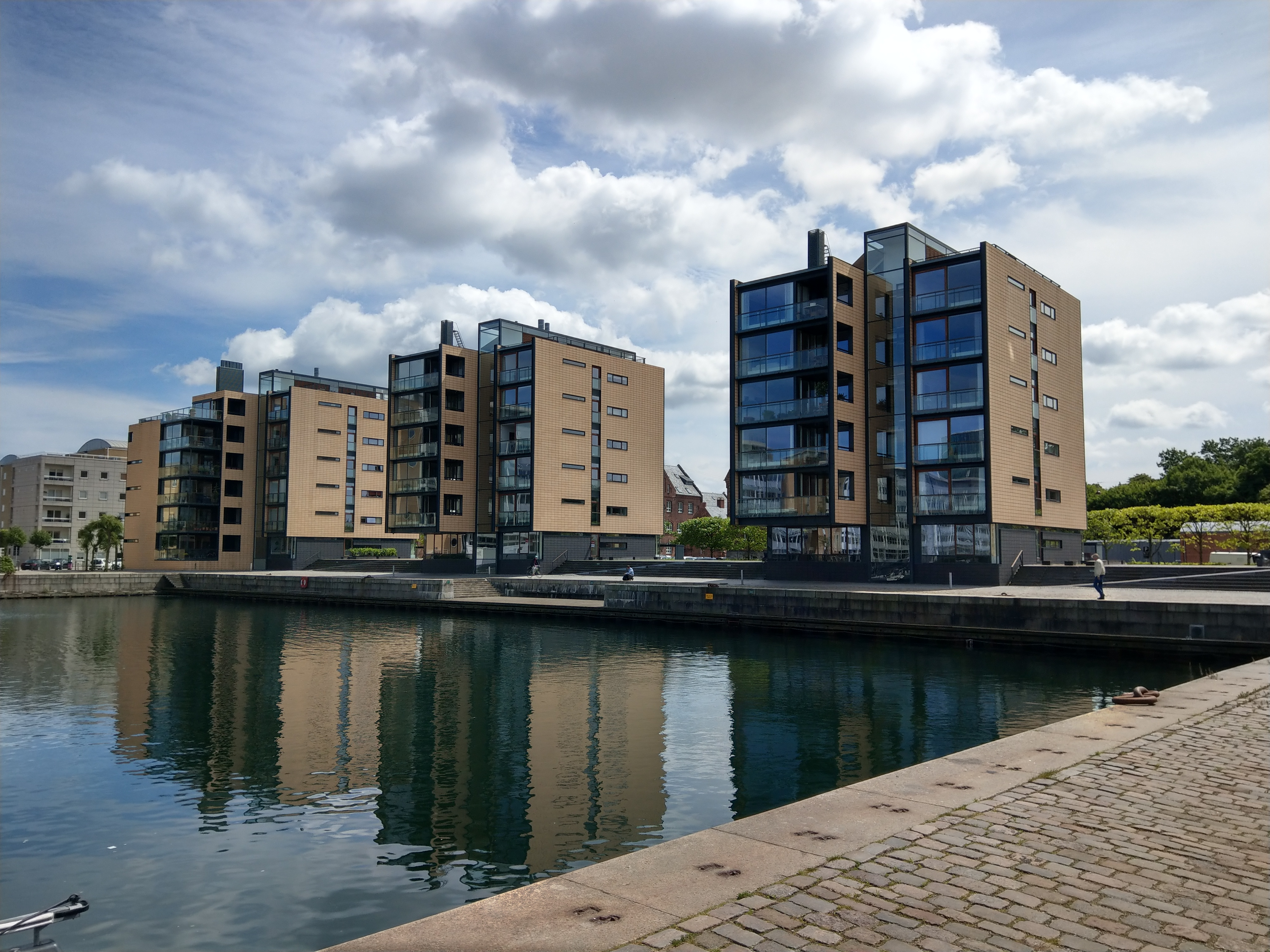
- Indiakaj viewed from Amerikakaj
- Length: 300 m (980 ft)
- Location: Copenhagen, Denmark
- Postal code: 2100
- Coordinates: 55°41′43.08″N 12°34′47.76″E

Indiakaj (lit. 'India Quay') is a quay and adjacent street which marks the southern boundary of the Søndre Frihavn (English: South Freeport) area of Copenhagen, Denmark. It originates in the west at Kalkbrænderihavnsvej and continue east to a roundabout at the base of Langelinie PPierer.

The former head office of the Free Port Company is sited on the south side of the street along with a number of other associated with the free port, which definitively left the area in 1986.

== History ==
Formerly known simply as Hovedvej (English: Main Road), the street was the principal artery of the new free port which was established in the 1890s. Complementing Vest Kaj /West Quay, now America Quay) and Østmolen (East Pier, now Langelinie), the quay was originally simply known as Syd Kaj (South Quay). The name Indiakaj was introduced in the 1960s. The name Indiavej (English: India Rioad) for another street in the area goes back to 1907 and refers to East Asiatic Company's first headquarters.

== Buildings and residents ==
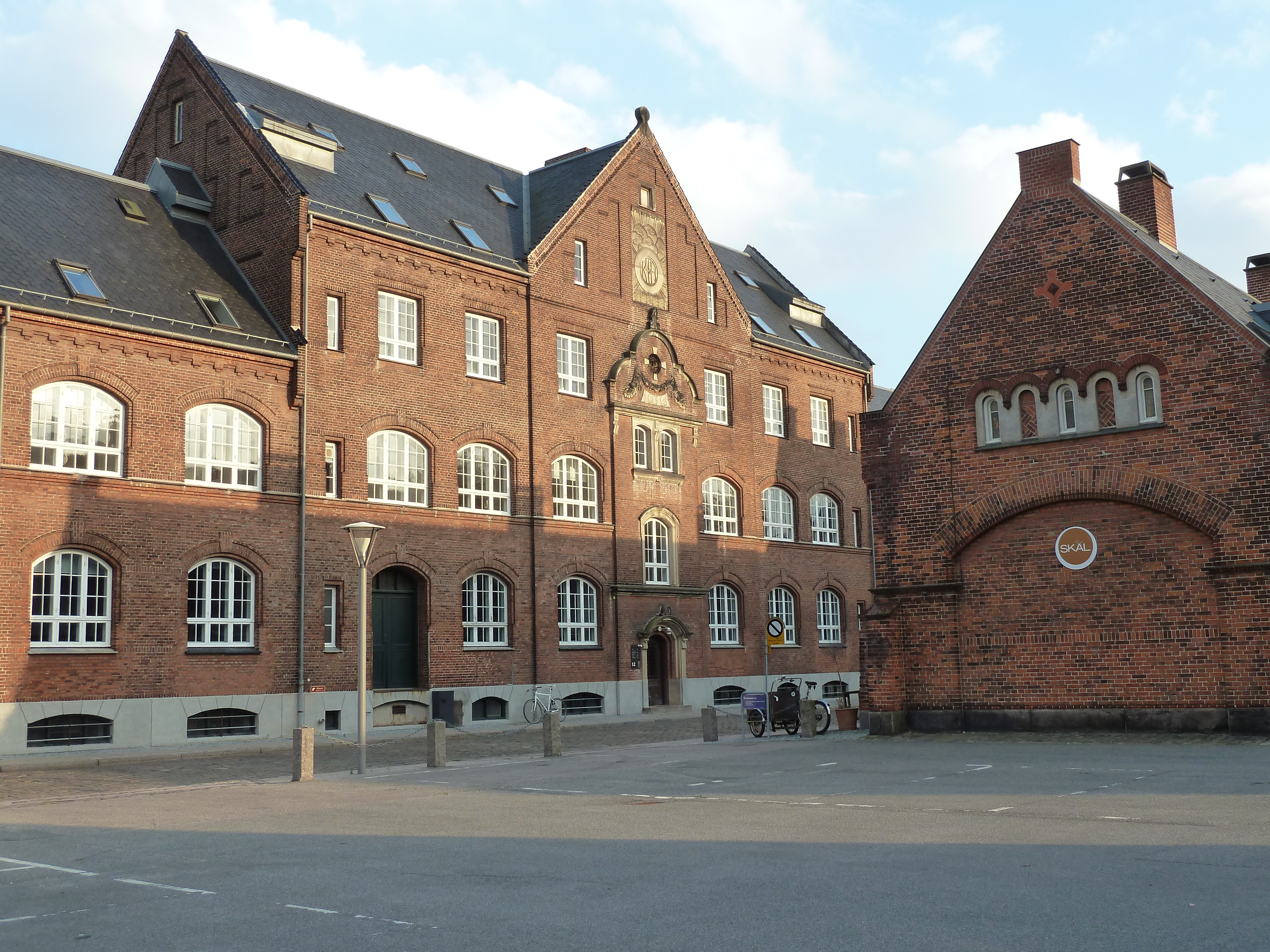
The former headquarters of the Free Port Company (KFA) and one of the Proviantboderne buildings to the right

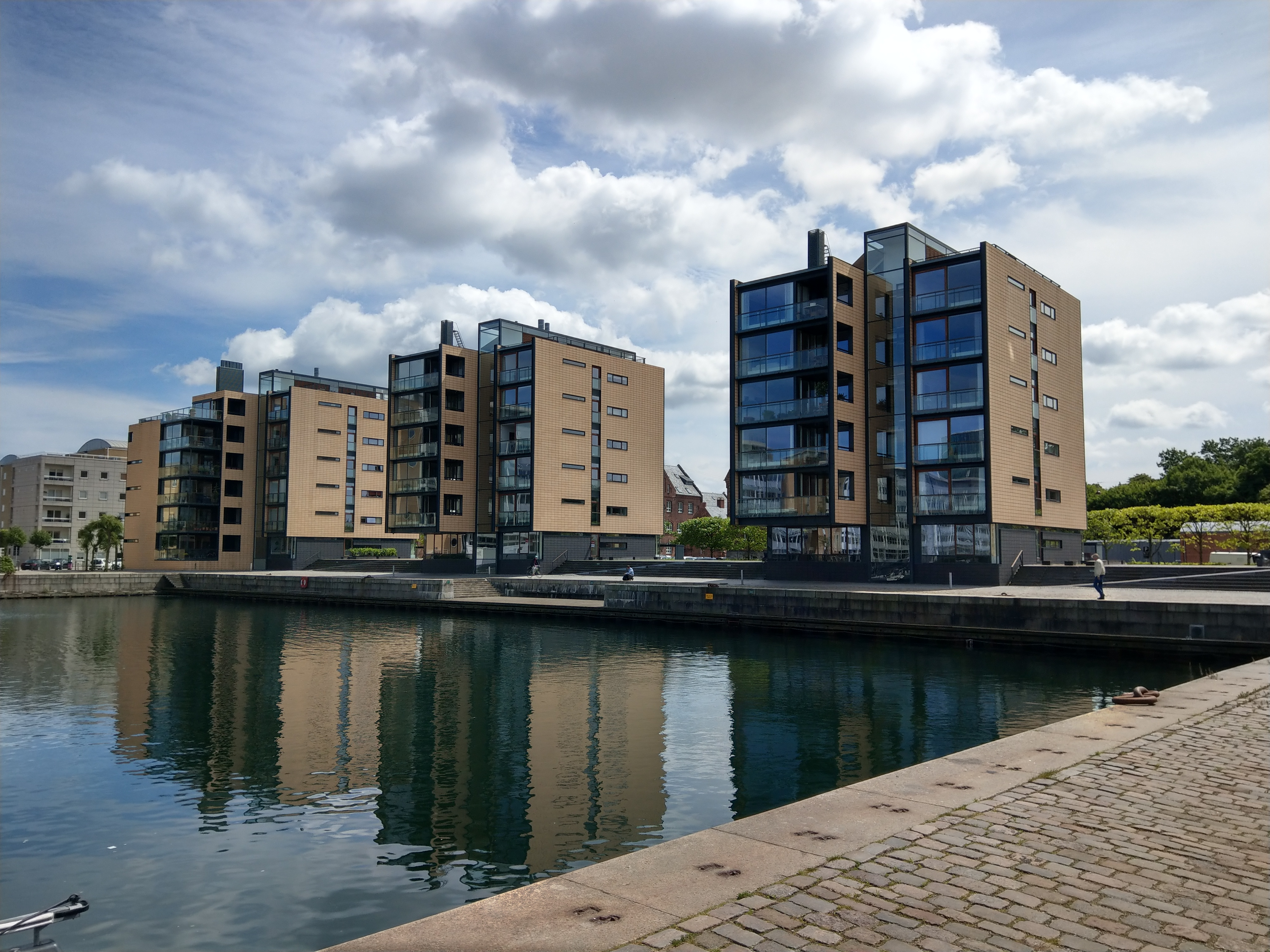
The Schmidt Hammer Lassen-designed apartment buildings fronting the water

The area to the south of the street is scattered with low red brick buildings which date associated with the free port. Most were built between 1891 and 1898 to designs by Erik Schiødte. They include the former head office of the Free Port Company, residences for employees and the Proviantboderne buildings.

Built in 1917 to designs by Jahn Dich, No. 2 was the free port's post and telegraph building. East Asiatic Company's first head office is located at Bo. 16.

On the north side of the street, No. 1 was built as canteen for Carlsberg's workers. It was designed by Thorvald Bindesbøll and built 1899–1900.

The apartment buildings facing the water were built in 1999 to designs by schmidt hammer lassen.

== Image gallery ==
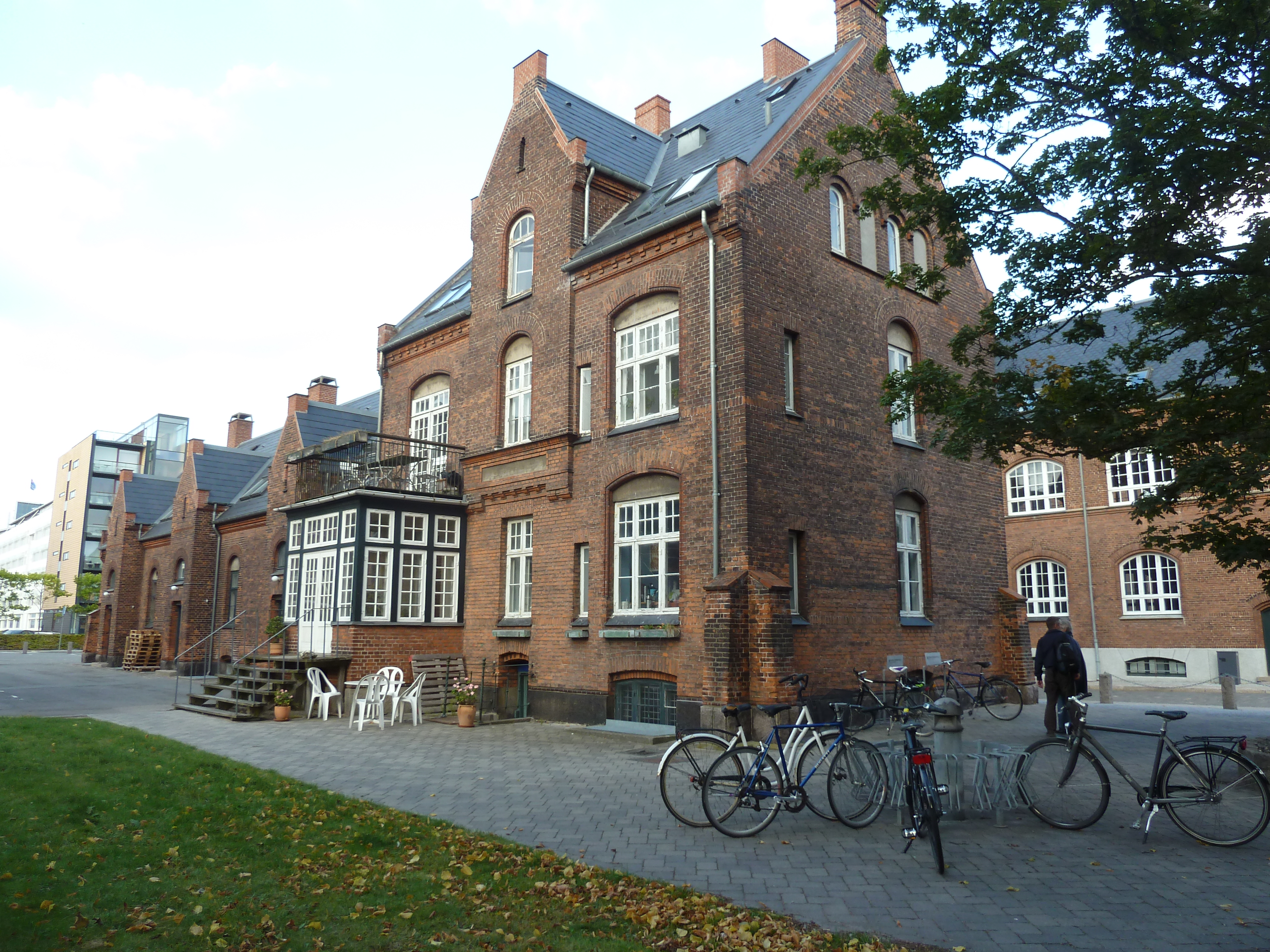
Residential building with Indiakaj in the background

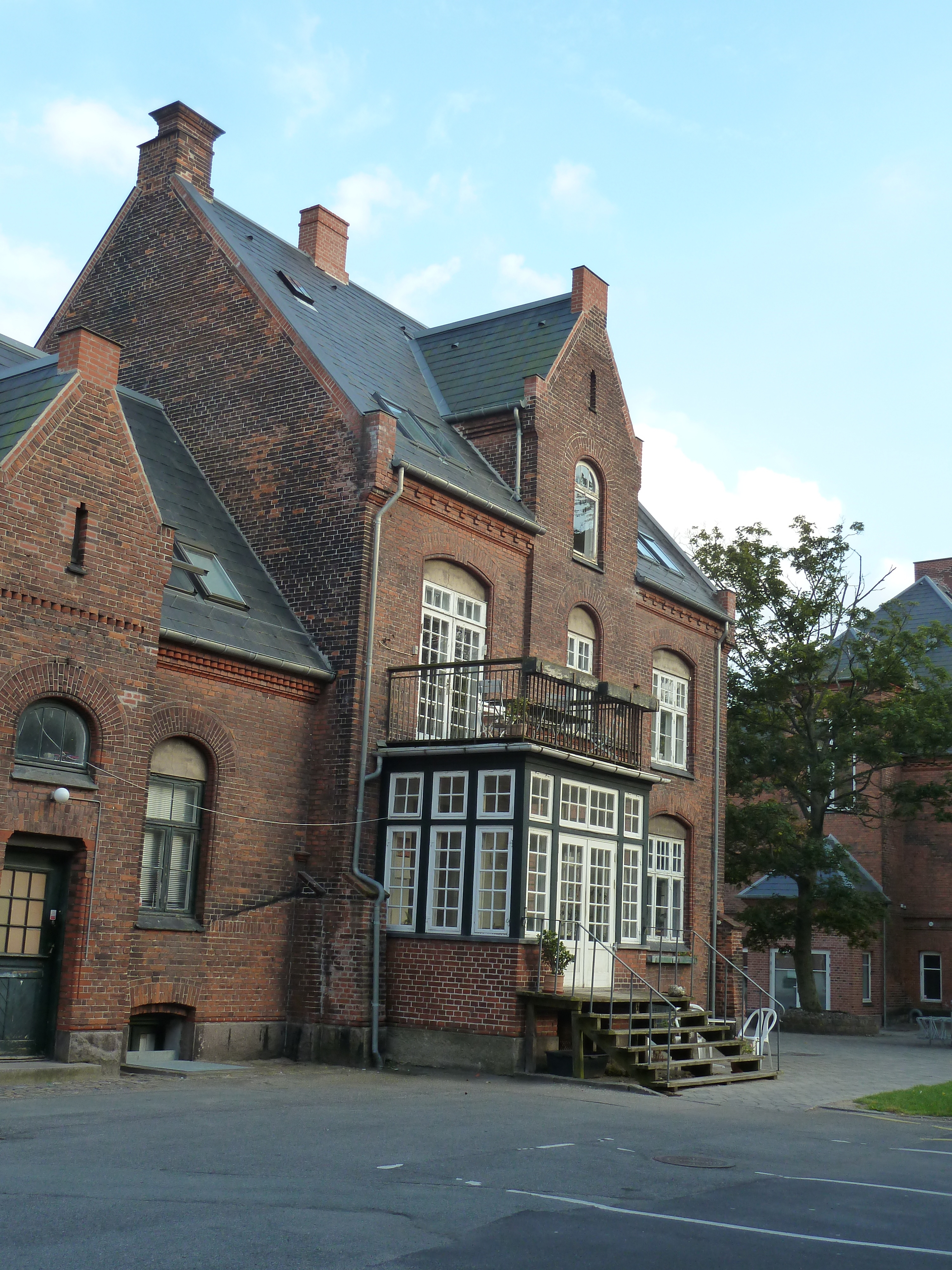
Building at Forbindelsesvej

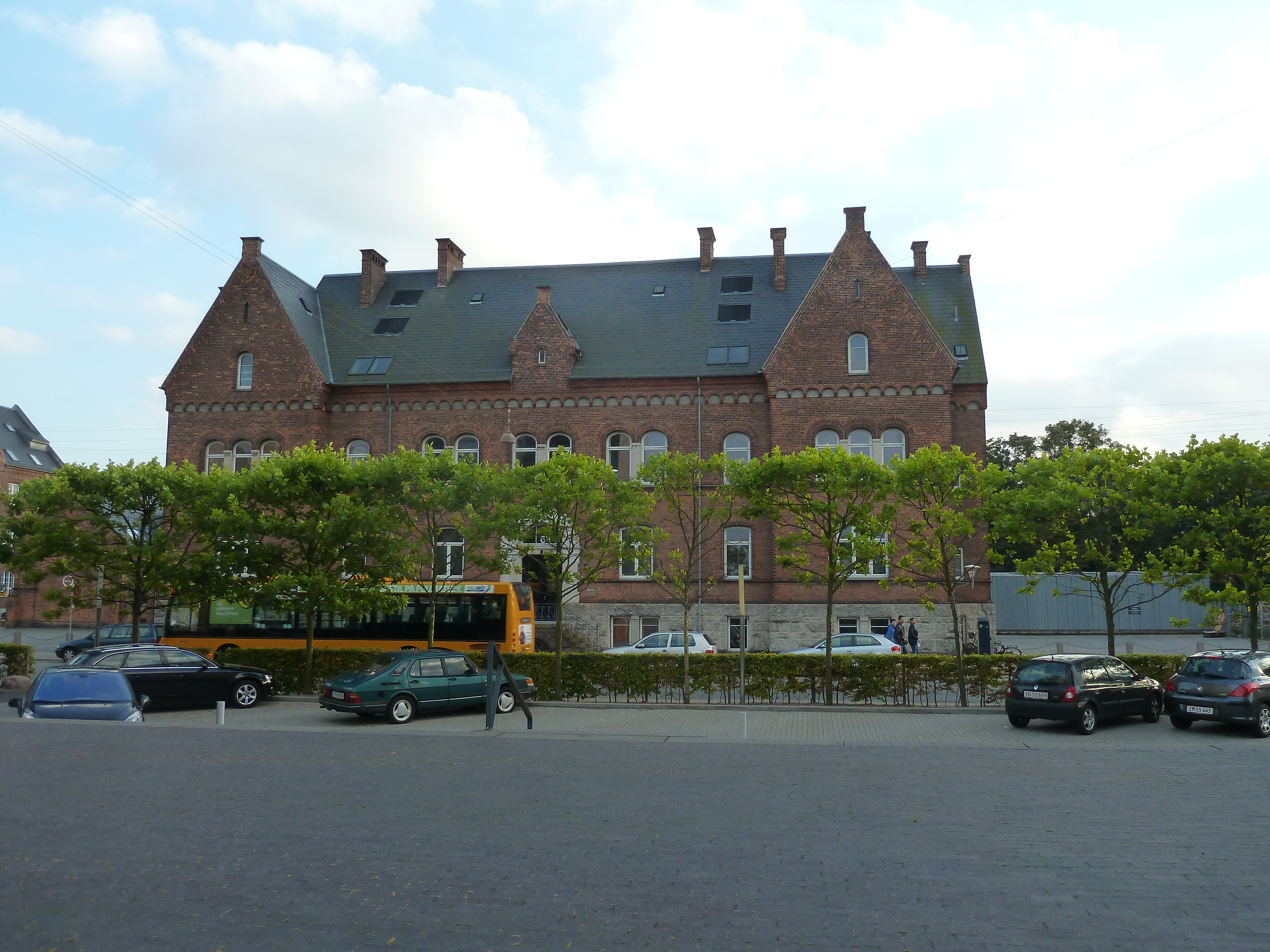
6 Indiakaj

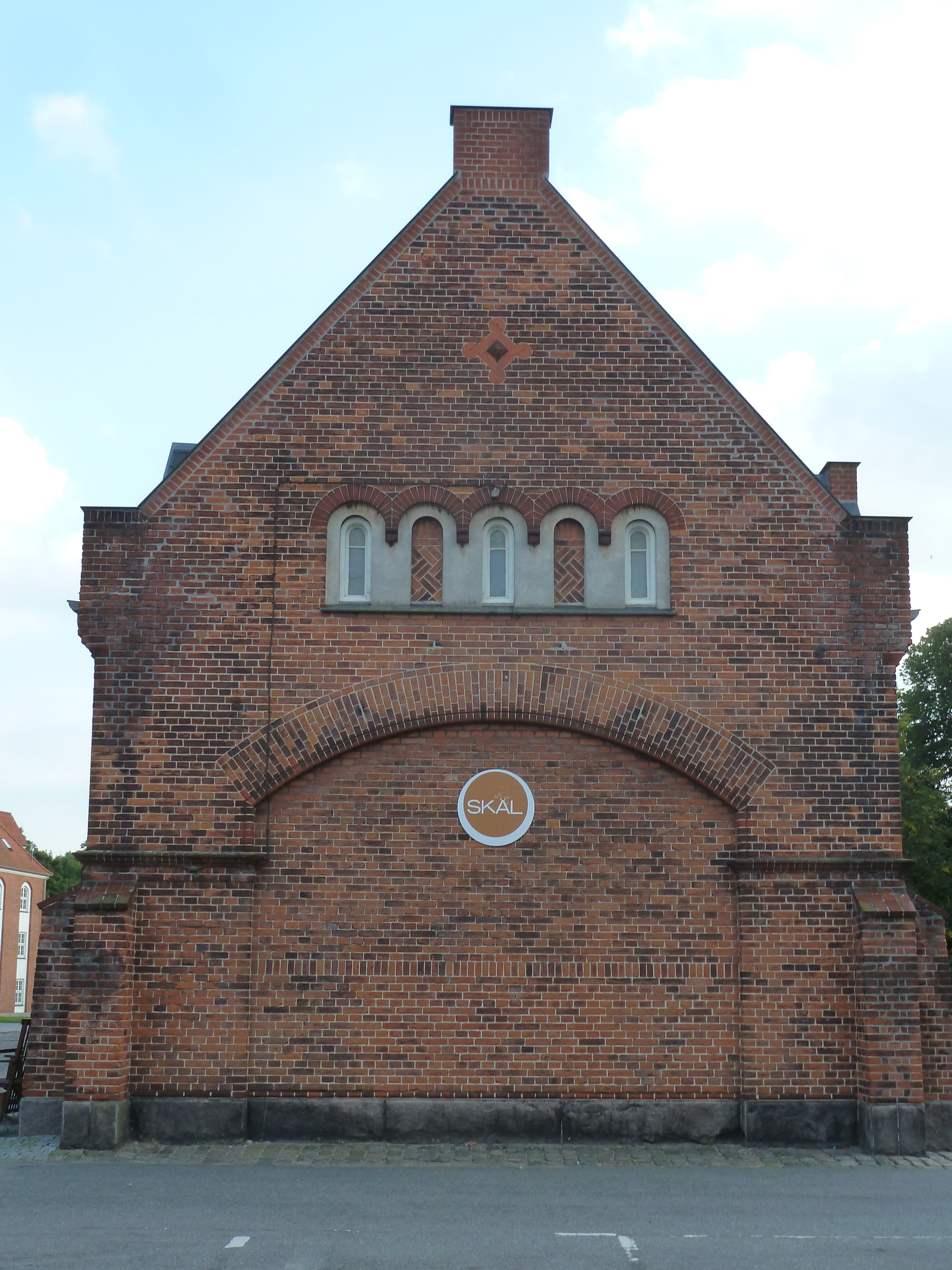
The gable of one of the Proviantboderne buildings

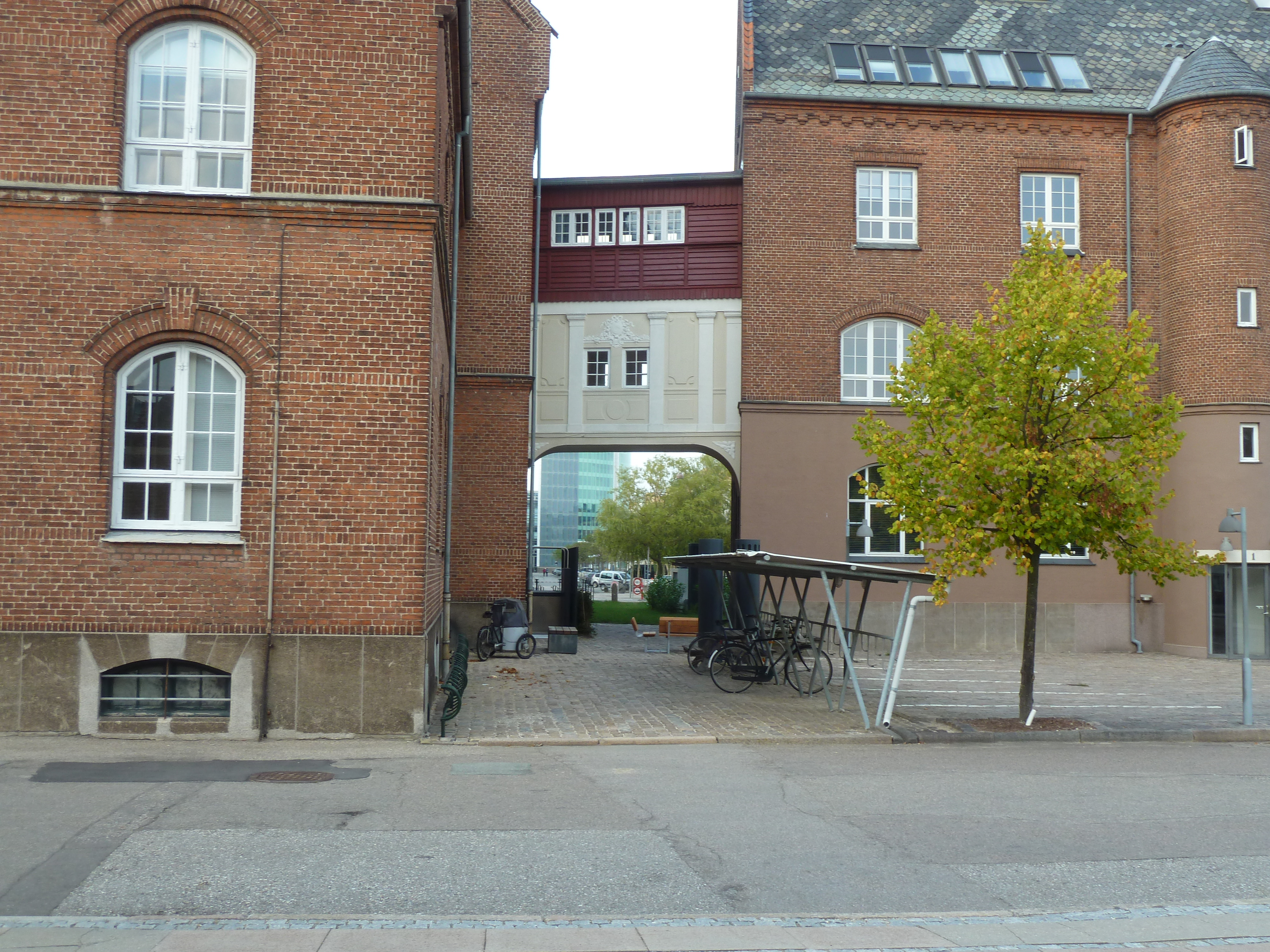
The skywalk between 10 and 12 Indiakaj

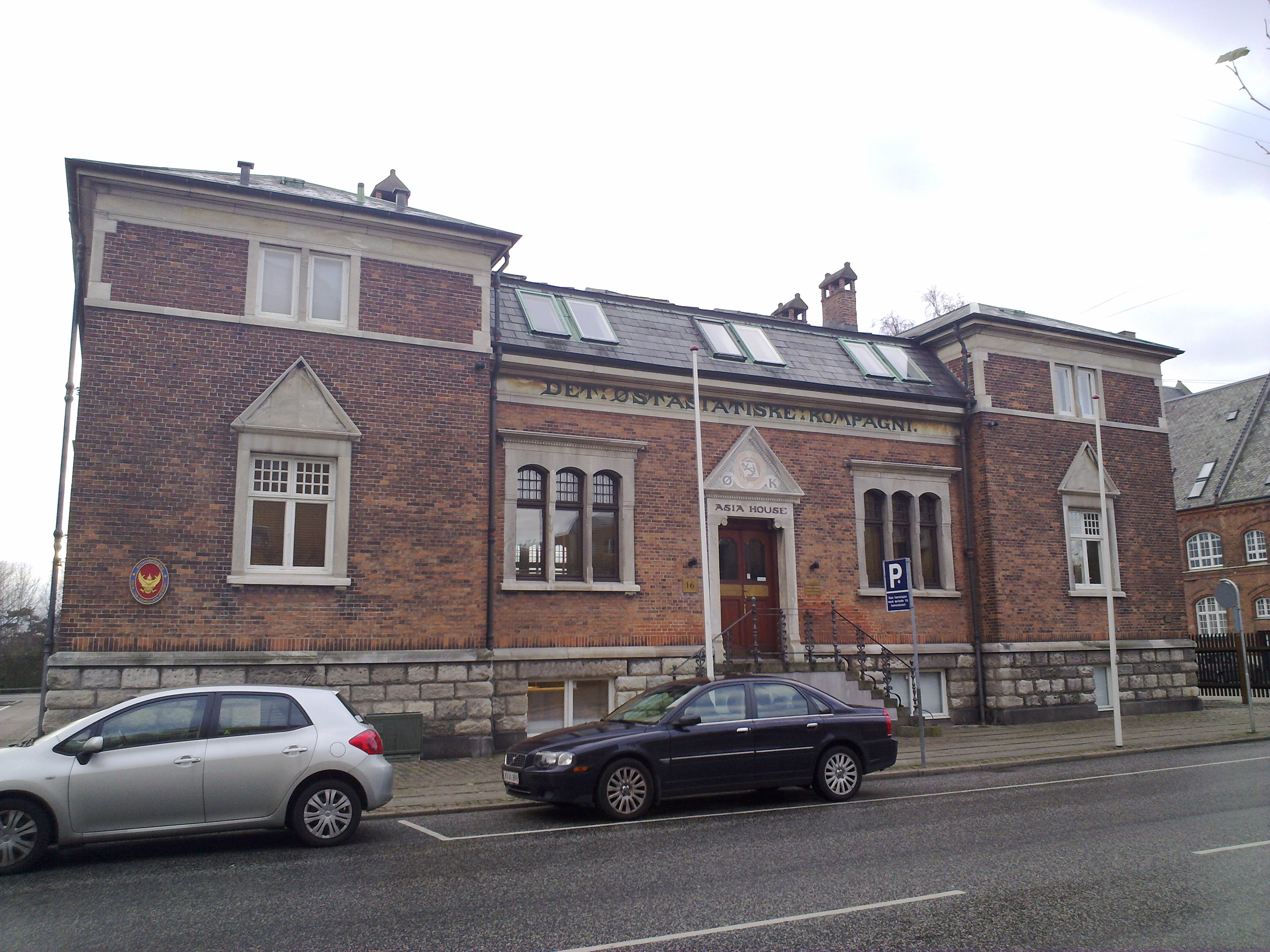
Asia House at 16 Indiakaj

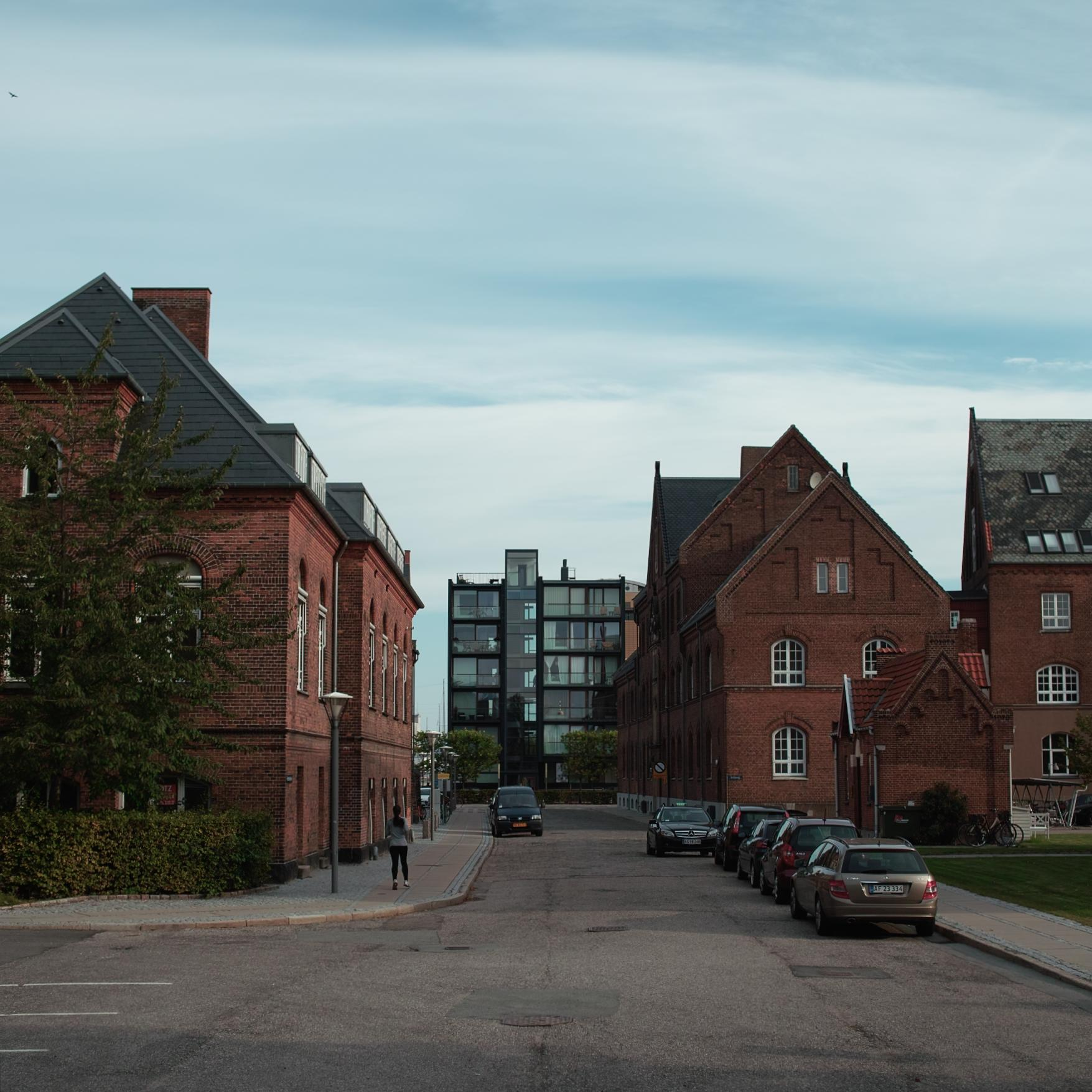
New and old

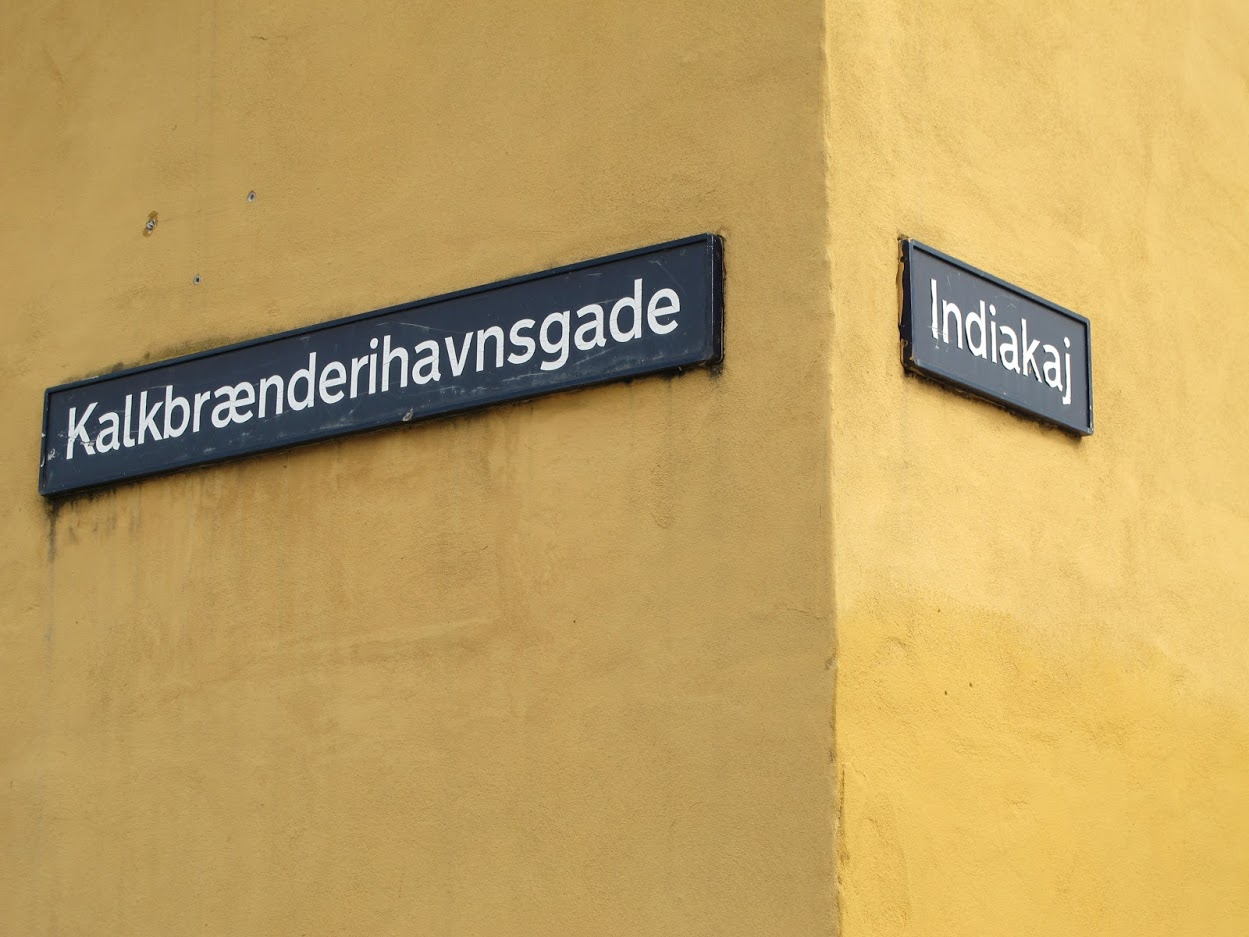
Indiakaj-Kalkbraenderihavnsgade Street signs - August 2012

== See also ==
- Final Cut for Real
