= Midtermolen =

Coordinates: 55.6970°N 12.5974°E

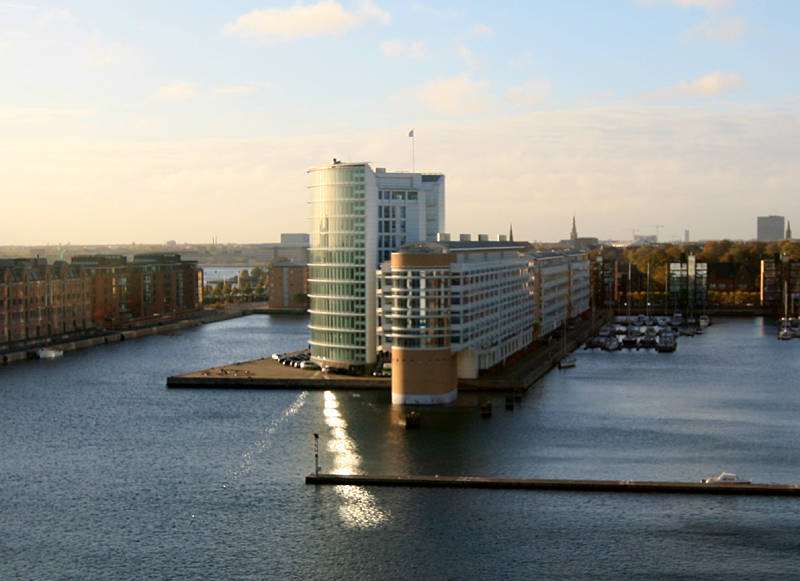
Photograph of the wharf from the north, 2007.

Midtermolen is a pier which extends north from India Quay in the Southern Free Port of Copenhagen, Denmark, dividing the dock into an east and west basin.

== History ==
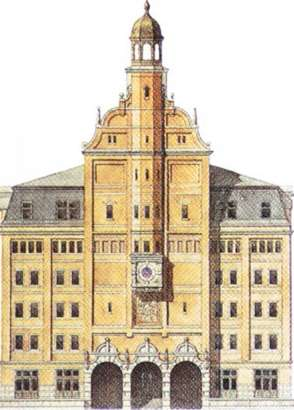
One of Dahlerup's renderings of the Silo Warehouse

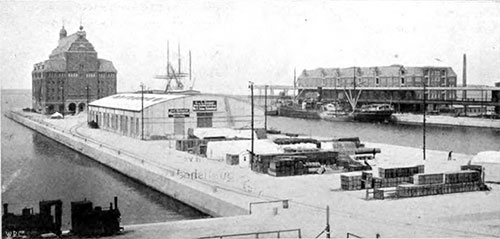
Midtermolen in 1907

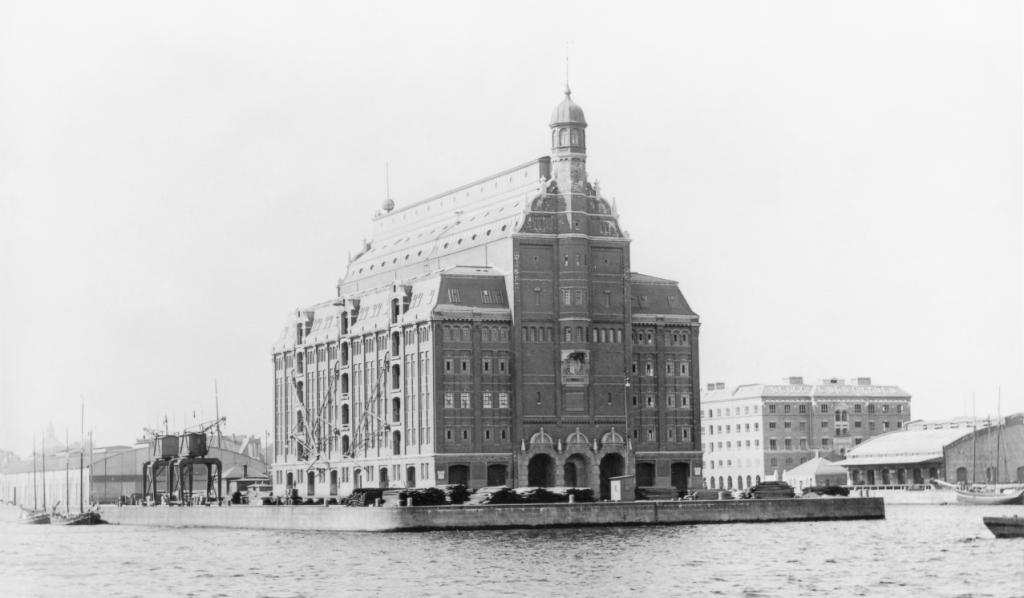
A photograph of the pier from the north, c. 1930

The wharf was constructed as part of the original free port which was constructed in 1894. The Silo Warehouse which was completed at its tip that same year was the new port area's most imposing building until it was demolished after a fire in 1969. The building was designed by Vilhelm Dahlerup with inspiration from Christian IV's Renaissance buildings. Its core was an 11 storeys high grain silo while the sides served as regular warehouses. The official time signal was from 1909 until World War II located on the roof of the building. It consisted of a ball which was raised every morning and dropped at 13:00 (12:00 UTC).

In 1994, a new headquarters for East Asiatic Company was inaugurated at the tip of the pier. The company had originally been based in Asia House at present day Indiakaj but in 1908 left the free port in favour of a new headquarters in Holbergsgade at Gammelholm. The new 19,000 square metre headquarters at Midtermolen, known as Company House, was designed by PLH Arkitekter.

== Today ==
Company House now serve as headquarters for the insurance company Alm. Brand.

== See also ==
- Marmormolen
