= UN City =

- FN Byen
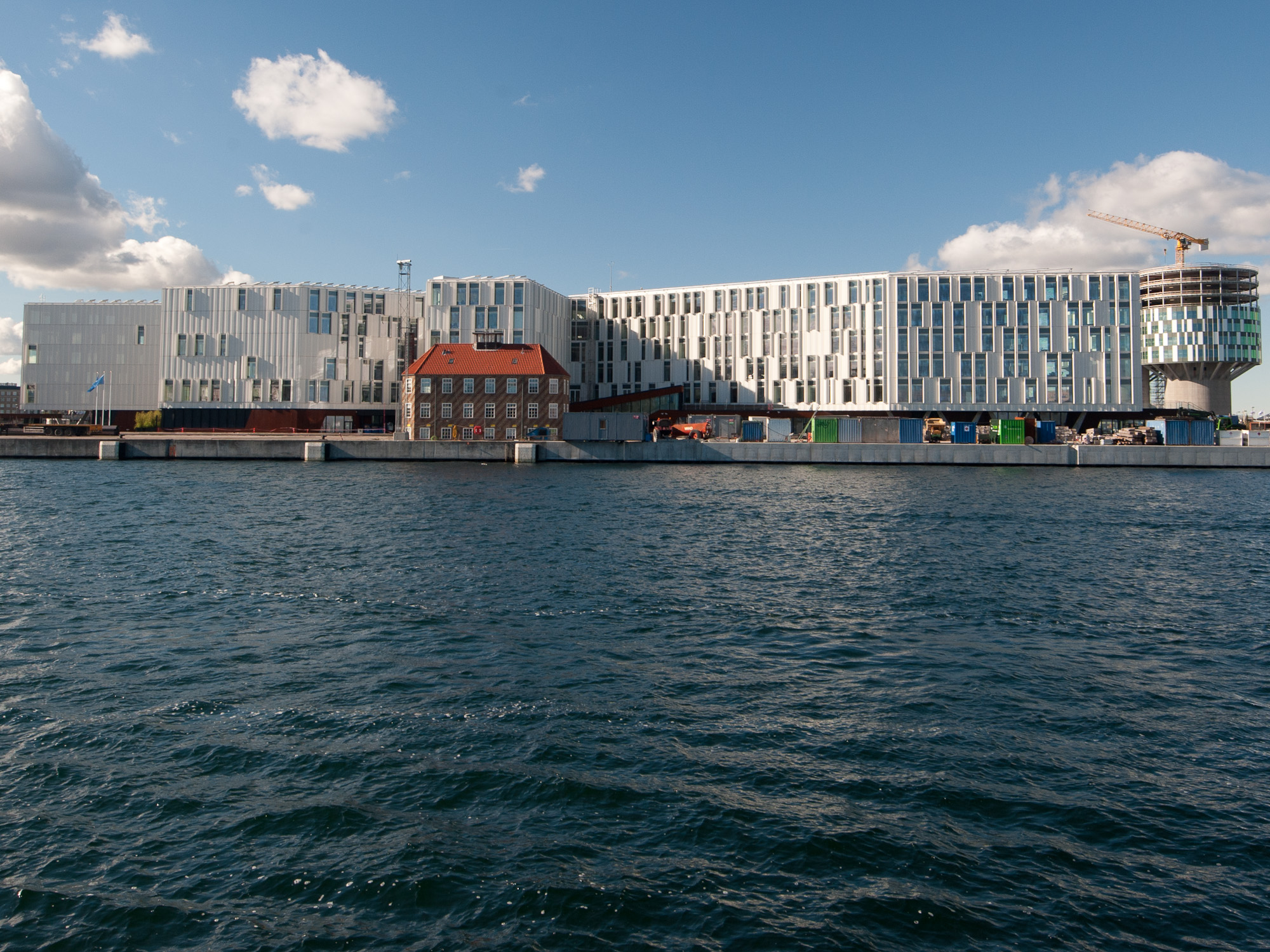
- UN City, seen from south

- Location within Denmark

General information
- Type: Office
- Location: Marmormolen 51, 2100, Copenhagen, Denmark
- Coordinates: 55.704730°N 012.597564°E
- Elevation: 3 m (10 ft) a.s.l.
- Current tenants: United Nations
- Groundbreaking: 2008
- Opened: 2013-02
- Inaugurated: 2013-07-04
- Cost: DKK 1,811,570,795.00 (May 2013)
- Owner: HARBOUR P/S (ATP Ejendomme)

Technical details
- Floor count: 6

Design and construction
- Architecture firm: 3xn

Website
- UN City in Copenhagen

The UN City (Danish: FN Byen) is located in Copenhagen, and consists of two campuses that combined house 11 United Nations agencies. The plans for a UN City in Copenhagen were born in 2002, and the location at Marmormolen was selected in 2005. Campus 1 on Marmormolen currently accommodates staff members from all 11 agencies. Campus 2, located by the container port, constitutes UNICEF's new state of the art high bay warehouse and is currently considered to be the world's largest non-food humanitarian warehouse. UN City currently accommodates 2000 employees from 104 different countries, of which 1,700 employees are located in campus 1, making it the sixth largest UN campus measured by the number of staff. The building was designed by Danish architecture firm 3XN, totals 45,000 m^{2} office space and 7,000 m^{2} basement and was inaugurated on the 4th of July 2013 by Secretary-General Ban Ki-moon and Her Majesty Queen Margrethe II of Denmark. The building is built with a large focus on sustainability and environmental friendliness, and the calculated energy consumption for the building is less than 50 kWh/m^{2}/year. The building has been awarded with the European Commission's Green Building Award for New Buildings and LEED's Platinum-certificate. The Danish Ministry of Foreign Affairs rents UN City to the UN through official development assistance funds.

== Agencies represented ==
The following UN agencies are represented in UN City:

- United Nations Development Programme (UNDP)
- United Nations Environment Programme (UNEP)
- United Nations Population Fund (UNFPA)
- United Nations Children's Fund (UNICEF)
- United Nations Office for Project Services (UNOPS)
- United Nations Entity for Gender Equality and the Empowerment of Women (UN WOMEN)
- World Food Programme (WFP)
- World Health Organization (WHO)
- United Nations High Commissioner for Refugees (UNHCR)

The UN Live museum is also proposed to be headquartered on the site.

== See also ==
- Headquarters of the United Nations
- International Court of Justice, The Hague
- Palace of Nations
- U Thant Island
- United Nations Office at Geneva
- United Nations Office at Nairobi
- United Nations Office at Vienna
