= Marmormolen =

Coordinates: 55.704°N 12.595°E

Marmormolen (lit. "Marble Pier") is a wharf in the Søndre Frihavn (English: South Free Port) area of Copenhagen, Denmark. Currently under redevelopment, a new office building for the United Nations activities in Copenhagen is being built at its tip. The plans also include a highrise which will be connected to another highrise at the tip of Langelinie Pier across the entrance to the Søndre Frihavn dock by a pedestrian and cycling bridge 65 meters above the harbor.

== History ==
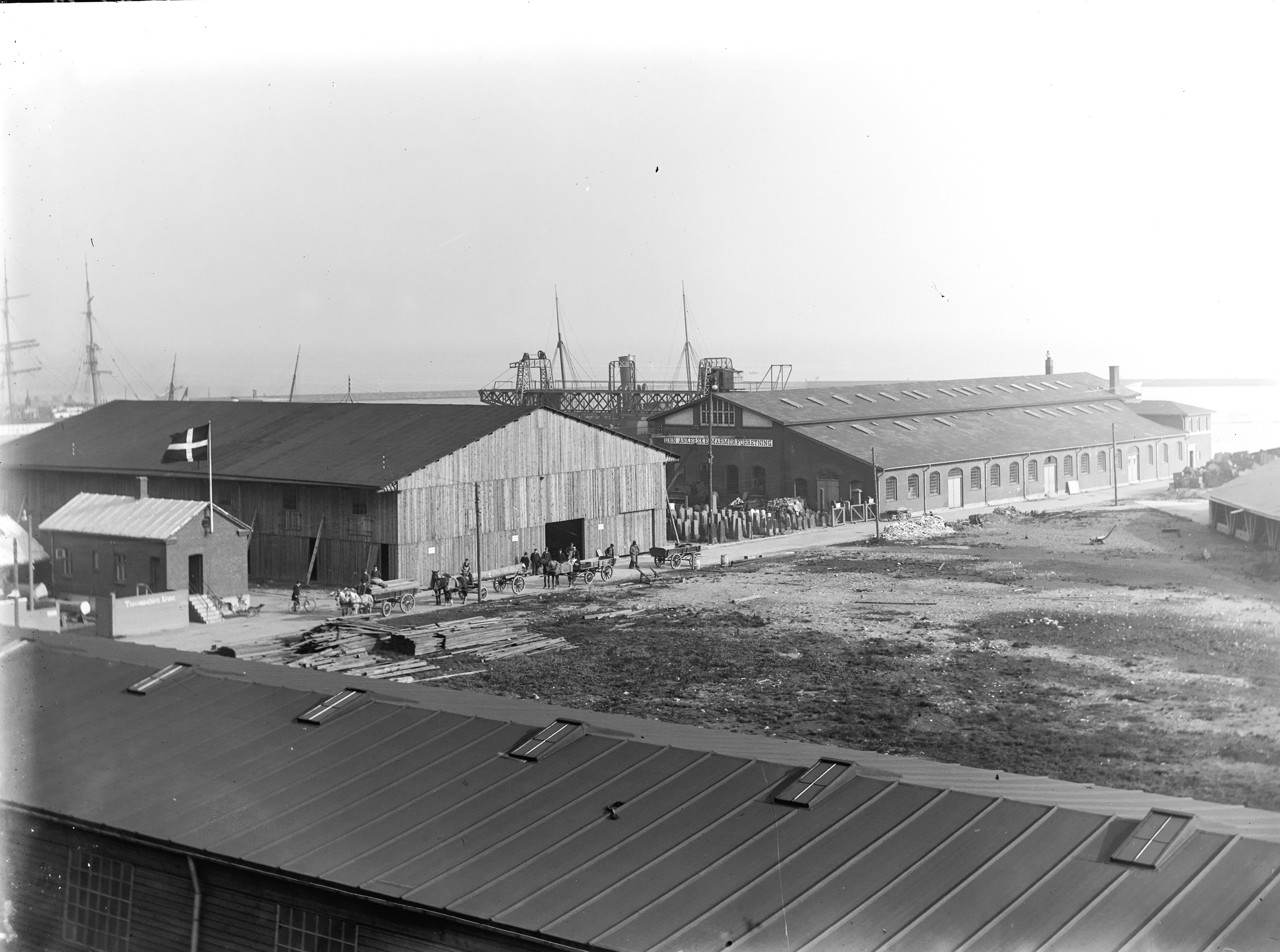
Anker's Marble Company on Marmormolen photographed by Frederik Riise, c. 1900

Marble Pier was constructed from 1893 to 1896 as part of the original Freeport of Copenhagen and remained in use until the late 1980s. It takes its name after Den Ankerske Marmorforretning (English: The Anker Marble Business), the first industrial enterprise to be established in the free port. It has since changed its name to Stenex but is still located close by, while most of its original premises were cleared in the late 1980s.

== Buildings ==
The Harbour Pilot's Building is sited on the wharf. It is a three-storey brick building from 1942.

== Redevelopment ==
The master plan for the redevelopment of the area was prepared by 3XN. CPH City & Port Development and ATP Ejendomme subsequently launched a competition by invitation for the design of the two towers which was won by Steven Holl Architects.

== See also ==
- Midtermolen
