= PLH Architects =

Danish architectural firm

PLH Architects is an architectural firm based in Copenhagen, Denmark. It was founded in 1977 by Palle Leif Hansen.

== Location ==
PLH Arkitekter is based in a former industrial complex situated in the Haraldsgade neighbourhood on the border between outer Nørrebro and Østerbro in Copenhagen. The buildings are the former home of Laurids Knudsens Mekaniske Etablissement.

== Selected projects ==
=== Completed ===
- East Asiatic Company headquarters (now Alm. Brand), Midtermolen, Copenhagen (1998)
- Havnestaden masterplan, Islands Brygge, Copenhagen (1992)
- GeoCenter Møns Klint, Møn, Denmark (2007)
- Aller House, Havneholmen, Copenhagen (2009)
- Danish National Archives, Copenhagen (2009)
- K 29, Vilnius, Lithuania (2013–2015)

=== In progress ===
- Harboes Brewery Visitor Center, Skælskør, Denmark
- Mærsk Building, Amerika Plads, Copenhagen, Denmark
- Trelleborg Visitor Center, Slagelse, Denmark

== Gallery ==
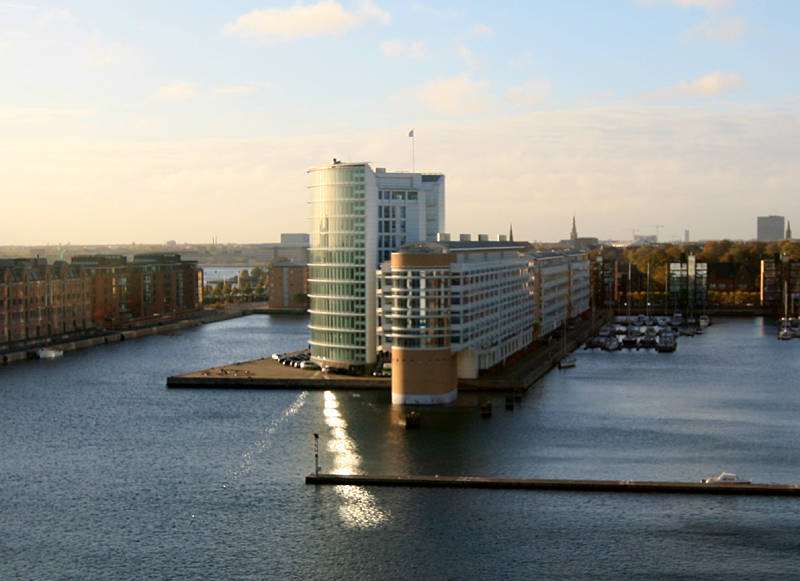
East Asiatic Company headquarters, Midtermolen, Copenhagen (1998)

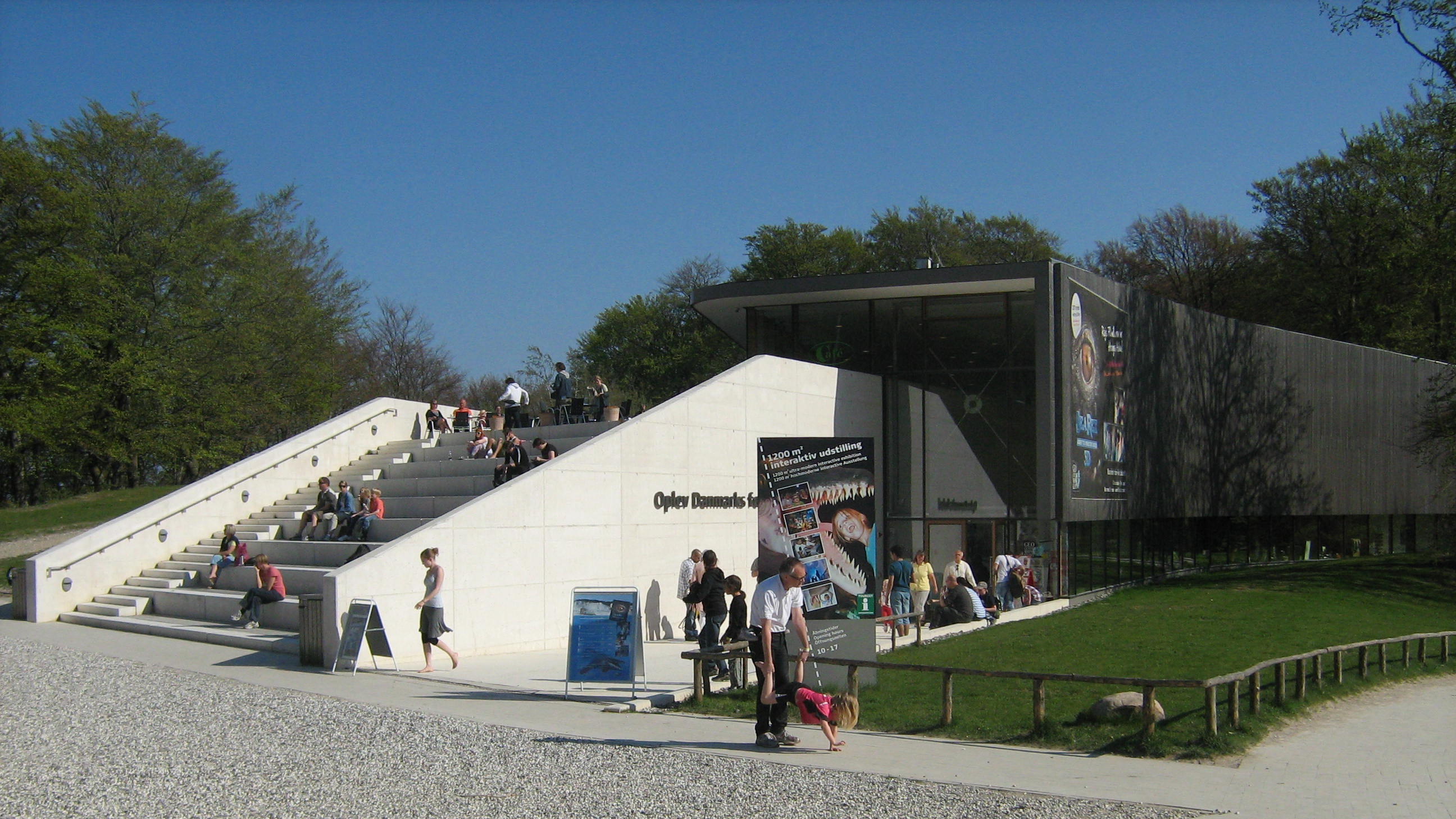
GeoCenter Møns Klint (2007)

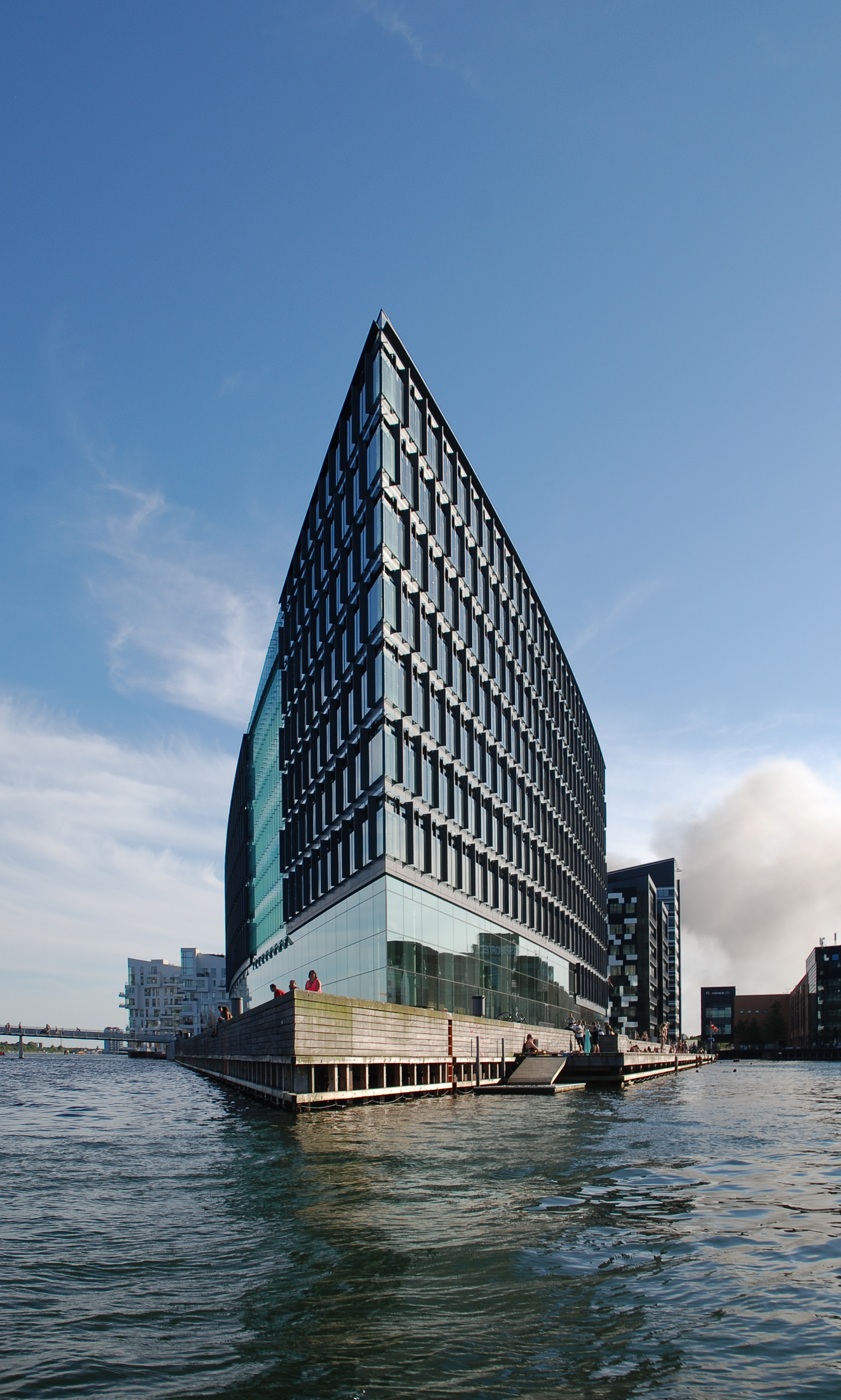
Aller House, Copenhagen (2009)
