= Amerikakaj =

Street in Copenhagen, Denmark

Coordinates: 55.6972°N 12.5954°E

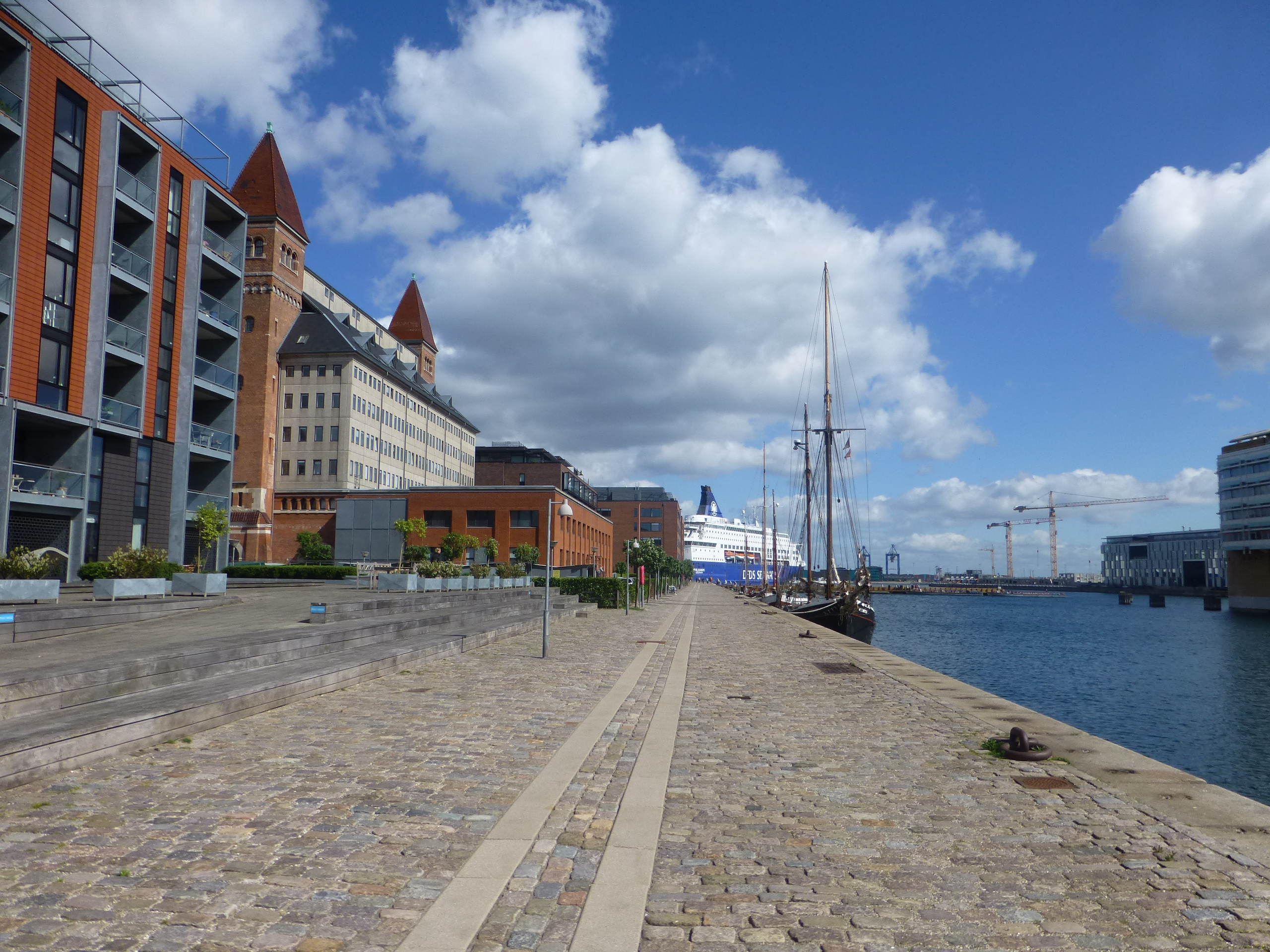
Looking north along the quay

Amerikakaj (lit. 'America Quay') is a 700 metre long quay along the west side of the Søndre Frihavn dock in Copenhagen, Denmark. The name commemorates the transatlantic passenger ships of the Scandinavian America Line which used to berth along the quay during the first half of the 20th century. Today DFDS's ferries to Oslo berth at its north end.

A number of buildings along the quay date from the Freeport of Copenhagen which originally occupied the grounds. The buildings have their address on Dampfærgevej, a parallel street which separates the quay from Amerika Plads, a mixed-use development of mainly modern buildings.

== History ==
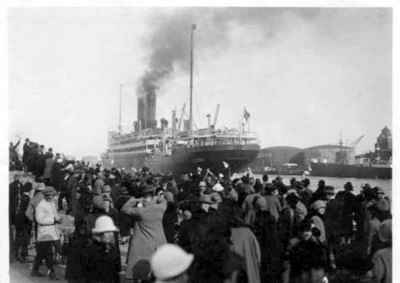
Scandinavian America Linein October 1925

The quay was built as part of the Freeport which opened to traffic in 1894. It was originally known simply as Vestkaj (English: West Quay) but received its current name in 1965 to commemorate the transatlantic passenger ships which used it as a berth.

The first direct passenger route between Scandinavia and America was operated by Thingvalla Line which was founded by Carl Frederik Tietgen in 1879. Their ships originally berthed at Larsens Plads but when the new Free Port opened, they relocated to its West Quay. The name of the company was changed to Scandinavian America Line when it was taken over by DFDS in 1898.

In 1935 the ship Fredrik VIII sailed the Scandinavian America Line's final voyage from New York to Copenhagen. The ship was scrapped in 1936. After that time, cargo and passenger service continued under the DFDS name.

== Buildings ==
The historical buildings along the quay include the free port's Central Power Station, Manufakturhuset and the Silo Warehouse. Other warehouses have been demolished to make way for modern apartment buildings.

== Danish mormon emigrant memorial ==
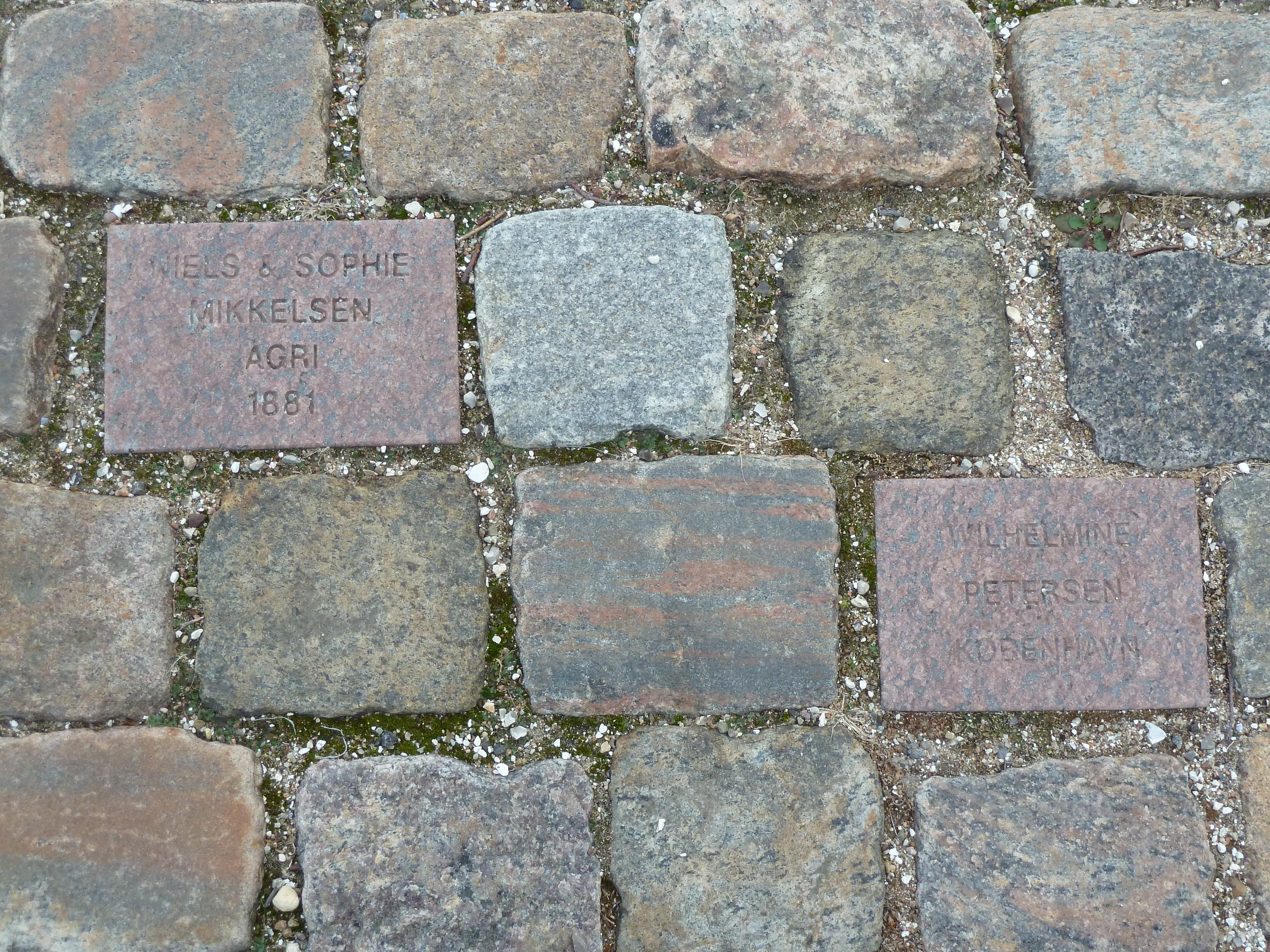
Inscribed setts at Kristina statue

Halfway along the quay, on a flight of stairs, is a statue of a young girl, commemorating the Danish mormons who were among the first Danes to emigrate to America. It is created by the American sculptor Dennis Smith and symbolically depicts his great-grandmother Kristina (Christina) Beck who in 1868 emigrated with her parents from Saltum in Vendsyssel in the far north of Jutland to Utah. Installed on 6 July 2000, the statue depicts the girl facing a strong wind as she looks out across the North Sea prior to the family's departure for America where they settled in Alpine, Utah. The setts on the promenade beneath the statue are inscribed with about 200 names and the year of their departure of Danish mormons who all emigrated to Utah in the period from 1850 until 1900.

== Gallery ==
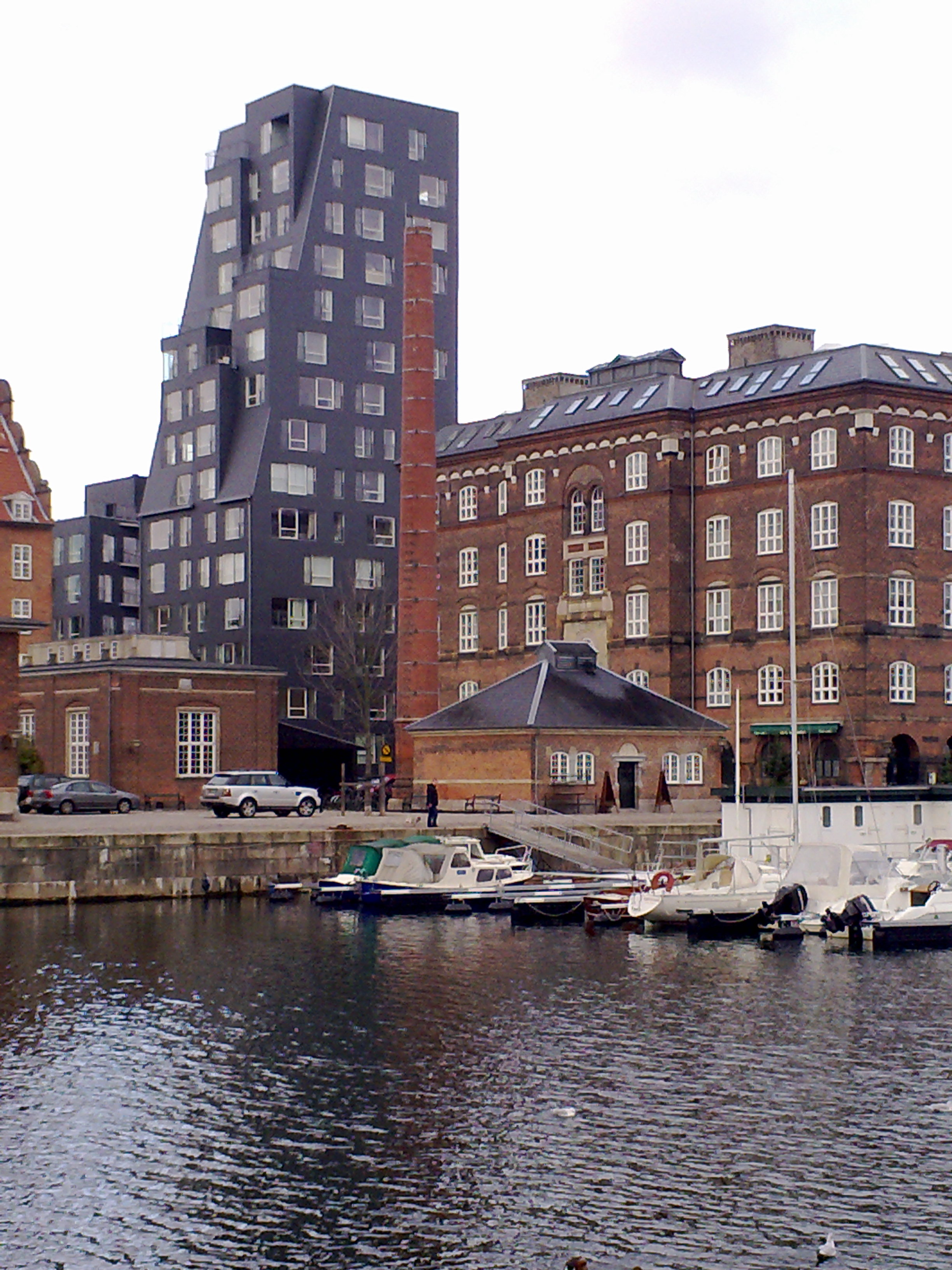
The Central Power Station at the south end of Amerikakaj

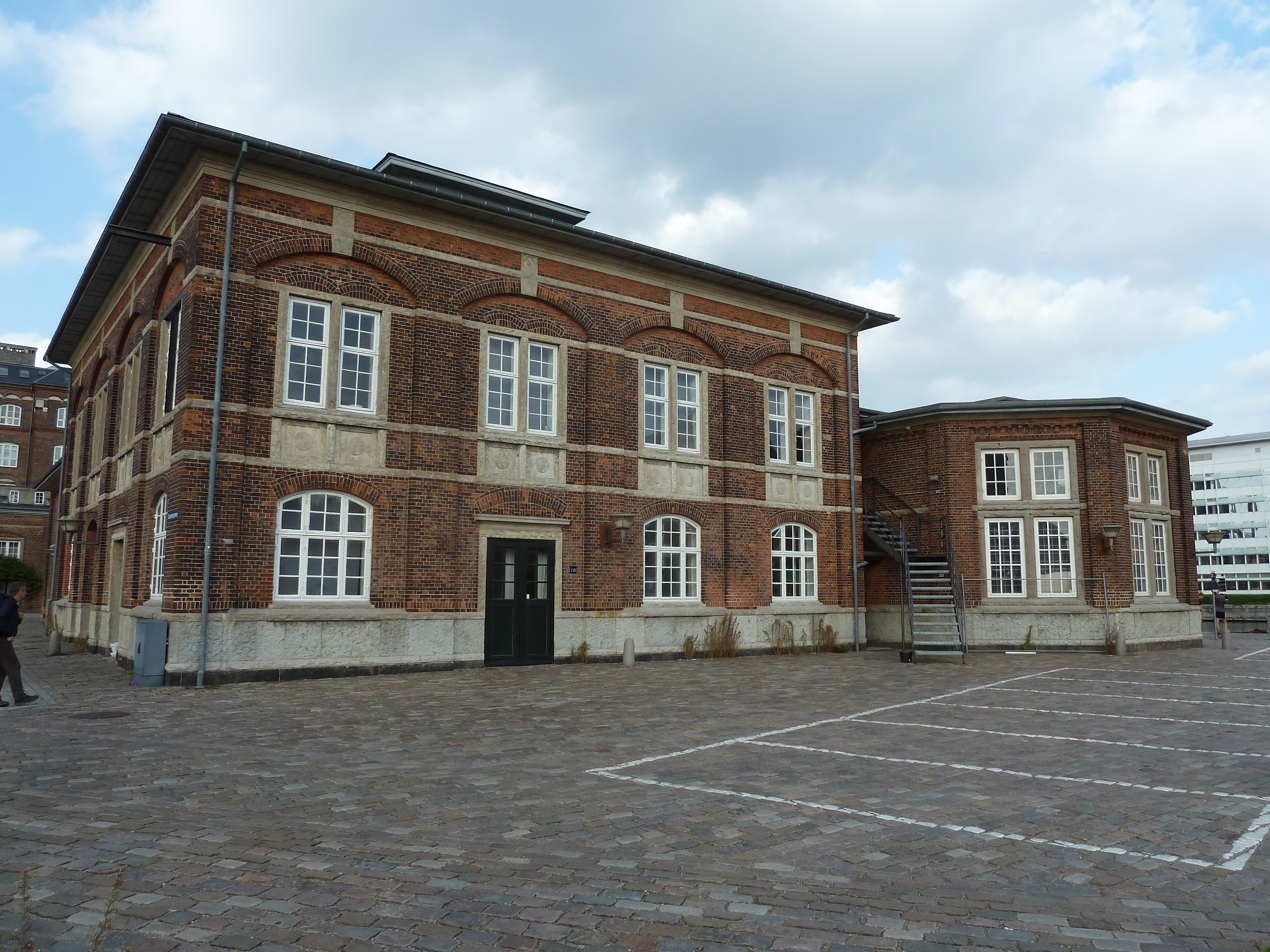
The power station and the Manufakturhuset

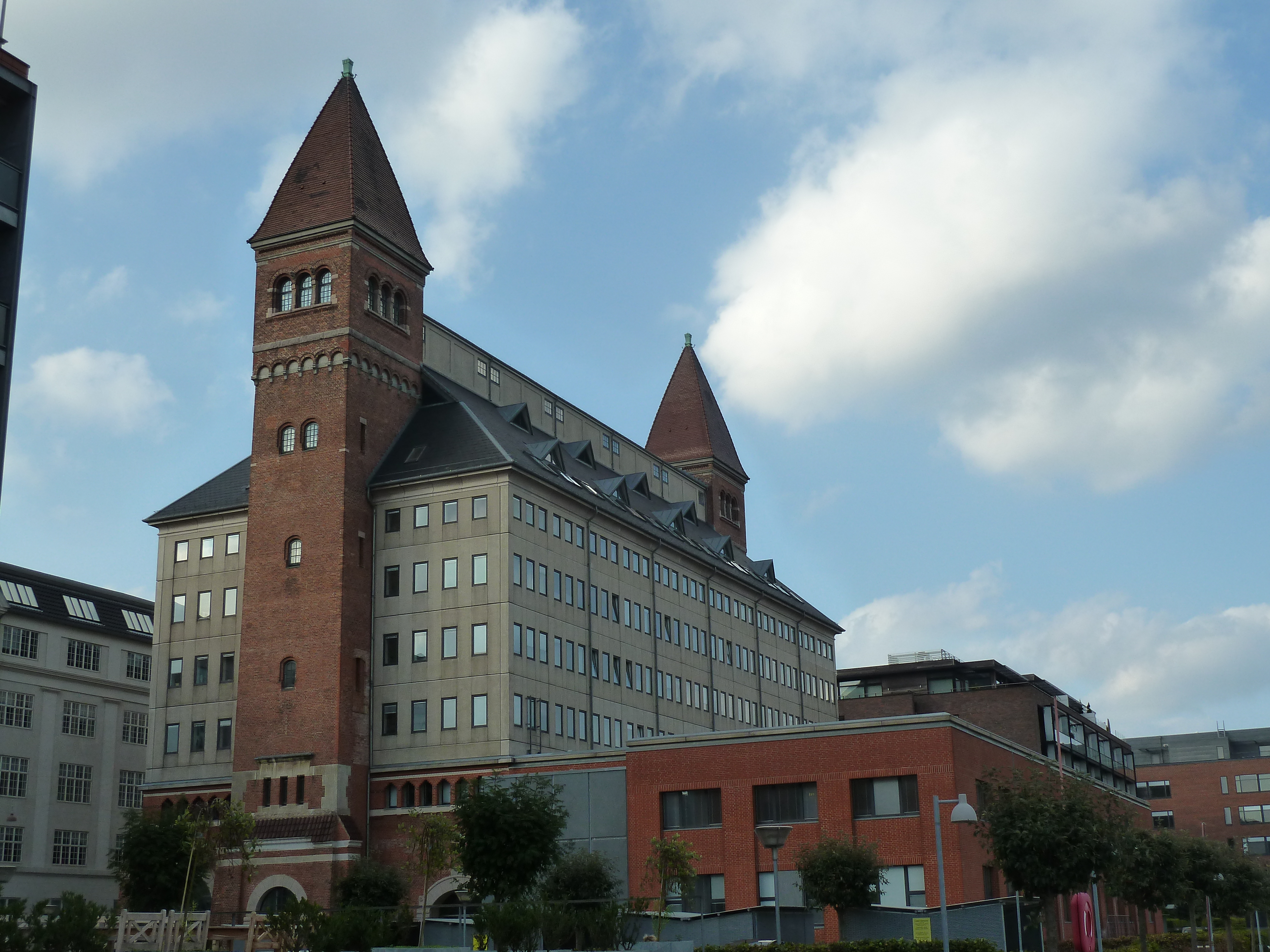
The Silo Warehouse

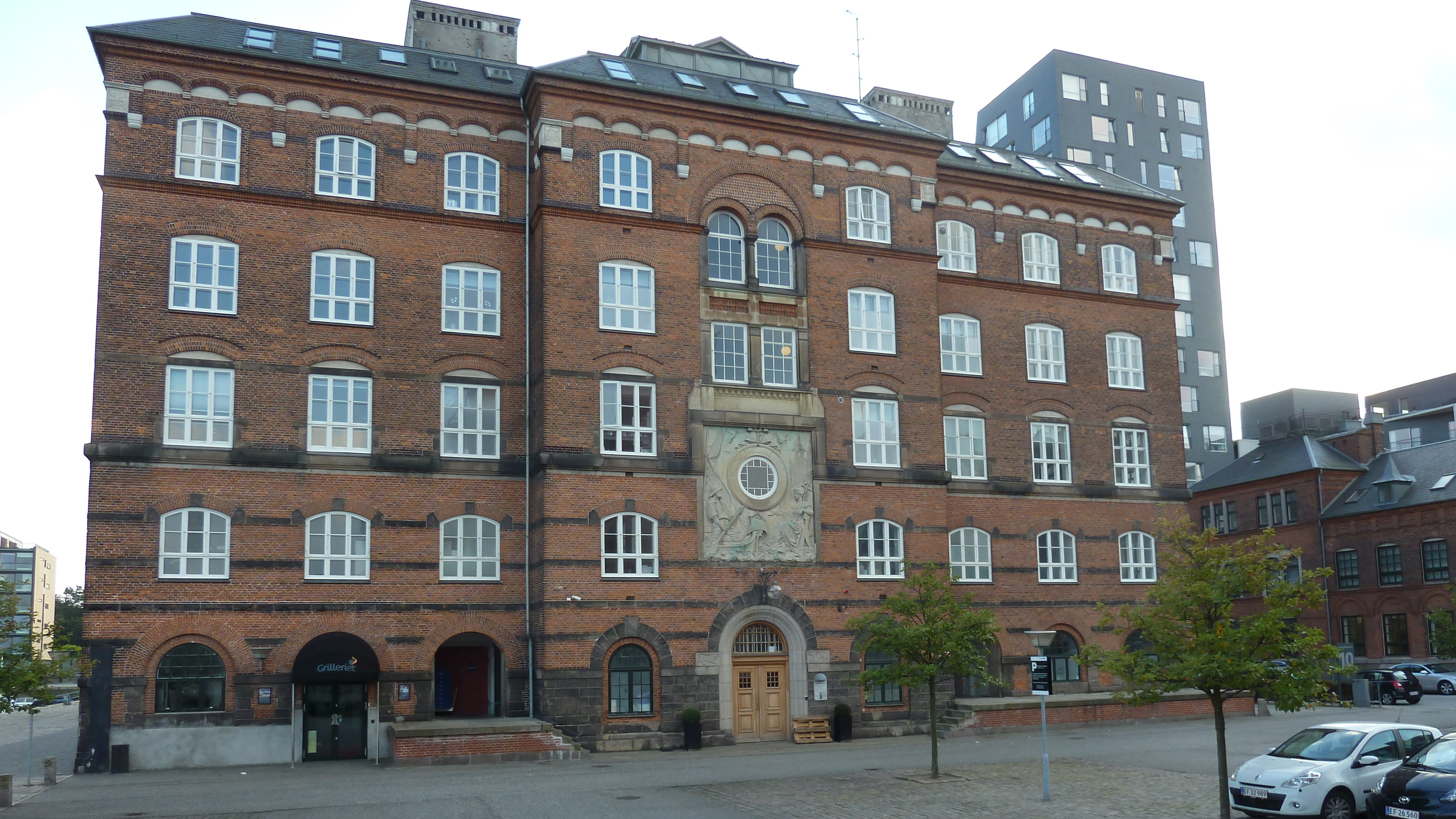
Warehouse 12 seen from the north
