= Economy of Denmark =

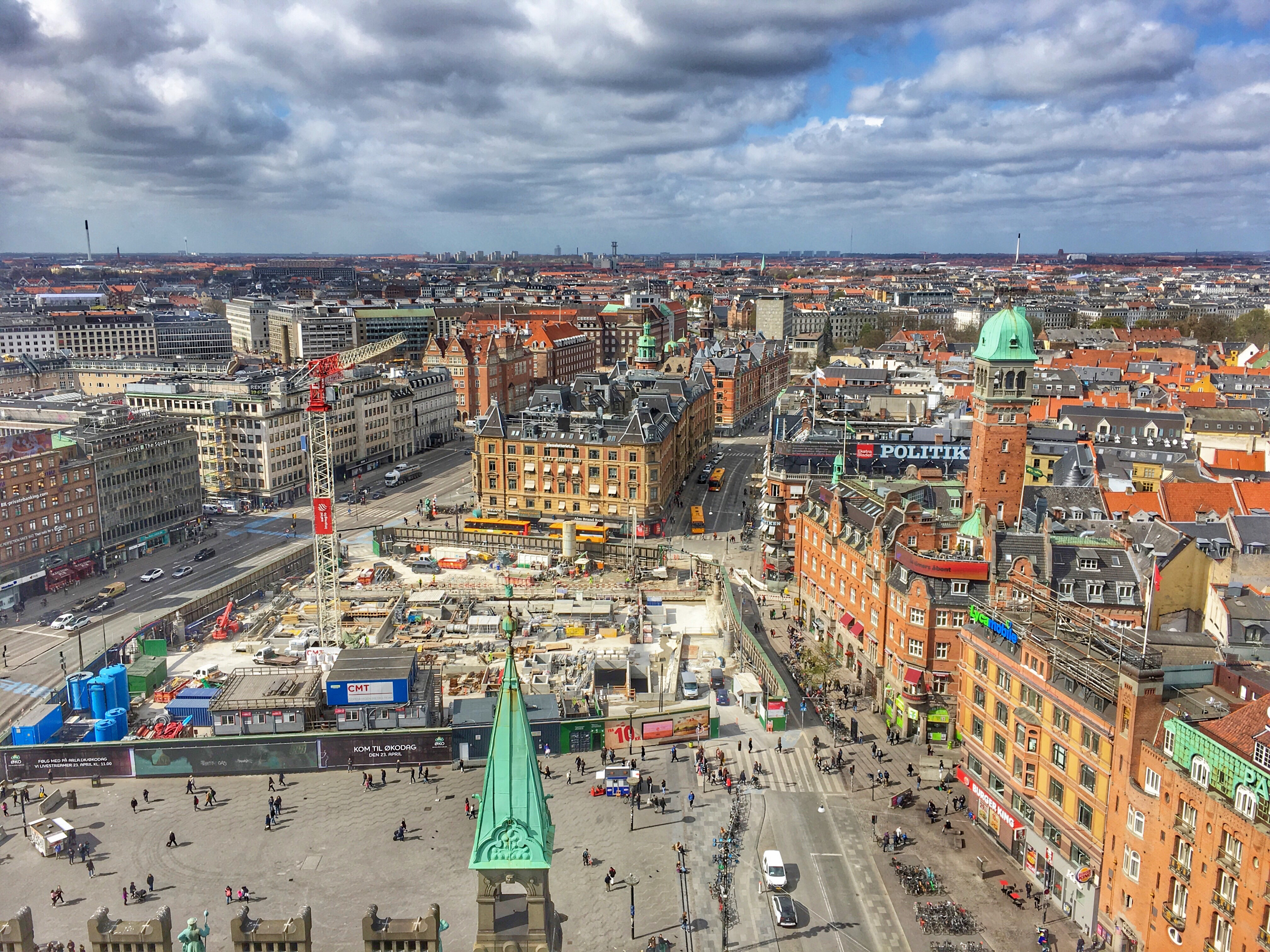
- Copenhagen is the economic centre of Denmark
- Currency: Danish krone (DKK, kr)
- Fiscal year: calendar year
- Trade organisations: EU, WTO, OECD, and others
- Country group: Advanced economy; High-income economy; Nordic model EU economy

Statistics
- Population: ▼6,031,992 (June 2026)
- GDP: ▲$503.772 billion (nominal, 2026); ▲$541.335 billion (PPP, 2026)
- GDP rank: 37th (nominal, 2026); 54th (PPP, 2026)
- GDP growth: 2.0% (2026)
- GDP per capita: ▲$83,445 (nominal, 2026); ▲$89,667 (PPP, 2026)
- GDP per capita rank: 9th (nominal, 2026); 11th (PPP, 2026)
- GDP per capita growth: 2.4% (2025)
- GDP by sector: Agriculture: 1.6%; Mining and quarrying: 1.2%; Industry: 14.4%; Utilities and construction: 7.7%; Services: 75.2%; (2017)
- Inflation (CPI): 2.0% (2026)
- Population below national poverty line: 4% in poverty (2021); 18.0% at risk of poverty or social exclusion (AROPE 2024)
- Gini coefficient: 28.6 low (2024)
- Human Development Index: 0.952 very high (2022) (5th); 0.898 very high IHDI (2022) (3rd)
- Corruption Perceptions Index: 89 out of 100 points (2025) (1st)
- Labour force: 3,132,170 (2022); 79.8% employment rate (2023)
- Labour force by occupation: Agriculture: 2.4%; Mining and quarrying: 0.1%; Industry: 10.7%; Utilities and construction: 6.7%; Services: 79.9%; (2017)
- Unemployment: ▲6.4% (2025); ▼13.8% youth unemployment rate (15 to 24 year-olds; 2025)
- Average gross salary: DKK 51,675 / €6,919 monthly (2024)
- Average net salary: DKK 34,849 / €4,666 monthly (2024)
- Main industries: Wind turbines, pharmaceuticals, medical equipment, shipbuilding and refurbishment, iron, steel, nonferrous metals, chemicals, food processing, machinery and transportation equipment, textiles and clothing, electronics, construction, furniture and other wood products

External
- Exports: $234.2 billion (2021)
- Export goods: Wind turbines, pharmaceuticals, machinery and instruments, meat and meat products, dairy products, fish, furniture and design
- Main export partners: Germany 14.0%; Sweden 10.0%; United States 10.0%; China 6.0%; Norway 5.0%; (2021)
- Imports: $208.1 billion (2021 est.)
- Import goods: Machinery and equipment, raw materials and semimanufactures for industry, chemicals, grain and foodstuffs, consumer goods
- Main import partners: Germany 21%; Sweden 12%; China 9%; Netherlands 8%; Poland 4.0%; (2021)
- FDI stock: $188.7 billion (2017); Abroad: $287.9 billion (2017)
- Current account: $32.4 billion (2021 est.)
- Gross external debt: $484.8 billion (2016)
- Net international investment position: 64.6% of GDP (1 July 2018)

Public finance
- Government debt: 33.2% of GDP (2019); DKK 770.832 billion (2019)
- Foreign reserves: $75.25 billion (2017)
- Budget balance: DKK 84.9 billion surplus (2019); +3.7% of GDP (2019)
- Revenue: 53.3% of GDP (2019)
- Spending: 49.6% of GDP (2019)
- Economic aid: €613 million from European Structural and Investment Funds (2007–2013)
- Credit rating: Standard & Poor's: AAA (Domestic); AAA (Foreign); AAA (T&C Assessment); Scope: AAA; Outlook: Stable
- All values, unless otherwise stated, are in US dollars.

Denmark has a modern high-income and highly developed social democratic economy, dominated by the service sector with 80% of all jobs; about 11% of employees work in manufacturing and 2% in agriculture. The nominal gross national income per capita was the ninth-highest in the world at $68,827 in 2023. Denmark follows the Nordic model, characterized by an internationally high tax level, and a correspondingly high level of government-provided services (e.g. health care, child care and education services). There are also income transfers to various groups, such as retirees, disabled people, the unemployed, and students.

Correcting for purchasing power, per capita income was Int$57,781 or 10th-highest globally. The income distribution is relatively equal but inequality has somewhat increased during the last decades. In 2017, Denmark had the seventh-lowest Gini coefficient (a measure of economic inequality) of the then 28 European Union countries. With 5,932,654 inhabitants as of 1 January 2023, Denmark has the 38th largest national economy in the world measured by nominal gross domestic product (GDP), and the 52nd largest in the world measured by purchasing power parity (PPP). Among OECD nations, Denmark has a highly efficient and strong social security system; social expenditure stood at roughly 26.2% of GDP.

Denmark has a very long tradition of adhering to a fixed exchange-rate system and still does so today. It is unique among OECD countries to do so while maintaining an independent currency: the Danish Krone, which is pegged to the euro. Though eligible to join the EU's Economic and Monetary Union (EMU), Danish voters in a referendum in 2000 rejected exchanging the krone for the euro. Whereas Denmark's neighbours like Norway, Sweden, Poland and the United Kingdom generally follow inflation targeting in their monetary policy, the priority of Denmark's central bank is to maintain exchange rate stability. Consequently, the central bank has no role in a domestic stabilization policy.

In an international context, a relatively large proportion of the population is part of the labour force, in particular because the female participation rate is very high. 78.8% of all 15-to-64-year-olds were active in the labour market in 2017, the sixth-highest number among all OECD countries. With a 4.8% unemployment rate, unemployment is relatively low in comparison to other European countries, where the average unemployment rate is 6.7%. The labour market is traditionally characterized by a high degree of union membership rates and collective agreement coverage. Denmark invests heavily in active labor market policies and the concept of flexicurity has been important historically.

Denmark was ranked 9th in the Global Innovation Index in 2025, and remained in the same position in the index of 2026.

== History ==
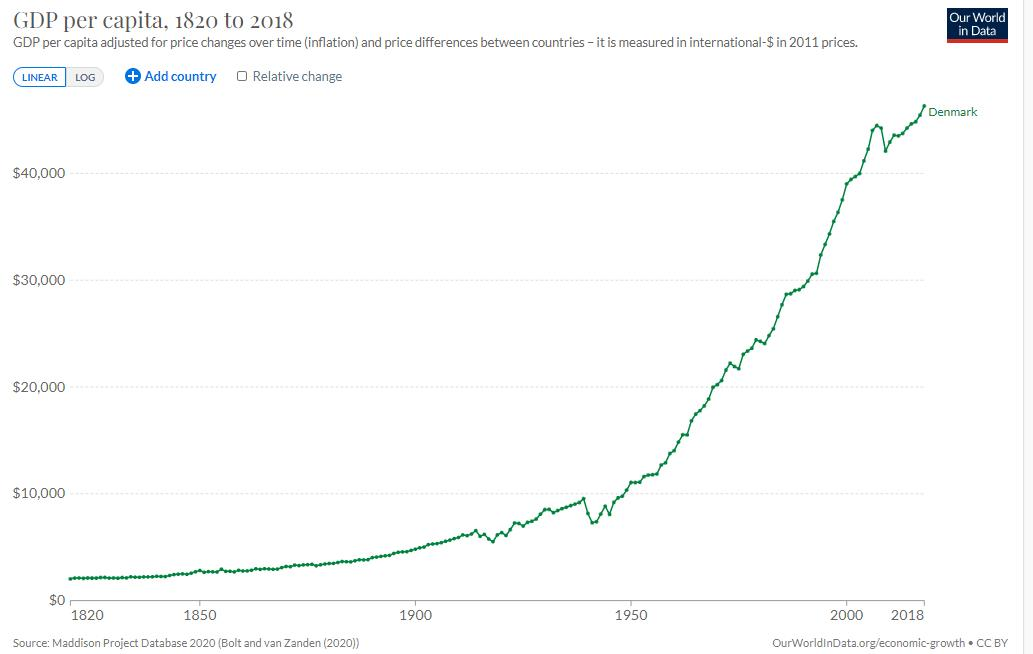
Development of real GDP per capita, 1820 to 2018

Denmark's long-term economic development has largely followed the same pattern as other Northwestern European countries. In most of recorded history Denmark has been an agricultural country with most of the population living on a subsistence level. Since the 19th century, Denmark has gone through an intense technological and institutional development. The material standard of living has experienced formerly unknown rates of growth, and the country has been industrialized and later turned into a modern market-economy society.

Almost all of the land area of Denmark is arable. Unlike most of its neighbours, Denmark has not had extractable deposits of minerals or fossil fuels, except for the deposits of oil and natural gas in the North Sea, which started playing an economic role only during the 1980s. On the other hand, Denmark has had a logistic advantage through its long coastal line and the fact that no point on Danish land is more than 50 kilometers from the sea – an important fact for the whole period before the industrial revolution when sea transport was cheaper than land transport. Consequently, foreign trade has always been very important for the economic development of Denmark.

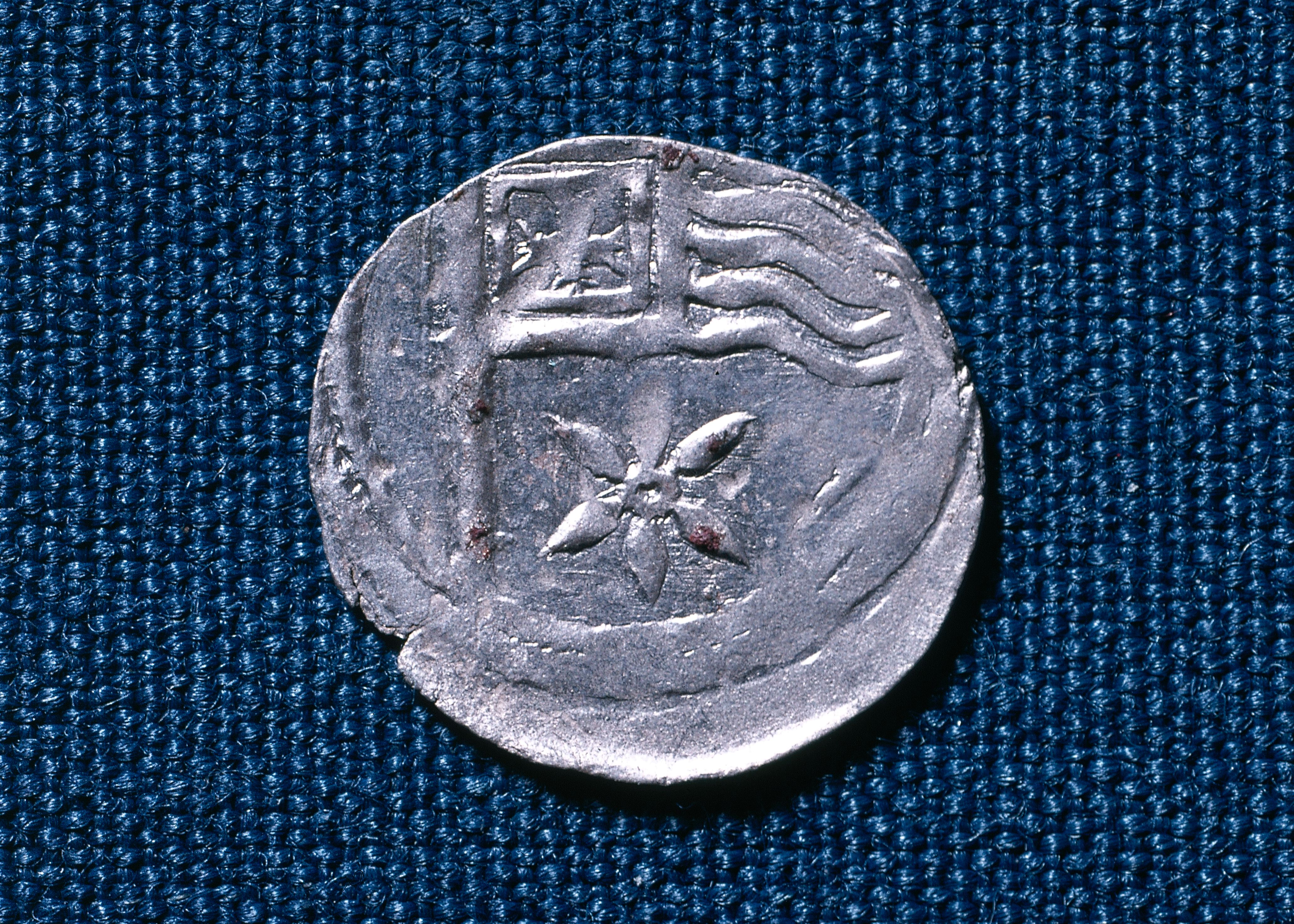
Danish silver penning from the time of Valdemar I of Denmark

Already during the Stone Age there was some foreign trade, and even though trade has made up only a very modest share of total Danish value added until the 19th century, it has been decisive for economic development, both in terms of procuring vital import goods (like metals) and because new knowledge and technological skills have often come to Denmark as a byproduct of goods exchange with other countries. The emerging trade implied specialization which created demand for means of payments, and the earliest known Danish coins date from the time of Svend Tveskæg around 995.

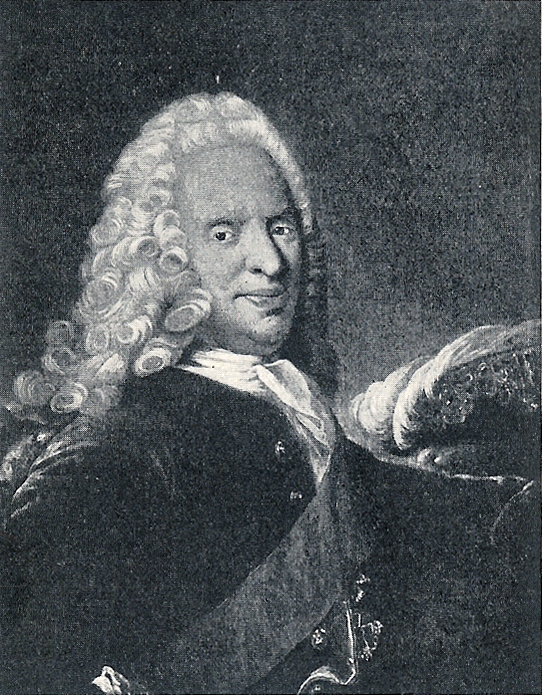
Count Otto Thott was the foremost representative of mercantilist thought in Denmark.

Improvements in shipping technology allowed traders to sail around Jutland and into the Baltic Sea directly, and Danish warships collected the Sound Toll from these mainly Dutch merchants, in exchange for protection. Nordic rulers before the mid-seventeenth century welcomed the Dutch merchants for their efficient shipping services and inflow of investments which boosted industrial development. According to economic historian Angus Maddison, Denmark was the sixth-most prosperous country in the world around 1600. The population size relative to arable agricultural land was small so that the farmers were relatively affluent, and Denmark was geographically close to the most dynamic and economically leading European areas since the 16th century: the Netherlands, the northern parts of Germany, and Britain. Still, 80 to 85% of the population lived in small villages on a subsistence level.

Mercantilism was the leading economic doctrine during the 17th and 18th century in Denmark, leading to the establishment of monopolies like Asiatisk Kompagni, development of physical and financial infrastructure like the first Danish bank Kurantbanken in 1736 and the first "kreditforening" (a kind of building society) in 1797, and the acquisition of some minor Danish colonies like Tranquebar.

At the end of the 18th century major agricultural reforms took place that entailed decisive structural changes. However, the Napoleonic Wars caused Copenhagen to lose its status as an international center of finance and trade. Politically, mercantilism was gradually replaced by liberal thoughts among the ruling elite. Following a monetary reform after the Napoleonic wars, the present Danish central bank Danmarks Nationalbank was founded in 1818.

There exists national accounting data for Denmark from 1820 onwards thanks to the pioneering work of Danish economic historian Svend Aage Hansen. They find that there has been a substantial and permanent, though fluctuating, economic growth all the time since 1820. The period 1822–94 saw on average an annual growth in factor incomes of 2% (0.9% per capita) From around 1830 the agricultural sector experienced a major boom lasting several decades, producing and exporting grains, not least to Britain after 1846 when British grain import duties were abolished. When grain production became less profitable in the second half of the century, the Danish farmers made an impressive and uniquely successful change from vegetarian to animal production leading to a new boom period. Parallelly industrialization took off in Denmark from the 1870s. At the turn of the century industry (including artisanry) fed almost 30% of the population.

During the 20th century agriculture slowly dwindled in importance relative to industry, but agricultural employment was only during the 1950s surpassed by industrial employment. The first half of the century was marked by the two world wars and the Great Depression during the 1930s. After World War II Denmark took part in the increasingly close international cooperation, joining the OECD, IMF, WTO, and from 1972 the European Economic Community, later European Union. Foreign trade increased heavily relative to GDP. The economic role of the public sector increased considerably, and the country was increasingly transformed from an industrial country to a country dominated by production of services. The years 1958–73 were an unprecedented high-growth period. The 1960s are the decade with the highest registered real per capita growth in GDP ever, i.e. 4.5% annually.

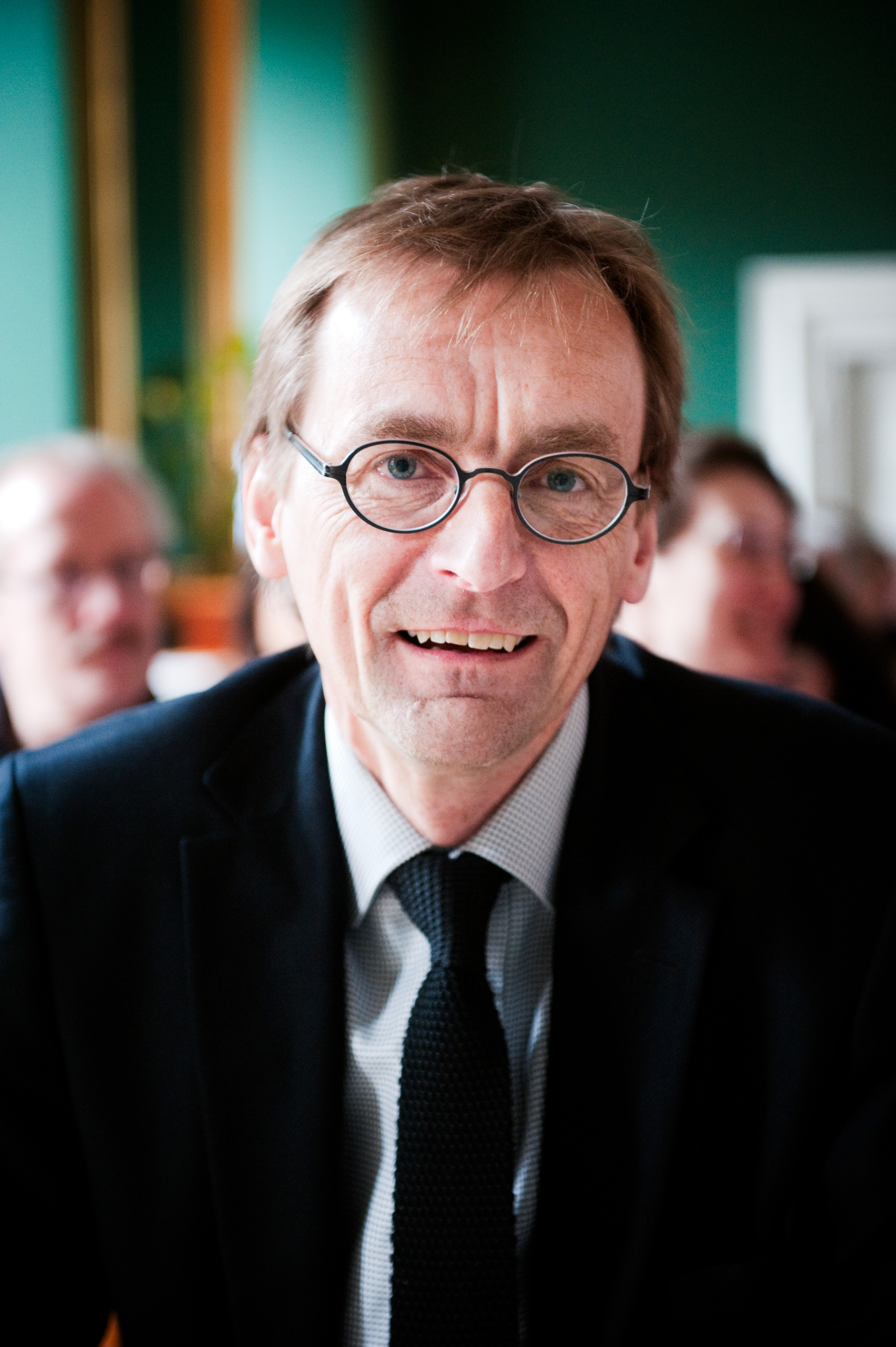
As a chairman of the Danish Economic Council and of several policy-preparing commissions, Professor Torben M. Andersen has played an important role in Danish economic policy debates for the last decades.

During the 1970s Denmark was plunged into a crisis, initiated by the 1973 oil crisis leading to the hitherto unknown phenomenon stagflation. For the next decades the Danish economy struggled with several major so-called "balance problems": High unemployment, current account deficits, inflation, and government debt. From the 1980s economic policies have increasingly been oriented towards a long-term perspective, and gradually a series of structural reforms have solved these problems. In 1994 active labour market policies were introduced that via a series of labour market reforms have helped reducing structural unemployment considerably. A series of tax reforms from 1987 onwards, reducing tax deductions on interest payments, and the increasing importance of compulsory labour market-based funded pensions from the 1990s have increased private savings rates considerably, consequently transforming secular current account deficits to secular surpluses. The announcement of a consistent and hence more credible fixed exchange rate in 1982 has helped reducing the inflation rate.

In the first decade of the 21st century new economic policy issues have emerged. A growing awareness that future demographic changes, in particular increasing longevity, could threaten fiscal sustainability, implying very large fiscal deficits in future decades, led to major political agreements in 2006 and 2011, both increasing the future eligibility age of receiving public age-related pensions. Mainly because of these changes, from 2012 onwards the Danish fiscal sustainability problem is generally considered to be solved. Instead, issues like decreasing productivity growth rates and increasing inequality in income distribution and consumption possibilities are prevalent in the public debate.

The global Great Recession during the late 2000s, the accompanying Euro area debt crisis and their repercussions marked the Danish economy for several years. Until 2017, unemployment rates have generally been considered to be above their structural level, implying a relatively stagnating economy from a business-cycle point of view. From 2017/18 this is no longer considered to be the case, and attention has been redirected to the need of avoiding a potential overheating situation.

In 2022 the popularity of Novo's Ozempic and Wegovy for weight loss began greatly affecting the Danish economy. The pharmaceutical industry contributed two thirds of growth that year, and 1.7 points of the 1.9% year-over-year growth in the first quarter of 2023. As of August 2023 Novo's market capitalization—Europe's second-largest, after LVMH—exceeded the size of the entire national economy, and it is the largest payer of corporate taxes to the Danish state. Economists discussed whether the government needed to publish data including and excluding the company; as the enormous economic growth did not similarly increase employment, data including Novo is misleading regarding the Danish business cycle. Some worried that the nation might become overdependent on the company, similar to what happened to the economy of Finland with Nokia, or that Novo's success might cause Dutch disease.

== Income, wealth and income distribution ==
Average per capita income is high in an international context. According to the World Bank, gross national income per capita was the tenth-highest in the world at $55,220 in 2017. Correcting for purchasing power, income was Int$52,390 or 16th-highest among the 187 countries.

During the last three decades household saving rates in Denmark have increased considerably. This is to a large extent caused by two major institutional changes: A series of tax reforms from 1987 to 2009 considerably reduced the effective subsidization of private debt implicit in the rules for tax deductions of household interest payments. Secondly, compulsory funded pension schemes became normal for most employees from the 1990s. Over the years, the wealth of the Danish pension funds have accumulated so that in 2016 it constituted twice the size of Denmark's GDP. The pension wealth consequently is a very important both for the life-cycle of a typical individual Danish household and for the national economy. A large part of the pension wealth is invested abroad, thus giving rise to a fair amount of foreign capital income. In 2015, average household assets were more than 600% of their disposable income, among OECD countries second only to the Netherlands. At the same time, average household gross debt was almost 300% of disposable income, which is also at the highest level in OECD. Household balance sheets are consequently very large in Denmark compared to most other countries. Danmarks Nationalbank, the Danish central bank, has attributed this to a well-developed financial system.

=== Income inequality ===
Income inequality has traditionally been low in Denmark. According to OECD figures, in 2000 Denmark had the lowest Gini coefficient of all countries. However, inequality has increased during the last decades. According to data from Statistics Denmark, the Gini coefficient for disposable income has increased from 22.1 in 1987 to 29.3 in 2017. The Danish Economic Council found in an analysis from 2016 that the increasing inequality in Denmark is due to several components: Pre-tax labour income is more unequally distributed today than before, capital income, which is generally less equally distributed than labour income, has increased as share of total income, and economic policy is less redistributive today, both because public income transfers play a smaller role today and because the tax system has become less progressive.

In international comparisons, Denmark has a relatively equal income distribution. According to the CIA World Factbook, Denmark had the twentieth-lowest Gini coefficient (29.0) of 158 countries in 2016. According to data from Eurostat, Denmark was the EU country with the seventh-lowest Gini coefficient in 2017. Slovakia, Slovenia, Czechia, Finland, Belgium and the Netherlands had a lower Gini coefficient for disposable income than Denmark.

== Labour market and employment ==
The Danish labour market is characterized by a high degree of union membership rates and collective agreement coverage dating back from Septemberforliget (The September Settlement) in 1899 when the Danish Confederation of Trade Unions and the Confederation of Danish Employers recognized each other's right to organise and negotiate. The labour market is also traditionally characterized by a high degree of flexicurity, i.e. a combination of labour market flexibility and economic security for workers. The degree of flexibility is in part maintained through active labour market policies. Denmark first introduced active labour market policies (ALMPs) in the 1990s after an economic recession that resulted in high unemployment rates. Its labour market policies are decided through tripartite cooperation between employers, employees and the government. Denmark has one of the highest expenditures on ALMPs and in 2005, spent about 1.7% of its GDP on labour market policies. This was the highest amongst the OECD countries. Similarly, in 2010 Denmark was ranked number one amongst Nordic countries for expenditure on ALMPs.

Denmark's active labour market policies particularly focus on tackling youth unemployment. They have had a "youth initiative" or the Danish Youth Unemployment Programme in place since 1996. This includes mandatory activation for those unemployed under the age of 30. While unemployment benefits are provided, the policies are designed to motivate job-seeking. For example, unemployment benefits decrease by 50% after 6 months. This is combined with education, skill development and work training programs. For instance, the Building Bridge to Education program was started in 2014 to provide mentors and skill development classes to youth that are at risk of unemployment. Such active labour market policies have been successful for Denmark in the short-term and the long-term. For example, 80% of participants in the Building Bridge for Education program felt that "the initiative has helped them to move towards completing an education". On a more macro scale, a study of the impact of ALMPs in Denmark between 1995 and 2005 showed that such policies had positive impact not just on employment but also on earnings. The effective compensation rate for unemployed workers has been declining for the last decades, however. Unlike in most Western countries there is no legal minimum wage in Denmark.

A relatively large proportion of the population is active on the labour market, not least because of a very high female participation rate. The total participation rate for people aged 15 to 64 years was 78.8% in 2017. This was the 6th-highest number among OECD countries, only surpassed by Iceland, Switzerland, Sweden, New Zealand and the Netherlands. The average for all OECD countries together was 72.1%.

According to Eurostat, the unemployment rate was 5.7% in 2017. This places unemployment in Denmark somewhat below the EU average, which was 7.6%. 10 EU member countries had a lower unemployment rate than Denmark in 2017.

Altogether, total employment in 2017 amounted to 2,919,000 people according to Statistics Denmark.

The share of employees leaving jobs every year (for a new job, retirement or unemployment) in the private sector is around 30% – a level also observed in the U.K. and U.S.- but much higher than in continental Europe, where the corresponding figure is around 10%, and in Sweden. This attrition can be very costly, with new and old employees requiring half a year to return to old productivity levels, but with attrition bringing the number of people that have to be fired down.

== Foreign trade ==
Exports of Denmark by product category (2019) Chemical products Transportation Machines Mineral products Plastics and rubbers Metals Foodstuffs Precious metals Textiles Instruments Animal products Vegetable products Paper goods Footwear and headwear Miscellaneous Stone and glass Wood products Animal and vegetable bi-products Animal hides Arts and antiques Weapons

As a small open economy, Denmark is very dependent on its foreign trade. In 2017, the value of total exports of goods and services made up 55% of GDP, whereas the value of total imports amounted to 47% of GDP. Trade in goods made up slightly more than 60% of both exports and imports, and trade in services the remaining close to 40%.

Machinery, chemicals and related products like medicine and agricultural products were the largest groups of export goods in 2017. Service exports were dominated by freight sea transport services from the Danish merchant navy. Most of Denmark's most important trading partners are neighbouring countries. The five main importers of Danish goods and services in 2017 were Germany, Sweden, United Kingdom, United States and Norway. The five countries from which Denmark imported most goods and services in 2017 were Germany, Sweden, the Netherlands, China and United Kingdom.

After having almost consistently an external balance of payments current account deficit since the beginning of the 1960s, Denmark has maintained a surplus on its BOP current account for every year since 1990, with the single exception of 1998. In 2017, the current account surplus amounted to approximately 8% of GDP. Consequently, Denmark has changed from a net debtor to a net creditor country. By 1 July 2018, the net foreign wealth or net international investment position of Denmark was equal to 64.6% of GDP, Denmark thus having the largest net foreign wealth relative to GDP of any EU country.

As the annual current account is equal to the value of domestic saving minus total domestic investment, the change from a structural deficit to a structural surplus is due to changes in these two national account components. In particular, the Danish national saving rate in financial assets increased by 11 per cent of GDP from 1980 to 2015. Two main reasons for this large change in domestic saving behaviour were the growing importance of large-scale compulsory pension schemes and several Danish fiscal policy reforms during the period which considerably decreased tax deductions of household interest expense, thus reducing the tax subsidy to private debt.

== Currency and monetary policy ==
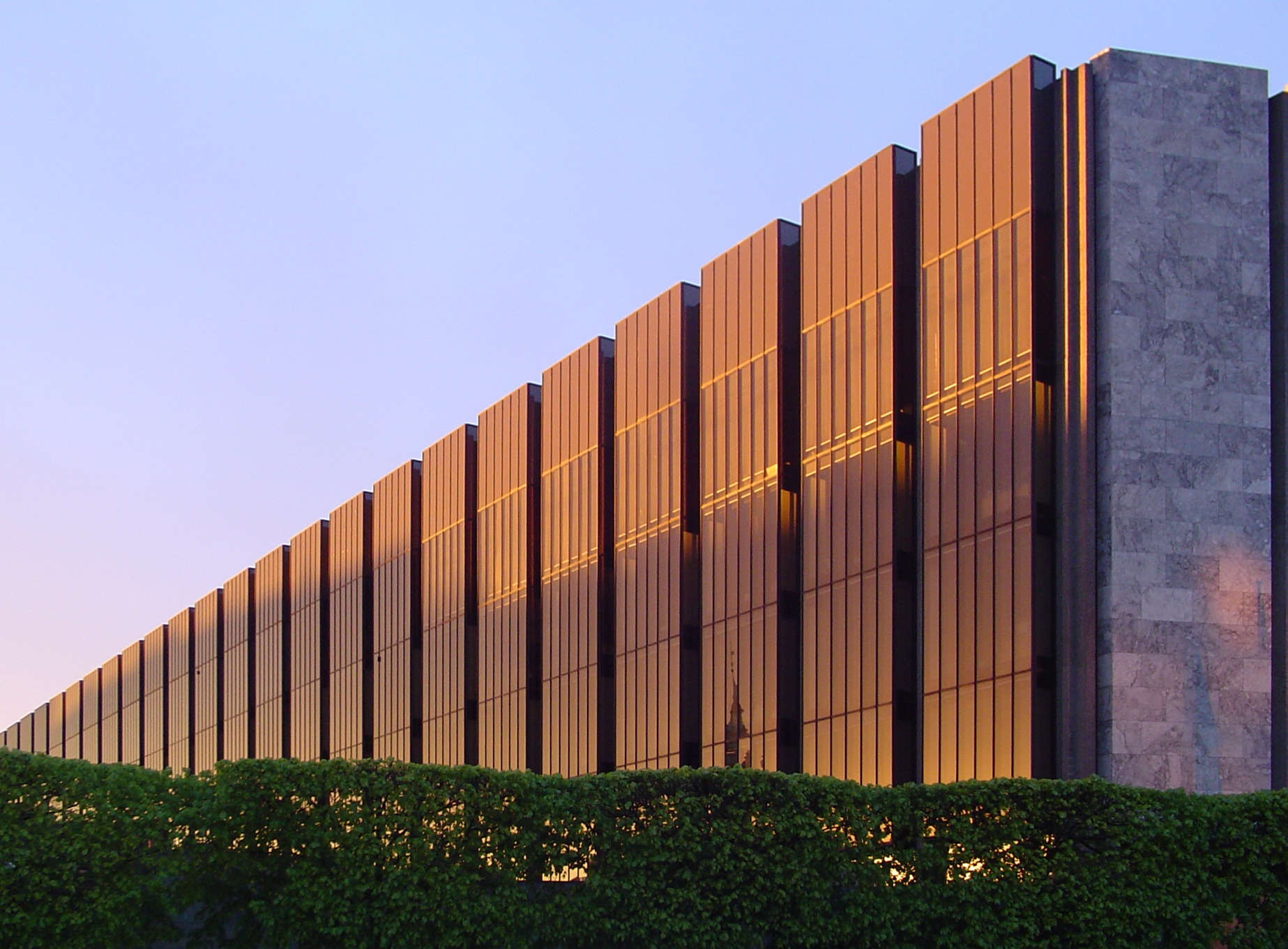
The building of Danmarks Nationalbank, the central bank of Denmark, built by the Danish architect Arne Jacobsen

The Danish currency is the Danish krone, subdivided into 100 øre. The krone and øre were introduced in 1875, replacing the former rigsdaler and skilling. Denmark has a very long tradition of maintaining a fixed exchange-rate system, dating back to the period of the gold standard during the time of the Scandinavian Monetary Union from 1873 to 1914. After the breakdown of the international Bretton Woods system in 1971, Denmark devalued the krone repeatedly during the 1970s and the start of the 1980s, effectively maintaining a policy of "fixed, but adjustable" exchange rates. Rising inflation led to Denmark declaring a more consistent fixed exchange-rate policy in 1982. At first, the krone was pegged to the European Currency Unit or ECU, from 1987 to the Deutsche Mark, and from 1999 to the euro.

Although eligible, Denmark chose not to join the European Monetary Union when it was founded. In 2000, the Danish government advocated Danish EMU membership and called a referendum to settle the issue. With a turn-out of 87.6%, 53% of the voters rejected Danish membership. Occasionally, the question of calling another referendum on the issue has been discussed, but since the 2008 financial crisis, opinion polls have shown a clear majority against Denmark joining the EMU, and the question is not high on the political agenda presently.

Maintenance of the fixed exchange rate is the responsibility of Danmarks Nationalbank, the Danish central bank. As a consequence of the exchange rate policy, the bank must always adjust its interest rates to ensure a stable exchange rate and consequently cannot at the same time conduct monetary policy to stabilize e.g. domestic inflation or unemployment rates. This makes the conduct of stabilization policy fundamentally different from the situation in Denmark's neighbouring countries like Norway, Sweden, Poland and the United Kingdom, in which the central banks have a central stabilizing role. Denmark is presently the only OECD member country maintaining an independent currency with a fixed exchange rate. Consequently, the Danish krone is the only currency in the European Exchange Rate Mechanism II (ERM II), before Bulgaria and Croatia joined in 2020 (the latter uses the euro since 2023)

In the first months of 2015, Denmark experienced the largest pressure against the fixed exchange rate for many years because of very large capital inflows, causing a tendency for the Danish krone to appreciate. Danmarks Nationalbank reacted in various ways, chiefly by lowering its interest rates to record low levels. On 6 February 2015 the certificates of deposit rate, one of the four official Danish central bank rates, was lowered to −0.75%. In January 2016 the rate was raised to −0.65%, at which level it has been maintained since then.

Inflation in Denmark as measured by the official consumer price index of Statistics Denmark was 1.1% in 2017. Inflation has generally been low and stable for the last decades. Whereas in 1980 annual inflation was more than 12%, in the period 2000–2017 the average inflation rate was 1.8%.

== Government ==
=== Overall organization ===
Since a local-government reform in 2007, the general government organization in Denmark is carried out on three administrative levels: central government, regions, and municipalities. Regions administer mainly health care services, whereas municipalities administer primary education and social services. Municipalities in principle independently levy income and property taxes, but the scope for total municipal taxation and expenditure is closely regulated by annual negotiations between the municipalities and the Finance Minister of Denmark. At the central government level, the Ministry of Finance carries out the coordinating role of conducting economic policy. In 2012, the Danish parliament passed a Budget Law (effective from January 2014) which governs the over-all fiscal framework, stating among other things that the structural deficit must never exceed 0.5% of GDP, and that Danish fiscal policy is required to be sustainable, i.e. have a non-negative fiscal sustainability indicator. The Budget Law also assigned the role of independent fiscal institution (IFI, informally known as "fiscal watchdog") to the already-existing independent advisory body of the Danish Economic Councils.

=== Budget and fiscal position ===
Danish fiscal policy is generally considered healthy. Government net debt was close to zero at the end of 2017, amounting to DKK 27.3 billion, or 1.3% of GDP. The government sector having a fair amount of financial assets as well as liabilities, government gross debt amounted to 36.1% of GDP at the same date. The gross EMU-debt as percentage of GDP was the sixth-lowest among all 28 EU member countries, only Estonia, Luxembourg, Bulgaria, the Czech Republic and Romania having a lower gross debt. Denmark had a government budget surplus of 1.1% of GDP in 2017.

Long-run annual fiscal projections from the Danish government as well as the independent Danish Economic Council, taking into account likely future fiscal developments caused by demographic developments etc. (e.g. a likely ageing of the population caused by a considerable expansion of life expectancy), consider the Danish fiscal policy to be overly sustainable in the long run. In Spring 2018, the so-called Fiscal Sustainability Indicator was calculated by the Danish government and the Danish Economic Council to be 1.2% and 0.9% of GDP, respectively. This implies that under the assumptions employed in the projections, fiscal policy could be permanently loosened (via more generous public expenditures and/or lower taxes) by c. 1% of GDP while still maintaining a stable government debt-to-GDP ratio in the long run.

=== Taxation ===
The tax level as well as the government expenditure level in Denmark ranks among the highest in the world, which is traditionally ascribed to the Nordic model of which Denmark is an example, including the welfare state principles which historically evolved during the 20th century. In 2022, the official Danish tax level amounted to 42.2% of GDP. The all-record highest Danish tax level was 49.8% of GDP, reached in 2014 because of high extraordinary one-time tax revenues caused by a reorganization of the Danish-funded pension system. The Danish tax-to-GDP-ratio of 42% was the seventh-highest among all OECD countries in 2022, after France, Norway, Austria, Finland, Italy and Belgium. The OECD average was 34%. The tax structure of Denmark (the relative weight of different taxes) also differs from the OECD average, as the Danish tax system in 2015 was characterized by substantially higher revenues from taxes on personal income, whereas on the other hand, no revenues at all derive from social security contributions. A lower proportion of revenues in Denmark derive from taxes on corporate income and gains and property taxes than in OECD generally, whereas the proportion deriving from payroll taxes, VAT, and other taxes on goods and services correspond to the OECD average.

In 2016, the average marginal tax rate on labour income for all Danish tax-payers was 38.9%. The average marginal tax on personal capital income was 30.7%.

Professor of Economics at Princeton University Henrik Kleven has suggested that three distinct policies in Denmark and its Scandinavian neighbours imply that the high tax rates cause only relatively small distortions to the economy:

- widespread use of third-party information reporting for tax collection purposes (ensuring a low level of tax evasion)
- broad tax bases (ensuring a low level of tax avoidance)
- a strong subsidization of goods that are complementary to working (ensuring a high level of labour force participation).

in 2023, Denmark considered methods to increase taxes on energy dealers.

=== Government expenditure ===
Parallel to the high tax level, government expenditure makes up a large part of GDP, and the government sector carries out many different tasks. By September 2018, 831,000 people worked in the general government sector, corresponding to 29.9% of all employees. In 2017, total government expenditure amounted to 50.9% of GDP. Government consumption took up precisely 25% of GDP (e.g. education and health care expenditure), and government investment (infrastructure etc.) expenditure another 3.4% of GDP. Personal income transfers (for e.g. elderly or unemployed people) amounted to 16.8% of GDP.

Denmark has an unemployment insurance system called the A-kasse (arbejdsløshedskasse). This system requires a paying membership of a state-recognized unemployment fund. Most of these funds are managed by trade unions, and part of their expenses are financed through the tax system. Members of an A-kasse are not obliged to be members of a trade union. Not every Danish citizen or employee qualifies for a membership of an unemployment fund, and membership benefits will be terminated after 2 years of unemployment. A person that is not a member of an A-kasse cannot receive unemployment benefits. Unemployment funds do not pay benefits to sick members, who will be transferred to a municipal social support system instead. Denmark has a countrywide, but municipally administered social support system against poverty, securing that qualified citizens have a minimum living income. All Danish citizens above 18 years of age can apply for some financial support if they cannot support themselves or their family. Approval is not automatic, and the extent of this system has generally been diminished since the 1980s. Sick people can receive some financial support throughout the extent of their illness. Their ability to work will be re-evaluated by the municipality after 5 months of illness.

The welfare system related to the labor market has experienced several reforms and financial cuts since the late 1990s due to political agendas for increasing the labor supply. Several reforms of the rights of the unemployed have followed up, partially inspired by the Danish Economic Council. Halving the time unemployment benefits can be received from four to two years, and making it twice as hard to regain this right, was implemented in 2010 for example.

Disabled people can apply for permanent social pensions. The extent of the support depends on the ability to work, and people below 40 are not eligible unless deemed incapable of any kind of work.

== Industries ==
=== Agriculture ===
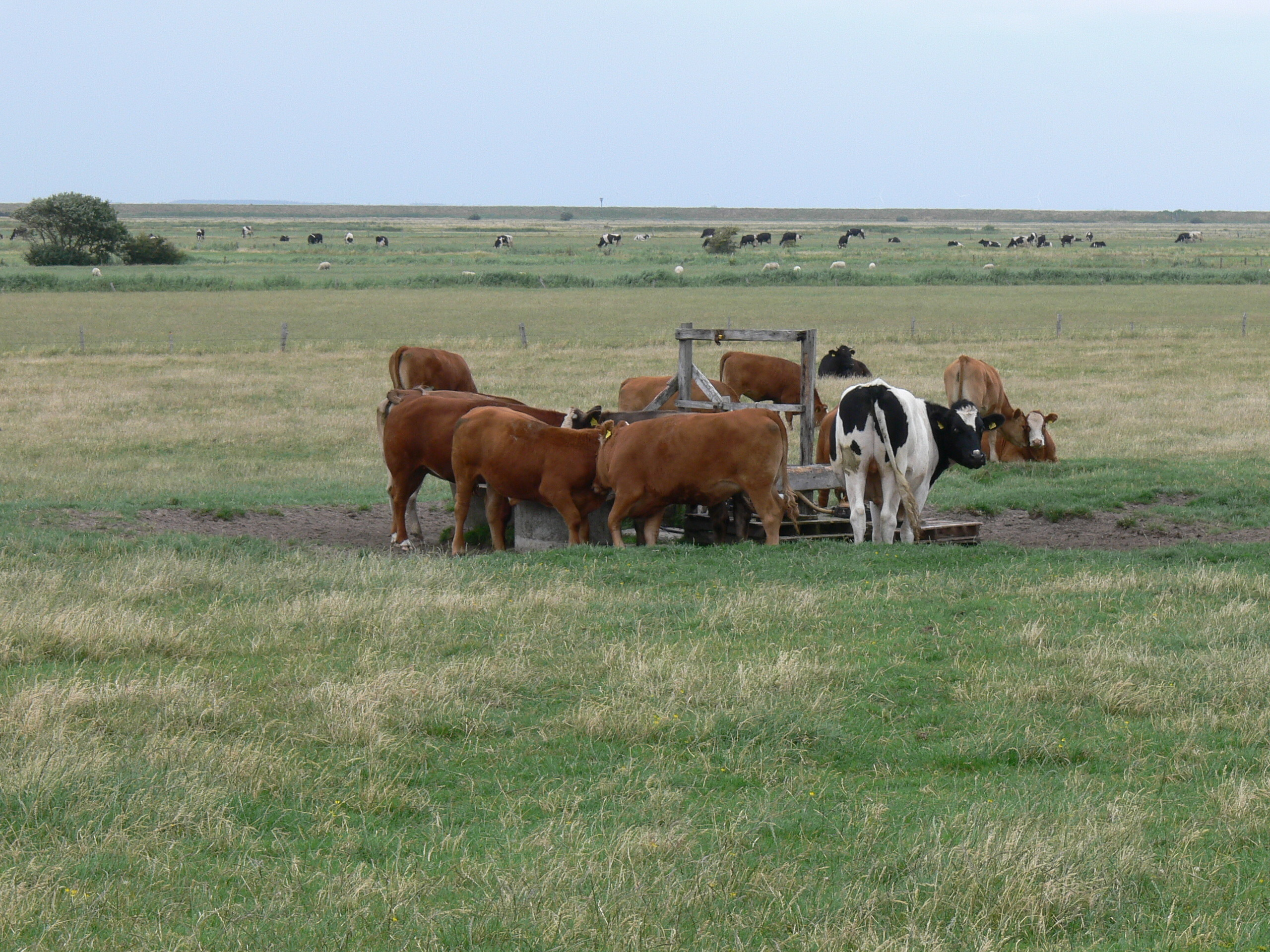
Pasture grazing cattle (Rømø)

Agriculture was once the most important industry in Denmark. Nowadays, it is of minor economic importance. In 2016, 62,000 people, or 2.5% of all employed people worked in agriculture and horticulture. Another 2,000 people worked in fishing. As value added per person is relatively low, the share of national value added is somewhat lower. Total gross value added in agriculture, forestry and fishing amounted to 1.6% of total output in Denmark (in 2017). Despite this, Denmark is still home to various types of agricultural production. Within animal husbandry, it includes dairy and beef cattle, pigs, poultry and fur animals – all sectors that produce mainly for export. Regarding vegetable production, Denmark is a leading producer of grass-, clover- and horticultural seeds. The agriculture and food sector as a whole represented 25% of total Danish commodity exports in 2015.

63% of the land area of Denmark is used for agricultural production – the highest share in the world according to a report from University of Copenhagen in 2017. The Danish agricultural industry is historically characterized by freehold and family ownership, but due to structural development farms have become fewer and larger. In 2020 the number of farms was approximately 33,000, of which approximately 10,000 were owned by full-time farmers.

==== Animal production ====
The tendency toward fewer and larger farms has been accompanied by an increase in animal production, using fewer resources per produced unit.

The number of dairy farmers has reduced to about 3,800 with an average herd size of 150 cows. The milk quota is 1,142 tonnes. More than half of the cows live in new loose-housing systems. Export of dairy products accounts for more than 20 percent of the total Danish agricultural export. The total number of cattle in 2011 was approximately 1.5 million. Of these, 565,000 were dairy cows and 99,000 were suckler cows. The yearly number of slaughtering of beef cattle is around 550,000.

For more than 100 years the production of pigs and pig meat was a major source of income in Denmark. Approximately 90 percent of the production is exported. This accounts for almost half of all agricultural exports and for around 5 percent of Denmark's total exports. About 4,200 farmers produce 28 million pigs annually. Of these, 20.9 million are slaughtered in Denmark.

Fur animal production on an industrial scale started in the 1930s in Denmark. Prior to a government-mandated culling during the COVID-19 pandemic, Denmark was the world's largest producer of mink furs, with 1,400 mink farmers fostering 17.2 million mink and producing around 14 million furs of the highest quality every year (see mink industry in Denmark). Approximately 98 percent of the skins sold at Kopenhagen Fur Auction were exported. Fur ranked as Danish agriculture's third largest export article, at more than DKK 7 billion annually. The number of farms peaked in the late 1980s at more than 5,000 farms, but the number has declined steadily since, as individual farms grew in size. Danish mink farmers claim their business to be sustainable, feeding the mink food industry waste and using all parts of the dead animal as meat, bone meal and biofuel. Special attention is given to the welfare of the mink, and regular "Open Farm" arrangements are made for the general public. Mink thrive in, but are not a native to Denmark, and it is considered an invasive species. American Mink are now widespread in Denmark and continues to cause problems for the native wildlife, in particular waterfowl. Denmark also has a small production of fox, chinchilla and rabbit furs.

Two hundred professional producers are responsible for the Danish egg production, which was 66 million kg in 2011. Chickens for slaughter are often produced in units with 40,000 broilers. In 2012, 100 million chickens were slaughtered. In the minor productions of poultry, 13 million ducks, 1.4 million geese and 5.0 million turkeys were slaughtered in 2012.

==== Organic production ====
Organic farming and production has increased considerably and continuously in Denmark since 1987 when the first official regulations of this particular agricultural method came into effect. In 2017, the export of organic products reached DK 2.95 billion, a 153% increase from 2012 five years earlier, and a 21% increase from 2016. The import of organic products has always been higher than the exports though and reached DK 3.86 billion in 2017. After some years of stagnation, close to 10% of the cultivated land is now categorized as organically farmed, and 13.6% for the dairy industry, as of 2017.

Denmark has the highest retail consumption share for organic products in the world. In 2017, the share was at 13.3%, accounting for a total of DKK 12.1 billion.

=== Natural resource extraction ===
Denmark has large proven reserves of oil and natural gas in the North Sea with Esbjerg being the main city for the oil and gas industry. Production has decreased in recent years, though. Whereas in 2006 output (measured as gross value added or GVA) in mining and quarrying industries made up more than 4% of Denmark's total GVA, in 2023 it amounted to 1.1%. The sector is very capital-intensive, so the share of employment is much lower: About 1,000 persons worked in the oil and gas extraction sector in 2022, and another 1,000 persons in extraction of gravel and stone, or in total less than 0.1% of total employment in Denmark.

=== Engineering and high-tech ===
Denmark houses a number of significant engineering and high-technology firms, within the sectors of industrial equipment, aerospace, robotics, pharmaceutical and electronics. Denmark has one of the fastest growing biotech industries of any country, with a 11.8x growth in venture capital investment between 2016 to 2021. The Pharmaceutical sector has exploded since the approval of semaglutide (active ingredient of ozempic) by the FDA for weight management in 2021. From 2021 to 2022, the value of Danish pharmaceutical exports jumped from 136.8 million DKK to 157.7 million DKK in one year. The pharmaceutical industry is still the main driver of growth in the Danish Economy today, with 70% of growth in Q2 2025 coming from the sector. The increase in demand has also stimulated significant investment in research, manufacturing capacity, and high-skill employment. With Danske Bank reporting a more than doubling in venture capital investment into Danish biotech between 2020 to 2021.

==== Electronics and industrial equipment ====
Danfoss, headquartered in Nordborg, designs and manufactures industrial electronics, heating and cooling equipment, as well as drivetrains and power solutions.

Denmark is also a large exporter of pumps, with the company Grundfos holding 50% of the market share, manufacturing circulation pumps.

=== Manufacturing ===
In 2017, the total output (gross value added) in the manufacturing industry amounted to 14.4% of total output in Denmark. 325,000 people or a little less than 12% of all employed persons worked in manufacturing (including utilities, mining and quarrying) in 2016. Main sub-industries are manufacture of pharmaceuticals, machinery, and food products.

=== Service industry ===
In 2017, the total output (gross value added) in the service industry amounted to 75.2% of total output in Denmark, and 79.9% of all employed people worked in this industry in 2016. Apart from public administration, education and health services, main service sub-industries were trade and transport services, and business services.

=== Transport ===
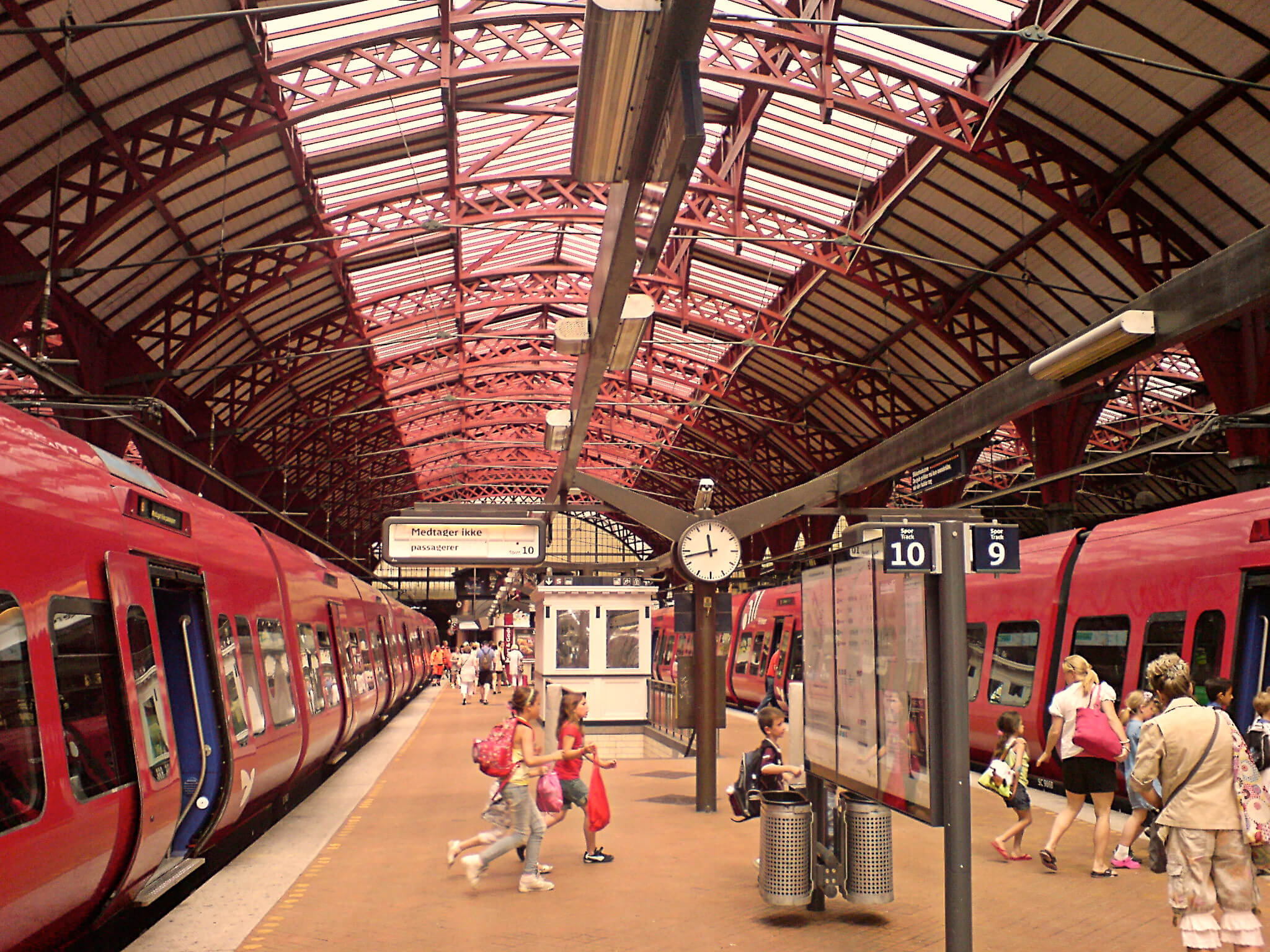
Copenhagen Central Station with S-Trains

Significant investment has been made in building road and rail links between Copenhagen and Malmö, Sweden (the Øresund Bridge), and between Zealand and Funen (the Great Belt Fixed Link). The Copenhagen Malmö Port was also formed between the two cities as the common port for the cities of both nations.

The main railway operator is Danske Statsbaner (Danish State Railways) for passenger services and DB Schenker Rail for freight trains. The railway tracks are maintained by Banedanmark. Copenhagen has a small Metro system, the Copenhagen Metro and the greater Copenhagen area has an extensive electrified suburban railway network, the S-train.

Private vehicles are increasingly used as a means of transport. New cars are taxed by means of a registration tax (85% to 150%) and VAT (25%). The motorway network now covers 1,300 km.

Denmark has established a prominent position in the integration of intermittent renewable energy sources, particularly wind power, into its national electricity grid. Building upon this expertise, the country has expanded its strategic focus toward the decarbonization of the transport sector. Central to this initiative is the large-scale integration of plug-in vehicles and the implementation of Vehicle-to-Grid (V2G) technology, which utilizes intelligent battery systems to enhance grid stability and energy storage capacity.

=== Energy ===
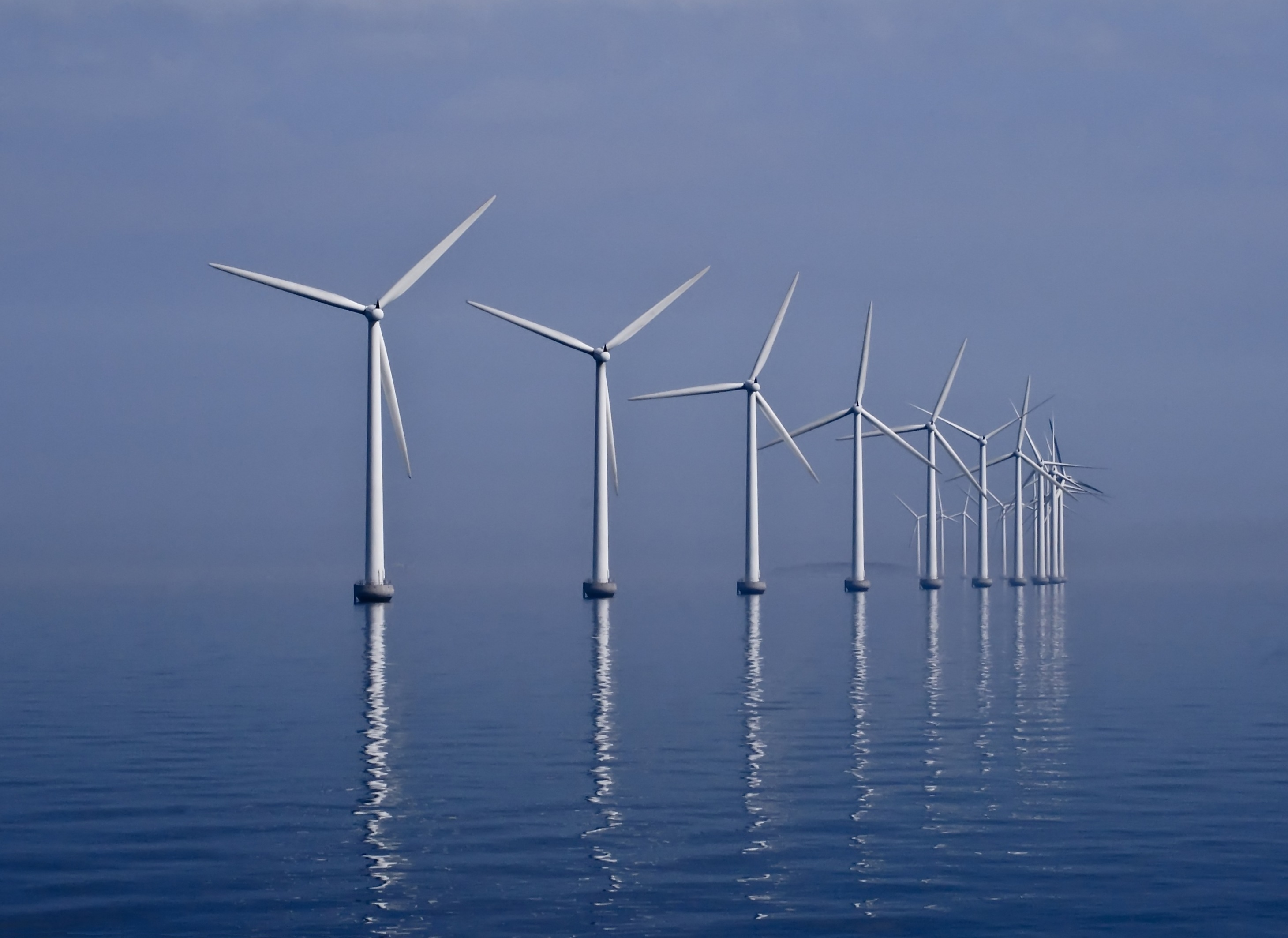
Denmark has invested heavily in windfarms. In 2015, 42% of the domestic electricity consumption comes from wind.

Fossil fuel consumption in Denmark

Denmark has changed its energy consumption from 99% fossil fuels (92% oil (all imported) and 7% coal) and 1% biofuels in 1972 to 73% fossil fuels (37% oil (all domestic), 18% coal, 18% natural gas (all domestic)), and 27% renewables (largely biofuels) in 2015. The goal is a full independence of fossil fuels by 2050. This drastic change was initially inspired largely by the discovery of Danish oil and gas reserves in the North Sea in 1972 and the 1973 oil crisis. The course took a giant leap forward in 1984, when the Danish North Sea oil and gas fields, developed by native industry in close cooperation with the state, started major production. In 1997, Denmark became self-sufficient with energy, and the overall CO_{2} emission from the energy sector began to fall by 1996. Wind energy contribution to the total energy consumption has risen from 1% in 1997 to 5% in 2015.

Since 2000, Denmark has increased gross domestic product (GDP) and at the same time decreased energy consumption. Since 1972, the overall energy consumption has dropped by 6%, even though the GDP has doubled in the same period. Denmark had the 6th best energy security in the world in 2014. Denmark has had relatively high energy taxation to encourage careful use of energy since the oil crises in the 1970s, and Danish industry has adapted to this and gained a competitive edge. The so-called "green taxes" have been broadly criticised partly for being higher than in other countries, but also for being more of a tool for gathering government revenue than a method of promoting "greener" behaviour.

2015 overall energy taxes, in billions DKK
	Oil	Gasoline	Natural gas	Coal	Electricity
Excise&VAT	9.3	7.3	3.3	2.5	11.7

Denmark has low electricity costs (including costs for cleaner energy) in the EU, but general taxes (11.7 billion DKK in 2015) make the electricity price for households the highest in Europe. As of 2015, Denmark has no environmental tax on electricity.

Denmark is a long-time leader in wind energy and a prominent exporter of Vestas and Siemens wind turbines, and in 2019 Denmark's exports of wind-turbine technology and services amounted to €8.9 billion. It has integrated fluctuating and less predictable energy sources such as wind power into the grid. Wind produced the equivalent of 43% of Denmark's total electricity consumption in 2017. The share of total energy production is smaller: In 2015, wind accounted for 5% of total Danish energy production.

Energinet.dk is the Danish national transmission system operator for electricity and natural gas. The electricity grids of western Denmark and eastern Denmark were not connected until 2010 when the 600MW Great Belt Power Link went into operation.

Cogeneration plants are the norm in Denmark, usually with district heating which serves almost 1.9 million households (January 1, 2025), 68% of all households.

Waste-to-energy incinerators produce mostly heating and hot water. Vestforbrænding in Glostrup Municipality operates Denmark's largest incinerator, a cogeneration plant which supplies electricity to 80,000 households and heating equivalent to the consumption in 63,000 households (2016). Amager Bakke is an example of a new incinerator.

== Greenland and the Faroe Islands ==
In addition to Denmark proper, the Kingdom of Denmark comprises two autonomous constituent countries in the North Atlantic Ocean: Greenland and the Faroe Islands. Both use the Danish krone as their currency, but form separate economies, having separate national accounts etc. Both countries receive an annual fiscal subsidy from Denmark which amounts to about 25% of Greenland's GDP and 11% of Faroese GDP. For both countries, the fishing industry is a major economic activity.

Neither Greenland nor the Faroe Islands are members of the European Union. Greenland left the European Economic Community in 1986, and the Faroe Islands declined membership in 1973, when Denmark joined.

== Data ==
The following table shows the main economic indicators in 1980–2026. Inflation under 2% is in green. Figures for 2026 are IMF projections.

Year	GDP (in bn. US$ PPP)	GDP per capita (in US$ PPP)	GDP (in bn. US$ nominal)	GDP growth (real)	Inflation rate (in Percent)	Unemployment (in Percent)	Government debt (in % of GDP)
1980	63.7	12,427	70.8	▼−0.7%	▲11.3%	5.2%	n/a
1981	▲69.2	▲13,497	▼61.5	▼−0.7%	▲11.7%	▲7.0%	n/a
1982	▲76.3	▲14,903	▼60.1	▲3.9%	▲10.1%	▲7.5%	n/a
1983	▲81.4	▲15,905	▲60.3	▲2.6%	▲6.8%	▲8.4%	n/a
1984	▲88.0	▲17,209	▼58.9	▲4.3%	▲6.3%	▼7.9%	n/a
1985	▲94.5	▲18,494	▲62.5	▲4.2%	▲4.7%	▼6.6%	n/a
1986	▲101.0	▲19,740	▲87.7	▲4.7%	▲3.7%	▼5.0%	n/a
1987	▲104.0	▲20,290	▲109.2	▲0.5%	▲4.0%	5.0%	n/a
1988	▲107.9	▲21,044	▲115.5	▲0.3%	▲4.5%	▲5.7%	n/a
1989	▲113.0	▲22,019	▼112.3	▲0.7%	▲4.8%	▲6.8%	n/a
1990	▲119.1	▲23,198	▲138.2	▲1.7%	▲2.6%	▲7.2%	n/a
1991	▲125.0	▲24,279	▲139.2	▲1.5%	▲2.5%	▲7.9%	n/a
1992	▲130.4	▲25,258	▲153.0	▲2.0%	▲2.0%	▲8.6%	66.7%
1993	▲133.4	▲25,744	▼143.1	▼−0.1%	▲0.9%	▲9.5%	▲78.7%
1994	▲143.4	▲27,600	▲156.0	▲5.3%	▲1.8%	▼7.7%	▼75.3%
1995	▲150.9	▲28,929	▲184.9	▲3.0%	▲2.0%	▼6.8%	▼71.5%
1996	▲158.1	▲30,109	▲187.5	▲2.9%	▲2.1%	▼6.3%	▼68.3%
1997	▲165.9	▲31,453	▼173.2	▲3.2%	▲2.0%	▼5.2%	▼64.4%
1998	▲171.7	▲32,425	▲176.9	▲2.3%	▲1.3%	▼4.9%	▼60.3%
1999	▲179.3	▲33,741	▲177.9	▲3.0%	▲2.0%	▲5.1%	▼56.8%
2000	▲190.2	▲35,679	▼164.0	▲3.7%	▲2.8%	▼4.3%	▼53.6%
2001	▲196.3	▲36,698	▲164.9	▲1.0%	▲2.3%	▲4.5%	▼50.1%
2002	▲200.3	▲37,304	▲178.8	▲0.5%	▲2.4%	▲4.6%	▲50.3%
2003	▲205.1	▲38,101	▲218.4	▲0.4%	▲2.0%	▲5.4%	▼48.2%
2004	▲216.5	▲40,107	▲252.0	▲2.8%	▲0.9%	▲5.5%	▼46.2%
2005	▲228.5	▲42,232	▲265.2	▲2.4%	▲1.7%	▼4.8%	▼39.4%
2006	▲244.6	▲45,064	▲283.4	▲3.8%	▲1.9%	▼3.9%	▼33.2%
2007	▲253.7	▲46,573	▲320.2	▲1.0%	▲1.7%	▼3.6%	▼29.5%
2008	▲257.5	▲47,024	▲355.0	▼−0.4%	▲3.6%	▼2.7%	▲35.5%
2009	▼246.2	▼44,668	▼322.6	▼−5.0%	▲1.1%	▲4.8%	▲43.0%
2010	▲253.1	▲45,734	▼322.3	▲1.6%	▲2.2%	▲6.1%	▲46.1%
2011	▲261.7	▲47,070	▲344.3	▲1.3%	▲2.7%	▼6.0%	▲50.0%
2012	▲266.6	▲47,773	▼326.8	0.0%	▲2.3%	▲6.1%	▼48.7%
2013	▲274.9	▲49,069	▲344.6	▲1.4%	▲0.5%	▼5.8%	▼47.8%
2014	▲283.3	▲50,340	▲352.8	▲1.3%	▲0.3%	▼5.0%	▲48.7%
2015	▲291.9	▲51,577	▼301.8	▲2.1%	▲0.2%	▼4.5%	▼44.6%
2016	▲303.8	▲53,222	▲312.2	▲3.1%	▲0.0%	▼4.1%	▼41.7%
2017	▲318.6	▲55,427	▲331.6	▲3.1%	▲1.1%	▲4.2%	▼40.2%
2018	▲331.6	▲57,357	▲355.3	▲1.9%	▲0.7%	▼3.9%	▼38.5%
2019	▲352.3	▲60,682	▼345.4	▲1.7%	▲0.7%	▼3.7%	▼38.3%
2020	▲365.5	▲62,775	▲355.6	▼−1.8%	▲0.3%	▲4.7%	▲45.2%
2021	▲409.7	▲70,152	▲406.1	▲6.5%	▲1.9%	▼3.6%	▼39.6%
2022	▲440.8	▲75,046	▼400.1	▲0.4%	▲8.6%	▼2.5%	▼33.3%
2023	▲459.9	▲77,513	▲404.7	▲0.6%	▲3.4%	▲2.8%	▼33.0%
2024	▲487.7	▲81,806	▲424.5	▲3.5%	▲1.3%	▲2.9%	▼30.5%
2025	▲515.9	▲86,094	▲461.7	▲2.9%	▲1.8%	2.9%	▼27.5%
2026	▲541.3	▲89,667	▲503.8	▲2.0%	▲2.0%	2.9%	▼27.4%

== Major companies ==
Denmark has fostered and is home to many multi-national companies. Many of the largest are interdisciplinary with business – and sometimes research activities – in several fields. The most notable companies include:

Agribusiness

- Arla Foods (dairy)
- Dansk Landbrugs Grovvareselskab (DLG) (agricultural coop (Danish a.m.b.a.). Main focus is agricultural supply and trade)
- Danish Crown (meat products)

Banking

- Danske Bank (commercial banking and mortgage lending)
- Nordea
- Nykredit
- Jyske Bank
- Saxo Bank
- Sydbank

Clothing and attire

- ECCO (shoe and leather accessories manufacturer and retailer)
- Bestseller

Construction

- FLSmidth (global supplier of equipment and services to the cement and minerals industries)
- Rockwool (mineral wool producer with production in 28 countries)
- Velux (windows and skylights production, owned by Villum Foundation)
- Rambøll
- COWI

Energy technology

- Vestas (wind turbines)
- Siemens Wind Power (wind turbines)
- Danfoss (climate and energy)
- Grundfos (the world's largest pump manufacturer)
- NKT A/S (Power cables and subsea umbilicals)
- Ørsted (company) (Formerly known as DONG energy)

Electronics

- Linak
- Bang and Olufsen (hi-fi equipment)
- Nilfisk
- Ortofon
- Danfoss

Food and drink

- Carlsberg (brewing company)
- Royal Unibrew
- Novonesis (food ingredients and enzymes)
- Danisco (enzymes, biotechnology and pharmaceutical supplier)

Insurance

- Alm. Brand
- Tryg

Medical equipment

- Widex
- William Demant

Pharmaceutical and biotechnology

Many of the largest food producers are also engaged in biotechnology and research. Notable companies dedicated to the pharmaceutical and biotechnology sector, includes:

- H. Lundbeck
- Novo
- LEO Pharma
- Coloplast
- Dansac (owner Hollister Inc)
- Novozymes
- Pharma Nord
- Pharmacosmos
- ALK-Abelló
- Genmab
- RosePharma
- Santaris Pharma A/S
- Veloxis Pharmaceuticals
- Zealand Pharma

Retail

- Salling Group (retail business)
- Coop Danmark, (part of the multi-sector Coop amba, formerly known as FDB until 2013)
- Dagrofa

Transport

- A. P. Moller-Maersk Group (Maersk – conglomerate: shipping)
- Blue Water Shipping
- DFDS
- DSV
- Scan Global Logistics
- USTC (conglomerate: shipping, trading)

Miscellaneous

- ISS (facility services)
- The Lego Group, as of 2014 the world's largest toy manufacturer by sales (in the first half of 2015, it made $2.1 billion in sales)
- Terma A/S, aerospace and defense

=== Cooperatives ===
Denmark has a long tradition for cooperative production and trade on a large scale. The most notable cooperative societies today includes the agricultural coop of Dansk Landbrugs Grovvareselskab (DLG), dairy producer Arla Foods and the retail cooperative Coop Danmark. Coop Danmark started out as "Fællesforeningen for Danmarks Brugsforeninger" (FDB) in 1896 and now has around 1.4 million members in Denmark as of 2017. It is part of the larger multi-sector cooperative Coop amba which has 1.7 million members in that same year.

The cooperative structure also extends to both the housing and banking sector. Arbejdernes Landsbank, founded in 1919, is the largest bank cooperative and it is currently the 6th largest bank in the country as of 2018. The municipality of Copenhagen alone holds a total of 153 housing cooperatives and "Arbejdernes Andelsboligforening Århus" (AAB Århus) is the largest individual housing cooperative in Denmark, with 23,000 homes in Aarhus.

=== Statistics ===
In 2022, the sector with the highest number of companies registered in Denmark is Finance, Insurance, and Real Estate with 204,853 companies followed by Services and Retail Trade with 204,050 and 30,563 companies respectively.

== See also ==
- List of Danish companies
- Tourism in Denmark
