= List of companies of Denmark =

Location of Denmark

Denmark is a Scandinavian country in Europe. The country has a developed mixed economy that is classed as a high-income economy by the World Bank. It ranks 18th in the world in terms of GDP (PPP) per capita and 6th in nominal GDP per capita. Denmark's economy stands out as one of the most free in the Index of Economic Freedom and the Economic Freedom of the World. It is the 13th most competitive economy in the world, and 8th in Europe, according to the World Economic Forum in its Global Competitiveness Report 2014–2015.

For further information on the types of business entities in this country and their abbreviations, see "Business entities in Denmark".

== Largest firms ==
This list displays all Danish companies in the Fortune Global 500, which ranks the world's largest companies by annual revenue. The figures below are given in millions of US dollars and are for the fiscal year 2023.

Fortune 500 rank	Name	Industry	Revenue (USD millions)	Profits (USD millions)	Employees	Headquarters
151	Maersk Group	Transportation	51,065	3,822	105,909	Copenhagen
469	Novo	Pharmaceuticals	33,708	12,143	63,845	Bagsværd

== Notable firms ==
This list includes notable companies with primary headquarters located in the country. The industry and sector follow the Industry Classification Benchmark taxonomy. Organizations which have ceased operations are included and noted as defunct.

Notable companies Status: P=Private, S=State; A=Active, D=Defunct
Name	Industry	Sector	Headquarters	Founded	Notes	Status	
Alectia	Industrials	Business support services	Virum	1912	Business consulting	P	A
ALK-Abelló	Health care	Pharmaceuticals	Hørsholm	1923	Pharmaceuticals	P	A
Aller Media	Consumer services	Publishing	Copenhagen	1873	Magazines	P	A
Alm. Brand	Financials	Full line insurance	Copenhagen	1792	Financial services	P	A
Ambu	Health care	Medical equipment	Copenhagen	1937	Health care support	P	A
Arkitema Architects	Industrials	Business support services	Aarhus	1969	Architecture	P	A
Arla Foods	Consumer goods	Food products	Viby J	2000	Food cooperative, dairy	P	A
Bang & Olufsen	Consumer goods	Consumer electronics	Struer	1925	Audio, electronics	P	A
Bestseller A/S	Consumer goods	Clothing & accessories	Brande	1975	Clothing	P	A
Bjarke Ingels Group	Industrials	Business support services	Copenhagen	2005	Architecture	P	A
BoConcept	Consumer services	Specialty retailers	Herning	1952	Furniture and design	P	A
Brødrene Hartmann	Industrials	Containers & packaging	Gentofte	1917	Packaging	P	A
C. F. Møller Architects	Industrials	Business support services	Aarhus	1922	Architecture	P	A
Carlsberg Group	Consumer goods	Brewers	Copenhagen	1847	Brewing	P	A
Cembrit	Industrials	Building materials & fixtures	Aalborg	1927	Fibre cement manufacturer	P	A
Chr. Hansen	Consumer goods	Food products	Hørsholm	1874	Food, agriculture	P	A
COBE Architects	Industrials	Business support services	Copenhagen	2005	Architecture	P	A
Coloplast	Health care	Medical equipment	Fredensborg	1957	Medical devices	P	A
Coop amba	Consumer services	Food retailers & wholesalers	Copenhagen	1896	Supermarkets, formerly FDB	P	A
COWI	Industrials	Business support services	Kongens Lyngby	1930	Consulting	P	A
D/S Norden	Industrials	Marine transportation	Hellerup	1871	Shipping	P	A
Dampskibsselskabet Torm	Industrials	Marine transportation	Copenhagen	1889	Shipping	P	A
Danfoss	Industrials	Industrial machinery	Nordborg	1933	Industrial equipment	P	A
Danisco	Health care	Biotechnology	Copenhagen	1989	Biopharma	P	A
Danish Agro	Industrials	Industrial machinery	Karise	1901	Farm supply	P	A
Danish Crown AmbA	Consumer goods	Food products	Randers	1998	Food processing	P	A
Dansk Supermarked	Consumer services	Broadline retailers	Højbjerg	1964	Retail chain	P	A
Danske Bank	Financials	Banks	Copenhagen	1871	Bank	P	A
Dantherm	Industrials	Industrial machinery	Skive	1958	Climate control solutions	P	A
DFDS	Industrials	Marine transportation	Copenhagen	1866	Shipping, logistics	P	A
Dissing+Weitling	Industrials	Business support services	Copenhagen	1971	Architecture	P	A
DLF	Consumer goods	Farming & fishing	Roskilde	1906	Seed producer	P	A
DSB	Industrials	Railroads	Copenhagen	1885	Railway	P	A
DSV	Industrials	Delivery services	Hedehusene	1976	Transport and logistics	P	A
DT Group	Industrials	Building materials & fixtures	Copenhagen	1896	Building materials	P	A
Dynaudio	Consumer goods	Consumer electronics	Skanderborg	1977	Audio electronics	P	A
ECCO	Consumer goods	Footwear	Bredebro	1963	Shoes	P	A
Egmont Group	Consumer services	Publishing	Copenhagen	1878	Media	P	A
Elwis	Industrials	Building materials & fixtures	Gentofte	1938	Lighting	P	A
Falck	Health care	Health care providers	Copenhagen	1906	Healthcare	P	A
FLSmidth	Industrials	Industrial machinery	Copenhagen	1882	Engineering	P	A
Flying Tiger Copenhagen	Consumer services	Braodline retailers	Copenhagen	1995	Stores	P	A
Foss A/S	Industrials	Business support services	Hillerød	1956	Food services analytical solutions	P	A
Global Risk Management	Industrials	Business support services	Middelfart	2004	Fuel price risk management	P	A
GN Store Nord	Health care	Health care providers	Ballerup	1869	Audiological diagnostics	P	A
Grundfos	Industrials	Industrial machinery	Bjerringbro	1945	Pumps	P	A
Gryphon Audio Designs	Consumer goods	Consumer electronics	Ry	1985	Audio equipment	P	A
Hempel Group	Basic materials	Specialty chemicals	Lyngby-Taarbæk	1915	Coatings	P	A
Henning Larsen Architects	Industrials	Business support services	Copenhagen	1959	Architecture	P	A
Hummel	Consumer goods	Clothing & accessories	Aarhus	1923	Sportswear	P	A
IC Group	Consumer goods	Clothing & accessories	Copenhagen	2001	Clothing	P	A
ISS A/S	Industrials	Business support services	Copenhagen	1901	Facility services	P	A
Jet Time	Consumer services	Airlines	Copenhagen	2006	Airline, defunct 2020	P	D
Jorgensen Engineering	Industrials	Business support services	Odense	1933	Engineering	P	A
Jysk	Consumer services	Specialty retailers	Aarhus	1979	Retail chain	P	A
Jyske Bank	Financials	Banks	Silkeborg	1967	Bank	P	A
Kemp & Lauritzen	Industrials	Business support services	Copenhagen	1882	Engineering	P	A
LastObject	Consumer goods	Personal products	Copenhagen	2016	Sustainable personal care products	P	A
Leo Pharma	Health care	Pharmaceuticals	Copenhagen	1908	Pharmaceuticals	P	A
LM Glasfiber	Industrials	Industrial machinery	Lunderskov	1940	Wind power equipment	P	A
Louis Poulsen	Industrials	Building materials & fixtures	Copenhagen	1874	Lighting	P	A
Lundbeck	Health care	Pharmaceuticals	Copenhagen	1915	Pharmaceuticals	P	A
Lundgaard & Tranberg	Industrials	Business support services	Copenhagen	1983	Architecture	P	A
Maersk	Conglomerates	Ocean and inland freight transportation	Copenhagen	1904	Transportation, energy	P	A
Martin Professional	Industrials	Building materials & fixtures	Aarhus	1987	Lighting	P	A
Matas	Consumer services	Drug retailers	Allerød	1949	Drug stores	P	A
MUUSE	Consumer services	Apparel retailers	Copenhagen	2011	Fashion brand, defunct 2015	P	D
Netcompany	Technology	Software	Copenhagen	1999	Software consultancy	P	A
NKT Holding	Conglomerates	-	Copenhagen	1891	Conglomerate	P	A
NNIT	Technology	Software	Gladsaxe	1994	Software consultancy	P	A
North Media	Consumer services	Publishing	Gladsaxe	1978	Media group	P	A
North Sea Capital	Financials	Financial services	Copenhagen	2001	Private equity advising	P	A
Novo	Health care	Pharmaceuticals	Copenhagen	1923	Pharmaceuticals	P	A
Novozymes	Health care	Biotechnology	Copenhagen	2000	Biotech	P	A
Nykredit	Financials	Financial services	Copenhagen	1985	Financial services	P	A
Ørsted	Utilities	Conventional electricity	Fredericia	2006	Power and natural gas	P	A
Pandora (jewelry)	Consumer goods	Jewellery Retailer	Copenhagen	1982	Jewellery	P	A
Parken Sport & Entertainment	Consumer services	Recreational services	Copenhagen	1992	Sports	P	A
Pharma Nord	Health care	Pharmaceuticals	Vejle	1981	Pharmaceuticals	P	A
Pharmacosmos	Health care	Pharmaceuticals	Holbæk	1965	Pharmaceuticals	P	A
Phase One	Consumer goods	Recreational products	Copenhagen	1993	Photography	P	A
Plesner	Industrials	Business support services	Copenhagen	1918	Law firm	P	A
Post Danmark	Industrials	Delivery services	Copenhagen	1624	Postal	P	A
Ramboll	Industrials	Business support services	Copenhagen	1945	Engineering	P	A
Roskilde Forsyning	Utilities	Conventional electricity	Roskilde	2000	Local utility company	P	A
Royal Copenhagen	Consumer goods	Durable household products	Copenhagen	1775	Porcelain	P	A
Sampension	Financials	Asset managers	Copenhagen	1945	Financial services	P	A
Santa Fe Group	Industrials	Logistics	Copenhagen	1897	Logistics	P	D
Saxo Bank	Financials	Banks	Copenhagen	1992	Financial services	P	A
Schmidt Hammer Lassen	Industrials	Business support services	Copenhagen	1986	Architecture	P	A
Select Sport	Consumer goods	Recreational products	Copenhagen	1947	Sporting goods	P	A
Simonsen & Weel	Health care	Medical equipment	Vallensbæk	1817	Health sector equipment	P	A
Stibo	Technology	Enterprise software	Århus	1794	International information management	P	A
STYLEPIT	Consumer services	Apparel retailers	Copenhagen	2000	Fashion retailer	P	A
Sydbank	Financials	Banks	Aabenraa	1970	Bank	P	A
TDC A/S	Telecommunications	Fixed line telecommunications	Copenhagen	1879	Telecommunications	P	A
Terma A/S	Industrials	Aerospace	Lystrup	1949	Defense, aerospace	P	A
The Lego Group	Consumer goods	Toys	Billund	1932	Plastic bricks	P	A
Thorco Shipping	Industrials	Marine transportation	Copenhagen	2003	Shipping	P	A
Topsoe	Basic materials	Specialty chemicals	Copenhagen	1940	Chemicals	P	A
Tryg	Financials	Full line insurance	Copenhagen	2002	Financial services	P	A
United Shipping & Trading Company	Industrials	Marine transportation	Middelfart	1876	Shipping	P	A
Universal Robots	Industrials	Industrial machinery	Odense	2005	Industrial robots	P	A
VELUX	Industrials	Building materials & fixtures	Hørsholm	1941	Windows	P	A
Vestas	Industrials	Industrial machinery	Aarhus	1945	Wind turbines	P	A
Welltec	Oil & gas	Oil equipment & services	Allerød	1994	Oil and gas wells	P	A
Widex	Health care	Medical equipment	Lynge	1956	Hearing aids	P	A
William Demant	Health care	Health care providers	Ledøje-Smørum	1904	Health care	P	A

== See also ==
- Economy of Denmark
