= Elwis =

Danish manufacturing company

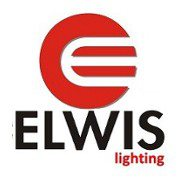
- Company type: Private company
- Industry: Technology
- Founded: 1938
- Founder: Mogens Wilsbech
- Headquarters: Gentofte, Denmark
- Key people: Mogens Wilsbech
- Products: Flashlights, Handlamps, Headlamps, Task lamps, Gaskets.
- Website: elwis.com

Elwis, Elwis Royal or Elwis Lighting is a Danish technology company, founded in 1938 by Mogens Wilsbech, which designs and manufactures inspection lighting, handlamps, flashlights and gaskets. It sells products in over 30 countries worldwide. Elwis’ founder, Mogens Wilsbech famously created the first functional fluorescent handlamp, in a workshop near his house in 1953.

== History ==
In 1938, Wilsbech founded the company and in the early 1950s, he discovered a number of problems with the conventional incandescent worklights available. This developed his idea to encase a fluorescent bulb in a resilient, clear, butyrate tube. This was marketed as a "Light in a tube" originally with a 21-inch fluorescent bulb encased.

Elwis continues to manufacture fluorescent handlamps in Denmark, which have been a workshop essential for service departments, gasoline service stations and repair garages. The company now has two main divisions; Elwis Lighting manufactures a range of advanced Surface Mounted Diode (SMD) and Chip On Board (COB) Light-emitting diode (LED) worklamps, trouble lights and high specification torches for mechanics. Elwis Royal manufactures a range of gaskets to fit a wide variety of automotive vehicles.
