= Unemployment benefits in Denmark =

Denmark is a Scandinavian country in Europe consisting of the Jutland Peninsula and numerous islands. Typically, Denmark has had relatively low unemployment rates. Currently, Denmark has generous unemployment benefits in the form of private insurance funds. Unemployment benefits are typically payments made by the state or other authorized actors to unemployed persons.

== History ==
To receive unemployment benefits in Denmark, one must be a part of a voluntary insurance fund and meet all requirements before receiving any benefits. Danish unemployment hit a peak in 1993 with 12.4 percent unemployment. Since then, Denmark has seen a steady decline in unemployment rates, bottoming at 2.4 percent in 2007. This significant decrease in unemployment is attributed to Denmark's emphasis on active labour market policies (ALMP) throughout the 1990s; which sought to help workers obtain the skills needed to create a successful labour market. The Danish labour market is infused with a high degree of job mobility. The average job length in Denmark is 8 years, making it one of the lowest among the OECD countries. The system of labour market flexibility provides workers with a high level of benefits and allows employers to hire and fire employees with ease. This combination has been in place in Denmark since the 1970s, but the high costs of public benefits eventually began to strain government finances. Therefore, in the 1990s there was policy change that led to an emphasis on private insurance funds.

The 1990s saw a decade of unemployment benefit insurance reform in Denmark. Government policy addressing employment security however, remained largely unchanged. Prior to the early 1990s reforms, Danish citizens were entitled to 2.5 years of unemployment benefits given they remained employed for 26 weeks out of the previous 3 years. During their unemployment benefit collection period, citizens were entitled by law to receive subsidized employment for 7–9 months. If employed under this program, individuals were then once again subject to receive another 2.5 years of unemployment benefits, essentially allowing for unlimited unemployment benefits. The reforms of the decade were devised to place an upper limit on entitlement to unemployment benefits. In 1995, the entitlement period for unemployment benefits was limited to 5 years, with a requirement for employment for 1 year in the past 3 years. Three years later, the maximum length of the unemployment benefit entitlement period was shortened to 4 years for individuals over the age of 25. These reforms have resulted in an average shorter length of unemployment period for Danish since when compared to pre-1990s statistics. More recent unemployment benefit policies have dealt with cash benefit reform. In 2013, the Danish government implemented a reform that aimed to reduce the amount of cash benefits given to unemployed youth, and instead transform those payments into education benefits in order to pursue its "usefulness initiative". These new cash benefit policies have had a positive effect on the flow of young adults away from unemployment and into education or employment.

== Current policy ==
Currently, the legislation which encompasses the policies of these benefits is The Act on Unemployment Insurance, which is executed by the Danish Agency for Labour Market and Recruitment under the Ministry of Employment. In order to become eligible for unemployment benefits, one must become part of one of the twenty four private and state approved Insurance funds; these funds are commonly known in Denmark as A-kasser's or A-kasse. To receive benefits through an insurance fund, one must be a part of the fund for at least one year prior to unemployment, register with the Public Employment Service, and fulfil a waiting period if unemployment is self-imposed. According to the government, registration with the Public Employment Service, also known as the jobcentret, must occur on the first day of a person's unemployment. From here, the claimant is required to specify the industry in which they wish to work, create a CV and look at jobs suggested for them every seventh day, in order to actively seek employment. The benefits received are contingent on one's registration with the Public Employment Service; the individual's insurance fund then assesses the benefits that they are to receive. The amount paid by their insurance fund depends on age, educational attainment, full or part time status and previous salary.

Employment benefits in Denmark can involve up to 90 percent wage reimbursement per month for a maximum period of three years. Additionally, those who obtain part-time employment are able to receive what is known as a supplementary benefit. A supplementary benefit compensates for the remainder of a wage in order to provide a full time wage for a maximum period of 30 weeks. In Denmark, those not registered with an insurance fund may be eligible to receive some benefits through the state, depending on certain qualifications. The difference here is that these benefits are paid direct though a citizen's municipality. Recently, there have been changes to this generous benefit system. Beginning in 2019, only those who have lived in Denmark, Greenland, the Faroe Islands or some other European Union or European Economic Area country for seven out of the past eight years will be eligible to receive unemployment benefits. Additionally, reforms have been made regarding self-employment and non-standard employment policy in Denmark. These new criteria will take into account a company's overall revenue, tax constraints and type of industry when assigning new benefits in an effort to ensure that wage earning does accurately meet the needs of all workers. While there is much new research on active labour market policies in Denmark; some of the research has been inconclusive about the factors that have contributed to the success of such ALMP policies, including unemployment benefits.

=== Worker Activation ===
One of the identifiable features of Denmark's labor market and unemployment benefit policies is the high re-activation rate observed in its labor market. The Danish government provides considerable unemployment aid in the way of government programs focused on getting displaced laborers back to work. Weak job protection policies result in a high rate of labor turnover in the country, but effective job activation policies have ensured that the period of unemployment suffered by displaced workers remains short. As noted by the OECD, "seven displaced workers out of ten get back into work within one year". This statistic can be mainly attributed to the reduction in unemployment benefits by way of reforms during the 1990s and early 2000s and also to the effectual active labor market programs instituted in Denmark. In the Danish labor market, active labor market policy agencies have successfully served as intermediaries between employers and job seekers. These agencies have been particularly successful in helping economically disadvantaged groups and workers on the outskirts of the labor market through pre-employment training, job searching, CV writing, and subsidized "work trials", which allow employers and employees to measure the future success of candidates in their desired position.

== See also ==
- Unemployment benefits
