= Jorgensen Engineering =

Danish firm

- Company type: Publicly traded limited company
- Industry: Engineering
- Founded: 1933
- Headquarters: Odense, Denmark
- Area served: Worldwide
- Key people: Jens Nyeng (CEO),
- Revenue: DKK 250 million (2014/2015)
- Net income: DKK 15 million (2014/2015)
- Number of employees: 150 (October 2015)
- Website: jorgensen.dk

Jorgensen Engineering A/S is a Danish processing equipment-supplier with headquarters in Odense.

== History ==
Jorgensen Engineering was established in 1933, under the name of Bøg Jørgensens Maskinfabrik by engineer Rasmus Bøg Jørgensen. After having worked in the United States for 10 years, Mr. Jørgensen had gained experience in the field of constructions, and in 1935 the first canning machines were made. From then on, processing equipment was the core business, and today, Jorgensen Engineering mainly supplies systems for handling food, pet food, and pharmaceutical packaging. Rasmus Bøg Jørgensen was in front of the company until 1955, when his son, engineer Paul Bøg Rasmussen took over. Under his management, export was heavily expanded, and in 1974 the company of Jorgensen Food Engineering ApS was established. In 1987, the company was made public and took the name of Jorgensen Engineering A/S. In 2016, Jorgensen Engineering becomes a member of the Swedish Xano Group.

== Products ==
- Conveying systems for packaging (cans, glass jars, cartons, bottles, bags, and plastic packaging)
- Loading/unloading stations for retorts
- Palletizing/depalletizing
- Sterilization & cleaning systems
- Filling lines for milk powder
- Automation/control systems
- Robotics
- Equipment for quality assurance and food safety
