= MUUSE =

Fashion company

MUUSE is a privately owned fashion company based in Copenhagen, Denmark, that specializes in developing, manufacturing, and marketing designs created by independent fashion designers. The company employs talent scouts and sponsors contests to carefully select designers to collaborate with. Through this collaboration, the chosen designers receive royalties based on the sales of their designs.

== History ==
MUUSE was founded in 2011 by David Dencker (CEO) and Gitte Jonsdatter (Strategy Director).

== Talent Scouting ==
MUUSE staff actively collaborate with fashion institutions and serve on their graduation show juries. They also receive recommendations for talented individuals from these institutions. Additionally, twice a year, MUUSE and VOGUE Talents jointly organize an online contest where designers can showcase their work. The winner of this contest is awarded the prestigious MUUSE x VOGUE Talents Young Vision Award. The competition winner is featured in VOGUE Talents, a publication by Vogue, and is granted the opportunity to collaborate with MUUSE in producing a capsule collection, among other prizes. The 2012 contest, for instance, garnered over 300 entries and 150,000 votes, with the ultimate winner being Heidi Paula. Furthermore, in 2016, the winner, Pamela Samasuwo Nyawiri, was awarded a scholarship to Harvard University.

== Collaborative Product Development ==
MUUSE Designers are responsible for the design of styles, while the MUUSE production staff takes care of sourcing textiles, negotiating with manufacturers, quality control and fitting. There are two types of clothing produced: Ready-to-Wear and Couture. Ready-to-Wear pieces are produced in small batches of between 20 and 100 pieces. Production outsourced to small manufacturers in Europe and Asia. Couture pieces are sewn to-order by MUUSE tailors to fit the buyer's measurements, matching the designer's prototypes, with alterations for wearability and to meet requests from buyers.

== Sales model ==
Pieces are sold under the designer's name, labelled ‘(Designer Name) by MUUSE’. The clothing is sold via the company's online boutique and through online and offline retail partners in Europe. The products are shipped to Europe and the United States.
