= Simonsen & Weel =

Danish healthcare equipment supplier

Simonsen & Weel A/S
- Industry: Health care
- Founded: 1817; 208 years ago
- Founder: I.I. Weel
- Owner: Julius Lippmann family; Vickers plc (1988–1997); Bure Equity (1997–2003); Rolf Bladt and Torben Bjerring
- Website: sw.dk

Simonsen & Weel A/S is Denmark's oldest supplier of equipment to the Danish health sector, with a history dating back to 1817. The company sells products from several international manufacturers of medical equipment, OR tables, compression stockings, medical nutrition etc. The company has also developed their own pressure relieving bed mattresses, table mattresses and positioning pads under the brand name ESWELL.

== History ==
- 1817 Simonsen & Weel is founded by wholesaler I.I. Weel
- 1864 Hiring of Julius Lippmann, whose family since the end of the 1880s owns the company during four generations
- 1906 Simonsen & Weel becomes purveyor to HM the Queen of Denmark
- 1939 Ole Lippmann introduces the first anesthesia apparatus
- 1988 Simonsen & Weel Medico Teknik is sold to Vickers plc, and Simonsen & Weel continues as a distribution agency in Denmark
- 1997 Simonsen & Weel is sold to Bure Equity, and in the same year becomes part of the Swedish Simonsen Group
- 2003 Simonsen & Weel is back to Danish ownership with majority shareholder Rolf Bladt as managing director and Torben Bjerring as co-owner and Vice President
- 2007 Simonsen & Weel develops and introduces its own program of mattresses and positioning pads for the Operating Theatre under the brand ESWELL
- 2008 Simonsen & Weel receives the first export orders of ESWELL
- 2010 Simonsen & Weel buys stake in UNICDOC (with international sales rights of the UNICDOC picture and video documentation system)
