= RosePharma =

Pharmaceutical company

Rose Pharma is a private company that was founded in 2003 as Gastrotech Pharma and is located in Copenhagen, Denmark. The company is led by CEO Leif Helth Jensen, who is, together with Michael Forer and Florian Schönharting, also member of the Board of Directors. Rose Pharma is a clinical stage biotechnology company focused on the development of novel treatments for IBS and anorexia/cachexia associated with cancer and other major pathologies.

== History ==
Rose Pharma was formerly known as Gastrotech Pharma and founded in 2003. It has a core interest in gastroenterology and was initially established to exploit novel peptide hormones regulating GI and nutritional function. Rose Pharma currently works mainly in the research and development of its main drug, ROSE-010.

== Products ==
ROSE-010 is a pharmaceutical therapy intended to treat pain symptoms of irritable bowel syndrome. The pharmaceutical, ROSE-010 mimics the hormone GLP-1 which modulates smooth muscle contractions and thus reduces spasms associated with IBS. ROSE-010 must be administered subcutaneously or intravenously. A phase II double-blinded placebo controlled trial in Europe demonstrated efficacy of this approach, and a phase I/II trial in the US established the safety of this concept also in IBS patients with predominant constipation. These clinical data, together with the preclinical data generated by Rose Pharma, provide the rationale for this peptide hormone based therapy for acute pain attacks in IBS.

== Partnerships ==
Rose Pharma is currently funded by CAT Invest, Nordic Biotech, BML Healthcare and 123MultiNova Europe. In 2008, Rose Pharma signed an agreement with Eli Lilly and Company (Indianapolis, United States) to in-license a Lilly compound (formerly known as LY307161, now named ROSE-010), an analogue of the naturally occurring intestinal hormone GLP-1. The licensing agreement is a result of an ongoing research collaboration the two companies have participated in since 2004.
