= Small open economy =

A small open economy, abbreviated to SOE, is an economy that participates in international trade, but is small enough compared to its trading partners that its policies do not alter world prices, interest rates, or incomes. Thus, the countries with small open economies are price takers. This is unlike a large open economy, the actions of which do affect world prices and income.

For example, if the U.S. economy is in recession then the world economy is likely to suffer. On the other hand, a recession in a small open economy like Norway will likely not impact the world economy to a great extent.

The theory of a small open economy is used in the study of macroeconomics to model a price-taking economy, allowing exogenous assumptions of the conditions in the rest of the world.
