= Active labor market policies in Denmark =

Denmark is the country that invests the most in active labor market policies among members of the Organisation for Economic Co-operation and Development to maintain labor force participation, and social mobility over time in order to improve market efficiency.

== Background ==
Active labour market policies (ALMP) are used to maintain labor force participation, and social mobility over time in order to improve market efficiency . The focus of these policies can vary depending on the challenges faced in promoting or retaining labor force participation through the use of socially progressive policies. More specifically, these types of policies are employed as a measure for reducing bouts of high unemployment, but do not necessarily focus on creating more jobs within the labor market.

In Denmark, the country's Social Democracy was first established during the end of the 19th century, after serious labor conflicts that led to the recognition of trade union rights. The resulting labor agreements severely limited the right to strike and disrupt production, in exchange for union involvement in the crafting of labor policy. Over the last century, labor organization have retained this influence on policy, with the state taking charge of much of the cost associated to skill development and other social aspects of the work. The Danish welfare-through-work approach that evolved is based on this compromise.

== 1990s ==
During the 1990s Denmark had implemented a variety of ALMP strategies that focused on the restructuring of its welfare state through a 'welfare-through-work' model. This model formulated the ALMP strategies based on three critical principles:

1. the basis of need,
2. decentralization, and
3. actively involved social partners.

By 1994, Denmark had begun to implement the focus its labor policy reforms on ALMP policies geared towards promoting access to educational leave and employment training offers that were later translated into the Active Social Policy Act of 1998. Between 1998 and 2002, Denmark spent on average 1.7% of its total GDP on ALMPs and was one of the biggest spenders among Nordic social market economies.

Post-1994 policies were delegated to local governments and were primarily geared toward reducing the period during which unemployed workers could receive benefits, which in turn, emphasized the salience of educational leave programs that provided forms of vocational training and supervised work-based experience. Most ALMPs that were being promoted during this decade were aimed at maintaining unemployment levels at a steady rate and effectively mobilizing the unemployed, a practice named activation.

== 21st Century ==
Following the turn of the century, the 2007-08 Great Recession promoted a healthy economic growth and resilient demand of labor which, in turn, resulted in a low ratio of available jobs and a high level of unemployed job seekers. The changing economic situation constituted a challenge to the effectiveness of pre-established ALMPs in Denmark and other OECD countries. Initial increases in the investment into ALMPs proved necessary in order to adjust for the economic downturn. In a 2015 report on public expenditures on activation policies, Denmark was listed as the top country investing in ALMP programs, spending 2.05% of GDP that year.
