= North Sea Capital =

Independent private equity advisor based in Copenhagen, Denmark

- Company type: Private
- Industry: Private Equity; Investment Management
- Founded: 2001
- Headquarters: Copenhagen, Denmark
- Website: www.northseacapital.com

North Sea Capital, based in Copenhagen, is an independent private equity adviser that serves institutional and high-net-worth clients including some of the largest Nordic pension funds. North Sea Capital provides investors with access to top tier private equity managers and also provides advisory services within the private equity asset class. The geographic focus is global, including USA, Europe, and Emerging Markets. Since 2001, North Sea Capital has been advising investors to commit capital to strategies focused primarily on middle market buyout and special situation funds but also to venture, growth capital and balanced strategy funds. North Sea Capital also advises investors on private equity mandates including secondaries and co-investments.

== History ==
The senior professionals of North Sea Capital started out as Nordea Private Equity, a unit of Nordea Investment Management, the asset management arm of the Nordea Group. On the back of a demand for private equity products from both institutional and private banking clients, Nordea and the senior investment professionals of Nordea Private Equity decided to pursue a strategy of creating a leading independent European private equity adviser. As a result of this decision, as of January 2007, the entire investment team of Nordea Private Equity was spun off into a new separate company, North Sea Capital, owned solely by the senior investment professionals. At the same time North Sea Capital was appointed exclusive private equity adviser to Nordea Investment Management.
