= Pharma Nord =

Danish pharmaceutical company

- Type: Private
- Industry: Pharmaceuticals
- Founded: 1981
- Headquarters: Vejle, Denmark
- Key people: Eli Wallin, Owner; Sven Moesgaard, Owner
- Products: dietary supplements
- Website: pharmanord.com

Pharma Nord is a Danish pharmaceutical company based in Vejle. It has a manufacturing facility and research laboratories in Vojens, Denmark. Pharma Nord has 25 daughter companies throughout Europe, Asia, North America and the Middle East. Pharma Nord is a privately owned limited company.

== History ==
Pharma Nord was founded in 1981 by the two current owners, Eli Wallin and Sven Moesgaard, who established an import of a British selenium dietary supplement. Soon after, the product was further developed into the product sold today as Bio-Selenium+Zinc, which is still a cornerstone of Pharma Nord's product range. The commercial success of Bio-Selenium+Zinc paved the road for the first daughter companies that were established in Sweden, England and Finland.

In 1988, Pharma Nord (UK) was established to import products from Denmark to the UK market.

In 1990, Pharma Nord was the first company to introduce a coenzyme Q10 product (ubiquinone) on the European market after it was discovered in 1957 by Frederick Crane at Purdue University in Indiana.

In June 2005, ground for the first DKK 150 million (USD 27 million) factory was broken by the Minister for Food, Agriculture and Fisheries Hans Christian Schmidt, expanding Pharma Nord's production facilities in Vojens, Jutland.

In 2007, Pharma Nord was ranked as numamonggineer-related businesses by the weekly newspaper Ingeniøren.

Pharma Nord products are currently retailed in more than 45 countries.

== Business areas ==
Pharma Nord develops, manufactures and markets dietary supplements, herbal remedies and medical drugs.

Pharma Nord's product range contains products in the following categories:

- Vitamins
- Minerals
- Multivitamin and mineral products
- Coenzyme Q10
- Essential fatty acids
- Herbal remedies
- Beauty products
- Slimming products
- Medical drugs

== Research and manufacturing ==
Pharma Nord's products, both medical drugs and dietary supplements, are manufactured in accordance with the current Good Manufacturing Practice (GMP) and Hazard Analysis and Critical Control Points (HACCP) guidelines. The production of medical drugs is regulated by GMP, and dietary supplements are regulated by HACCP. Pharma Nord applies the strictest rules from either regulation to all aspects of production.

Pharma Nord's selenium dietary supplement SelenoPrecise is currently used in the Prevention of Cancer by Intervention with Selenium (PRECISE) study, a population study involving 40,000 test participants from Denmark, Sweden and England.

Pharma Nord's coenzyme Q10 preparation is the official reference product for the International Coenzyme Q10 Association (ICQA). Pharma Nord actively supports scientific research on the health benefits of coenzyme Q10, primarily in relation to cardiology. Q-Symbio, a large multinational study investigating coenzyme Q10's potential as supplement in the treatment of chronic heart failure was published in the Journal of the American College of Cardiology, HEART FAILURE. The Q-Symbio study randomised 420 patients with severe heart failure (New York Heart Association (NYHA) Class III or IV) to CoQ10 (ubiquinone) or placebo and followed each patient for a period of two years. In the group that received three 100 mg capsules of coenzyme Q10 daily there were 43% fewer heart-related deaths compared with the placebo group. Also, there was a significant reduction in the need for hospitalization among patients in the Q10 group. The product used in the Q-Symbio study was Pharma Nord's 100 mg Q10 in soft-gel capsules (Myoqinon). The preparation is based on ubiquinone, the form of CoQ10 that has been used in scientific research for over 50 years. Unlike ubiquinol (the reduced form of CoQ10), ubiquinone is the oxidized form of CoQ10 and must go through several steps by the body to convert it into the active ubiquinol.

== See also ==
- List of Danish companies
- List of pharmaceutical companies
