= LastObject =

Danish sustainable products manufacturer

LastObject ApS
- Company type: Private
- Industry: Personal care, health and beauty
- Founded: August 1, 2016; 8 years ago in Copenhagen, Denmark
- Founders: Isabel Aagaard, Nicolas Aagaard, Kåre Frandsen
- Headquarters: Copenhagen, Denmark
- Area served: World
- Key people: Kristian Pitzner-Jørgensen (CEO)
- Products: Reusable alternatives to cotton swabs, tissue paper, protective masks
- Net income: ▲1,619,895 kr. (2019)
- Total assets: ▲2,793,064 kr. (2019)
- Website: lastobject.com

LastObject is a Danish manufacturing company, based in Copenhagen that sells sustainable products online and in retail globally. Having been launched in 2016, it launches new products through crowdfunding campaigns on Kickstarter and Indiegogo. The company is best known for producing LastSwab, a reusable cotton swab.

== History ==
LastObject was established in 2016 in Copenhagen by Isabel Aagaard, her brother Nicolas Aagaard, and Kåre Frandsen. Aagaards come from the family that owns Danish jewelry company Troldekugler, known for Trollbeads collection.

Isabel Aagaard and her partners researched ocean pollutants and realised that cotton swabs were one of the most significant. In 2018, they came up with a reusable cotton swab named LastSwab. It was launched in April 2019, and in May the company started a crowdfunding campaign on Kickstarter. LastObject raised over $700,000 from more than 19,000 backers. It then raised more than 1 million euro from over 30,000 backers on Indiegogo.

In January 2020, the firm started crowdfunding campaigns for LastTissue, a reusable handkerchiefs. In September 2020, the company launched LastRound, recyclable cotton pads, on Kickstarter. In February 2020, Isabel Aagaard pitched this project to investors on the Danish TV show Løvens Hule ("Lions' Den"), but rejected the offer.

In October 2020, the firm introduced LastMask kit to help fight COVID-19 waste. Also in October the firm’s LastSwab product was selected for the Beazley Designs of the Year exhibition at Design Museum (London). In November, the brand partnered with the Plastic Bank, a Canadian for-profit social enterprise that builds recycling ecosystems in under-developed communities, taking part in Green November initiative. In April 2021, the company received 6 million krones ($980,000) in seed funding from the Danish Green Investment Fund (Danmarks Grønne Investeringsfond).

== Products ==
As of January 2021, the company had 4 products: LastSwab (reusable cotton swab), LastTissue (reusable tissue), LastRound (facial pads), and LastMask (face mask & spray kit). It is best known for producing LastSwab, which gained increased media attention in October 2020, when the British Department for Environment, Food and Rural Affairs banned single-use plastic straws, cotton buds and stirrers.

== Copyright infringement issues ==
Over the years LastObject filed multiple cases of trademark infringement against third-party copies of their products. According to the Danish Patent and Trademark Office, as of December 2020, the firm was successful in having copies removed from more than 8,000 websites.
