= Trouble light =

Type of lamp

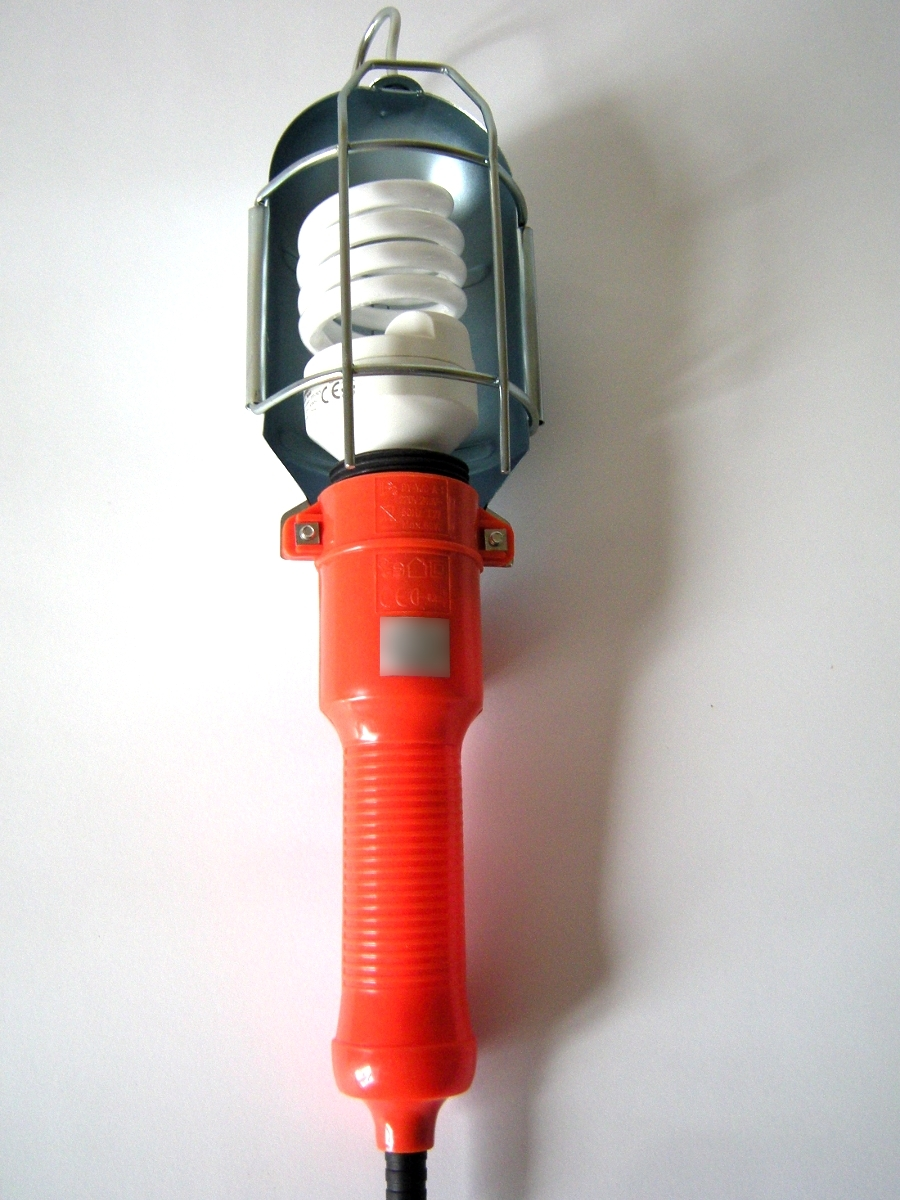
A trouble light using a compact fluorescent lamp. From top to bottom are a hook, a cage, the switch and a handle in one molding

A trouble light, also known as a rough service light, drop light, or inspection lamp, is a special lamp used to illuminate obscure places and able to handle moderate abuse. The light bulb is housed in a protective cage and a handle that are molded to form a single unit. It has a long power line for distant reaching; the handle may also have an electrical outlet on it, allowing the light to also double as an extension cord.

Trouble lights are usually powered by AC wall current, but some are powered by a 12-volt source, such as a car battery. The bulb of the trouble light typically has a heavy filament to withstand dropping, and therefore is also referred to as a drop light. Newer models often use LED arrays as the light source. LEDs are more energy efficient, and may be more durable compared to incandescent lights.

Some trouble lights are also designed to operate on 32 VAC supplied from either a local or centralised transformer, the local one being a plug pack or inline style transformer, and the centralised transformer usually being mounted near the building switchboard and distributed to various special 32 V outlets in work areas to power multiple lights. This is to maximise electrical safety, especially in wet environments or where the cord may be damaged during use and otherwise pose a shock hazard. This was common in Australian mechanical workshops before the advent of battery powered work lights, with the 32 V socket being a non polarised Type A socket or polarised "T" socket to differentiate the 32 V transformer supply from the normal Aus/NZ 240 V mains supply sockets which are Type I.

Trouble lights are intended to be used with "rough service bulbs", a form of incandescent light bulbs which are designed with as many as five support wires holding the filament to allow it to withstand heavy vibrations or movement. Lower voltage bulbs such as those intended to function with 12 volt power supplies also have a higher lumen output per watt of power consumption. Compact fluorescent lamps and recently, light-emitting diodes may also be used in trouble lights.

Trouble lights intended for use in hazardous areas such as in petrochemical plants will have features designed to prevent ignition of flammable gas around the lamp, such as heavy sealed lamp enclosures and guards to protect lamps from breaking.

== Applications ==
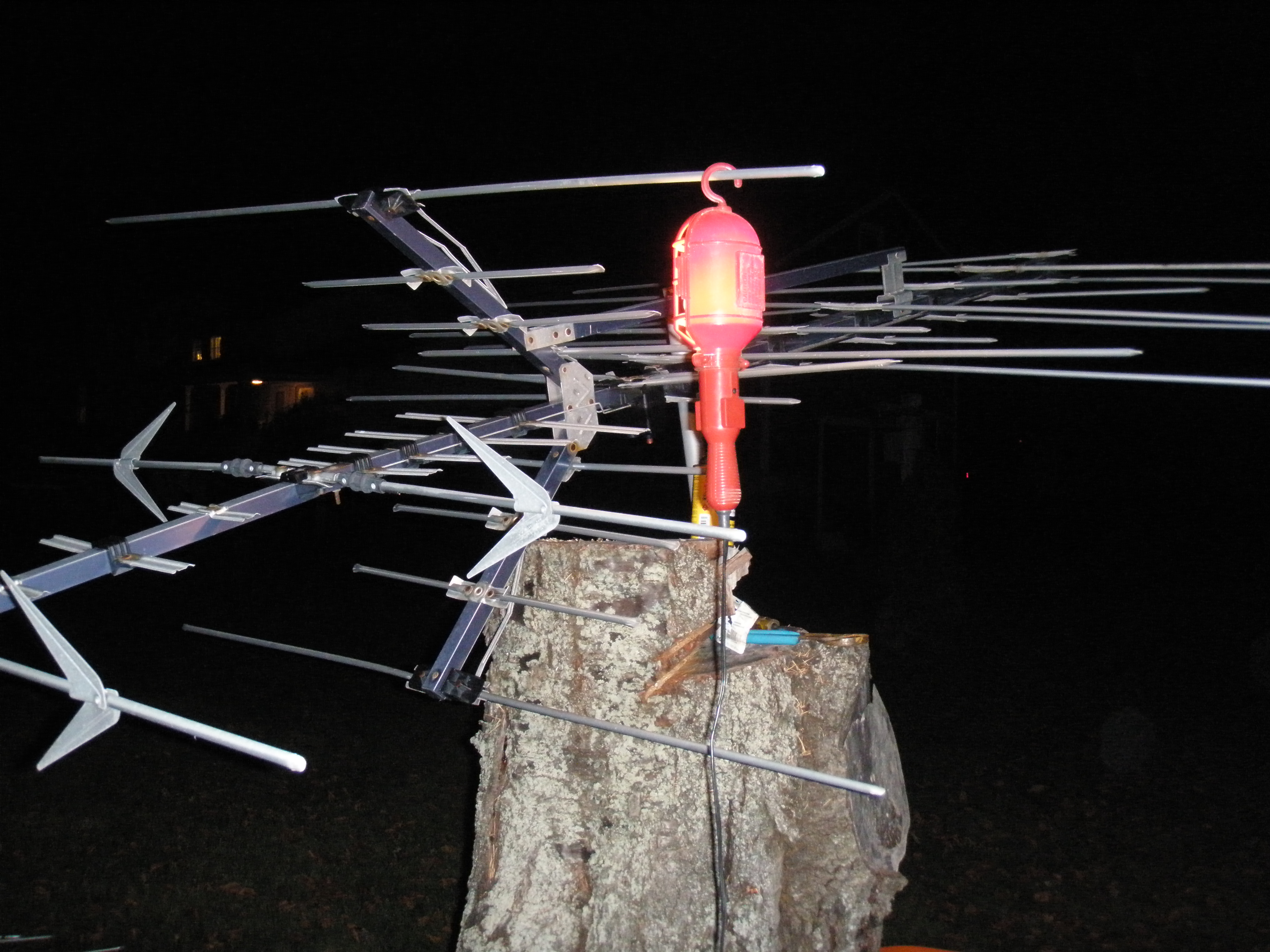
A trouble light hung temporarily on a television antenna

Trouble lights are often used by automotive mechanics and electricians where localized light is needed where ambient light proves to be insufficient.
