= United Shipping & Trading Company =

Danish shipping company

- Type: Privately held
- Industry: Shipping
- Founded: 1876
- Headquarters: Middelfart, Denmark
- Area served: Worldwide
- Key people: Torben Østergaard-Nielsen (Chairman of the Board, founder)
- Revenue: 118,5 billion DKK (2021/22)
- Total equity: 4.3 billion DKK (2021/22)
- Owner: Torben Østergaard-Nielsen and his two daughters, Nina Østergaard Borris and Mia Østergaard Rechnitzer
- Number of employees: 4,000
- Website: ustc.dk

United Shipping & Trading Company (USTC) is a family-owned global group of companies headquartered in Middelfart, Denmark. USTC holds a portfolio of activities that includes oil & energy, shipping & logistics, ship owning, risk management, car activities, IT, sustainable energy, and environment & recycling. The USTC Group is represented by more than 140 own offices in 40 countries and has more than 4,000 employees (2022). The largest company in the group is Bunker Holding, the world's leading company in bunker trading and the parent company of several autonomous bunker fuel companies around the world. Other USTC companies are SDK FREJA, Uni-Tankers, Selected Car Group, Unit IT and CM Biomass, among others.

USTC Group holds a turnover of 118.5 billion DKK and an equity of 4.3 billion DKK (2021/22). The group is owned by Torben Østergaard-Nielsen and his two daughters, Nina Østergaard Borris and Mia Østergaard Rechnitzer (the first financial step in the planned succession process was implemented in June 2020).

== History ==
United Shipping & Trading Company was founded as Julius Mortensen Shipping in Fredericia in 1876. In 1974, the company acquired the local shipbroker H. Sommer in Middelfart. In 1978, Torben Østergaard-Nielsen, was appointed as new Managing Director of H. Sommer's Eftf. Shipping ApS and under his leadership the company diversified into bunker trading.

In 1981, Østergaard-Nielsen embarked on a process which has led to the transfer of bunker activities to independent subsidiaries around the world, now the backbone of Bunker Holding A/S.

In 1998, Torben Østergaard-Nielsen became sole owner of the USTC Group.

In 2013, USTC moved to its present head office, a fully restored turbine hall at Turbinevej in Middelfart.

In 2020, Torben Østergaard-Nielsen's two daughters became co-owners of the group. Nina Østergaard Borris and Mia Østergaard Rechnitzer each received a 1/3 of the ownership of Selfinvest, the USTC Group's parent company.

In 2022, a change in leadership took place, as Nina Østergaard Borris takes over as CEO of the USTC Group after her father, Mia Østergaard Rechnitzer assumes the role as Chief Governance Officer, and Torben Østergaard-Nielsen steps up as working Chairman of the Board of the USTC Group.

== Business units ==
- Bunker Holding A/S – the largest company in the group with 66 offices in 34 countries (2022)
- Uni-Tankers A/S – founded in 1989 and since 1995 operating in its current form
- SDK FREJA A/S – the group's shipping and logistics unit with roots that can be traced back to 1876
- Unit IT A/S – founded in 2003 as Outforce and merged with MindZet and it-Craft in 2019 as Unit IT
- Global Risk Management – founded in 2004
- CM Biomass Partners A/S – sustainable energy, founded in 2009. USTC became majority owner in September 2021
