= Active labour market policies =

Government work relief programmes

Active labour market policies (ALMPs) are government programmes that intervene in the labour market to help the unemployed find work, but also for the underemployed and employees looking for better jobs. In contrast, passive labour market policies involve expenditures on unemployment benefits and early retirement. Historically, labour market policies have developed in response to both market failures and socially/politically unacceptable outcomes within the labor market. Labour market issues include, for instance, the imbalance between labour supply and demand, inadequate income support, shortages of skilled workers, or discrimination against disadvantaged workers.

Many of these programmes grew out of earlier public works projects, in the United States particularly those implemented under the New Deal, designed to combat widespread unemployment in the developed world during the interwar period. Today, academic analysis of ALMPs is associated with economists such as Lars Calmfors and Richard Layard. ALMPs have traditionally been considered “supply-side measures” because they consisted of different employment programs and job placement policies and were designed to assist the most marginalised groups in the labour market. In more recent times, ALMPs have shifted towards a “demand-side” focus by involving employers in various initiatives aimed at offering employment opportunities to those who are disadvantaged in the labour market.

Active labour market policies are prominent in the economic policy of the Scandinavian countries, although over the 1990s they grew in popularity across Europe as several policy plans were created with the aim of enhancing long-lasting labor market performance. Notable examples include the New Deal in the UK and many welfare-to-work programmes in the US.

== Origins of ALMPs ==
Three distinct periods can be observed in the evolution of ALMPs in OECD countries, with each emphasising different types of policies. Initially, during the 1950s and 1960s, active policies were developed by countries facing labour shortages to ensure a workforce with the necessary skills for expanding industrial economies. During this period, the primary policy objective was upskilling. The second period followed the oil crisis of 1973 to 1974 when ALMPs faced a much more challenging environment, marked by persistently high unemployment rates. As a result, in many countries, the primary function of ALMPs shifted towards job placement. Finally, since the mid-1990s, labour-market policies have primarily focused on encouraging and facilitating the re-entry of unemployed individuals and non-working individuals back into the labour market through a combination of incentive reinforcement and employment assistance programs.

The first active labour market policy measures date back to 1951 with the creation of the Rehn-Meidner model in Sweden developed by two economists from the social democratic trade union movement to modernise post-war Swedish industry and enhance productivity by combining a unified wage policy of solidarity which, as it progressed centrally, eliminated the least competitive industries among the country while offering a substantial retraining package to the workers thus laid off so that they could join the more modern and efficient industries. Despite its origins as a social-democratic policy, the concept of ALMP has gained acceptance among politicians across the ideological spectrum, including liberals, conservatives, and liberal economists.

The Rehn-Meiner model was a distinct aspect of Sweden's economic history and was not replicated elsewhere. Nonetheless, the concept of implementing ALMPs in a rapidly modernising economy experiencing labour shortages was attractive in other regions as well. However, the methods employed varied, as they were dependent on the starting point of each country.

Attempts at active labour market policies were also made in Italy in the 1950s. The issue of unemployment in Italy differed from that of other countries - it was not due to declining industries, but rather a surplus of labour in the southern region of the country. During the 1950s and 1960s, Italy experienced a strong economic growth period known as the “Italian economic miracle”, but still faced a labour shortage in the north. At the same time, the southern region remained a significant source of labour, yet lacked adequate skills. To bridge the gap between skill demand and supply, the country introduced an apprenticeship law in 1955, which offered on-the-job training and lower waged for trainees. However, the program did not gain popularity. Employers were generally not allowed to choose apprentices, and the labour exchange officer assigned them instead. Trade unions also criticised the law for exploiting young workers with low pay.

In 1963, the French government under Gaullist leadership proposed a reform for the unemployment compensation system aimed at facilitating (re-)training for the unemployed. However, this proposal faced strong opposition from trade unions who feared increased state intervention in the management of unemployment insurance (UNEDIC). In France, social security, including unemployment insurance, is managed jointly by social partners - they have traditionally opposed government intervention, viewing it as interference in a “private” institution. The outcome was therefore a watered-down version of the original suggestion.

Germany also adopted a similar approach a few years later with the implementation of the Employment Promotion Act in 1969. The law was enacted during the brief tenure of the first “grand coalition government” in the country's postwar history. The law focused on a new preventive approach to labour-market policy, with an emphasis on aligning workforce skills with technological advancements. This newly adopted law also created the Federal Institute of Labour, which was responsible for a range of services including unemployment compensation, continuing education, retraining, employment services for the disabled, job creation programs, and training.

== Concept of social investment ==
Active labour market policies are based on the concept of social investment, which rests on the idea of basing decision-making on the welfare of society in quantifiable terms, by increasing the employability, incomes and productivity of economic agents, so this approach interprets state expenditure not as consumption but as an investment that will produce returns on the welfare of individuals. The adoption of this concept has thus added to the traditional task of social policy to maintain income levels that of promoting labour market integration by removing barriers to entry through state intervention.

== Program types ==
ALMPs have diverse origins and forms. According to Giulano Bonolli, there are four main categories of ALMPs:

- Incentive reinforcement: refers to measures aimed at increasing the work incentives of social benefit recipients. It consists of a negative incentive component which aims to shift people from welfare to work by reducing the amount and duration of passive benefits such as unemployment benefits in order to exert a stimulating pressure and accelerate the job search process. This is an approach particularly applied in liberal Anglo-Saxon countries such as the United States or the United Kingdom and more recently applied in Germany with the Hartz laws of 2003-2005 which considerably weakened the level of social assistance for long-term job seekers. A variant of this category takes the form of in-work benefits, which aim to encourage the acceptance by the recipient of low-wage work in order to eliminate the poverty trap phenomenon, which can lead recipients to prefer to live on social assistance, even if it is low when the difference between the passive and in-work benefit level is not sufficient. Thanks to this additional assistance the market income level is compensated by social transfers.
- Public employment services and administration, (such as job centres and labour exchanges) include job placement activities, counselling and vocational guidance. Public employment services help the unemployed improve their job search effort by disseminating information on vacancies and by providing assistance with interview skills and writing a curriculum vitae. Services such as counselling can be especially beneficial for individuals who have been out of the labour market for an extended period or who have never had a job and may face discrimination from employers. In the case of parents, a barrier to employment may be the absence of proper childcare. These employment services may also include aid in locating and paying for appropriate childcare services.
- Upskilling: This category is based on a human capital investment approach, which aims to adapt workers' skills to labour market requirements through measures that may take the form of state-subsidised classes and apprenticeships helping the unemployed improve their vocational skills as a way to promote access to the labour market for workers with outdated skills or from certain disadvantaged groups such as early school leavers with few qualifications. It is widely applied in the Nordic countries and particularly in Denmark where it forms the core of the flexi security model which focuses on the empowerment of jobseekers by funding extensive training programmes which are accessible or even compulsory after one year of unemployment. The provision of basic education services can also play a role in improving human capital for certain categories such as recently arrived immigrant workers, Germany thus provided in the past few years German language skills courses that concerned 170 000 people, most asylum seekers in 2017 with efforts made to involve them into preparatory traineeship, These measures have had the effect of increasing their productivity, reflected in the fact that immigrants with good German writing skills see their wage gap with natives reduced by 10%
- Employment subsidies, either in the public or private sector, directly create jobs for the unemployed and other priority groups (not including youth and the disabled). These are typically short-term measures which are designed to allow the unemployed to build up work experience and prevent skill atrophy. These subsidies are categorised:
  - hiring subsidies which are paid to private-sector employers to motivate them to hire unemployed persons
  - assistance to unemployed individuals who aspire to start their own business
  - direct job creation for unemployed workers in the public or non-profit sectors.

== The politics of ALMPs ==
A number of authors have argued that countries with stronger left wing political parties and trade unions have more developed ALMP. On the other hand, social democratic parties may not promote ALMP if their constituents are well protected workers and hence face little risk of being unemployed. More recently, the notion that different types of ALMP have similar political determinants has been contested. In the United States and Great Britain, fragmented and under-resourced ALMPs have been attributed as a factor in the rise of populist backlash politics in the Rust Belt and post-industrial northern England during the mid-2010s.

== Levels of implementation ==
Active labour market policies in general are most prevalent in the Nordic countries (with the exception of Norway), notably in Denmark where such expenditure represented almost 2% of GDP in 2017 compared to an OECD average of 0.52% this same year whereas on the contrary, Eastern European countries invest less in these policies. (with the exception of Hungary).

== Effectiveness ==
- To confront the problems that technology, globalization, and demographic change pose to the labor market, having an effective set of active labor market policies is critical. Active Labour Market Policies are a catch-all term for a variety of policies that fall into four major categories: vocational training, job search aid, wage subsidies or public works programs, and support for micro-entrepreneurs or self-employed people. Governments provide considerable fiscal resources to ALMPs (more than 0.5 percent of OECD nations' GDP in the last ten years) in order to reduce unemployment, raise labor income, and encourage the adoption of new technologies that enhance productivity.
- The effectiveness of these policies was examined in a recent research through a systematic examination of more than 100 experimental evaluations that demonstrated the success of ALMPs applied across the world. Focused solely on programs assessed through Randomized Control Trials, taking advantage of the fact that there have been a flurry of RCTs in the last five years that have thrown fresh light on the impact and cost effectiveness of ALMPs. This concentrate on RCTs limits the number of relevant evaluations, but it allows for more attention on estimates with high internal validity and refinement of the metrics used to compare outcomes, resulting in more naturally comparable conclusions from individual evaluations.
- The efficiency of multidimensional and complex policies like ALMPs is determined by how they are conceived, the quality of their execution, the context in which they were created, and the people they are intended to serve. A vocational training program, for example, may vary in cost and duration, curricular content, and whether or not, and how, the private sector participates, and may target a wide range of people, from seasoned software programmers in Tokyo or Chicago to poor youngsters in Madhya Pradesh. An analysis that overlooks these concerns is unlikely to provide policymakers with precise and conclusive insights - there is a lack of agreement on whether ALMPs are effective in decreasing unemployment rates or increasing the number of employed workers, as well as which program types are the most effective.
- When analyzing the overall impact of the four policy clusters studied, it is found that wage subsidies and independent worker support had the largest median influence on earnings, with gains of 16.7% and 16.5 percent, respectively, when compared to the control group. Vocational training programs, on the other hand, have a median impact of 7.7%, while employment services have a minimal influence. The median impact on employment follows a similar trend, with wage subsidies having the biggest influence on this outcome category, followed by independent worker aid and vocational training with median impacts of 11 percent and 6.7 percent, respectively. Surprisingly, employment services interventions had a median impact of 2.6 percent, which is consistent with short-term and low-cost interventions that aim to boost the inclination to obtain work rather than to build human capital. Importantly, the claimed effects on incomes and employment outcomes are quite variable.
- When the data is available, a continuous variable is included to identify the intervention's average cost per person in 2010 Purchasing Power Parity (PPP) dollars. Only 51 interventions recorded this essential variable, and only 22 conducted a thorough cost-benefit analysis using net present value, internal rate of return, or payback periods, indicating a significant flaw in the impact evaluation literature's standard practice. Despite the small number of ALMPs for which cost data is available, several trends may be discerned. Wage subsidies, assistance for self-employed or micro-entrepreneurs, and vocational trainings all have similar median costs per participant, ranging between 1,744 and 1,518 2010 PPP US dollars, with the second category having substantially more fluctuation. Employment services, on the other hand, are far less expensive policies, with a median cost per participant of 277 US dollars in 2010 PPP values and no variation between programs.

== Active labour market policies in Europe ==
Active Labour Market Policies represent a critical component of The European Employment Strategy (EES), which recognises employment as a primary objective of a joint economic policy. The main categories of ALMPs in European countries are training programs, private sector incentive schemes, direct employment programs, and Services and Sanctions (a category that includes all measured focuses on enhancing job search effectiveness, such as counselling, monitoring or job search aid). Numerous active labour market programs in European countries are tailored to address the needs of young job seekers (aged 25 and below) who are unemployed. Additionally, several countries have active labour market programs designed for individuals with disabilities.

Training programs are the most common active labour market measure implemented in Europe. However, the assessment of their effectiveness has shown mixed results. In some cases, treatment effect estimates are negative, while in others, they are insignificant or show modestly positive results. Nevertheless, there are indications that training programs increase post-treatment employment probabilities, especially for participants with better labour market prospects and for women.

In the recent years, job guarantee programs have received renewed attention. Job guarantee trials have started in European countries and delivered first promising results. European institutions and international organizations have called for increased funding to expand regional employment guarantee pilots.

== Active labor market policies in United Kingdom ==
The United Kingdom has adopted progressive Active Labor market Policies (ALMPs), which can be broadly classified into three categories, including employment subsidies and direct job creation programs, vocational training and education programs, and job search assistance and counseling. While these policies focus on helping job-seekers find employment on their own, they also provide the necessary support and incentives to facilitate their reintegration into the labor market. This combination of active and passive policies is influenced by a range of economic, social, and political factors. The United Kingdom has historically had a liberal economic model, with relatively low levels of regulation and social protection. This has led to a focus on market-based solutions to labor market problems, including the use of ALMPs to create employment opportunities. In the recent times, the Job retention scheme was introduced in 2020 due to the COVID-19 pandemic, to prevent layoffs. The UK's ALMP's policies can be classified more as employment policies, as they primarily focus on creating job opportunities while still enabling the workers to find employment own. The existing configuration of active and passive labor market policies in the country is a result of the country's liberal economic model, recent experience of high unemployment rates, and highly competitive labor market.

== Active labour market policies in the Czech republic ==
- After three years of negative economic development, the Czech economy began to pick up speed, with GDP growth rates of 0.6 and 2.7 percent in 1993 and 1994, respectively. What's notable is that, notwithstanding the return to growth in 1993, the recorded unemployment rate stayed around the same low level from 1992 to 1994. However, as compared to the rates in 1993 and 1994, the average outflow rate was quite high in 1992, when the economy was still in decline.
- This might be because the budget for active labor market policies (ALMPs) in 1992 was very large compared to prior years.
- ALMPs have reduced the number of people who have been jobless for a long time, such as women, Romanies, the disabled, the less educated, and those who have previously been unemployed. Furthermore, the ALMPs aided those who were getting unemployment benefits more than people who were not receiving unemployment benefits. This data is noteworthy because it supports the premise that district labor offices were driven to cut program expenditures.

== See also ==
- Active Labor Market Policies in Denmark
- Earned income tax credit
- Job guarantee
- Mixed economy
- Social protection#Labor market Interventions
- Trade Adjustment Assistance
- Welfare capitalism
