= Ryesgade =

Street in Copenhagen

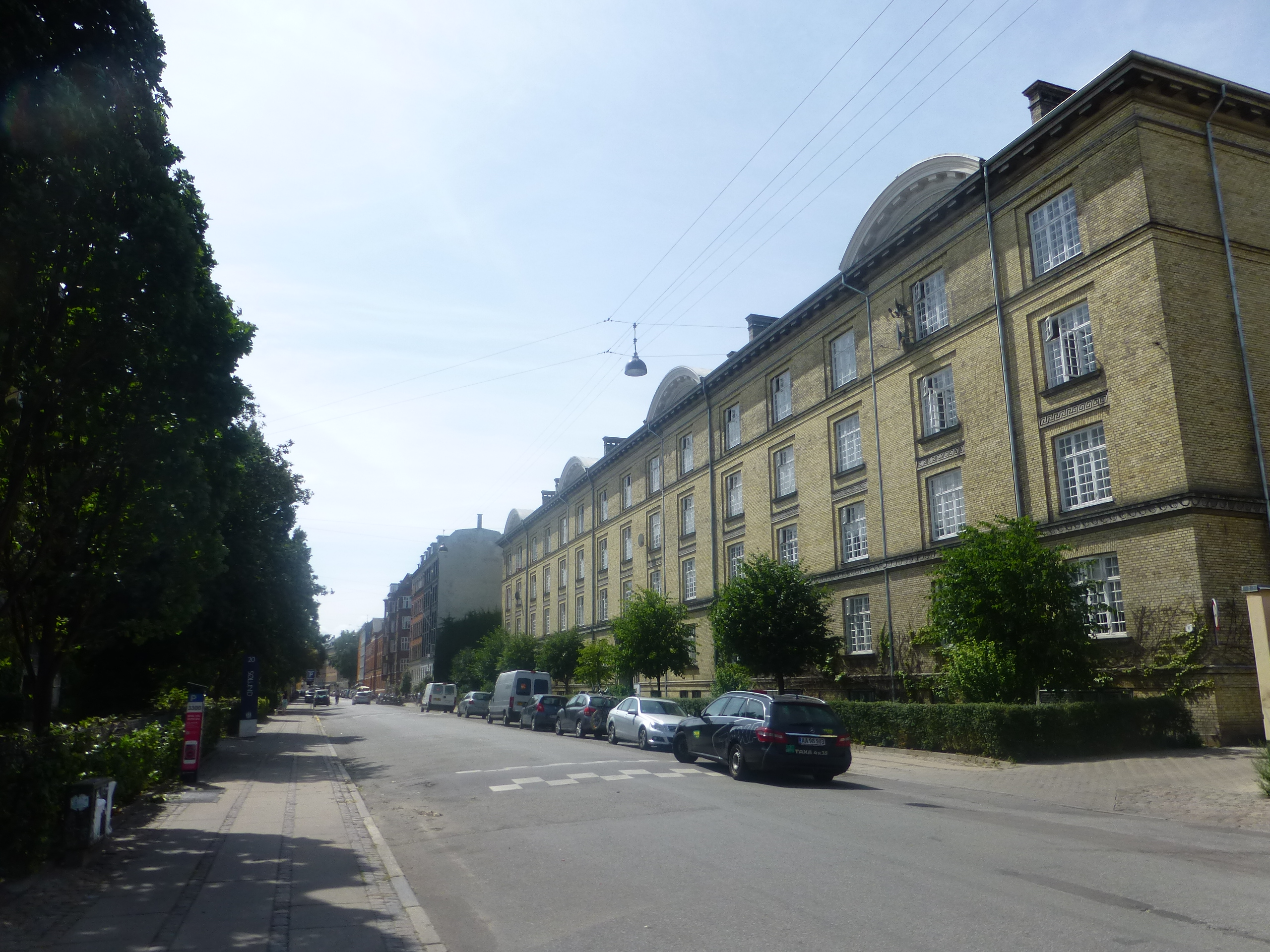
- Length: 1,360 m (4,460 ft)
- Location: Copenhagen, Denmark
- Quarter: Nørrebro, Østerbro
- Postal code: 2100, 2200
- Nearest metro station: Trianglen
- Coordinates: 55°41′31.38″N 12°34′1.14″E
- Southwest end: Ravnsborggade
- Major junctions: Fredensgade
- Northeast end: Østerbrogade

Ryesgade is a street straddling the border of the Nørrebro and Østerbro districts of Copenhagen, Denmark. Together with Ravnsborggade, its continuation to the south, it forms the backbone of a small neighbourhood bounded by The Lakes to the east, Blegdamsvej to the west, Nørrebrogade to the south and Østerbrogade to the north. The busy artery Fredensgade and the adjacent Fredens Park, effectively separates the Nørrebro and Østerbro portions of Ryesgade from each other. Ryesgade was formerly known for its many second-hand stores of which a few still exist today.

== History ==
=== Planning and street names ===
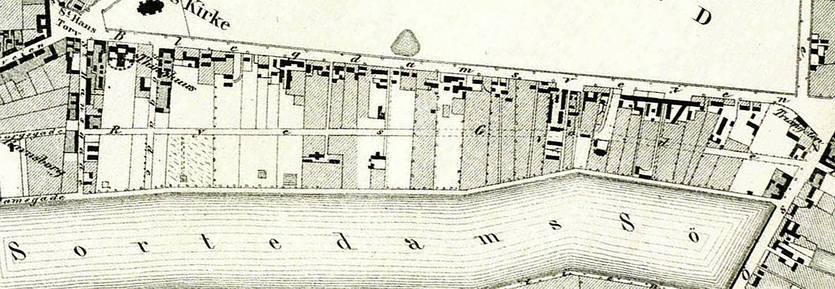
An 1860 rendering of the planned street

The area between Sortedam Lake and Blegdamsvej was formerly the site of a row of narrow lots with bleaching pongs. The plans for the new street was first presented in around 1860 as part of the plans for redevelopment of the area. It served the dual purpose of dividing the long lots in two and in the same time to facilitate the construction of a new main sewer along the lakes.

The street and its side streets were named for military figures from Denmark's most recent wars, First Schleswig War (1849–50) and Second Schleswig War (1864). Ryesgade takes its name after Olaf Rye. The side streets are named after Hans Hedemann (Hedemannsgade), Hans Hedemann (Helgesensgade), Niels Christian Lunding (Lundingsgade), Johan Trepka (Trepkasgade), Johan Irminger (Irmingersgade), Christoph von Krogh (Kroghsgade, (Frederik Læssøe (Læssøesgade) and Frederik Adolph Schleppegrell (Schleppegrellsgade).

=== Early development, 1860-1900 ===
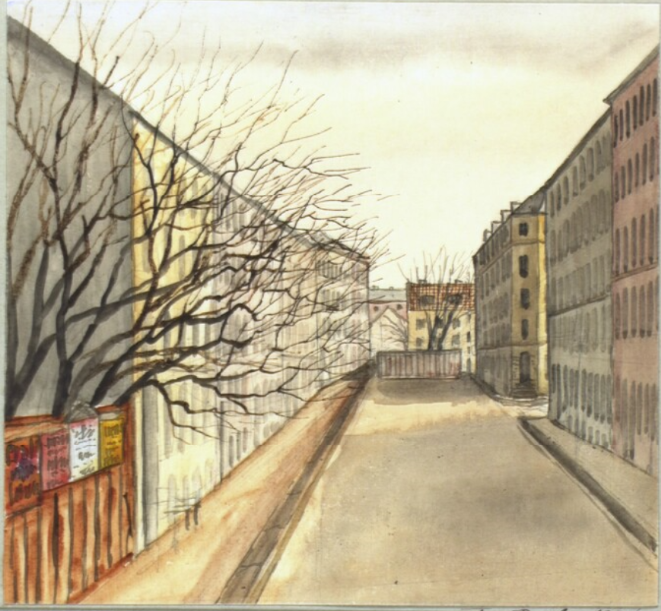
The southern cul-de-sac seen from Nørrebrogade on a drawing by Lydvig Both, 1994

The street was constructed in stages with its last section, around Irmingersgade, not being constructed until the 1880s. For many years it was therefore made up of two dead end sections, accessed from the south and north respectively.

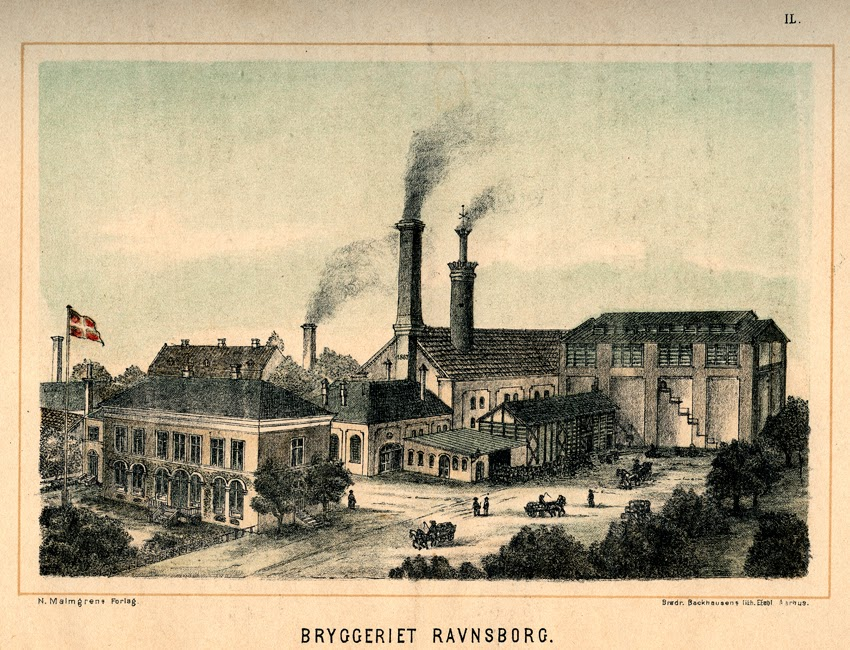
Ravnsborg Brewery

The first development along the street was a mixture of industrial and residential buildings. Harald Drewsen designed a villa for Andreas Aagesen at No. 46. Goldschmidt & Nordholm's textile dyeing plant was located at No. 23. Ravnsborg Brewery (No. 27) was established in 1867 by the brewers F. C. Madsen and J. Vestberg. Nørrebros Iisværk, an industrial producer of ice, was located at No. 50. Camillus Nyrop's factory (No. 105) producedmedical instruments. Schulstad & Ludvigsen operated an industrial bakery in the street. Nordiske Kabel- og Traadfabrikker opened at No. 105 in 1893 but moved to La Cours Cej in Frederiksberg in 1906.

The entertainment venue Sortedamslund was also located in the street.

=== 20th century ===
On 1 June 1983 squatters moved into No. 58. No. 63–65 was also squatted on 4 December 1985 and cleared by the police on 11 February 1986. The situation culminated in the Ryesgade Riots which occurred in mid-September. The squatters ultimately left No. 58 on 22 September.

== Notable buildings and residents ==
=== Ravnsborggade to Fredensgade ===
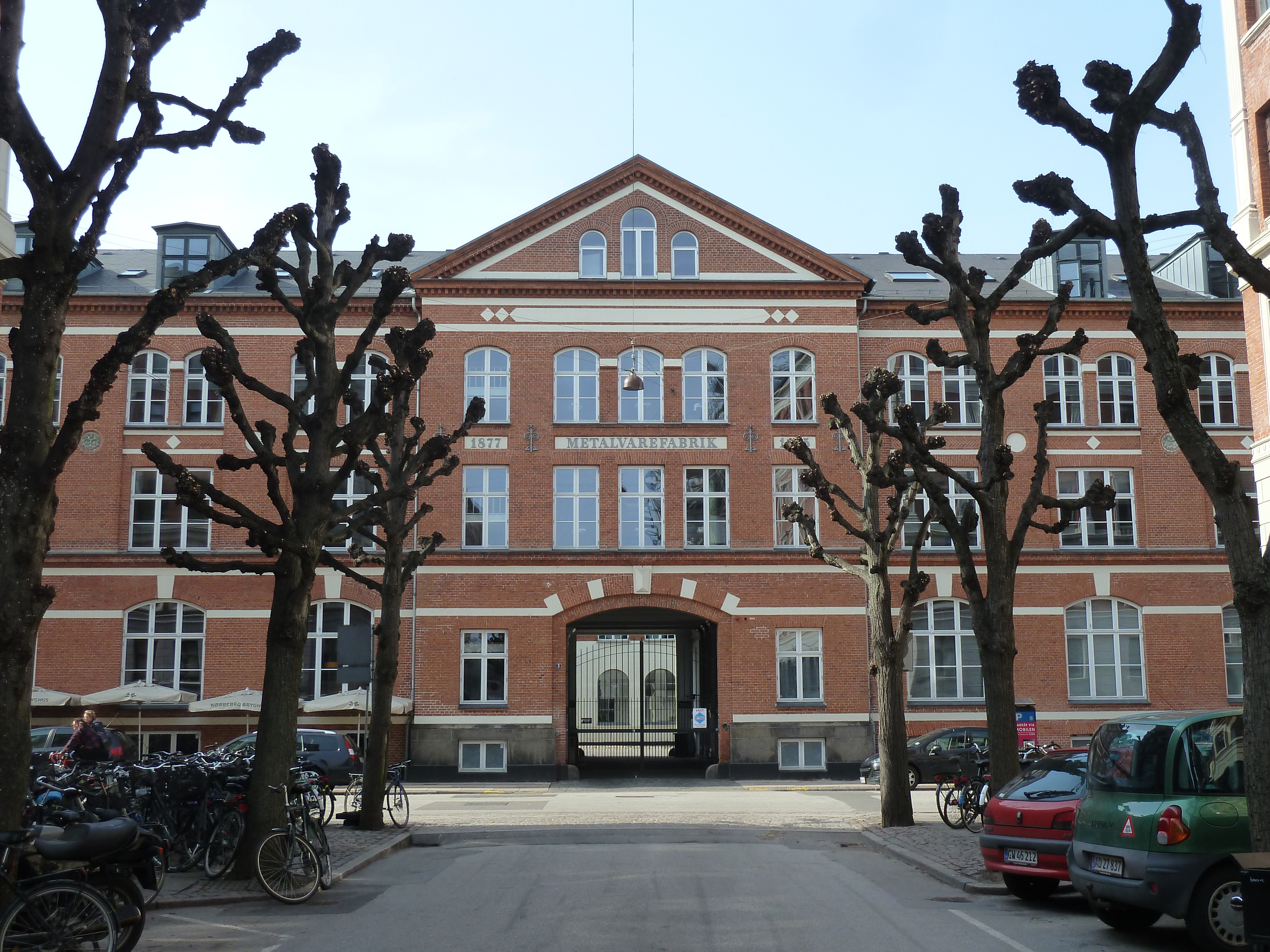
No. 3: The former metal goods factory

A number of the old industrial buildings are still found in the Nørrebro section of the street. No. 3 is a former metal goods factory, Nordisk Metalvarefabrik. The main wing on Ryesgade was originally a social institution, built in 1852 to a design by Niels Sigfred Nebelong. The wing on Sankt Hans Gade and a number of smaller stable and storage buildings were added in 1971. In 1895 the complex was taken over by the metal goods factory which remained on the site until the 1940s. The building is now owned by C. W. Obel and houses creative businesses as well as Nørrebro Bryghus. No. 48 is a former starch factory. No. 51–55 is a former machine factory, Nielsen & Winther, built in 1916 to a design by Frederik Wagner.

No. 15-17 are the last surviving buildings of Sankt Johannes Stiftelse. It was built in around 1885 and served as a combination of a hospital, workhouse and orphanage. It was later merged with Almindelig Hospital under the name Nørre Hospital. Most of the buildings have been demolished and replaced by the senior citizens home Sølund on the other side of the street.

Goldschmidts stiftelse (No. 31) was built by Benny Goldschmidt to provide affordable housing for dyers.

=== Fredensgade to Østerbrogade ===
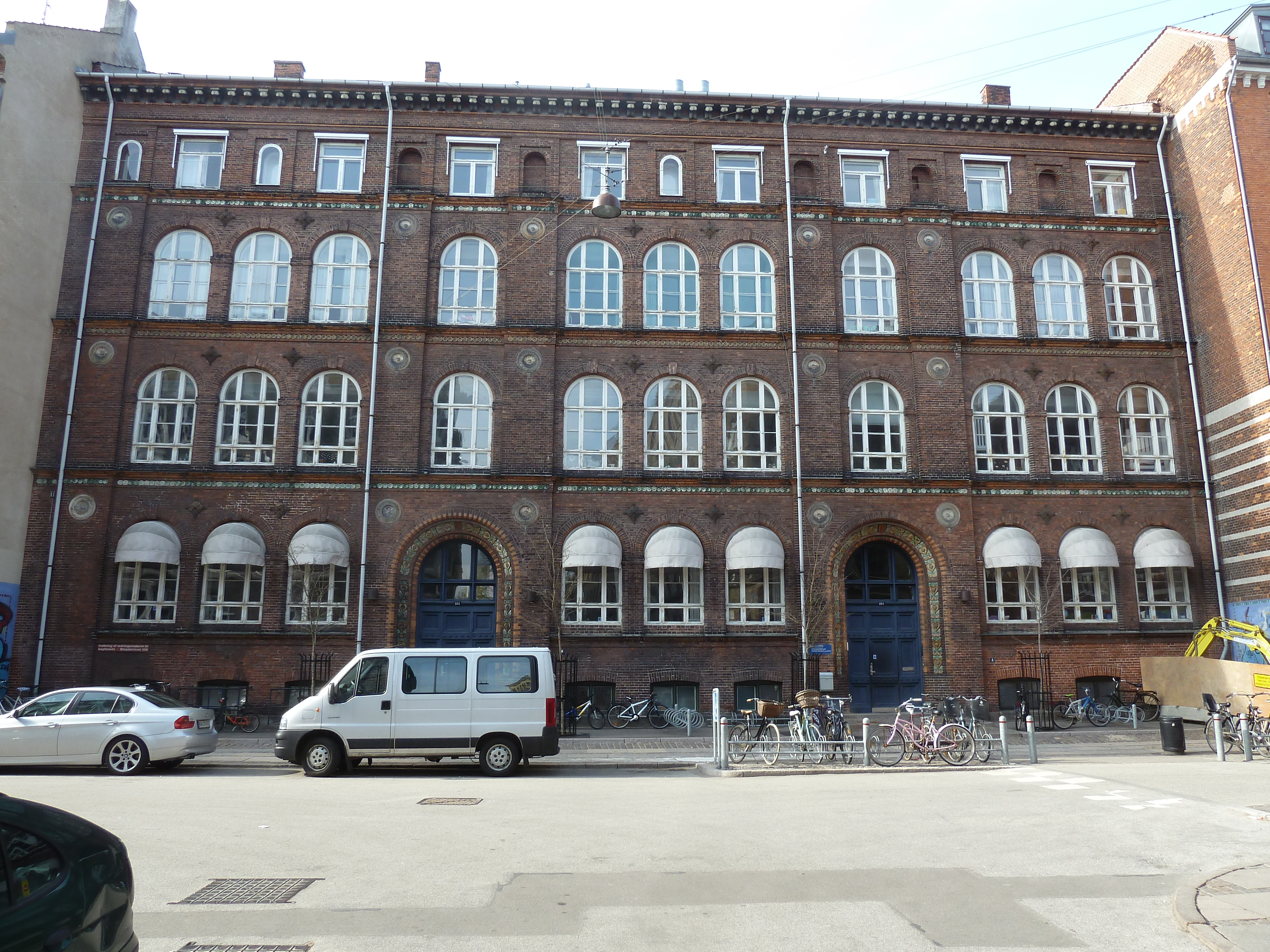
The former Ryesgade School

Sortedam School is located at No. 120. No. 101 is the former Ryesgade School, which was completed in 1891 to a design by Hans Jørgen Holm . On the opposite side of the street, at No. 104, is the rear side of Soldenfeldts Stiftelse, a home for elderly women. The front of the building faces Sortedams Doseringen.

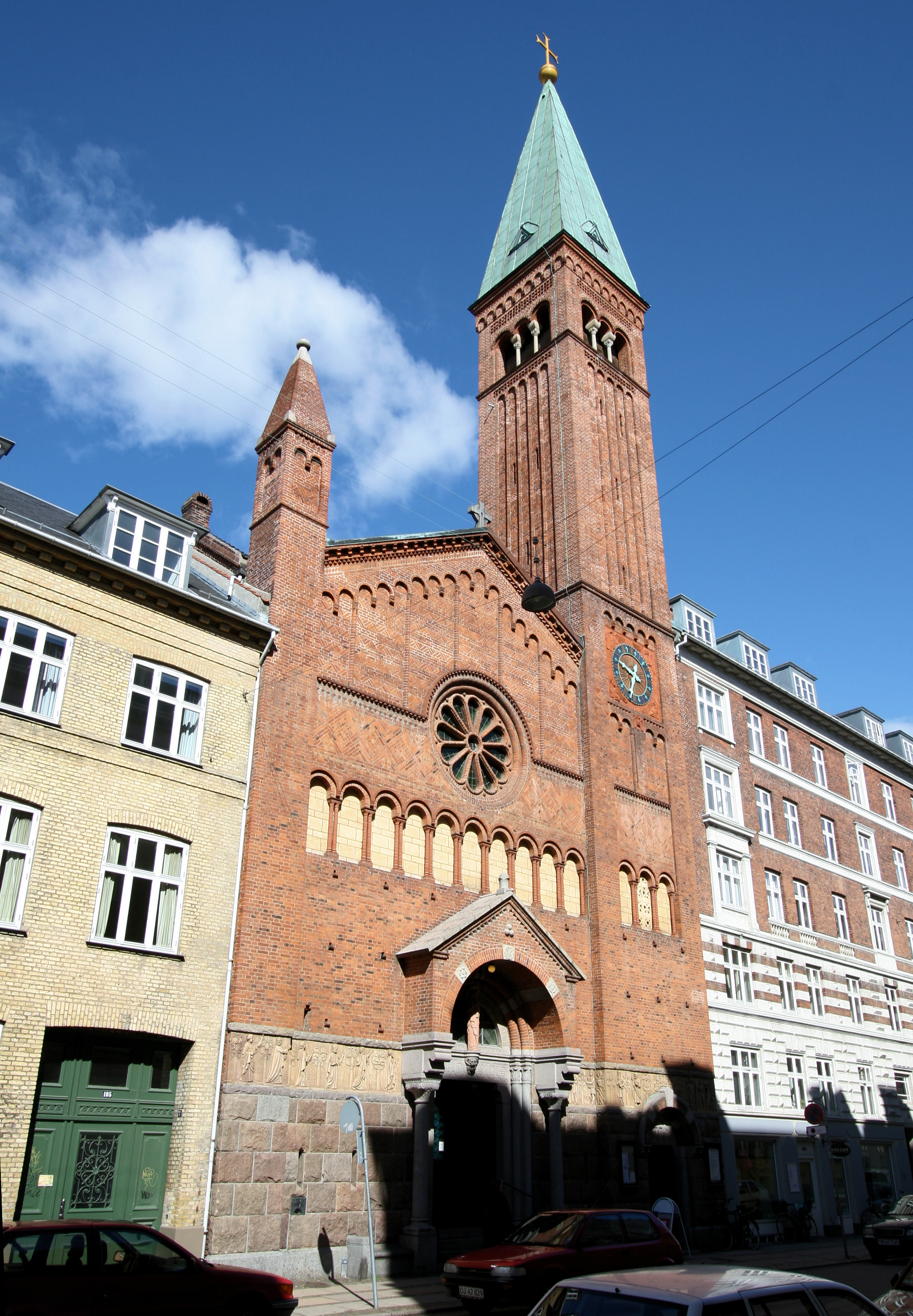
Nazareth Church

There are two churches in the street. Church of Peace was built in 1899, although the tower was not added until 1906. Nazareth Church at No. 106B was built between 102 and 104 to a design by Victor Nyebølle. In 2013, Church of Peace was one of 14 churches in Copenhagen which was nominated for closure by the Bishop of Copenhagen.

Fotografernes Stiftelse (No. 100) was built by the Danish Association of Photographers to provide affordable housing for indigent photographers.

== Memorial plaque ==
On the corner of Irmingergade, there is a plaque commemorating Svend Rothenberg Frederiksen, a member of the Danish resistance movement, who was shot at the site on 2 May 1945.

== In popular culture ==
The street is used as a location in the 1971 film The Missing Clerk.

== See also ==
- Ravnsborggade
