= Battle of Ryesgade =

1986 series of street fights in Ryesgade, Copenhagen, Denmark

Coordinates: 55°41′39.3″N 12°34′12.69″E

- Date: 14-23 September 1986
- Location: Ryesgade, Copenhagen
- Caused by: Eviction notice
- Goals: Continued occupation of Ryesgade 58
- Methods: Demonstrations, Barricades
- Result: Squatters evacuate

Parties
Squatters	City Hall: Social Democrats; Police

Lead figures
No centralized leadership	Egon Weidekamp

The Battle of Ryesgade was a nine-day series of street fights in mid-September 1986, in the Copenhagen street Ryesgade. It was the most violent event in a long-standing conflict between the Copenhagen City Council and the city's community of squatters. Faced with an ultimatum to leave their illegally occupied housing or face eviction, the squatters instead fortified the streets around their building so strongly that it became a cop-free zone. They took advantage of this lack of control by burning down a building belonging to the Sperry Corporation. For nine days, massed police unsuccessfully attempted to evict the squatters. The civil disorder was of a magnitude never before seen in Denmark. After communicating a manifesto through the media, the defenders finally abandoned the squat and dispersed without being apprehended.

== Background ==
Throughout the 1980s, the Copenhagen City Council and property owners came into conflict, both violent and ideological, with squatters. At this time, the squatters in Denmark had organized into an active and well-funded movement with left-wing overtones. It started in Copenhagen, where a group of young people began to take over empty buildings, using them for free housing and as alternative cultural and community centers. The youngsters were made up of a mixture of punks, left-wing activists, and unemployed teenagers, mostly from the working-class area of Nørrebro.

The economic situation in Denmark was one of high unemployment and poor housing, especially in Copenhagen. In the 1970s, the Copenhagen City Council, led by a Social Democratic mayor, Egon Weidekamp, had begun a process of rehousing for people living in the poor areas of Copenhagen. The process involved the demolition of large parts of the old boroughs surrounding the city center. Although the intent was to raise the standard of living for working-class people, the consequence was that the new houses often became too expensive for those very people to live in. Many found themselves temporarily relocated to elsewhere in the city, and when they wanted to return to their old homes, they found the rent to be too high for them to pay. This gave rise to a growing anger towards the city council and a feeling amongst the poor people of Copenhagen that decisions concerning their lives were being made without them having anything to say about it. The city's plans also left many old and worn, but still useful, buildings empty. At the same time, a lot of young people were unemployed and without homes. All these factors opened the door to widespread squatting.

== Copenhagen Squatters Movement ==
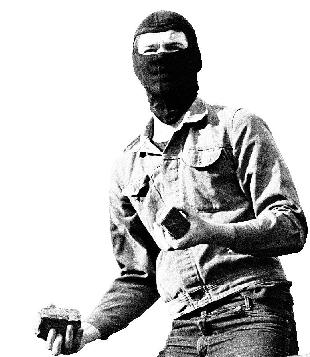
Rather die standing up, than living life on your knees! (Motto of the squatters in Ryesgade)

The Copenhagen Squatters Movement first appeared as a political force when a group of young people moved in and took over an abandoned bread factory in Nørrebro. They demanded that the city council give them a house where the young people of Copenhagen could gather without charge. Furthermore, the house had to be completely self-organized and under the control of the youths, without the city council having any influence on the day-to-day running of the house. The action lasted only two hours before the police moved in and cleared the factory.

Over the next year or so the squatters multiplied, as did the tensions between them and the authorities. On March 6, 1982 the first seriously violent confrontation between squatters and police took place. Earlier that day, about 90 people had illegally occupied an old building. When the police moved in for the eviction, several of the squatters were wearing bandannas and ski masks to hide their faces. The police tried to break down the door, but their first assault was forced back by a bombardment of bricks and other building materials. They regrouped and brought in an armored car and industrial saw. When they did manage to get inside the building, they severely beat several of their opponents.

This event marked a turning point in the conflict. Where the evictions of other squats had been relatively peaceful, this was the first time that the squatters had actually attacked the police. During the first attack a toilet was thrown at the police. This act later became famous as a symbol of the end of the squatters' peaceful resistance against evictions.

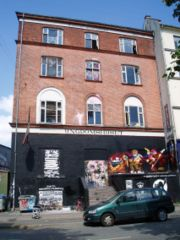
Ungdomshuset.Jagtvej 69. 1982/2007

After the confrontation in March, the squatters gained significant advances. They established many new squats in the spring and summer of 1982. The squats were mostly located in Nørrebro, and unlike before, the police did not move in and evict the squatters right away. This allowed the squatters to establish collectives. The houses included such now-infamous sites as Allotria, Bazooka, Den Lille Fjer ("The Little Feather"), Garternergade 14 ("Gardener Street 14"), Snehvide ("Snow White"), Safari, and many more. Allotria in particular became a popular place for alternative music. In Bazooka, the squatters even set up a housing service with records of empty houses and flats in the area. Those in need of a place to live could come to Bazooka. They were shown an empty house and offered a crowbar with which to break down the door.

As these types of activities grew, they drew more and more people into squatting. At this time, the squatters experienced great support from the people in the local community, many of whom saw the squatters as fighting for a noble cause. The squatters also took a harder line in their attitude toward the authorities. In the fall of 1982, a series of confrontations took place. Most famous of these was Endagskrigen ("The One-Day War") where the squatters violently resisted an eviction. This confrontation was the most violent street fight yet. The squatters set up improvised barricades in the streets and pelted police with building materials taken from nearby construction sites, Molotov cocktails, and stones.

In October 1982, the council caved to the squatters' original demands and handed over an old building for their use. The building was named Ungdomshuset ('the Youth House') and was located on Jagtvej 69 in Nørrebro. (The house was finally evicted on March 1, 2007, after the city council sold the building to a Christian sect.) With this gesture, the city council hoped that the squatters would abandon the other squatted houses and settle for the new building on Jagtvej 69. This did not happen. As a result, the city council and the mayor launched a wave of evictions against the squatters.

In January 1983 the police evicted Allotria. A force of about 1500 policemen had been mobilized, and the squatters realized that they stood no chance against such numbers. When the police entered the house, the squatters had already escaped through a tunnel dug under the street. The tunnel was seen by the media and the public as a creative stroke of genius. The police were ridiculed in the papers, and the general public saw it as victory for the squatters. The squatters did not see it that way. To them, the loss of their homes was at best bittersweet. Over the next couple of days the massive police force evicted the rest of the squats in Nørrebro. Bulldozers then moved in and demolished the houses.

== Ryesgade 58 ==
In 1983, a group of squatters moved in and took control of an empty house in Ryesgade 58. The squatters, many of them very experienced, moved in slowly and in small groups to avoid detection. The plan succeeded, and after a couple of months, they had established a well-organized squat. It was designed so that every floor was an independent collective charged with maintaining its part of the house. They improved the living conditions in the house, and Ryesgade 58 soon became the unofficial headquarters of the squatters movement. It was the center for political activities and was usually the place where foreign squatters lived when visiting Copenhagen. Soon after the squatting of Ryesgade 58, other new squats were established around Copenhagen. These squats included Kapaw in Østerbro, Baldersgade 20 ("Baldurs Street 20"), Bauhaus, and the infamous Sorte Hest ("Black Horse").

== Conflict with the owners and the city council ==
In 1984 the squatters began negotiating with UNGBO, the owner of the Ryesgade house. UNGBO was originally created by the National Association of City Councils to tackle the problems with youth housing in the major cities of Denmark. The squatters demanded that UNGBO and the city council gave Rysegade 58 the status of autonomous housing. This involved the city council allowing the house to remain under the control of the occupants and that the squatters would be free to organize without interference. After nearly two years of negotiation, a compromise was reached that would have given the residents full control over the house as an officially recognized social experiment.

However, since UNGBO was under the control of the city council, the agreement between the squatters and UNGBO required its approval. In June 1986, the council and Egon Weidekamp rejected the agreement and told UNGBO that they would have to call on the police to evict Ryesgade 58. UNGBO complied, and the squatters were told that they had until September 14 to leave the house. The squatters then started to prepare the defense of Ryesgade 58. The stage was now set for what would be the biggest confrontation ever fought between the squatters and the police.

== September 14 demonstration ==
The police plan was to move in at midnight on September 14 and evict the house while the squatters were still in their beds. In past evictions, the police did not assault a house until long after the moment of the deadline, and the hope was to take the squatters by surprise and minimize the time available for them to prepare their defense. A couple of days before the eviction was to take place, posters were hung up all over the city. The posters invited people to come to a demonstration in support of the house. The poster showed a large image of a burning car and the text said that it was a good idea to show up with your face masked. This did raise some eyebrows at police headquarters, but in the end the police estimated that it was just a coincidence and that nothing big was underway. The police also thought that since the demonstration was held at 10:00 pm on a Sunday, not many people would attend.

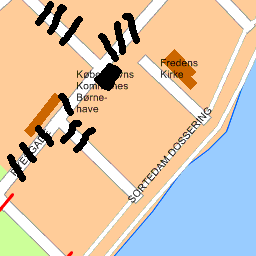
Map showing the position of the house and the surrounding lines of barricades

However, as the demonstration began at Rådhuspladsen, it was attended by well over 2000 masked demonstrators. They were very determined and aggressive and the police soon found themselves outmatched. As the demonstration moved towards Nørrebro, every police officer that could be spared was rushed to the demonstration. When the demonstrators reached Nørrebro, fireworks were fired into the air, and the demonstration suddenly changed direction and started to move towards Ryesgade. By this time, more people had joined the demonstration. Squatters present in the demonstration handed out flyers with the text "The fight is on." The police found themselves unable to control the demonstration and had to watch as the demonstration moved towards Ryesgade 58. When the demonstration was within a few hundred yards of Ryesgade, people started to run. The demonstration broke through the remaining police lines, and within a couple of minutes they had entered Ryesgade. While the police had been busy handling the demonstrators, the squatters in Ryesgade 58 had moved into the street and started to set up barbed-wire barricades. The obstacles had been prepared in advance, built over the summer in the courtyard behind the house, and they were not the only preparations the squatters had made. Most of them were wearing blue overall work suits, ski masks, and combat boots. Many of them were also wearing motorcycle helmets and carrying clubs and iron bars for close-quarters fighting with the police, and several were equipped with powerful slingshots. On top of that, several hundred Molotov cocktails were now being carried to the barricades. A large banner had been hung from the squat, reading "Rather die standing up, then living life on your knees!"

Under the supervision of the squatters, demonstrators expanded the barricades. They stole trailers and building materials from a nearby construction site to build more barricades. Soon the obstacles covered several streets, in places four or five layers deep. Cobblestones from the streets were broken up and distributed for use as missiles. Soon, the whole street had been turned into something like a fortress. After an hour, the police attacked with 50 men. They were quickly turned back by a hail of stones and iron pellets fired from slingshots. Several police officers were injured. The police then retreated, and both sides regrouped. Around 600 people, primarily youths, had chosen to remain behind the barricades and help the squatters defend the house.

== Second day ==
As the squatters awoke on the second day, they found themselves surrounded by an army of police. During the night, the Copenhagen police force had mustered over 400 men in riot gear. But at the same time, hundreds of citizens and many news reporters had also made their way to Ryesgade. The police had been planning to storm the barricades at dawn, but the presence of so many noncombatants people in the area, many of whom had made their way right up to the barricades and were now talking with the squatters, made their plans impossible. It was decided that the attack would have to be called off until the area just outside the obstacles was under firm police control and could be evacuated of all those not actively resisting.

While the police were busy trying to control the crowds, some of the reporters warned the squatters that the police were planning something big, and the squatters quickly organized a plan to counter the upcoming attack. The 700 defenders were organized in six groups. Each of the groups were charged with different parts of the defense. The barricades were divided into four sections, each with a group of defenders attached to it. These four groups were the biggest of the six groups (about 130 people strong) and were named "the standing units". The two other groups were named "the mobile unit" and "the house unit". The house unit was charged with defending the back entrance of the house and manning a lookout post on the roof. It was their responsibility to warn the others in case of an attack and to oversee many of the logistic tasks such as the making of more Molotov cocktails. They also had to prepare a final defense of the house in case the police broke through. The role of the mobile unit was as a reserve to support the standing units at the barricades. It was not attached to any particular barricade, but was free to move from place to place and assist if the defenders were in danger of being overwhelmed. Many people in this unit were given helmets and clubs for hand-to-hand fighting.

At about 1:30 am, the police attacked. A wave of about 150 of them in riot gear charged the western part of the barricades in a solid shield wall. Due to an early warning from the lookout post on top of the squat, the defenders were prepared. They bombarded the police with stones and petrol bombs, forcing them to retreat after about 10 minutes. Of the 150 police officers involved in the charge, only about 14 made it near the barricades, and about 40 police officers were injured in the attack.

The attackers then went to their backup plan, sending several squads of police in through the alleys and back houses surrounding Ryesgade. These squads would then go through an old shop and emerge well behind the barricades. The police were hoping that this would create a gap through which more police could flow, eventually establishing a bridgehead within Ryesgade. At 4:30, they sent the first squads in. The plan failed when local residents who had spotted the police moving through the back alleys warned the squatters.

The police broke down the door to the shop, only to find large, armed group of defenders waiting for them. The squatters started hurling stones through the shop window, and the police officers at the front soon found themselves trapped between the attacking squatters and the rush of police coming in from behind. Instead of retreating, the police commanders ordered their men to form a shield wall and tried to push their way into the street. The squatters responded by attempting to burn down the shop with the police inside, but the police had brought fire extinguishers with them and were able to put out the flames of the Molotov cocktail.

For a moment it looked as if the police would manage to push home their attack, but some of the squatters were armed with tear-gas grenades and threw three of them into the shop. The police were carrying gas masks but it was impossible to don them without breaking their shield wall and thus exposing themselves to the incoming stones. The police attack broke. Fifteen officers were injured, and another 20-30 had to be taken to hospital to have their eyes flushed because of the tear gas. After this, the police gave up trying to storm the barricades. The order was given that nobody was to try to enter the area. The police now focused on keeping the squatters inside the barricaded area. The police commanders feared that the squatters would try to expand the barricades to cut several main roads around the house.

The rest of the day saw a series of skirmishes between the police and the squatters. Normally these were just small incidents without any injuries to either side. The police now started to play the waiting game. This they hoped would give them time to re-organize and for extra forces from the rest of Denmark to arrive.

== End of siege ==
The next day, the situation in Ryesgade had become the talk of the nation. The national news broadcasters canceled shows in order to transmit live updates on the situation. Most elements of the press were very critical towards the squatters and their supporters. Headlines calling the squatters "a bunch of terrorists" and "masked maniacs" were common. The squatters found themselves facing groups of journalists, all asking questions and demanding answers from the defenders. The tone of the coverage angered the squatters, and they at first refused to talk to the press. But when the squatters found that they might be facing a prolonged siege, they eventually decided to address the media.

The press were invited behind the barricades for a press conference. Though the police had warned people from going near the barricaded area, dozens of reporters from all the large media outlets made their way to the barricades. Here they were met by representatives of the squatters. The squatters had prepared a manifesto explaining why they had acted as they had and listing their demands. In the manifesto, the squatters attacked the city council and the mayor, calling them "a bunch of arrogant bureaucrats," and furthermore stated that they would not leave the barricades until the negotiations were re-opened or another acceptable solution had been found.

Over the next couple of days, the tension increased. Several compromises were suggested by various parties but they were all rejected by the city council. At the same time, the police were beginning to prepare for a final assault against the defenders. This plan involved breaking through the barricades with armoured bulldozers acquired from the military. Several units of police were then going to charge the squat, some of them armed with submachine guns. About 1500 police had been drafted in for the assault. The police commanders stated that this assault would most likely result in the death of several people. Faced with an unyielding city council and the prospect of an eviction that would end in a bloodbath, the squatters decided to leave the barricades.

The squatters called another press conference for the morning of September 23, but reporters arrived to find the contested buildings empty. Overnight, the squatters had filtered out. This was done in small groups and without discovery from the police.
