= Urban Hansen =

Danish politician

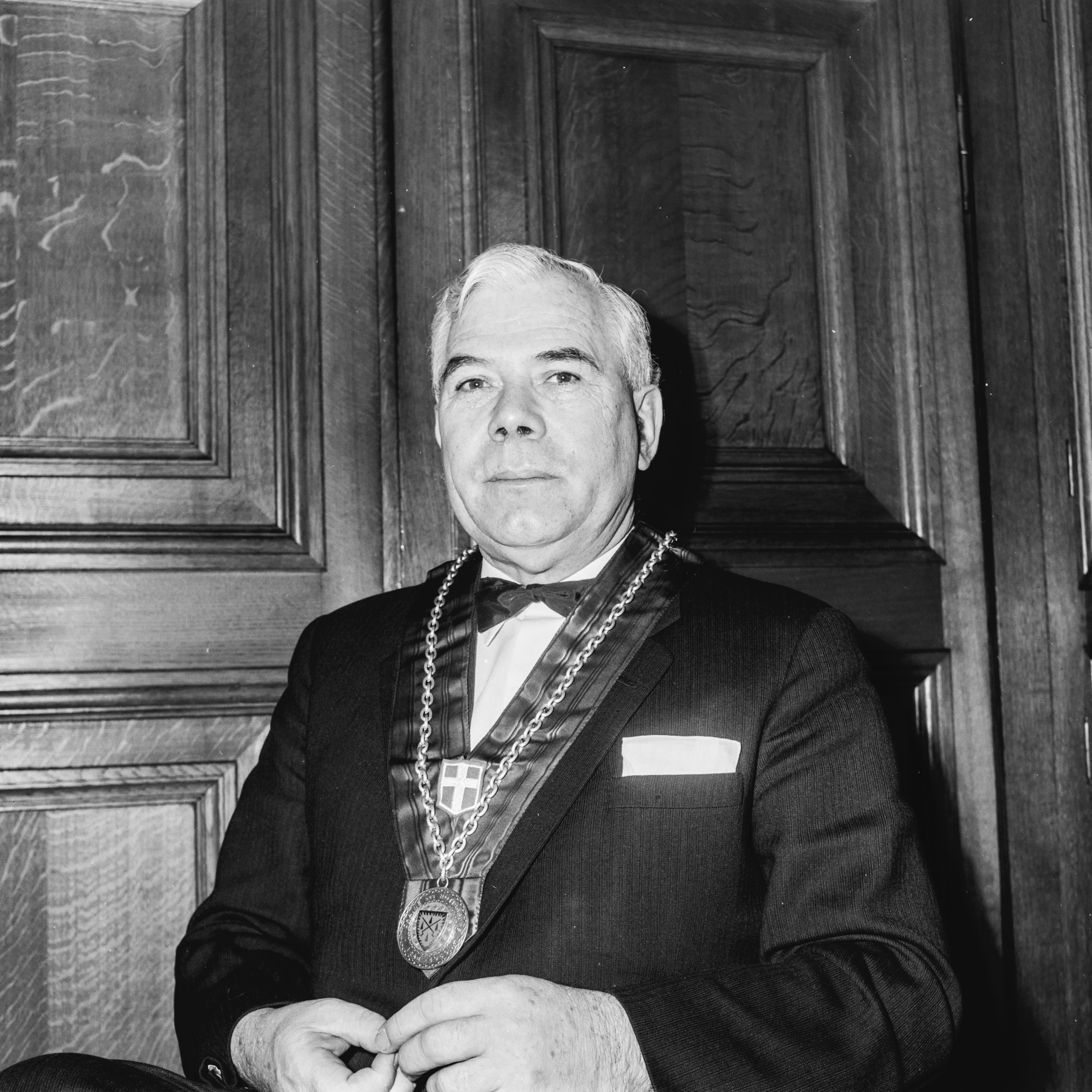
Urban Hansen in 1968

Urban Hansen (October 23, 1908 – July 24, 1986) was a Danish politician for the Social Democratic Party. From 1962 to 1976 he was the Lord Mayor of Copenhagen. He is the inspiration to the housing project Urbanplanen on Amager near Copenhagen.

Political offices
Preceded by Sigvard Munk	Lord Mayor of Copenhagen; 1962–1976	Succeeded by Egon Weidekamp
