= Tove Nielsen (politician) =

Danish teacher and politician (born 1941)

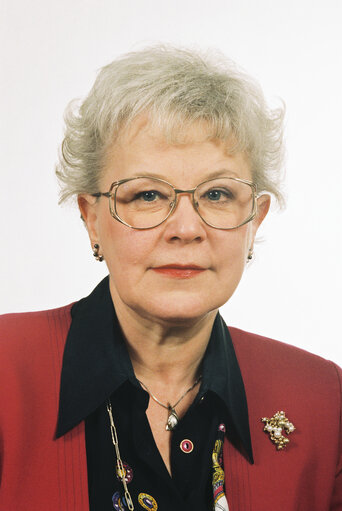

Minister of Education
- In office 19 December 1973 – 13 February 1975
- Prime Minister: Poul Hartling
- Preceded by: Ritt Bjerregaard
- Succeeded by: Ritt Bjerregaard

Personal details
- Born: 8 April 1941 (age 85) Durup, Salling, Denmark
- Party: Venstre
- Occupation: Teacher

Tove Nielsen (born 1941) is a Danish teacher who served as the minister of education in the cabinet led by Poul Hartling between 1973 and 1975. She was also a member of the Danish Parliament and European Parliament.

== Biography ==
Nielsen was born in Durup, Salling, on 8 April 1941. She obtained a teaching degree in 1964 and worked as a teacher until 1973. She was appointed minister of education to the cabinet of Prime Minister Poul Hartling on 19 December 1973. She replaced Ritt Bjerregaard in the post. Nielsen was in office until 13 February 1975 and was replaced by Ritt Bjerregaard in the post.

Nielsen served in the Danish parliament as part of Venstre for three terms: 1972–1973, 1975–1977 and 1979–1980. She resigned from the parliament in 1980. Then she served in the European Parliament between 1979 and 1994.
