= Lars Engberg =

Danish politician (1943–2017)

Lord Mayor of Copenhagen
- In office 25 October 2004 – 31 December 2005

Personal details
- Born: 27 January 1943
- Died: 17 February 2017 (aged 74)
- Party: Social Democrats

Lars Engberg (27 January 1943 – 17 February 2017) was a Danish politician for the Social Democratic Party. He was a member of the council for Region Hovedstaden and acting Lord Mayor of Copenhagen.

Lars Engberg was a member of the City Council of Copenhagen from 1982 to 2005. When Jens Kramer Mikkelsen resigned from the office of lord mayor of Copenhagen before time on 25 October 2004, Lars Engberg took the office until 31 December 2005, when he was replaced by Ritt Bjerregaard and instead was elected into the council for the newly formed regional council.

== Notes ==
Political offices
Preceded by Jens Kramer Mikkelsen	Lord Mayor of Copenhagen; 25 October 2004 – 31 December 2005	Succeeded by Ritt Bjerregaard
