= Jens Kramer Mikkelsen =

Danish politician (born 1951)

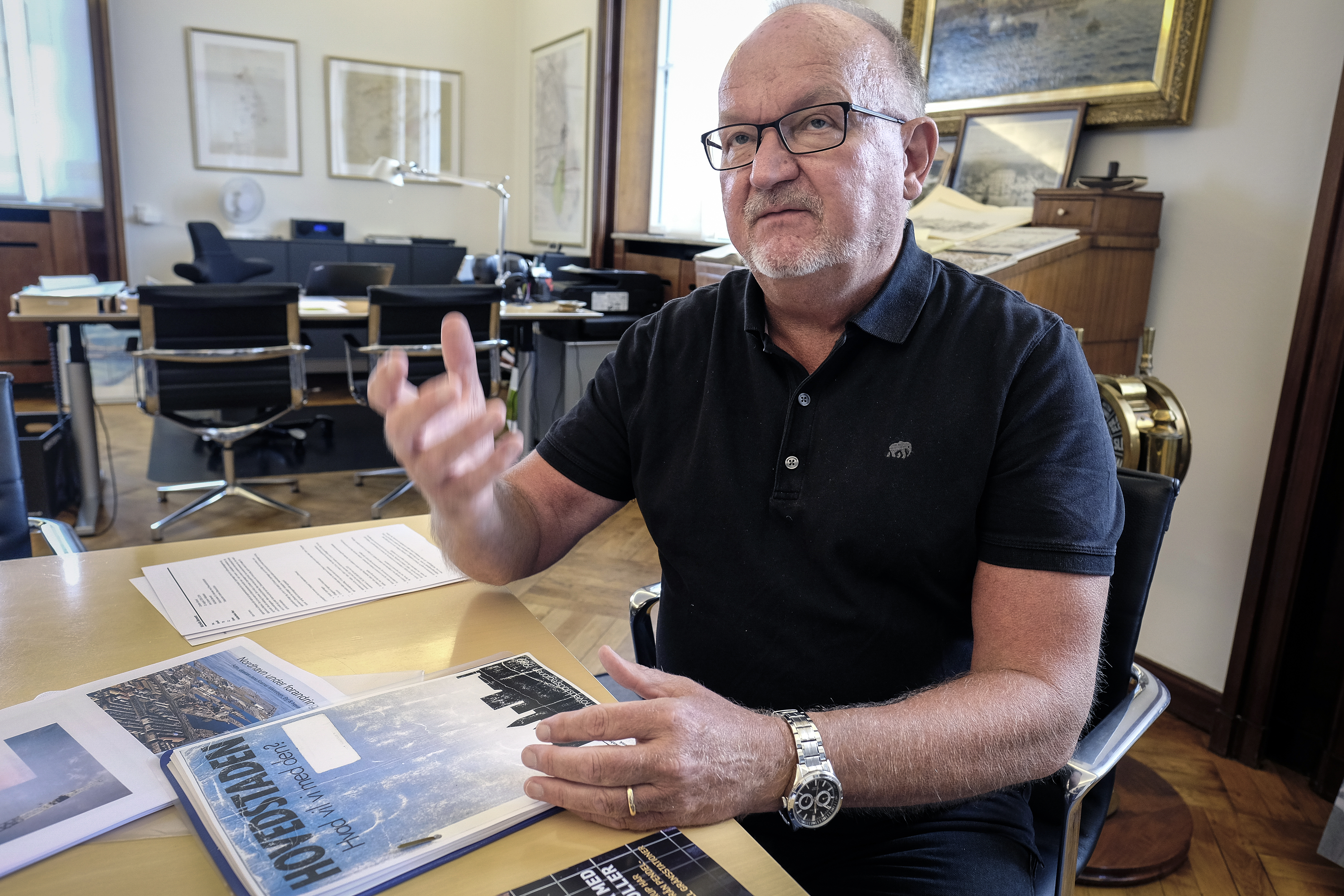

Lord Mayor of Copenhagen
- In office 1 December 1989 – 24 October 2004
- Preceded by: Egon Weidekamp
- Succeeded by: Lars Engberg

Personal details
- Born: 16 December 1951 (age 74) Copenhagen, Denmark
- Party: Social Democrats

Jens Kramer Mikkelsen (born 16 December 1951) was the Lord Mayor of Copenhagen for the Social Democratic Party from 1989 to 2004 and he is the longest-serving mayor in the City of Copenhagen. In 2004, Kramer became the CEO of the Ørestad Development Corporation (Ørestadsselskabet I/S) and the company merged with Copenhagen Harbor in 2007 where Kramer was appointed CEO of CPH City & Port where he served until 2018. Currently, Kramer is Director of Urban Development at Nordic Real Estate Partners (NREP) and he holds a number of board positions in various companies and NGOs.

== Early life and education ==
Jens Kramer Mikkelsen was born in the Østerbro district of Copenhagen in 1951. He graduated as a primary school teacher from Seminariet på Emdrupborg in 1976. He then worked as a Danish and Math teacher at Grundtvigsskolen in Copenhagen until he became Lord Mayor of Copenhagen in 1989.

== Political career ==
Kramer Mikkelsen was a member of the local government of Copenhagen since 1989 until his resignation as Lord Mayor.

On 7 June 2004, Jens Kramer Mikkelsen announced that he would not run for the municipal elections in 2005, but that he would continue in office until the end of his period on 31 December 2005. However, on 27 September 2004 he announced that he would resign both from the city council and thus from office as of 15 November to become CEO of Ørestadsselskabet. His successor until the elections as Lord Mayor was Lars Engberg.

In the elections of 2001, Jens Kramer Mikkelsen received 27,417 personal votes.

== Later career ==
On 24 October 2004, Jens Kramer Mikkelsen resigned as Mayor of Copenhagen to assume a position as CEO in Ørestadsselskabet. He led the merger of the company with Copenhagen Harbor in 2007 and held the position as CEO of the new company – owned by the City of Copenhagen and the Danish Government named CPH City & Port Development – until 2018. A month later, Kramer took a position at the real estate investment and development company Nordic Real Estate Partners (NREP) where he currently serves as Director of Urban Development. Kramer is Chairman of the Copenhagen Airport Growth Committee, Sankt Annæ Gymnasium, DFHO and Copenhagen Goodwill Ambassadors and a member of the Board at Enigma Museum for Communication and the Danish start-up company Donkey Republic.

Political offices
Preceded by Egon Weidekamp	Lord Mayor of Copenhagen; 1989 – 15 November 2004	Succeeded by Lars Engberg
