= Nørrebro Bryghus =

Brewery in Copenhagen, Denmark

Coordinates: 55.6902°N 12.5639°E

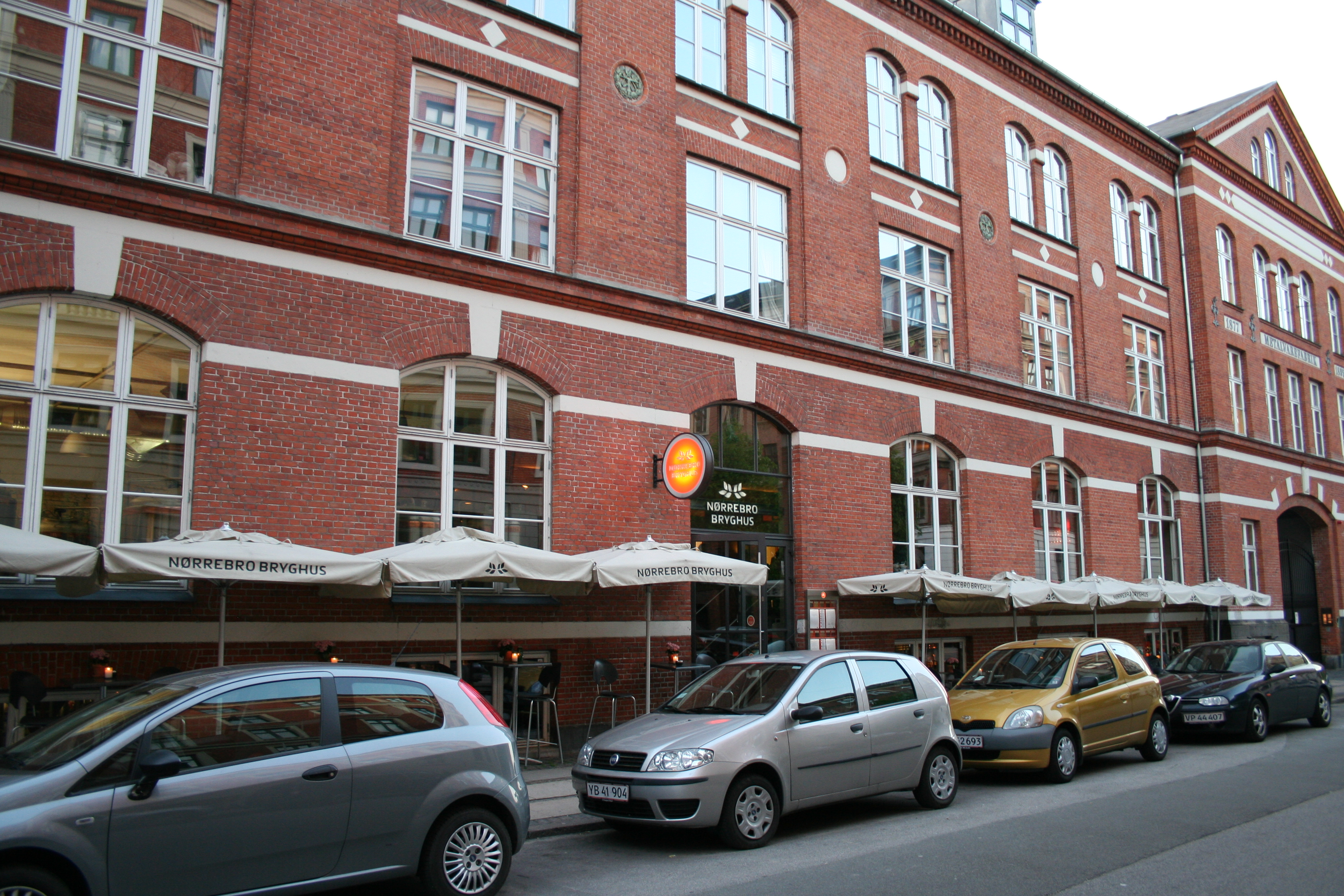
Nørrebro Bryghus on Ravnsborggade in Copenhagen

Nørrebro Bryghus is a Danish microbrewery located in the Nørrebro neighborhood of Copenhagen. They have an annual production of 50,000-60,000 hectoliters.

Nørrebro Bryghus opened in September 2003 and was founded by ex-Carlsberg brewmaster Anders Kissmeyer. The brewery is known for their wide array of beer styles and for producing beer in the American microbrewery tradition.

In both 2008 and 2010 the brewery won awards at the World Beer Cup, the biggest international beer competition in the world.

In January 2023 Nørrebro Bryghus was bought by Royal Unibrew, Denmark's second largest brewing group.

== Awards ==
- 2003 - Brewery of the Year, Danske Ølentusiaster
- 2008 - Bronze Medal, Stevns CCC, World Beer Cup (Sour & Fruit beer)
- 2008 - Bronze Medal, Little Korkny Ale, World Beer Cup (Aged Beer)
- 2010 - Gold Medal, Little Korkny Ale Niepoort Barrel, World Beer Cup (Barley Wine-Style Ale)
- 2010 - Gold Medal, Seven Imperial Stout Niepoort Barrel, World Beer Cup (American-Style Imperial Stout)
- 2010 - Silver Medal, Viking Oud Bruin, World Beer Cup (American-Style Sour Ale)
