= Nazareth Church, Copenhagen =

Nazareth Church
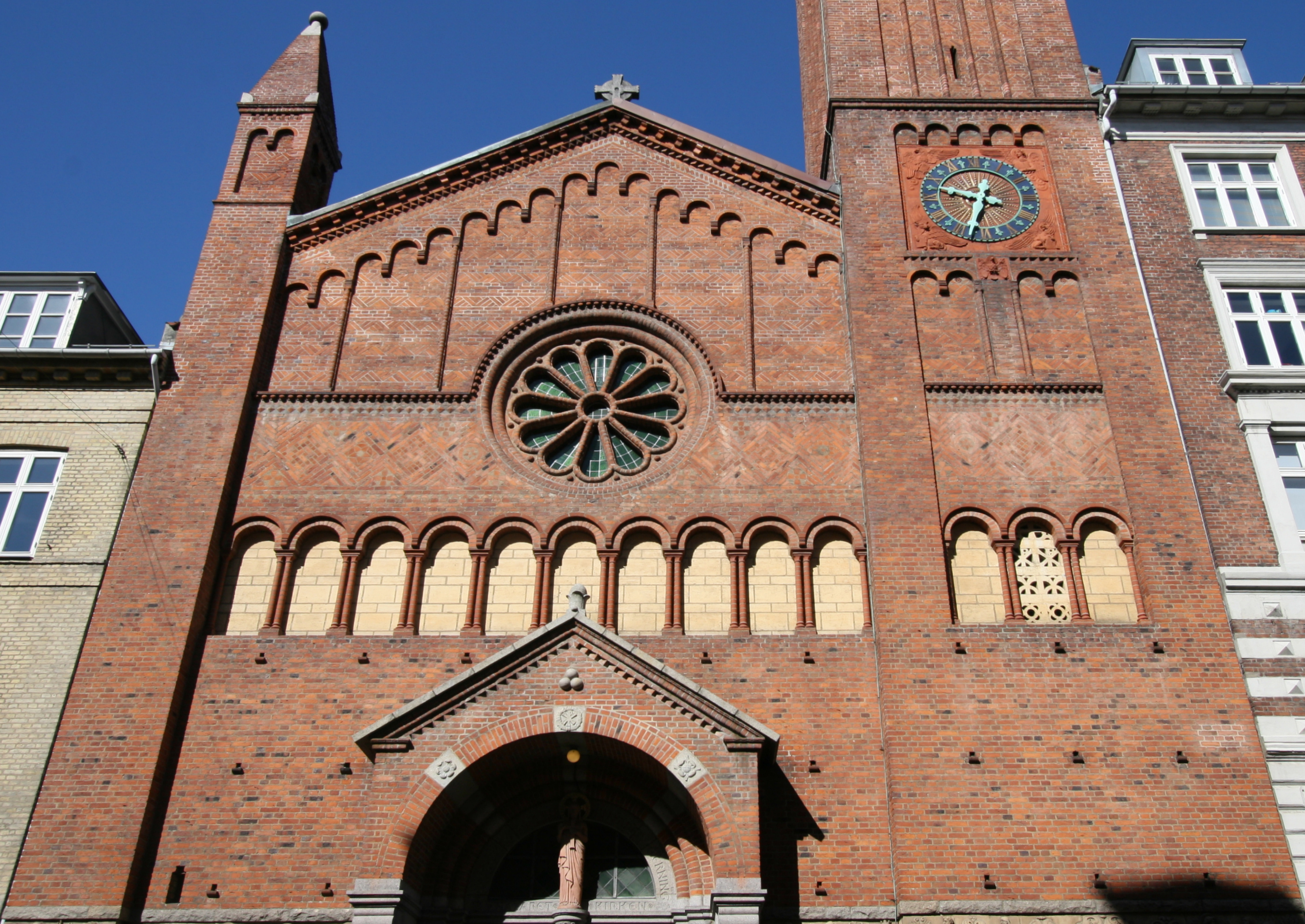
- Nazareth Church
- 55°41′50.2″N 12°34′30.8″E
- Location: Østerbro, Copenhagen
- Country: Denmark
- Denomination: Church of Denmark

History
- Status: Church

Architecture
- Architect: Victor Nyebølle
- Architectural type: Church
- Style: Romanesque Revival
- Completed: 1904

Specifications
- Height: 50 m
- Materials: Brick

Administration
- Diocese: Diocese of Copenhagen

Nazareth Church (Danish: Nazareth Kirke) is a Church of Denmark parish church located at Ryesgade in the Østerbro district of Copenhagen, Denmark.

== History ==
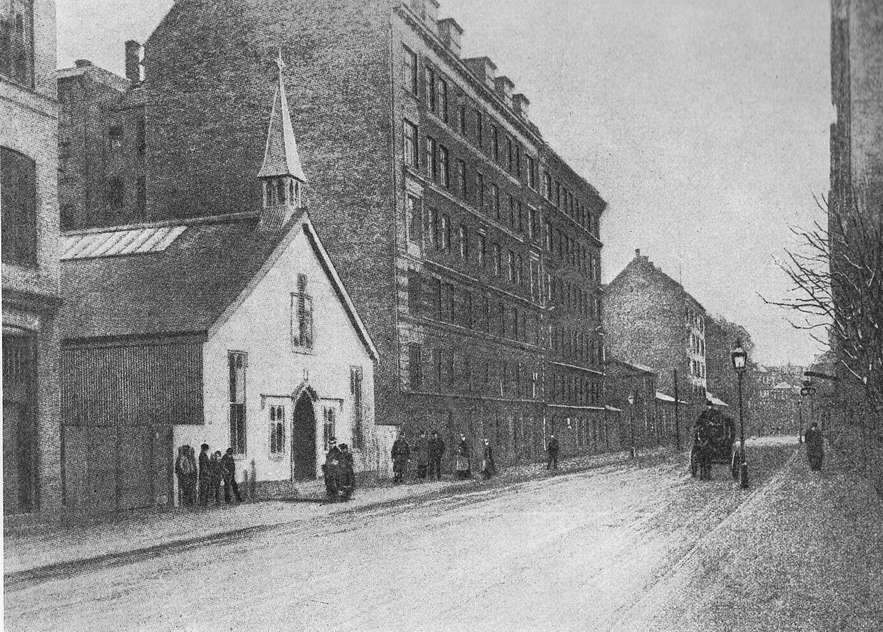
The temporary church

The population of the new Nørrebro and Østerbro districts grew rapidly in the second half of the 19th century. The first church in the area, St- John's, had soon become too small.

A young catechist named C. J. Holt conducted open air services in the garden at Ruesgade 105. A church society was therefore established with the purpose of building a church in the densely populated Ryesgade neighborhood. A temporary church financed by the Copenhagen Church Foundation was constructed in 1892.

In 1897 a committee was established with the goal of raising enough funds for the construction of a proper church. The new church was designed by the architect Victor Nyebølle and was his first work in Copenhagen. The temporary church was therefore moved to Sjællandsgade in Nørrebro. The foundation stone was set on 8 May 1902 and the church was inaugurated on 8 May 1904.

The parish was in 1905 divided in two when the Church of Peace was completed further down the street.

== Architecture ==
The church is designed with inspiration from Romanesque churches of Northern Italy. It is constructed in red brick and stands on a foundation of granite ashlars. The narrow facade towards the street consists of a gable motif flanked by a tall, slender tower to the right and a lower pinacle to the left. The facade features a relief with biblical motif created by Thomas Bærentzen (1869-1936). Over the entrance sits a Christ figure.
