= Ritt Bjerregaard =

Danish politician (1941–2023)

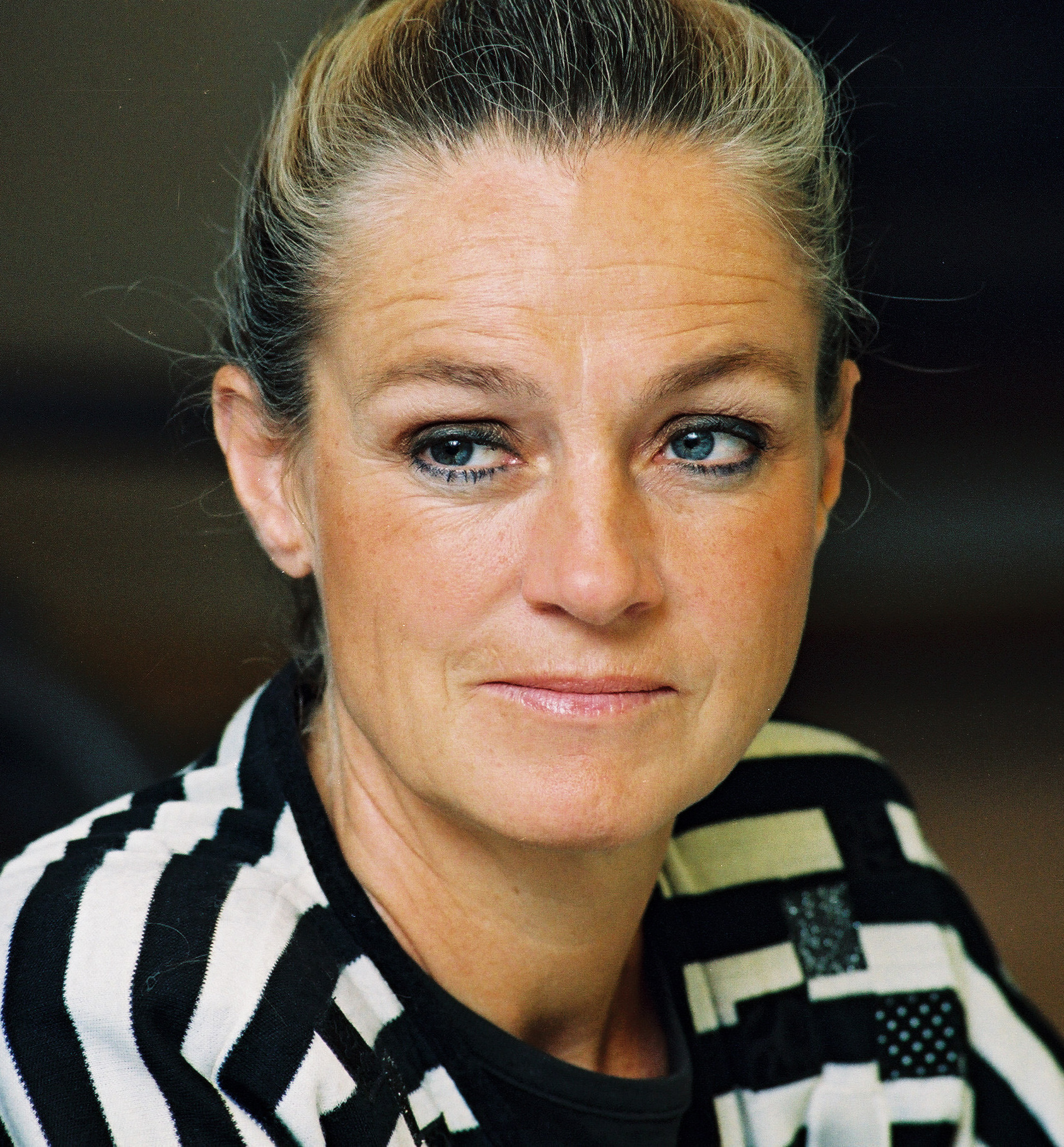
- Bjerregaard in 1995

Lord Mayor of Copenhagen
- In office 1 January 2006 – 31 December 2009
- Preceded by: Lars Engberg
- Succeeded by: Frank Jensen

Minister for Food, Agriculture and Fisheries of Denmark
- In office 23 February 2000 – 21 November 2001
- Preceded by: Henrik Dam Kristensen
- Succeeded by: Mariann Fischer Boel

European Commissioner for the Environment
- In office 1 January 1995 – 15 March 1999
- Preceded by: Ioannis Paleokrassas
- Succeeded by: Margot Wallström

Social Minister of Denmark
- In office 26 October 1979 – 30 December 1981
- Preceded by: Erling Jensen
- Succeeded by: Bent Hansen

Education Minister of Denmark
- In office 13 February 1975 – 5 January 1979
- Preceded by: Tove Nielsen
- Succeeded by: Dorte Bennedsen

Education Minister of Denmark
- In office 27 September 1973 – 19 December 1973
- Preceded by: Knud Heinesen
- Succeeded by: Tove Nielsen

Personal details
- Born: 19 May 1941 Copenhagen, Denmark
- Died: 21 January 2023 (aged 81) Copenhagen, Denmark
- Party: Social Democrats
- Spouse: Søren Mørch
- Education: University of Copenhagen

Ritt Bjerregaard (full name Jytte Ritt Bjerregaard; 19 May 1941 – 21 January 2023) was a Danish politician who was a member of the Danish Social Democrats, and was Lord Mayor of Copenhagen from 1 January 2006 to 2010.

Bjerregaard was Education Minister from 27 September to 19 December and again from 13 February 1975 to 22 December 1978. 1973 and from 1975 to 1978 in the Cabinets of Anker Jørgensen I, II and III, and Social Minister from 1979 to 1981 in Anker Jørgensen's fourth cabinet. She was European Commissioner for the Environment from 1994 to 1999 and Minister for Food, Agriculture and Fisheries in the Cabinet of Poul Nyrup Rasmussen IV from 2000 to 2001.

== Political career ==
Bjerregaard was a member of the Danish parliament (Folketinget) from 21 September 1971 to 22 January 1995 and from 20 November 2001 until 8 February 2005. She was a minister of various cabinets under Anker Jørgensen, and Poul Nyrup Rasmussen. In 1971 she was elected to the Odense City Council where she served just one term and resigned in 1973. In 1971 and 1975-1978 she held the position as minister of education, where she changed the Primary School Act in 1975 with the support from the majority of the other parties. On 5 November 1975, Bjerregaard hired an external chancellor for Roskilde University. Venstre and Conservative People's Party wanted to abolish the university, but thanks to the independent politician, former Conservative People's Party member Hans Jørgen Lembourn, the university was saved. In 1976 she introduced restricted admission at universities while meanwhile securing the protection of minorities. In 1977 Bjerregaard got the law about Erhvervsfaglige Grunduddannelser – EFG (Vocational basic training) approved. With former head of department Erik Ib Schmidt she launched the ambitious, complete education plan U 90 from 1978. After the fall of the Berlin Wall, Ritt changed her stance on the EU. After being an opponent for many years, she became chair of the Danish European Movement (Den Danske Europabevægelse).

Bjerregaard was the European Commissioner for Environment, Nuclear Safety and Civil Protection in the Santer Commission from 1995 to 1999, representing Denmark. She has attended at least one Bilderberg Group meeting from 8–11 June 1995. She has also attended Trilateral Commission meetings in 1992, 1998 and 2002.

Bjerregaard was involved with various organisations. She was vice-president of both OSCE's Parliamentary Assembly and Socialist International Women (SIW) from 1992 to 1994. Four days after Bjerregaard was appointed Minister of Food in February 2000, the first case of mad cow disease, a dangerous brain disease, occurred. With the ministry Bjerregaard acted fast and consistently. The butchering methods were changed and a ban on risk products was installed. These consistent measures were at first not received well, neither by the farmers nor the food industry. Especially the initiative to withdraw certain foods from the retailers was criticised. But later on the industry realized that the measures protected the consumers and created great confidence in Danish food products in the export market. In 2001 Bjerregaard introduced the Smiley system. It caused an occasion for big discussions but today the system is generally recognized.

Bjerregaard won the election for Lord Mayor on the Copenhagen City Council for the Social Democrats on 16 November 2005, a position she acquired through a high number of personal votes. During her time as Lord Mayor of Copenhagen, Ritt invited mayors of cities around the world to a summit on the climate in the cities. The summit was a prelude to COP15, which took place in Copenhagen. At the summit, Ritt Bjerregaard wished to discuss what big cities could do to lower CO_{2}-emissions. The meeting was successful and mayors made a promise to take action.

== Controversy ==
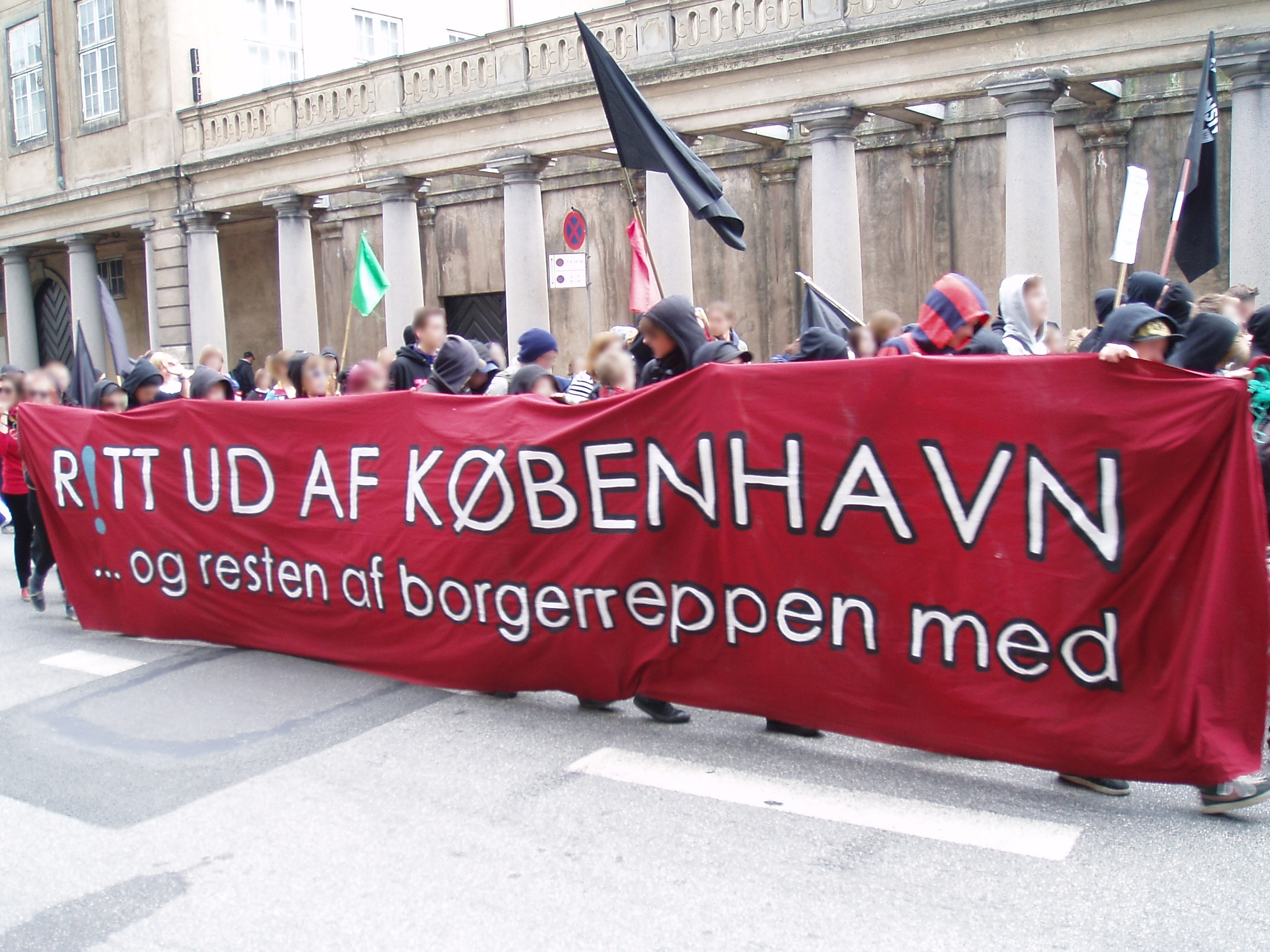
Demonstration against Ritt Bjerregaard following the clearing of Ungdomshuset. Meaning: R!TT OUT OF COPENHAGEN... and the rest the city council too

During her time as minister of education in 1978, she stayed in a luxury suite at the Ritz Hotel in Paris during a Unesco conference, and this forced her to step down when it became known. Later on The National Audit Office declared that she had not spent more money than other ministers. This later fueled a debate at the Danish Parliament. She returned to politics again soon hereafter in 1979 as social minister.

In the early 1990s it was revealed she had used her connections within the Social Democratic organisations to get a large flat in Copenhagen, although she rarely used it, living on Funen. She was then forced to step down as parliamentary group leader of the Social Democrats. After a year, the case was dropped by the municipality.

=== '5,000 Cheap Flats' promise ===
Her main campaign promise for the city council elections of 2005 was to erect 5,000 cheap dwellings for 5,000 kroner (US$948) rent a month within five years, should she be elected Lord Mayor. This would allow an average-earning couple, such as policemen and nurses, to gain access to the expensive housing market in Copenhagen. Economists and other experts criticised the plan for being impossible to implement. As of the summer of 2007, twelve such flats had been built.

On 11 July 2007, Bjerregaard claimed she never promised Copenhageners would get 5,000 cheap dwellings within five years, but merely that she would work for that aim. She claimed many unexpected and legal obstacles had come about, and that the government obstructed the issue. She also expected, however, that the 5,000 flats would be ready within seven to ten years.

=== Leadership ===
Since the November 2005 city elections, three prominent Social Democrats have left their fraction: Winnie Berndtson, Finn Rudaizky and Winnie Larsen-Jensen. In June 2007, long-time city politician Larsen-Jensen claimed:

As a city council member I have experienced four Lord Mayors. Ritt is the most autocratic, absolutist, centralist and undemocratic of all.

In return, Bjerregaard claimed that Larsen-Jensen "suffered personal problems" which could not be commented on in public. The opposition, as well of the left-wing factions, have accused Ritt of dictatorial conduct and obstructing their insight into political cases.

Bjerregaard is regarded as one of the four most influential Social Democrats from the so-called golden generation, the others being Mogens Lykketoft, Svend Auken and Poul Nyrup Rasmussen.

=== Office refurbishment ===
In August 2007, Bjerregaard ordered custom designed furniture for her Lord Mayor office at a cost of 850,000 kroner (US$161,000).

== Personal life ==
Bjerregaard grew up in Vesterbro in Copenhagen as the daughter of joiner Gudmund Bjerregaard and bookkeeper Rita Bjerregaard. She was the oldest of three siblings. She was hospitalized several times because of narrow and unhealthy conditions, until the family acquired an allotment. She finished her exam from Christianshavn Gymnasium in 1958 and became a modern side student from Statens Kursus til Studentereksamen in 1966.

After getting her teachers' certificate in 1964 from Emdrupborg, she worked as a folkeskole (primary school) teacher until 1970. In the same period she was a consultant for publishing house Gyldendal. In 1971, she became assistant professor at Odense College of Education. She has been married to historian Søren Mørch since 1966.

In her spare time, she was a gardener on her organically-managed manor, mostly growing apples.

Bjerregaard wrote several books during her life, latest being the first volume of her memoirs titled 'Ritt' (2015).

== Death ==
Bjerregaard died of cancer at her home in Copenhagen on 21 January 2023, at the age of 81.

Political offices
Preceded by Knud Heinesen	Education Minister of Denmark; 27 September 1973 – 19 December 1973	Succeeded by Tove Nielsen
Preceded by Tove Nielsen	Education Minister of Denmark; 13 February 1975 – 5 January 1979	Succeeded by Dorte Bennedsen
Preceded by Erling Jensen	Social Minister of Denmark; 26 October 1979 – 30 December 1981	Succeeded by Bent Hansen
Preceded by Ioannis Paleokrassas	European Commissioner for the Environment; 1 January 1995 – 15 March 1999	Succeeded by Margot Wallström
Preceded by Henning Christophersen	Danish European Commissioner; 1 January 1995 – 15 March 1999	Succeeded by Poul Nielson
Preceded by Henrik Dam Kristensen	Minister for Food, Agriculture and Fisheries of Denmark; 23 February 2000 – 27 November 2001	Succeeded by Mariann Fischer Boel
Preceded by Lars Engberg	Lord Mayor of Copenhagen; 1 January 2006 – 31 December 2009	Succeeded by Frank Jensen
