= Benny Goldschmidt =

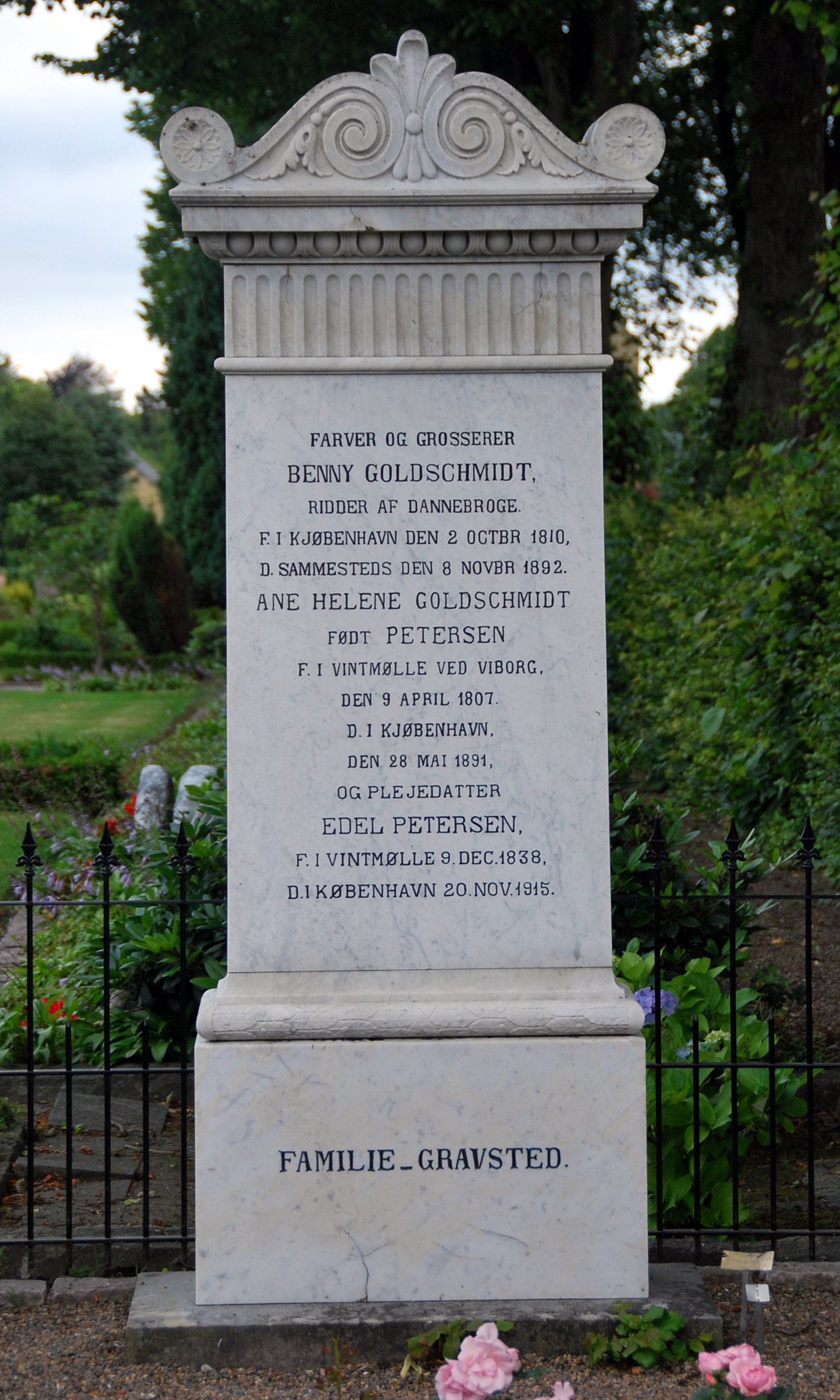

Benny Goldschmidt (2 October 1810 - 8 November 1892) was a Jewish-Danish businessman and philanthropist. He was one of the two owners of Goldschmidt & Nordholm and the founder of Goldschmidts Stiftelse at Ryesgade 19 in Copenhagen.

== Early life and education ==
Goldschmidt was born on 2 October 1810 in Copenhagen, the son of J. S. Goldschmidt (1774-1850). His father had established his own dyeing plant in 1800. Benny Goldschmidt apprenticed as a dyer in Viborg.

== Career ==
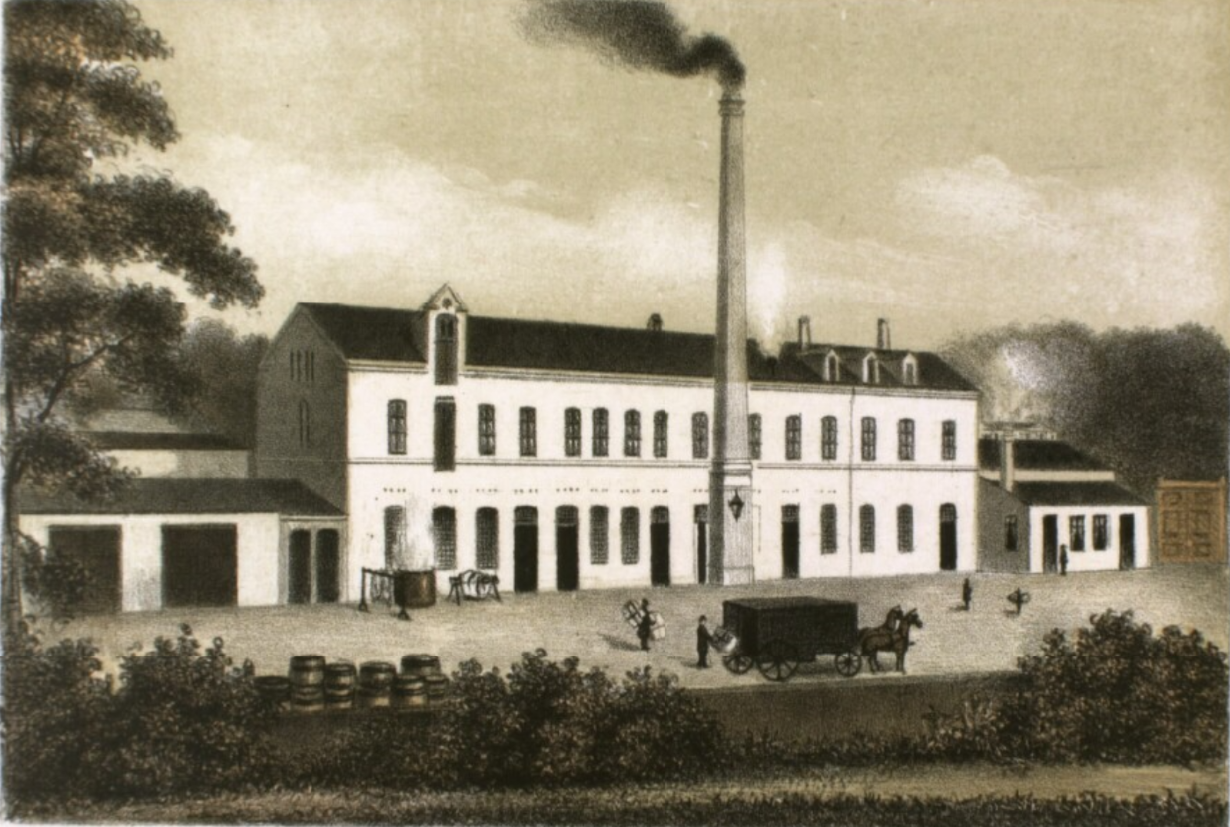
Goldschmidt & Nordholm's dyeing plant at Ryesgade 23

Goldschmidt returned to Copenhagen to manage his father's factory in 1835 and became the owner of the factory in 1842. Its name was changed to Goldschmidt & Nordholm when he in 1869 entered into a partnership with Swedish dyer Anders Nordholm (born 1848) and a new wool yarn dyeing plant was that same year inaugurated at Ryesgade 23.

Benny Goldschmidt retired in 1880, ceding his share of the company to his nephew Johan Goldschmidt (born 1855, name changed to Guildal om 1907).

== Personal life and legacy ==
Goldschmidt married Anna Helene Christensdatter, Petersen in Viborg. They had no children and were both buried at Viborg Cemetery. They founded Grosserer B. Goldschmidts og hustrus stiftelse om 1872 and a building with free or affordable housing for indigent dyers was completed at Ryesgade 31 in 1893. They left a grant of DKK 6,000 and J. F. Willumsen's monumental painting Glassmakers at Hellerup Glassworks to the city of Viborg. The painting has since 2009 been loaned out to the Willumsen Museum in Frederikssund.

== See also ==
- Sigfred Goldschmidt
