= Egon Weidekamp =

Danish politician

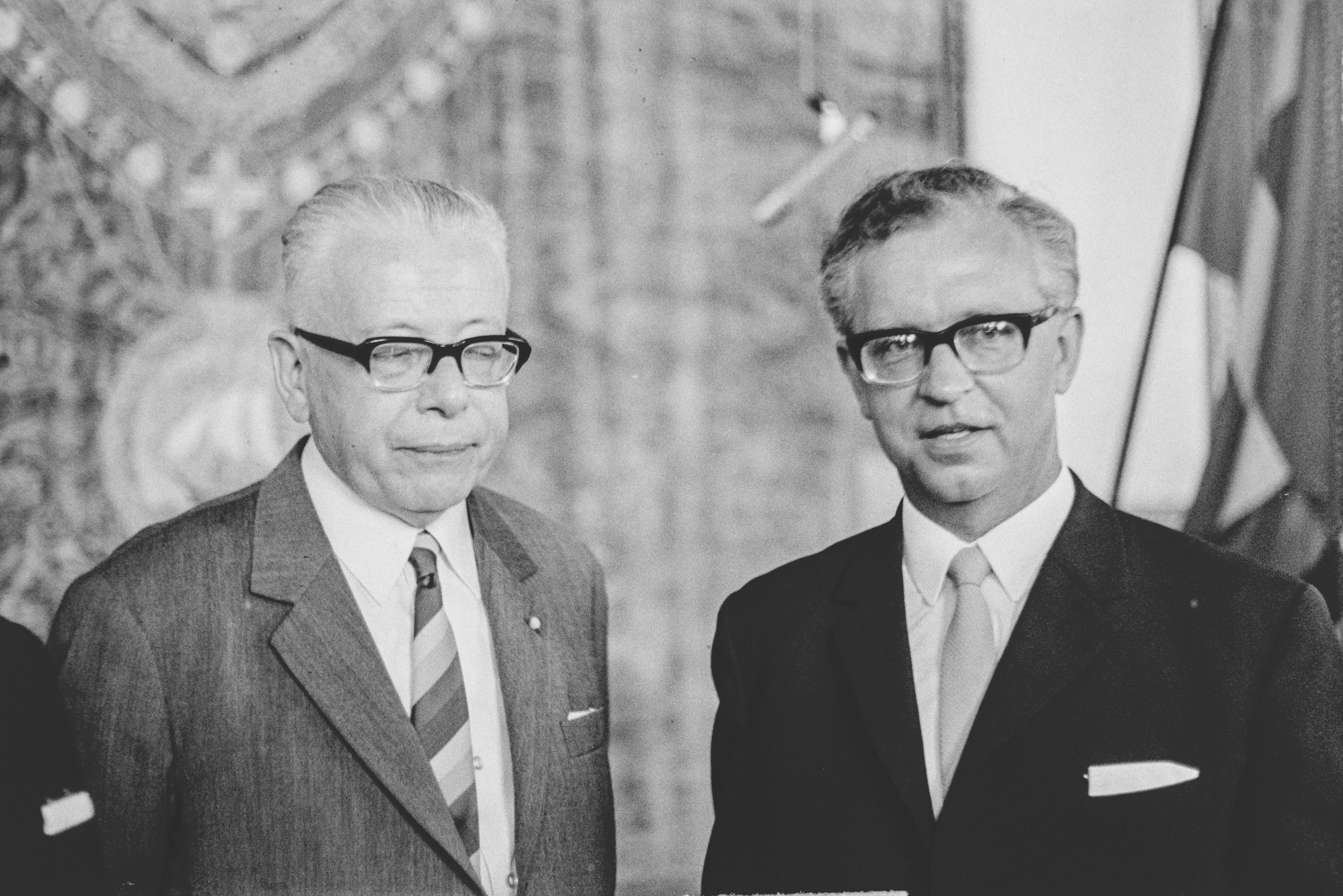
Weidekamp (right) with in Gustav Heinemann 1970, by Mogens Falk-Sørensen

Egon Holde Weidekamp (14 March 1921, Copenhagen – 26 April 2000, Copenhagen) was a Danish politician.

The political career of Weidekamp started in 1946 when he became the national leader of DSU, the youth branch of the Social Democratic Party, a position he held until 1950. In 1952 he was elected to the city council of Copenhagen for the Social Democratic Party, of which he became the president from 1970 to 1976. From 1976 to 1989, he held the office of Lord Mayor of Copenhagen.

The primary focus of Egon Weidekamp was to provide better apartments for the citizens of Copenhagen, primarily by renewing many of the worst apartments of the city. He is widely known in Denmark for giving the rights to use Ungdomshuset on Jagtvej 69 (which was torn down in 2007) to the group of squatters called BZ-bevægelsen after many years of social unrest and riots. In 1982, he said in an interview to Danish tabloid newspaper B.T.: "They get a house, and we get peace."

Egon Weidekamp also made the decision of closing the system of trams in the streets of Copenhagen. When resigning as lord mayor, Egon Weidekamp said that his two biggest regrets were the donation of Ungdomshuset and closing the tram system.

Political offices
Preceded by Urban Hansen	Lord Mayor of Copenhagen; 1976 – 1989	Succeeded by Jens Kramer Mikkelsen
