= Ravnsborggade =

Street in Copenhagen Municipality, Denmark

Coordinates: 55.6889°N 12.5624°E

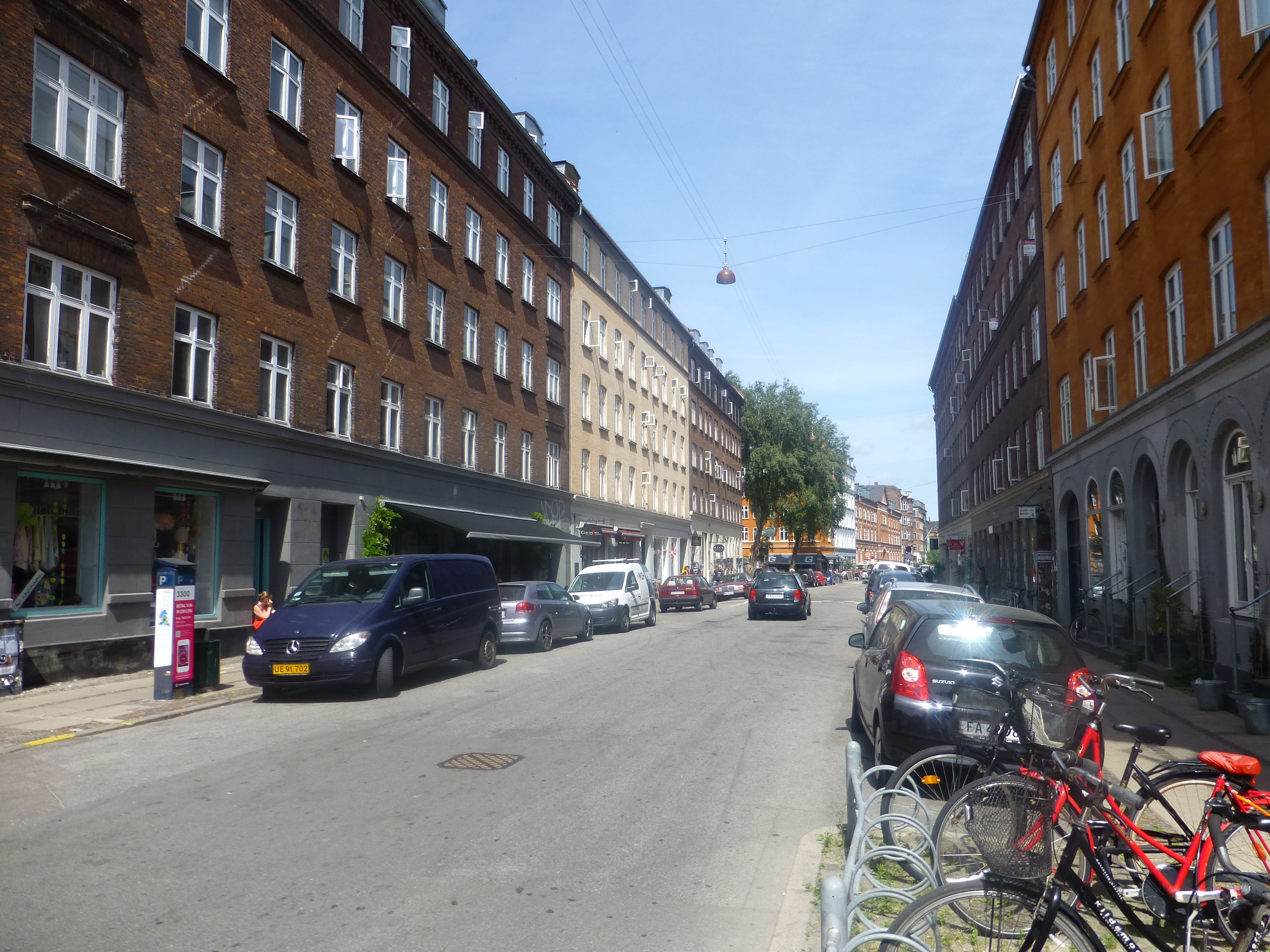
Ravnsborggade

Ravnsborggade (lit. 'Ravnsborg Street') is a street located one block west of The Lakes in the Nørrebro district of Copenhagen, Denmark. It runs from the major shopping street Nørrebrogade in the southwest to Sankt Hansgade in the northeast where it turns into Ryesgade.

The street is traditionally known for its many antique shops but they have increasingly been supplanted by cafés and restaurants in the 2010s. The street is the site of a flea market in the summer months.

== History ==
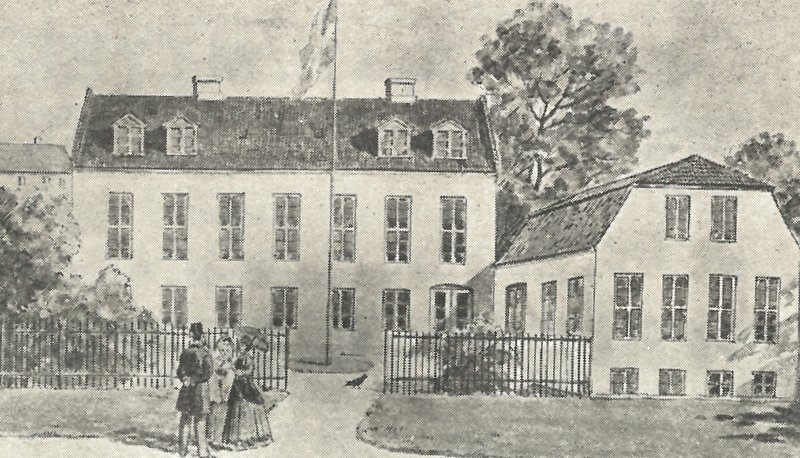
Store Ravnsborg

Ravnsborggade was established in 1852 when the so-called demarcation line was moved to The Lakes. Ravnsborg was originally the name of a defensive structure which ran long the outer margin of The Lakes. Store Ravnsborg (Great Ravnsborg) was later the name of a popular guesthouse located at the site of the street. Its land was sold off in lots in the years after the street was established. The main building was operated as an entertainment venue and a theatre opened at the site in 1886.

== Notable buildings and residents ==
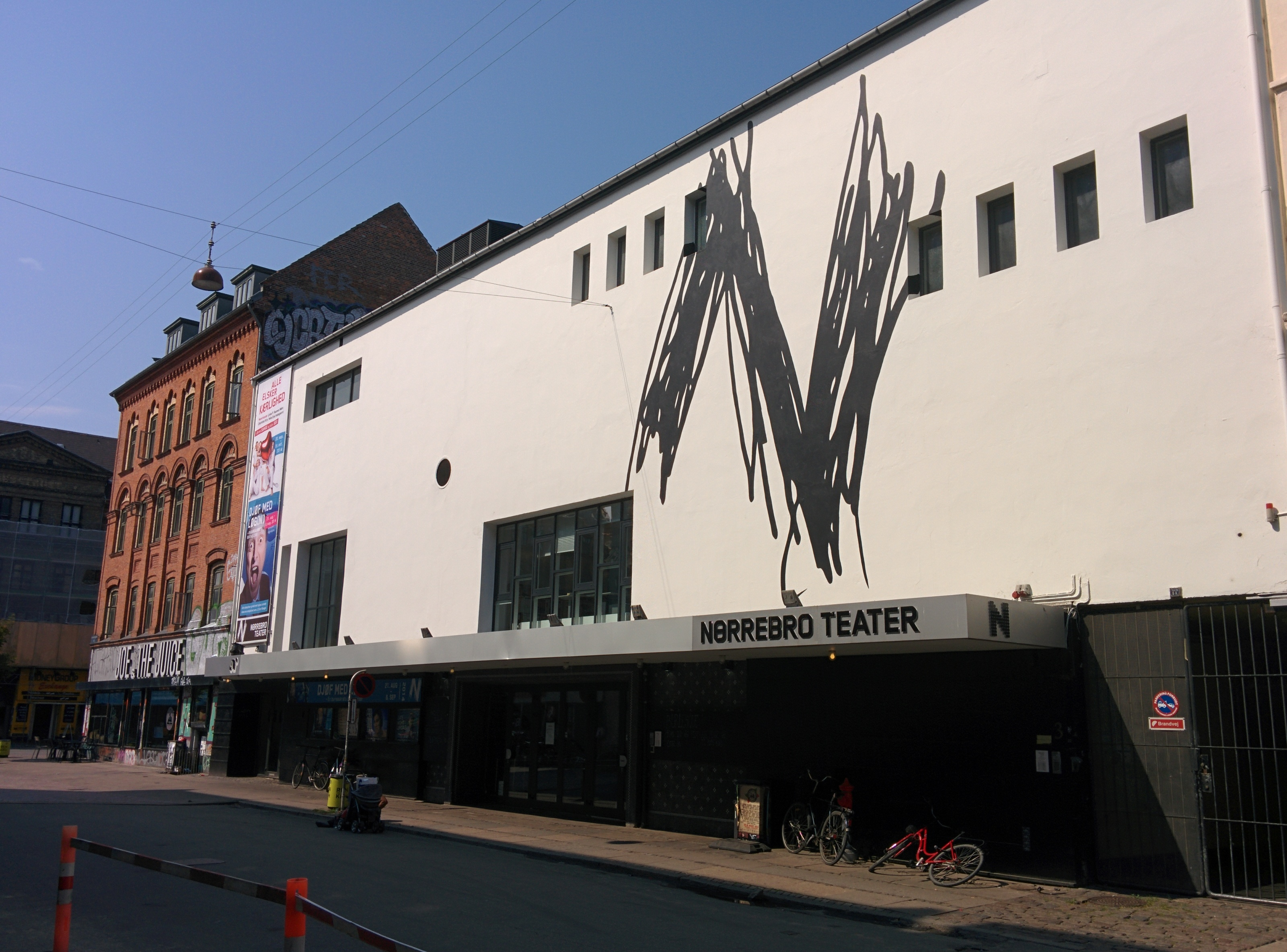
No. 3: Nørrebro Theater

Nørrebros Theater traces its history back to the theatre which was founded at Store Ravnsborg in 1886. The current building is from 1931 to 1932 and was designed by Vilhelm Lauritzen but has been altered. It is a member of the Københavns Teater collaboration.

The block between Nørrebrogade and Ravnsborg Tværgade is known as the Irma Block (Danish: Irma Karréen). The supermarket chain Irma was founded at the site 1886. The oldest part of the 20,000 square metre block was built in 1871. It was renovated with the assistance of Årstiderne Arkitekter in 2014. Madklubben opened three restaurants in the complex in 2015. One of them is located in a former Irma warehouse in the interior courtyard.

No. 11 was part of Fælledvejen School on Fælledvej (No. 12) on the other side of the block. It closed in 1985.
