= 8 House =

Mixed-use development in Copenhagen, Denmark

Coordinates: 55°36′59.9″N 12°34′18″E

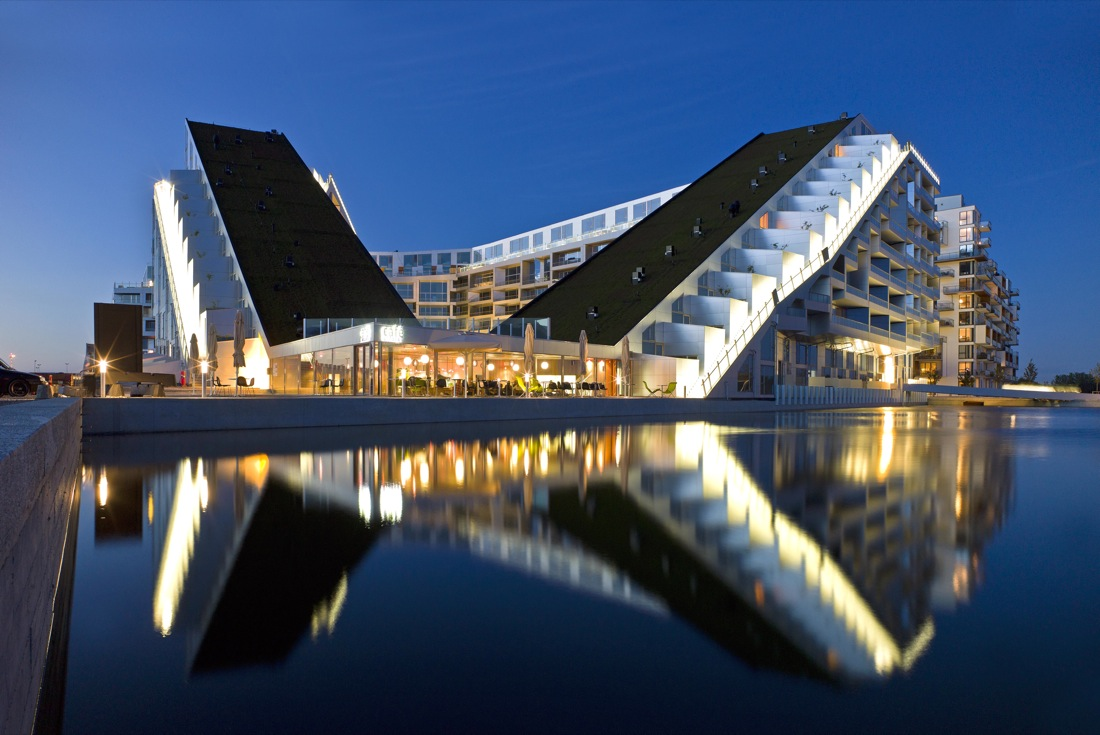
8 House, Ørestad

8 House (Danish: 8TALLET), also known as Big House, is a large mixed-use development built in the shape of a figure 8 on the southern perimeter of the new suburb of Ørestad in Copenhagen, Denmark. Designed by Bjarke Ingels, founding partner of the Bjarke Ingels Group (BIG), the bow-shaped building consists of 61,000 square metres of three different types of residential housing and 10,000 square metres of retail premises and offices. It is the largest private development ever undertaken in Denmark. Commissioned by Store Frederikslund Holding, Høpfner A/S and Danish Oil Company A/S in 2006, it is Ingels' third housing development in Ørestad, following VM Houses and Mountain Dwellings.

== Design ==
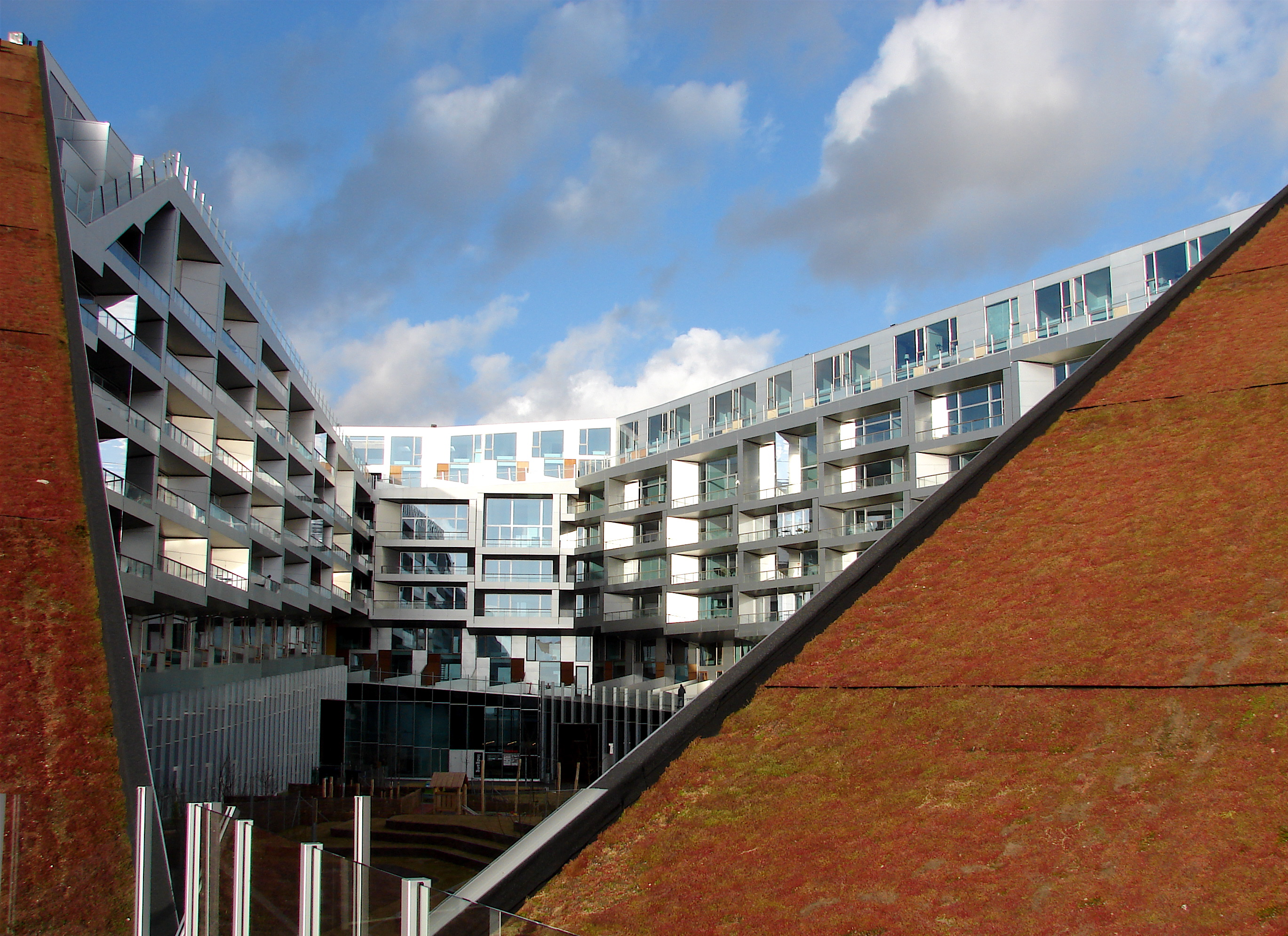
8 House

Referring to his second example of "architectural alchemy", Bjarke Ingels explains his idea "that by mixing traditional ingredients, retail, rowhouses and apartments in untraditional ways, you create added value, if not gold." This is achieved by stacking the various ingredients of an urban neighbourhood into layers. They are connected by a promenade and a cycle track which reach up to the 10th floor, allowing businesses and housing to co-exist.

Thomas Christoffersen, BIG's partner in charge of the project, described the approach in more detail:

The apartments are placed at the top while the commercial programme unfolds at the base of the building. As a result, the different horizontal layers have achieved a quality of their own: the apartments benefit from the view, sunlight and fresh air, while the office leases merge with life on the street. This is emphasised by the shape of 8 House which is literally hoisted up in the northeast corner and pushed down at the southwest corner, allowing light and air to enter the southern courtyard.

The scheme was based on the typology of a perimeter block but was squeezed in the middle to form a bowtie shape with two courtyards. At the centre, there is a 10-metre-wide passage connecting the surrounding spaces, the park area to the west and the channel area to the east. The retail and commercial area at the base consists of a café, a day-care centre and offices, while the living space with houses, apartments and penthouses is positioned above. The sloping, 10-storey building provides views over the fields and marshes of Kalvebod Faelled to the south. The unusual ramp looping around the complex is designed to foster a sense of community, encouraging interaction between neighbours.

== Assessment ==
In granting the 2011 Housing Winner award, the World Architecture Festival jury commented: "The 8 House in the Copenhagen quarter of Orestad is an exemplar project. It combines retail, commercial row houses and apartments in untraditional ways, and its elevated street provides a new level of social engagement."

The American Institute of Architects jury for the 2012 Honor Awards stated:

The 8 House masterfully recreates the horizontal social connectivity and interaction of the streets of a village neighborhood through a series of delightful accessible ramps in a mixed use, multifamily housing project. The skillful shaping of the mass of the facility provides an invigorating sculptural form while creating the ramped "pedestrian" street system and providing full depth dwelling units which are filled with light and views. People really "live" in this newly created neighborhood with shopping, restaurants, an art gallery, office facilities, childcare, educational facilities and the sound of children playing. This is a complex and exemplary project of a new typology.

== Awards ==
- Housing Building of the Year at the 2011 World Architecture Festival.
- The 2012 American Institute of Architects Honor Award for Architecture that recognises achievements that elevate the general quality of the architectural practice.
- The Huffington Post included 8 House as one of the "10 Best Architecture Moments of 2001-2010."
- The best green roof in Scandinavia award," from The Scandinavian Green Roof Association, for "clear and conscious use of the green roof, successfully integrating it into the visual identify of the building."

== Gallery ==
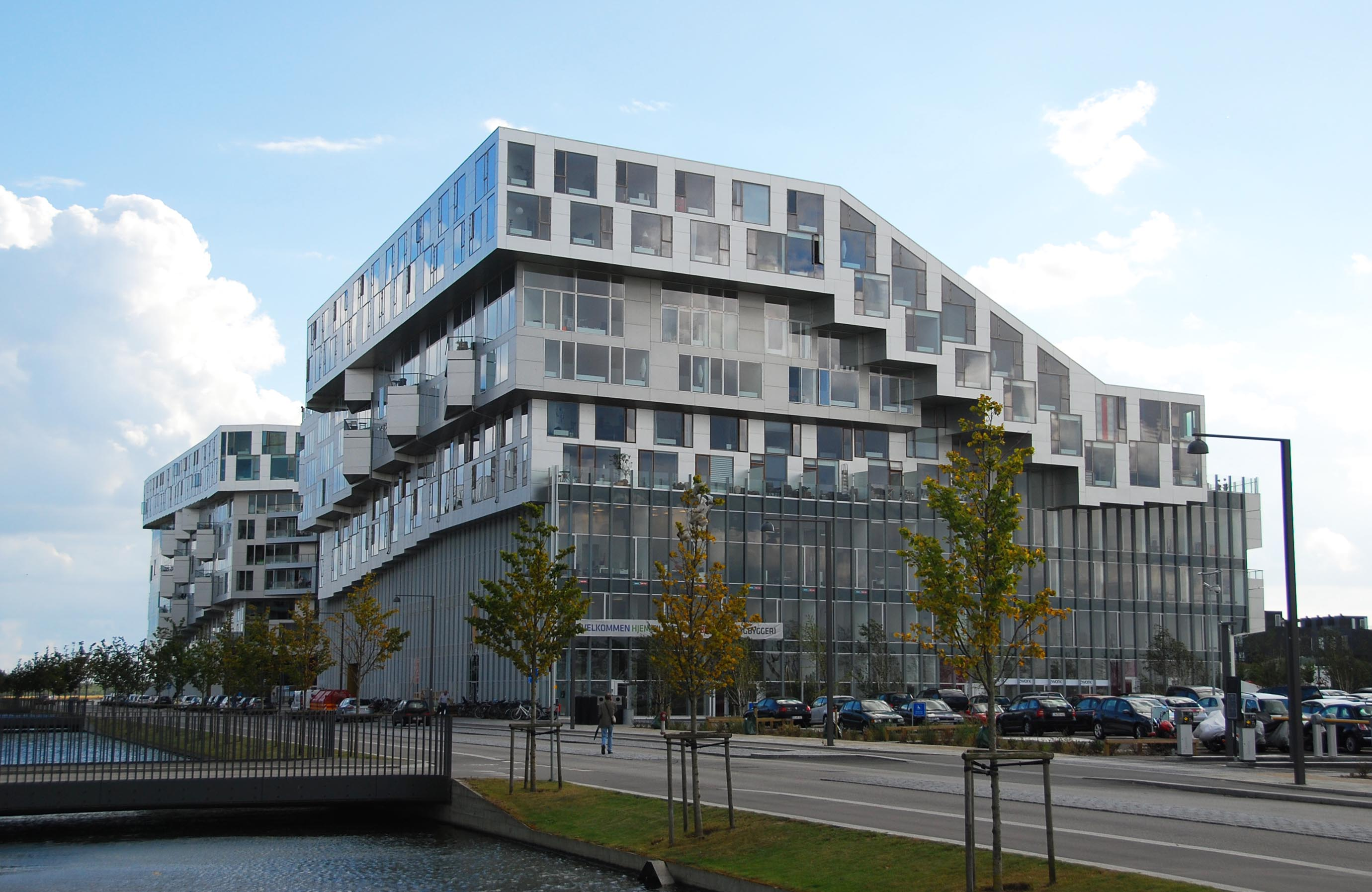

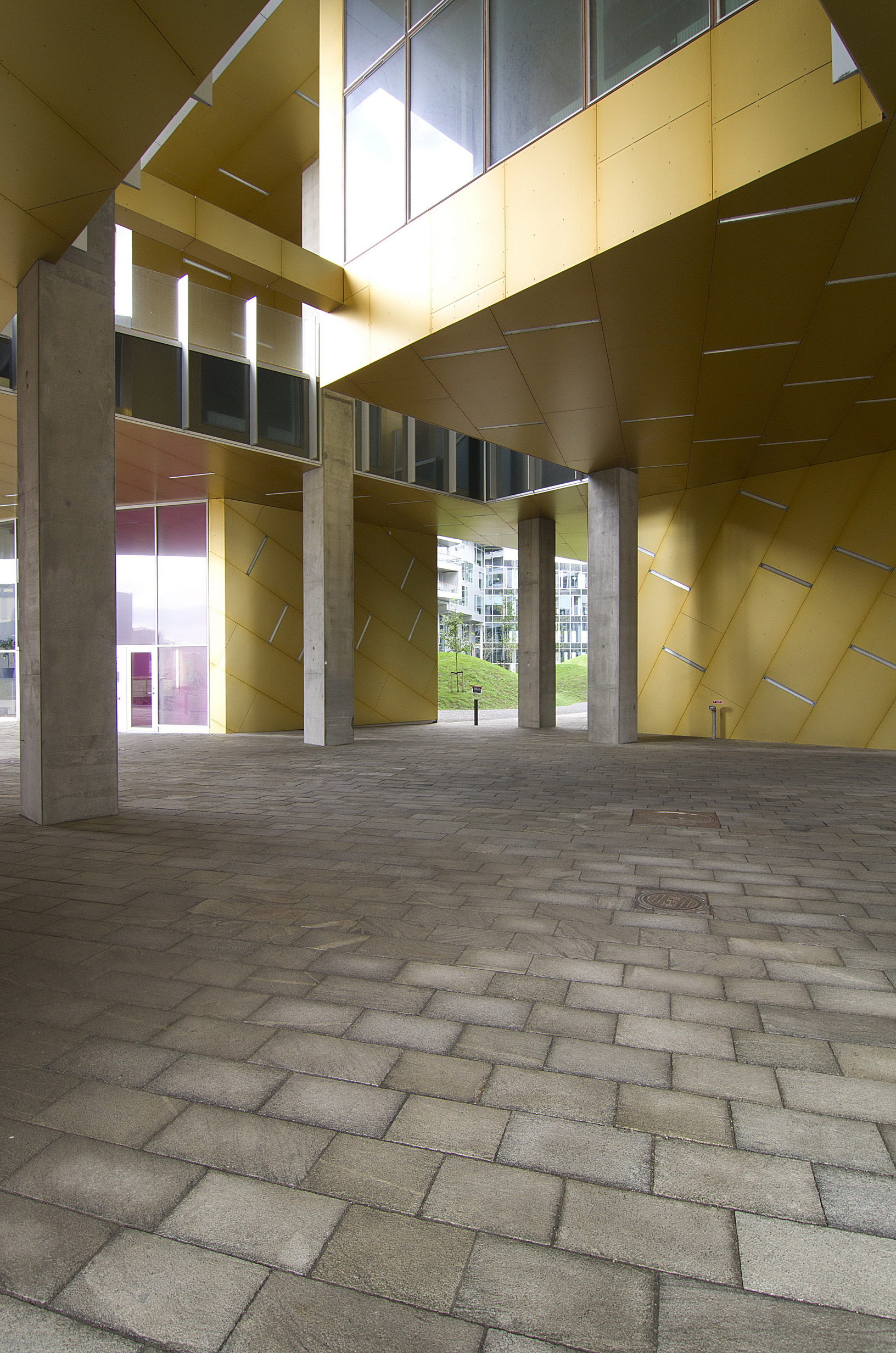

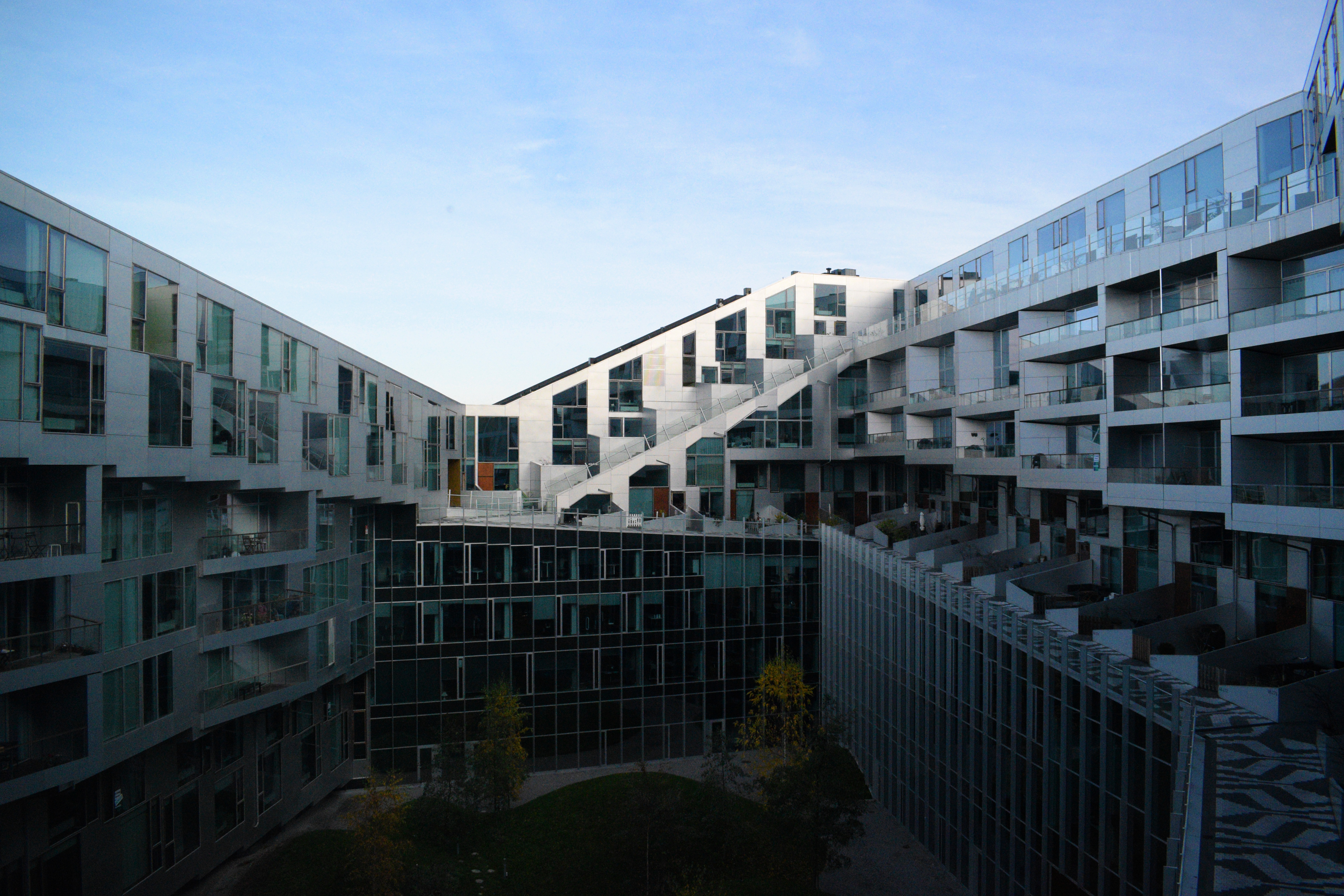

== See also ==
- The Infinite Happiness a feature-length film by Ila Bêka & Louise Lemoine
