= Moonlighter Presents =

Moonlighter Presents is a lecture series based in Brooklyn, New York dedicated to non-expertise and the art of public speaking. Founded in September 2010, the series evolved as a reaction to the increased emphasis on professionalization in academia and the art world. Event organizers invite scholars and professionals to address topics outside their fields of expertise or consider their work from unusual perspectives. There are no topics or themes. Participants are free to invent roles for themselves and to tamper with traditional lecture formatting. Lectures have, for the most part, been held in an old funeral home in Williamsburg. They have also taken place in other non-traditional speaking venues, such as a former Catholic high school in Soho, a bar in Greenpoint, and a corporate office space in Manhattan.

The series has received wide and positive support from the New York Times, Time Out, Bookforum and Bustler. Caitlin Blanchfield, writing for Urban Omnibus, highlighted the uniqueness of the series' anti-curatorial platform:

The series is principally organized by Stephanie DeGooyer and Justin Martin. Previous speakers have included: Bjarke Ingels, Anthony Graves, Peter Coviello, Alexander Nagel, Myranda Gilles, Emily Votruba, Cecily Swanson, Kate Perkins, Ian Balfour, Sukjong Hong, Maegan Magathan, Dan Fox, Molly Kleinmen, Sam Frank, Tyler Rowland, Seppe Kuehn, and Daniel Denvir, among others.
