= Bjarke Ingels =

Danish architect (born 1974)

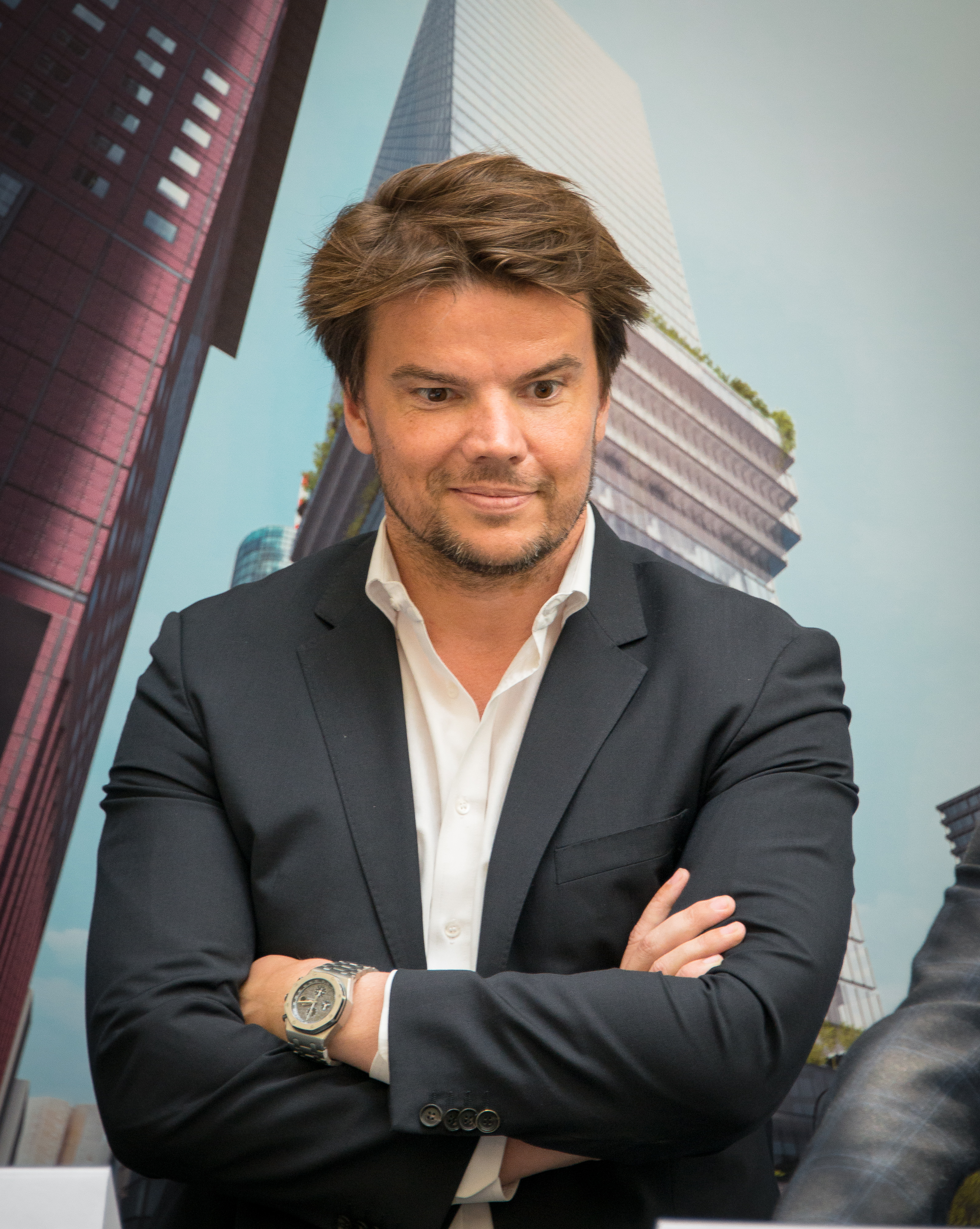
- Ingels in 2015
- Born: Bjarke Bundgaard Ingels; 2 October 1974 (age 52); Copenhagen, Denmark
- Education: Royal Danish Academy of Fine Arts, School of Architecture
- Occupation: Architect
- Practice: Bjarke Ingels Group

Bjarke Bundgaard Ingels (Danish pronunciation: [ˈpjɑːkə ˈpɔnkɒ ˈe̝ŋˀl̩s]; born 2 October 1974) is a Danish architect, founder and creative partner of Bjarke Ingels Group (BIG).

In Denmark, Ingels became well known after designing two housing complexes in Ørestad: VM Houses and Mountain Dwellings. In 2006 he founded Bjarke Ingels Group, which grew to a staff of 400 by 2015, with noted projects including the 8 House housing complex, VIA 57 West in Manhattan, the Google North Bayshore headquarters (co-designed with Thomas Heatherwick), the Superkilen park, and the Amager Resource Center (ARC) waste-to-energy plant – the latter which incorporates both a ski slope and climbing wall on the building exterior.

Since 2009, Ingels has won numerous architectural competitions. He moved to New York City in 2012, where in addition to the VIA 57 West, BIG won a design contest after Hurricane Sandy for improving Manhattan's flood resistance.

In 2011, The Wall Street Journal named Ingels Innovator of the Year for architecture, and in 2016 Time named him one of the 100 Most Influential People.

== Early life and background ==
Ingels was born in Copenhagen in 1974. His father is an engineer and his mother is a dentist. Hoping to become a cartoonist, he began studying architecture in 1993 at the Royal Danish Academy of Fine Arts, thinking it would help him improve his drawing skills. After several years, he began an earnest interest in architecture. He continued his studies at the Escola Tècnica Superior d'Arquitectura in Barcelona, and returned to Copenhagen to receive his diploma in 1999. As a third-year student in Barcelona, he set up his first practice and won his first competition.

Alongside his architectural practice, Ingels has been a visiting professor at the Rice University School of Architecture, the Harvard Graduate School of Design, the Columbia University Graduate School of Architecture, Planning and Preservation, and most recently, the Yale School of Architecture.

== Career ==
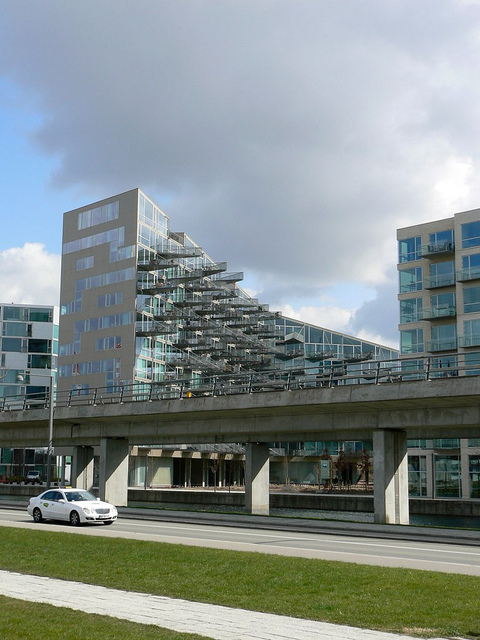
VM Houses in Ørestad, Denmark

=== 1998–2005 ===
From 1998 to 2001, Ingels worked for Rem Koolhaas at the Office for Metropolitan Architecture in Rotterdam. In 2001, he returned to Copenhagen to set up the architectural practice PLOT together with Belgian OMA colleague Julien de Smedt. The company received national and international attention for their inventive designs. They were awarded a Golden Lion at the Venice Biennale of Architecture in 2004 for a proposal for a new music house for Stavanger, Norway.

PLOT completed a 2,500 m^{2} (27,000 sq ft) series of five open-air swimming pools, Islands Brygge Harbour Bath, on the Copenhagen Harbour front with special facilities for children in 2003. They also completed Maritime Youth House, a sailing club and a youth house at Sundby Harbour, Copenhagen.

The first major achievement for PLOT was the award-winning VM Houses in Ørestad, Copenhagen, in 2005. Inspired by Le Corbusier's Unité d'Habitation concept, they designed two residential blocks, in the shape of the letters V and M (as seen from the sky); the M House with 95 units, was completed in 2004, and the V House, with 114 units, in 2005. The design places strong emphasis on daylight, privacy and views. Rather than looking over the neighboring building, all of the apartments have diagonal views of the surrounding fields. Corridors are short and bright, rather like open bullet holes through the building. There are some 80 different types of apartment in the complex, adaptable to individual needs. The building garnered Ingels and Smedt the Forum AID Award for the best building in Scandinavia in 2006. Ingels lived in the complex until 2008 when he moved into the adjacent Mountain Dwellings.

In 2005, Ingels also completed the Helsingør Psychiatric Hospital in Helsingør, a hospital which is shaped like a snowflake. Each room of the hospital was specially designed to have a view, with two groups of rooms facing the lake, and one group facing the surrounding hills.

=== 2006–2008 ===
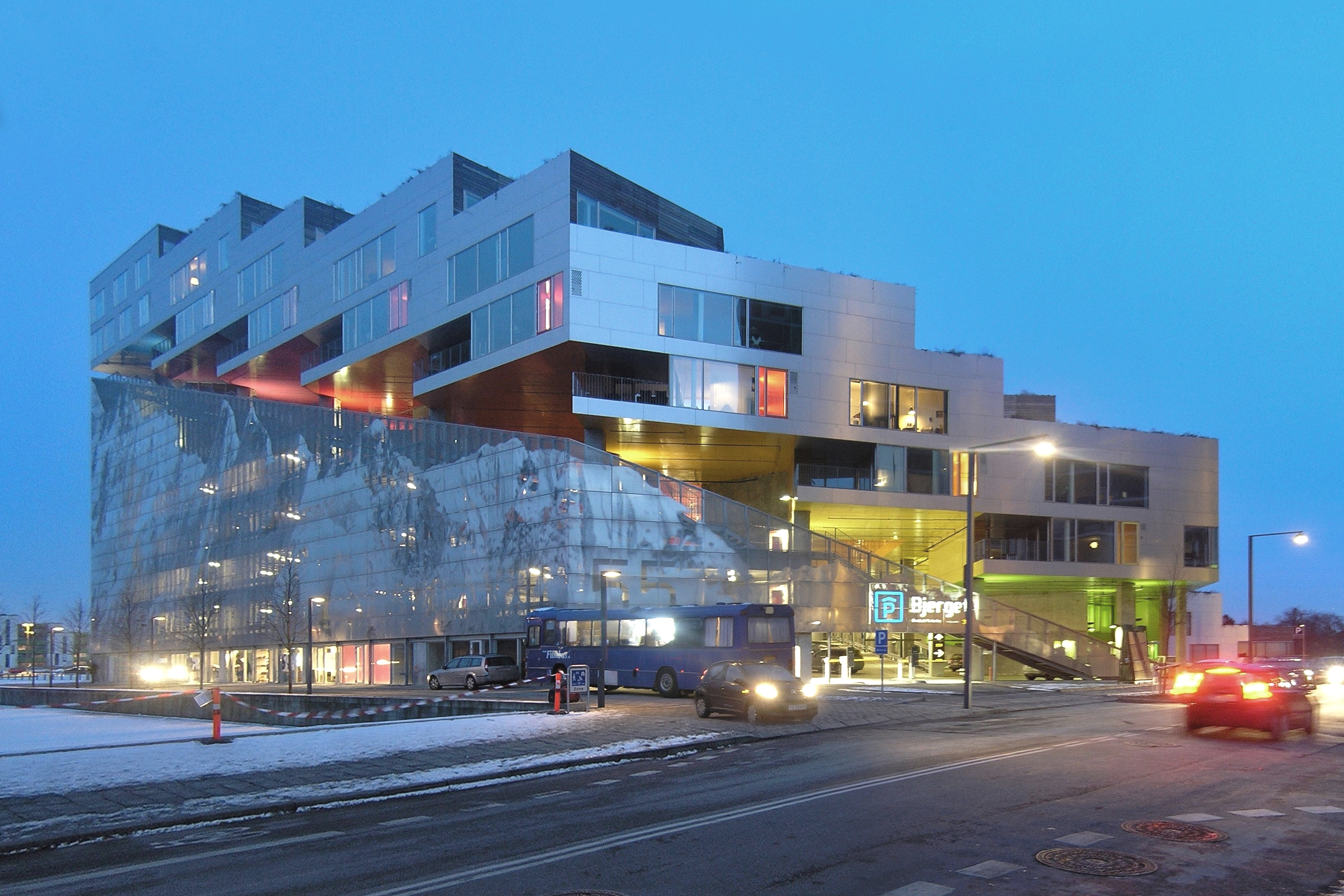
Mountain Dwellings

After PLOT was disbanded at the end of 2005, in January 2006 Ingels made Bjarke Ingels Group (BIG) its own company. It grew to 400 employees by 2016.

BIG began working on the 25-metre-high (82 ft) Mountain Dwellings on the VM houses site in the Ørestad district of Copenhagen, combining 10,000 m^{2} (110,000 sq ft) of housing with 20,000 m^{2} (220,000 sq ft) of parking space, with a mountain theme throughout the building. The apartments scale the diagonally sloping roof of the parking garage, from street level to 11th floor, creating an artificial, south facing 'mountainside' where each apartment has a terrace measuring around 93 m^{2} (1,000 sq ft). The parking garage contains spots for 480 cars. The space has up to 16-metre-high (52 ft) ceilings, and the underside of each level of apartments is covered in aluminium painted in a distinctive colour scheme of psychedelic hues which, as a tribute to Danish 1960s and '70s furniture designer Verner Panton, are all exact matches of the colours he used in his designs. The colours move, symbolically, from green for the earth over yellow, orange, dark orange, hot pink, purple to bright blue for the sky. The northern and western facades of the parking garage depict a 3,000 m^{2} (32,000 sq ft) photorealistic mural of Himalayan peaks. The parking garage is protected from wind and rain by huge shiny aluminium plates, perforated to let in light and allow for natural ventilation. By controlling the size of the holes, the sheeting was transformed into the giant rasterized image of Mount Everest. Completed in October 2008, it received the World Architecture Festival Housing Award (2008), Forum AID Award (2009) and the MIPIM Residential Development Award at Cannes (2009). Dwell magazine has stated that the Mountain Dwellings "stand as a beacon for architectural possibility and stylish multifamily living in a dense, design-savvy city."

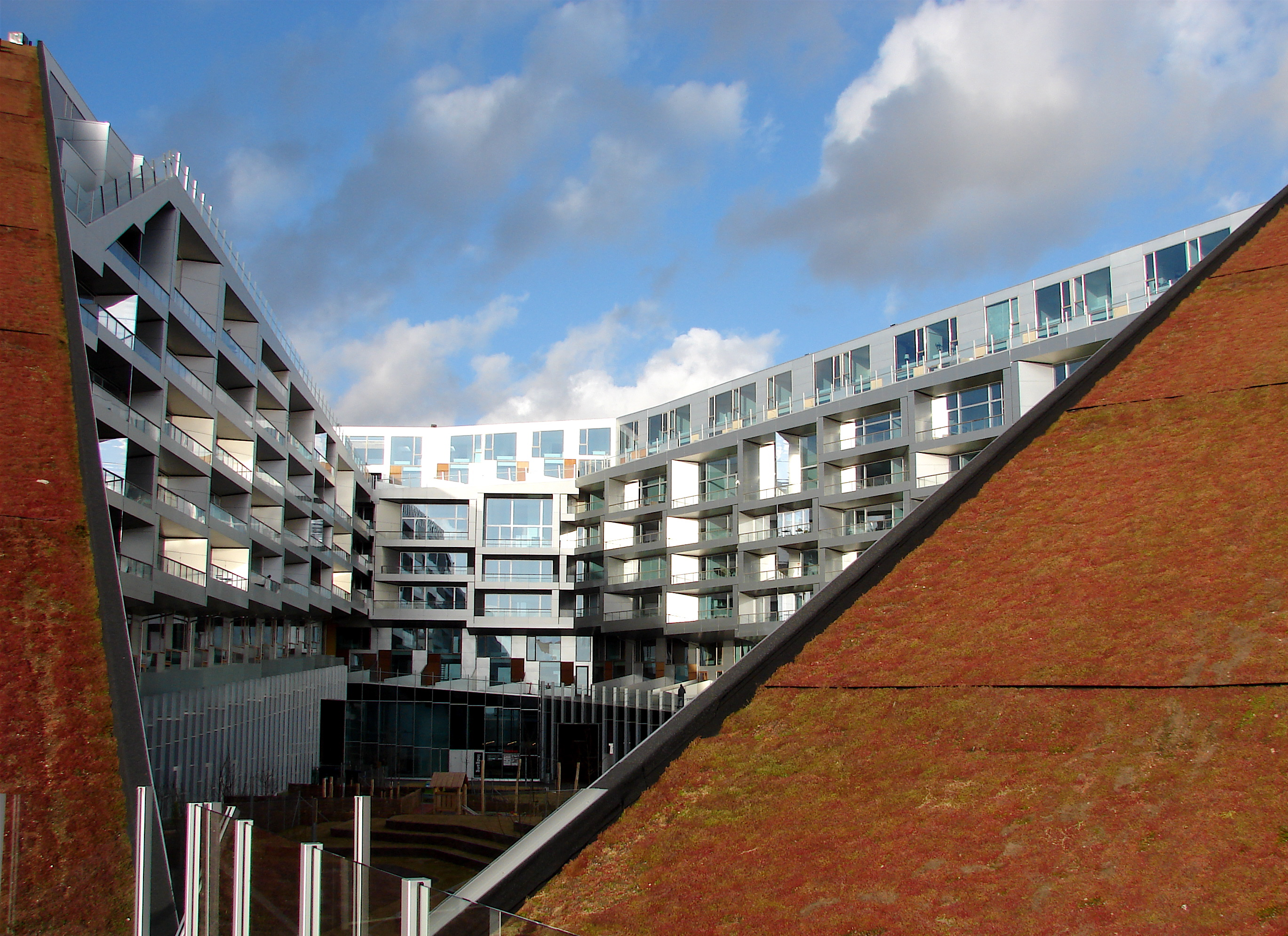
8 House

Their third housing project, 8 House, commissioned by Store Frederikslund Holding, Høpfner A/S and Danish Oil Company A/S in 2006 and completed in October 2010, was the largest private development ever undertaken in Denmark and in Scandinavia, combining retail with commercial row houses and apartments. It is also Ingels' third housing development in Ørestad, following VM Houses and Mountain Dwellings. The sloping, bow-shaped 10-storey building consists of 61,000 m^{2} (660,000 sq ft) of three different types of residential housing and 10,000 m^{2} (110,000 sq ft) of retail premises and offices, providing views over the fields and marches of Kalvebod Faelled to the south. The 476-unit apartment building forms a figure 8 around two courtyards. Noted for its green roof which won it the 2010 Scandinavian Green Roof Award, Ingels explained, "The parts of the green roof that remain were seen by the client as integral to the building as they are visible from the ground. These not only provide the environmental benefits that we all know come from green roofs, but also add to the visual drama and appeal of the sloping roofs and rooftop terrace in between." The building also won the Best Residential Building at the 2011 World Architecture Festival, and the Huffington Post included 8 House as one of the "10 Best Architecture Moments of 2001–2010".

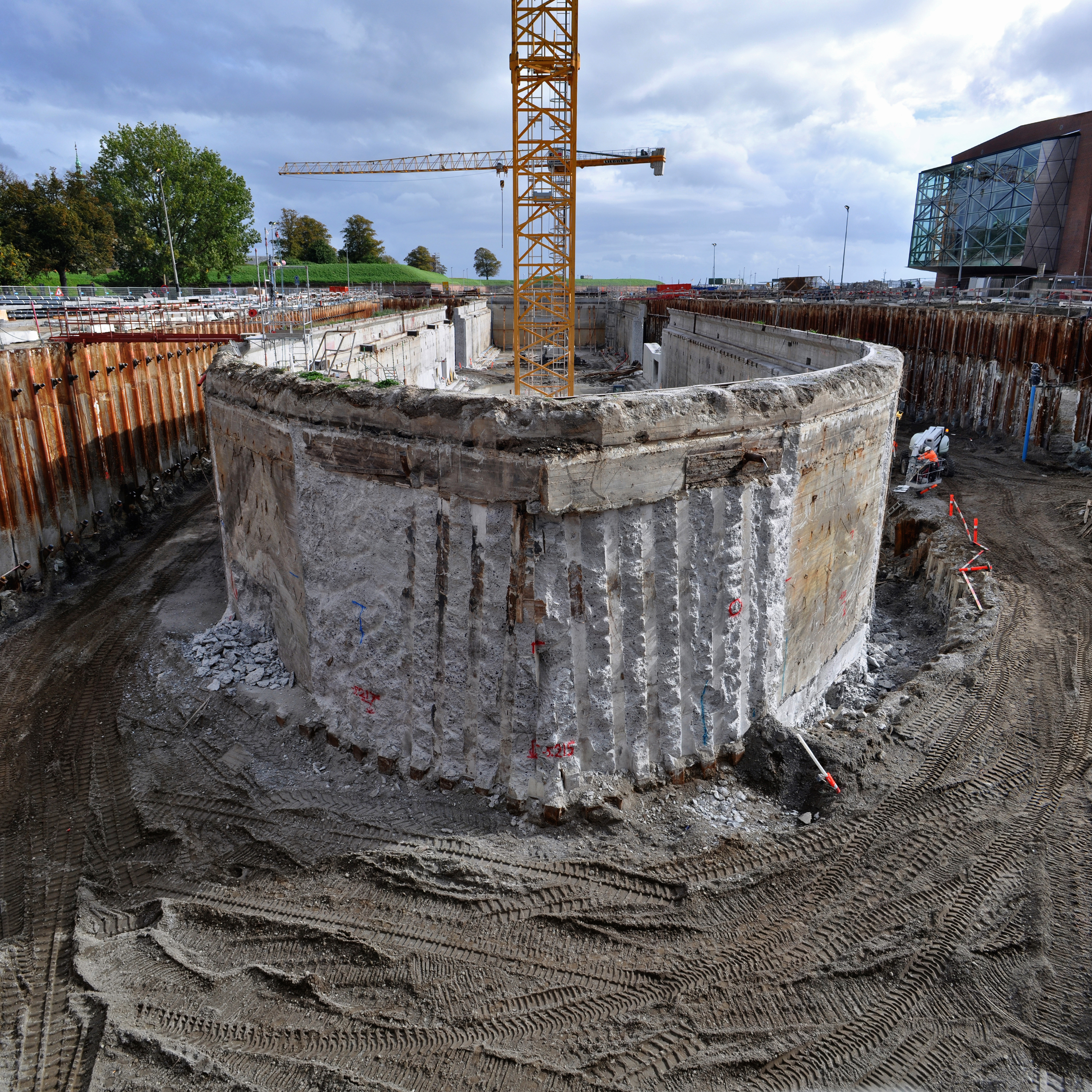
Construction work at the Danish Maritime Museum

In 2007, Ingels exhibited at the Storefront for Art and Architecture in New York City and was commissioned to design the Danish Maritime Museum in Helsingør. The current museum is located on the UNESCO World Heritage Site of nearby Kronborg Castle. The concept of the building is 'invisible' space, a subterranean museum which is still able to incorporate dramatic use of daylight. In launching the $40 million project, BIG had to reinforce an abandoned concrete dry dock on the site, 150 metres (490 ft) long, 25 metres (82 ft) wide and 9 metres (30 ft) deep, building the museum on the periphery of the reinforced dry dock walls which will form the facade of the new museum. The dry dock will also host exhibitions and cultural events throughout the year. The museum's interior is designed to simulate the ambiance of a ship's deck, with a slightly downward slope. The 7,600 m^{2} (82,000 sq ft) exhibition gallery is to house an extensive collection of paintings, model ships, and historical equipment and memorabilia from the Danish Navy. Ingels is collaborating with consulting engineer Rambøll, Alectia for project management, and E. Pihl & Søn and Kossmann.dejong for construction and interior design. Some 11 different foundations are funding the project. Construction began on the museum in September 2010 and it is scheduled for completion by the summer of 2013. In September 2012, the Kronborg and Zig-Zag Bridge components to the building were shipped in from China.

=== 2009–present: international scope ===
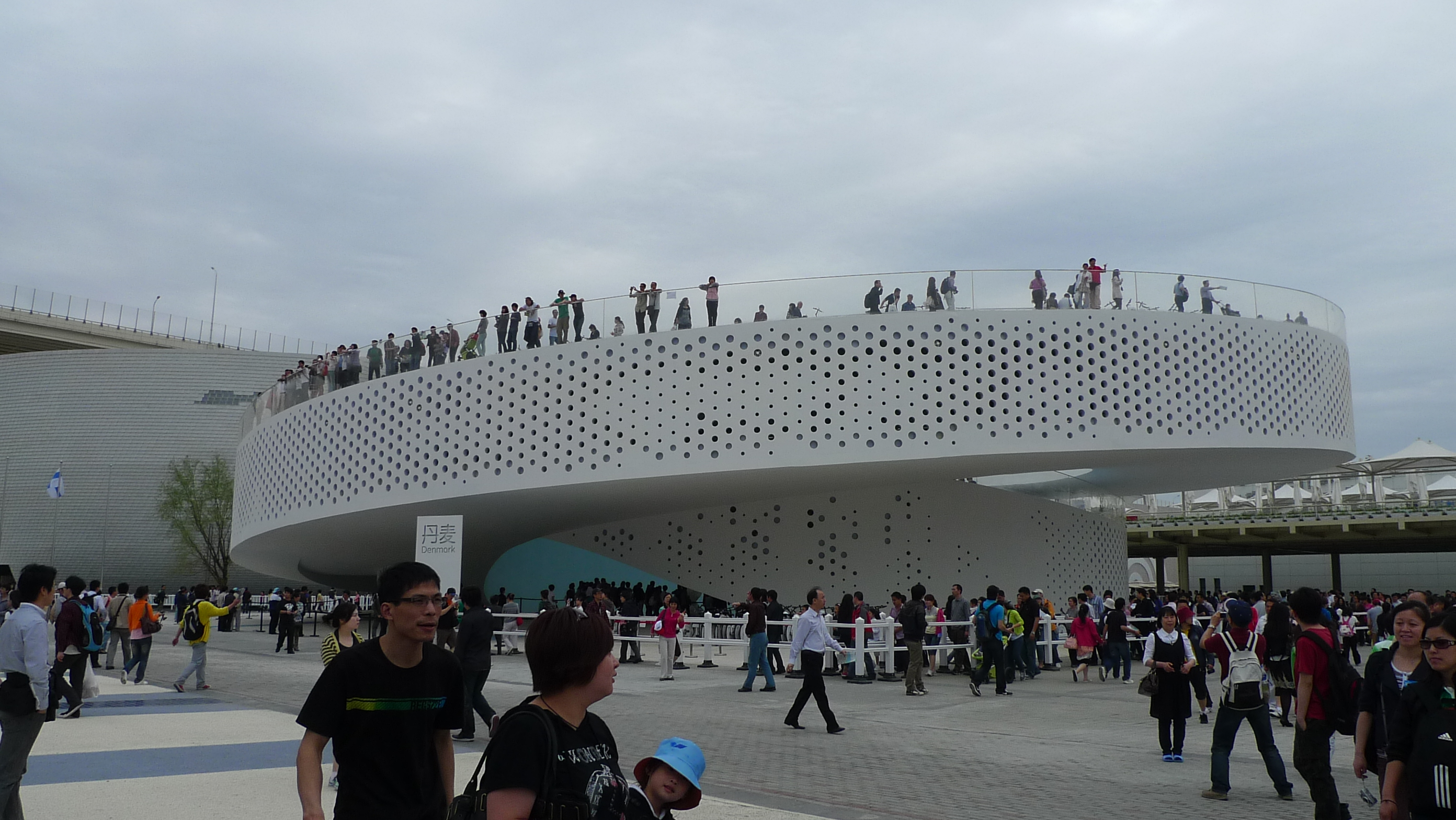
Exterior of Denmark's Pavilion at the 2010 World Expo in Shanghai

Ingels designed a pavilion in the shape of a loop for the Danish World Expo 2010 pavilion in Shanghai. The open-air 3,000 m^{2} (32,000 sq ft) steel pavilion has a spiral bicycle path, accommodating up to 300 cyclists who experience Danish culture and ideas for sustainable urban development. In the centre, amid a pool of 1 million litres (264,172 gallons) of water, is the Copenhagen statue of The Little Mermaid, paying homage to Danish author Hans Christian Andersen.

In 2009, Ingels designed the new National Library of Kazakhstan in Astana located to the south of the State Auditorium, said to resemble a "giant metallic doughnut". BIG and MAD designed the Tilting Building in the Huaxi district of Guiyang, China, an innovative leaning tower with six facades. Other projects included the city hall in Tallinn, Estonia, and the Faroe Islands Education Centre in Tórshavn, Faroe Islands. Accommodating some 1,200 students and 300 teachers, the facility has a central open rotunda for meetings between staff and pupils.

In 2010, Fast Company magazine included Ingels in its list of the 100 most creative people in business, mentioning his design of the Danish pavilion. BIG projects became increasingly international, including hotels in Norway, a museum overlooking Mexico City, and converting an oil industry wasteland into a zero-emission resort on Zira Island off the coast of Baku, Azerbaijan. The 1,000,000 m^{2} (11,000,000 sq ft) resort started construction in 2010, and represented the seven mountains of Azerbaijan. It was cited as "one of the world's largest eco-developments." The "mountains" were covered with solar panels and provide for residential and commercial space. According to BIG, "The mountains are conceived not only as metaphors, but engineered as entire ecosystems, a model for future sustainable urban development".

In 2011, BIG won a competition to design the roof of the Amagerforbrænding industrial building, with 31,000 m^{2} (330,000 sq ft) of ski slopes of varying skill levels. The roof is put forward as another example of "hedonistic sustainability": designed from recycled synthetics, aiming to increase energy efficiency by up to 20 percent. In October 2011, The Wall Street Journal named Ingels the Innovator of the Year for architecture, later saying he was "becoming one of the design world's rising stars" in light of his portfolio.

In 2012, Ingels moved to New York to supervise work on a pyramid-like apartment building on West 57th Street, a collaboration with real estate developer Durst Fetner Residential. BIG opened a permanent New York office, and became committed to further work in New York. By mid-2012 that office had a staff of 50, which they used to launch other projects in North America. In 2014 Ingels's design for an integrated flood protection system, the DryLine, was a winner of the Rebuild By Design competition created by the Department of Housing and Urban Development in the wake of Hurricane Sandy. The DryLine will stretch Manhattan's shoreline on the Lower East Side, with a landscaped flood barrier in East River Park, enhanced pedestrian bridges over the FDR drive, and permanent and deployable floodwalls north of East 14th Street.

BIG designed the Lego House that began construction in 2014 in Billund, Denmark. Ingels said of it, "We felt that if BIG had been created with the single purpose of building only one building, it would be to design the house for Lego." Designed as a village of interlocking and overlapping buildings and spaces, the house is conceived with identical proportions to the toy bricks, and can be constructed one-for-one in miniature. They also designed the Danish Maritime Museum in Elsinore, and a master plan for the new Smithsonian Institution south campus in Washington, D.C. This is part of a 20-year project that will begin in 2016.

Ingels also designed two extensions for his former High School in Hellerup, Denmark — a handball court, and a larger arts and sports extension. The handball court, in homage to the architect's former math teacher, sports a roof with curvature that traces the trajectory of a thrown handball.

In 2015, Ingels began working on a new headquarters for Google in Mountain View, California with Thomas Heatherwick, the British designer. Bloomberg Businessweek hailed the design as "The most ambitious project unveiled by Google this year ..." in a feature article on the design and its architects.

Later in 2015, Ingels was chosen to design the Two World Trade Center, the complement to the completed One World Trade Center on the site of the former Twin Towers. The developer, Larry Silverstein, identified possible tenants News Corporation and 21st Century Fox to create a joint headquarters, switching away from the original British design firm Foster and Partners and signing BIG for a new design. However, this would have required changes to the foundation which was already in place, and Silverstein returned to Foster and Partners in 2020. After this, development stalled for several years. In February 2026, American Express announced an agreement with Silverstein, planning to relocate their headquarters as the sole owner of the tower with an estimated completion in 2031. The updated design from 2022 by Foster and Partners is different from both their original plan from 2006 and the BIG design, but includes a similar shape and terraces to those proposed by BIG in 2015.

Ingels was considered for the Hudsons Yard project. In late 2016, the project became official.

In June 2017. the Tirpitz Museum was opened alongside an old Nazi bunker in the Varde Municipality on the west coast of Jutland.

In May 2022, the Bjarke Ingels Group won the competition for designing the Vitava Philarmonic Hall in Prague, Czechia. It will house three halls as well as a hib of the Municipal Library of Prague.

== Other projects ==
In 2009, Ingels became a co-founder of the KiBiSi design group, together with Jens Martin Skibsted and Lars Larsen. With its focus on urban mobility, architectural illumination and personal electronics, the company designs bicycles, furniture, household objects and aircraft, becoming one of Scandinavia's most influential design groups. KiBiSi designed the furniture for Ingels' Danish Pavilion at EXPO 2010.

Ingels's first book, Yes Is More: An Archicomic on Architectural Evolution, catalogued 30 projects from his practice. Designed in the form of a comic book, which he believed was the best way to tell stories about architecture, he later said that the medium contributed to the perception that some of his projects are cartoonish. A sequel, Hot to Cold: An Odyssey of Architectural Adaptation, explored 60 case studies through a climatic lens, to examine where and how people live on the planet, working from the warmest regions to the coldest. The book was designed by Grammy Award-winning designer Stefan Sagmeister, and accompanied by an exhibition of the same name at the National Building Museum in Washington D.C. The book featured well known projects such as VIA (West 57th), Amager Bakke, 8 House, Gammel Hellerup High School, Superkilen, The Lego House and the Danish Maritime Museum, amongst others.

In 2009, Ingels spoke at a TED event in Oxford, UK. He presented the case study "Hedonistic sustainability" in a workshop on managing complexity at the 3rd International Holcim Forum 2010 in Mexico City, and was a member of the Holcim Awards regional jury for Europe in 2011.

In 2015, a division of the Kohler Company, Kallista, released a new line of bath and kitchen products designed by Ingels. Named "taper", the fixtures featured minimalist and mid-century Danish design.

In 2016, he was a keynote speaker at the leadership conference Aarhus Symposium, in which he addressed the role of creativity and empowerment in leadership.

=== Film ===
Ingels was cast in My Playground, a documentary film by Kaspar Astrup Schröder that explores parkour and freerunning, with much of the action taking place on and around BIG projects.

He was also part of the documentary film Genre de Vie, about bicycles, cities and personal awareness. It looks at desired space and our own impact to the process of it. The film documents urban life empowered by the simplicity of the bicycle.

Ingels was profiled in the first season of the Netflix docu-series Abstract: The Art of Design.

== Design philosophy ==
Architecture seems to be entrenched in two equally unfertile fronts: either naively utopian or petrifyingly pragmatic. We believe that there is a third way... A pragmatic utopian architecture.

— Bjarke Ingels.

In 2009, The Architectural Review said that Ingels and BIG "has abandoned 20th-century Danish modernism to explore the more fertile world of bigness and baroque eccentricity... BIG's world is also an optimistic vision of the future where art, architecture, urbanism and nature magically find a new kind of balance. Yet while the rhetoric is loud, the underlying messages are serious ones about global warming, community life, post-petroleum-age architecture and the youth of the city." The Netherlands Architecture Institute described him as "a member of a new generation of architects that combine shrewd analysis, playful experimentation, social responsibility and humour."

In an interview in 2010, Ingels provided a number of insights on his design philosophy. He defines architecture as "the art of translating all the immaterial structures of society – social, cultural, economical and political – into physical structures." Architecture should "arise from the world" benefiting from the growing concern for our future triggered by discussion of climate change. In connection with his BIG practice, he explains: "Buildings should respond to the local environment and climate in a sort of conversation to make it habitable for human life" drawing, in particular, on the resources of the local climate which could provide "a way of massively enriching the vocabulary of architecture."

Luke Butcher noted that Ingels taps into metamodern sensibility, adopting a metamodern attitude; but he "seems to oscillate between modern positions and postmodern ones, a certain out-of-this-worldness and a definite down-to-earthness, naivety and knowingness, idealism and the practical." Sustainable development and renewable energy are important to Ingels, which he refers to as "hedonistic sustainability". He has said that "It's not about what we give up to be sustainable, it's about what we get. And that is a very attractive and marketable concept." He has also been outspoken against "suburban biopsy" in Holmen, Copenhagen, caused by wealthy older people (the grey-gold generation) living in the suburbs and wanting to move into the town to visit the Royal Theatre and the opera.

In 2014, Ingels released a video entitled Worldcraft as part of the Future of StoryTelling summit, which introduced his concept of creating architecture that focuses on turning "surreal dreams into inhabitable space". Citing the power of alternate reality programs and video games, like Minecraft, Ingels's 'worldcraft' is an extension of 'hedonistic sustainability' and further develops ideas established in his first book, Yes Is More. In the video (and essay by the same name in his second book, Hot to Cold: An Odyssey of Architectural Adaptation) Ingels notes: "These fictional worlds empower people with the tools to transform their own environments. This is what architecture ought to be ..." "Architecture must become Worldcraft, the craft of making our world, where our knowledge and technology doesn't limit us but rather enables us to turn surreal dreams into inhabitable space. To turn fiction into fact."

== Notable projects ==
For a full list of projects, see Bjarke Ingels Group#Completed projects

- Islands Brygge Harbour Bath, Copenhagen (completed 2003)
- VM Houses, Ørestad, Copenhagen (completed 2005)
- Mountain Dwellings, Ørestad, Copenhagen (completed 2008)
- Danish Maritime Museum, Helsingør, Denmark (u/c, completion mid-2013)
- 8 House, Ørestad, Copenhagen (completed 2010)
- Superkilen, a public park in Copenhagen (completed 2011).
- Amager Bakke, incinerator power plant and ski hill (2017 completion)
- Europa City, an urban development concept in Paris (abandoned)
- Two World Trade Center, a skyscraper in New York City (previously signed)

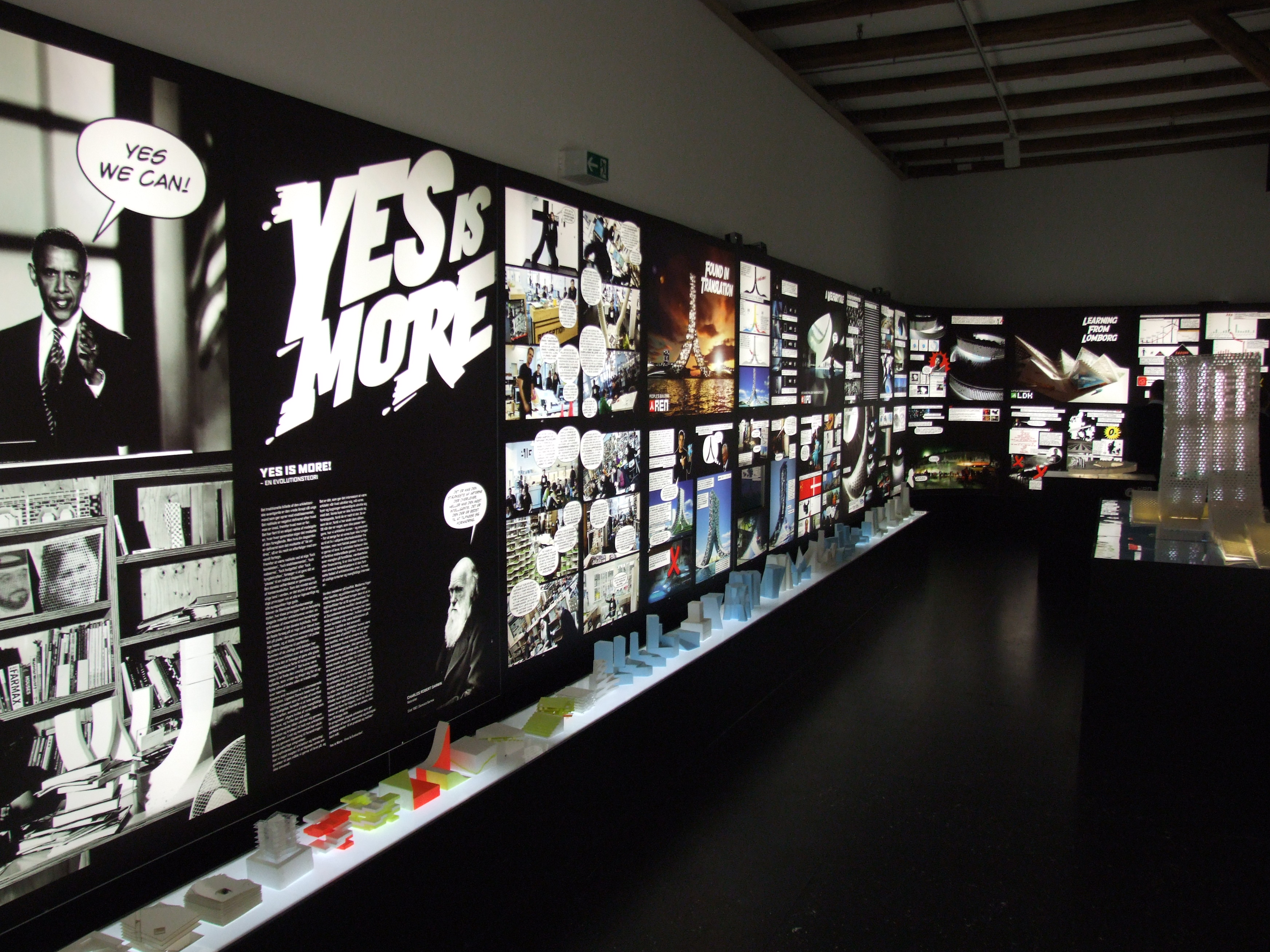
"Yes Is More", Copenhagen, 2009

=== Exhibitions ===
- 2007 – BIG City, Storefront for Art and Architecture, New York City
- 2009 – Yes Is More, Danish Architecture Centre, Copenhagen
- 2010 – Yes Is More, CAPC, Bordeaux; and Wechselraum, Stuttgart
- 2015 – Hot to Cold: An Odyssey of Architectural Adaptation, National Building Museum, Washington, D.C.
- 2019–2020 – BIG Presents Formgiving, Danish Architecture Centre, Copenhagen

== Awards ==
For a more detailed list of awards, see Bjarke Ingels Group#Awards

- 2001 and 2003 Henning Larsen Prize
- 2002 Nykredit Architecture Prize
- 2004 ar+d award for the Maritime Youth House
- 2004 Golden Lion for best concert hall design, Venice Biennale of Architecture (for Stavanger Concert Hall proposal)
- 2006 Forum AID Award, Best Building in Scandinavia in 2006 (for VM Houses)
- 2007 Mies van der Rohe Award Traveling Exhibition – VM Houses
- 2008 Forum AID Award for Best Building in Scandinavia in 2008 (for Mountain Dwellings)
- 2009 ULI Award for Excellence (for Mountain Dwellings)
- 2010 European Prize for Architecture
- 2011 Dreyer Honorary Award
- 2011 Danish Crown Prince Couple's Culture Prize
- 2011 French Academy of Architecture, Prix Delarue Award
- 2011 The Wall Street Journal Architectural Innovator of the Year Award
- 2012 American Institute of Architects Honor Award for 8 House, deemed to elevate the quality of architectural practice.
- 2013 Den Danske Lyspris (for Gammel Hellerup Gymnasium)
- 2013 American Institute of Architects Honor Award, Regional and Urban Design (for Superkilen)
- 2014 European Prize of Architecture Philippe Rotthier (for the Danish Maritime Museum)
- 2014 Urban Land Institute, 40 Under 40 Award
- 2015 Global Holcim Awards for Sustainable Construction, Bronze (for The DryLine resiliency project)
- 2016 Aga Khan Award for Architecture
- 2017 C.F. Hansen Medal
- 2019 The National German Sustainability Award (Deutscher Nachhaltigkeitspreis) Honor Award,

== Bibliography ==
- Bjarke Ingels, Yes Is More: An Archicomic on Architectural Evolution (exhibition catalogue), Copenhagen, 2009, ISBN 9788799298808
- BIG, Bjarke Ingels Group Projects 2001–2010, Design Media Publishing Ltd, 2011, 232 pages. ISBN 9789881973863.
- BIG, BIG – Bjarke Ingels Group, Archilife, Seoul, 2010, 356 pages. ISBN 9788996450818
- BIG, BIG: Recent Project, GA Edita, Tokyo, 2012. ISBN 9784871406789
- BIG, Abitare, Being BIG, Abitare, Milan, 2012.
- BIG, Arquitectura Viva, AV Monograph BIG, Arquitectura Viva, Madrid, 2013. ISBN 9788461655922
- BIG, Topotek & Superflex, Barbara Steiner, Superkilen, Arvinius + Orfeus, Stockholm, 2013, 224 Pages. ISBN 9789187543029
- BIG, Bruce Peter, Museum in the Dock, Arvinius + Orfeus, Stockholm, 2014, 208 pages. ISBN 9789198075649
- Bjarke Ingels, Hot to Cold: An Odyssey of Architectural Adaptation (exhibition catalogue), Taschen, New York and Köln, 2015, 712 pages. ISBN 9783836557399
