= Forum AID Award =

Nordic architecture award

- Description: Nordic award for Architecture, Interior Design, and Design
- Country: Sweden (Host), Nordic countries (Eligibility)
- Presented by: Forum AID Magazine

The Forum AID Award was a Nordic architecture and design award, given annually by the Swedish magazine Forum AID. AID is an acronym for the three subject matters of the magazine—architecture, interior design, and design—and also the three categories of the award. It was given to the designers of the best building, interior design, and design in the Nordic countries that year. The award was founded in 2004, and was presented at a ceremony in Stockholm

The selection process was carried out in two stages. Each Nordic country was represented through its selection committee. The task of the committees was to select the best objects in their respective countries or by their countrymen abroad. The committees chose freely from those objects that had been carried out during the period October 1, to September 30, the year before. The winner was chosen by an international jury.

== A - Architecture ==
=== 2009 ===
Building: Mountain Dwellings, Ørestad, Copenhagen
Architect: Bjarke Ingels Group/Julien de Smedt, Denmark.

=== 2008 ===
Building: Ørestad College, Ørestad, Copenhagen
Architect: 3xN Architects, Denmark

=== 2007 ===
Tautra Maria Convent, Tautra, Norway
Architect: Jensen & Skodvin, Norway

=== 2006 ===
Building: VM Houses, Ørestad, Copenhagen
Architect: Bjarke Ingels Group/Julien de Smedt, Denmark.

== I - Interior design ==
=== 2009 ===
Cristal Bar by Katrin Olina Petursdóttir. Iceland. Client: Zenses

=== 2008 ===
Xile by Mats Karlsson, Sweden

=== 2007 ===
Baron House, Ystad, Sweden Architect: John Pawson Ltd Client: Fabien Baron and Malin Ericson

== D - Design ==
=== 2009 ===
Design: Plopp by Oskar Zieta
Client: Hay. Denmark

=== 2008 ===
Design: Nobody Chair by Komplot Design, Denmark
Client: Hey, Denmark

=== 2007 ===
Design: North Tiles by Ronan & Erwan Bouroullec
Client: Kvadrat, Denmark

== Jury ==
=== 2009 ===
The jury consisted of Chairman Marcus Fairs (the man behind Icon and Dezeen), Manuelle Gautrand, Sean Griffiths and Dirk Wynants.

=== 2008 ===
The jury consisted of chairman Detlef Rahe (internationally renowned architect and designer), Hans Ibelings (editor and publisher of the magazine A10 - new European architecture), Lorraine Farrelly (acting head of the School of Architecture at the University of Portsmouth) and Johan Valcke (one of the founders of Design Flanders).

=== 2007 ===
Deyan Sudjic (chairman), Ellen van Loon, Johanna Grawunder, Patricia Urquiola.

=== 2006 ===
Detlef Rahe (chairperson), Hélène Binet, Peter Cook, Kristin Feireiss, Satyendra Pakhale
