= Julien De Smedt =

Belgian architect

Julien De Smedt (born 1975 in Brussels, Belgium) is the founder and director of JDS Architects based in Brussels, Copenhagen, Belo Horizonte and Shanghai. Projects include the VM Housing Complex, the Mountain Dwellings, the Maritime Youth House and the Holmenkollen Ski Jump.

Prior to founding JDS Architects, De Smedt worked with OMA/Rem Koolhaas, Rotterdam and co-founded and directed with Bjarke Ingels the architecture firm PLOT in Copenhagen.

Among other awards and recognitions, De Smedt received the Henning Larsen Prize in 2003 and an Eckersberg medal in 2005. In 2004 the Stavanger Concert Hall was appointed Worldʼs Best Concert Hall at the Venice Biennale, and the Maritime Youth House won the AR+D award in London and was nominated for the Mies van der Rohe award. In 2009, De Smedt received the Maaskant prize of Architecture, and in 2011 he received the WAN-World Architecture News ʼ21 for 21ʼ Award leading architects of the 21st century. De Smedt has given lectures and been exhibited in numerous locations around the world. His academic contributions include visiting professorships in Rice and Lexington University. JDS Architects released 2 monographs entitled PIXL to XL and Agenda which are distributed worldwide.

== Career ==
De Smedt was born in Brussels. After attending schools in Brussels, Paris, Los Angeles and London, he received a diploma with commendation from the Bartlett School of Architecture in London in 2000. He then went to Rotterdam to work for Office for Metropolitan Architecture (OMA) and Rem Koolhaas.

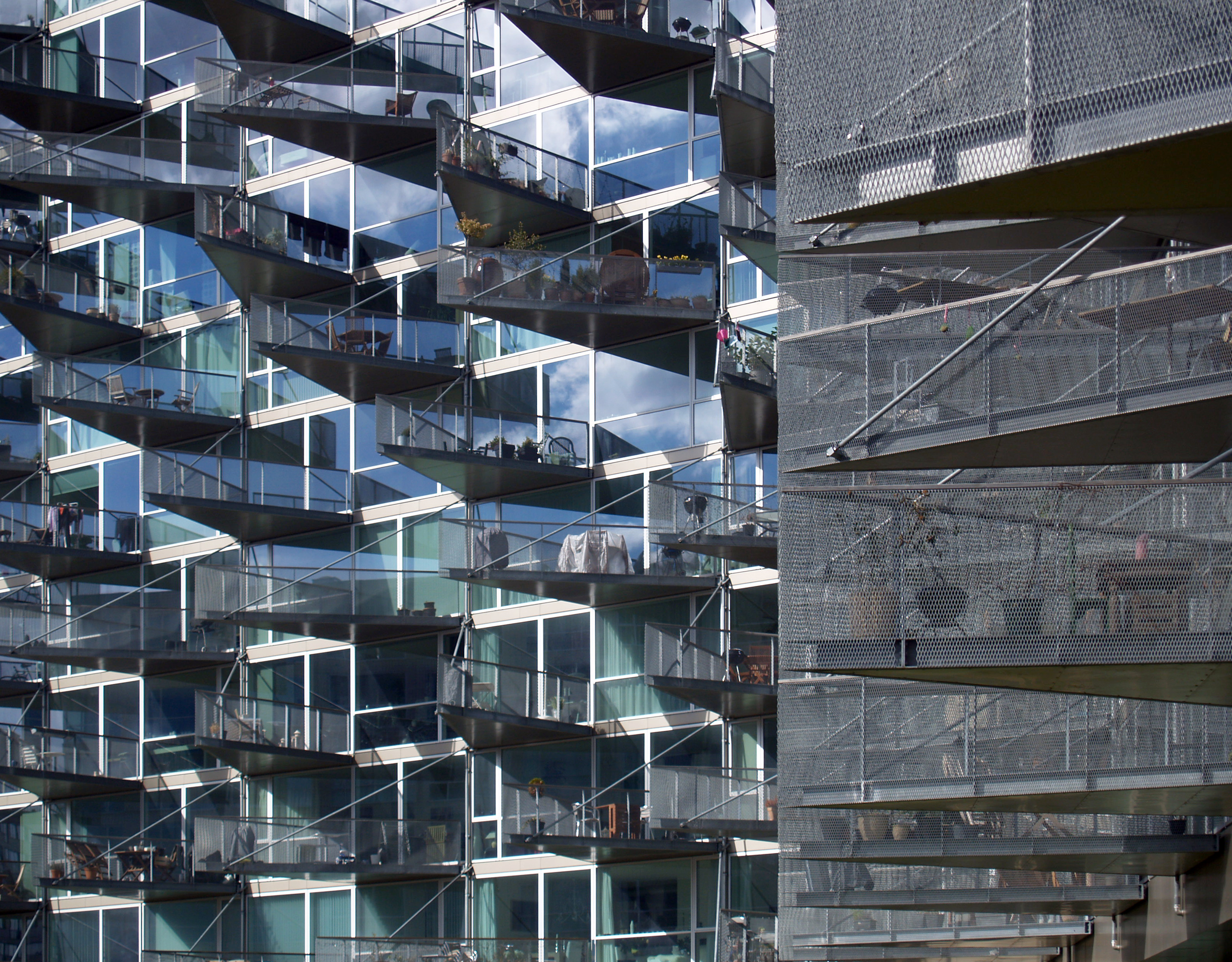
VM housing in Ørestad, Denmark, by Julien de Smedt and Bjarke Ingels

In 2001 he went to Copenhagen to set up the architectural practice PLOT together with OMA colleague Bjarke Ingels. The company fast achieved success and received significant national and international recognition for their inventive designs. This included several commissions and competition wins as well as a Golden Lion at the Venice Biennale of Architecture in 2004 for a proposal for a new music house for Stavanger, Norway. Their first major project to be realized was the award-winning VM Houses in Ørestad, Copenhagen in 2005. In spite of the success and attention, PLOT was disbanded in January 2006 and Julien De Smedt founded Julien De Smedt Architects (often referred to as JDS), while his former partner founded Bjarke Ingels Group.

In 2007 JDS won their first major project with the international competition for the New Holmenkollen Ski Jump in Oslo, one of the city's major landmarks. Other major competition wins include a residential project in the old docklands of Århus, Denmark, and a Harbour development project in Copenhagen.

Since 2013 Julien De Smedt is also board member of Magazine A10. The magazine was established by architecture critic Hans Ibelings and graphic designer Arjan Groot in close collaboration with initial shareholder RSM Group. Currently A10 is published by A10 Publishers, founded by Reinhart Reynders and Benno Savelkoel of RSM Group.

Leading a team that includes collaborators Coldefy, Carlo Ratti Associati, NL Architects, and Ensamble Studio, in 2022, JDS Architects was awarded the commission for the renovation and refurbishment of the Paul-Henri Spaak building of the Espace Léopold complex of European Parliament in Brussels.

== Selected projects ==
- The Wave Harbourfront Development, Copenhagen (competition win)
- Belgian and European pavilion Shanghai expo, China (completed 2009)
- The Beirut house of arts and culture, Lebanon (settled 2009)
- The Encants market, Barcelona (settled 2008)
- Waterfront, Rimini, Italy (ongoing 2008)
- Two Seasons Hotel, Stavanger, Norway (competition win 2008)
- Iceberg Project, Århus Docklands (competition win 2008)
- New Holmenkollen Ski Jump (competition win 2009, completion 2011)
- Mountain Dwellings, Ørestad, Copenhagen (completed 2008)
- People's Building, Shanghai, China (settled 2004)
- The BE Buildings, Brussels (ongoing 2007)
- The Twirl House, Taiwan ( ongoing 2007)
- Headquarters for Sjakket, Copenhagen (completed 2007)
- Mondri and Elano Hotel, Las Vegas (submitted 2006)
- Helsingør Psychiatric Hospital, Elsinore, Denmark (completed 2005/2006/competition win)
- VM Houses, Ørestad, Denmark (completed 2005/ Scandinavian Forum Prize 2006, Copenhagen's Municipality Prize 2006, Mies van der Rohe Prize Nomination 2007)
- The Battery, Copenhagen, Denmark (ongoing 2005)
- Maritime Youth House, Amager (completion 2004, DK, competition win)
- Islands Brygge Harbor Bath, Copenhagen, DK, Completed 2003)
- Hysociety, Copenhagen, Denmark (settled 2003)
- Superharbour, Fehmern Belt, Denmark, Germany (settled 2003)

== Awards ==
- 2013 Architizer A+ Award, Best Sport Venue (for The Holmenkollen Ski Jump)
- 2013 Architizer A+ Award, Best Residential (for The Iceberg)
- 2013 MIPIM Award, Best Residential (for The Iceberg)
- World Architecture Festival Award for Best Residential Building 2008 (for VM Mountain Dwellings)
- 2008 MIPIM Residential Developments Award (for VM Mountain Dwellings)
- Forum AID Award for Best Building in Scandinavia 2008 (for VM Mountain Dwellings)
- 2007 Contract World Award for Best Interior (for Headquarters for Sjakket)
- 2007 IOC Honorable Mention - Islands Brygge Harbor Bath
- 2007 Mies van der Rohe Award Traveling Exhibition - VM-houses
- FORUM AID Award, Best Building in Scandinavia 2006 (for VM Houses)
- 2005 Mies van der Rohe Award- Special Mention (for Maritime Youth House)
- 2004 Copenhagen Award for Architecture (for Maritime Youth House)
- 2004 ar+d award for the Maritime Youth House
- Golden Lion 2004, Venice Biennale (for Stavanger Concert Hall)
- 2003 Scanorama Design Award
- 2003 Henning Larsen Prize
- 2002 Nykredit Architecture Prize
- 2001 Henning Larsen Prize
