= VM Houses =

Apartment buildings in Copenhagen

Coordinates: 55.6342°N 12.5826°E

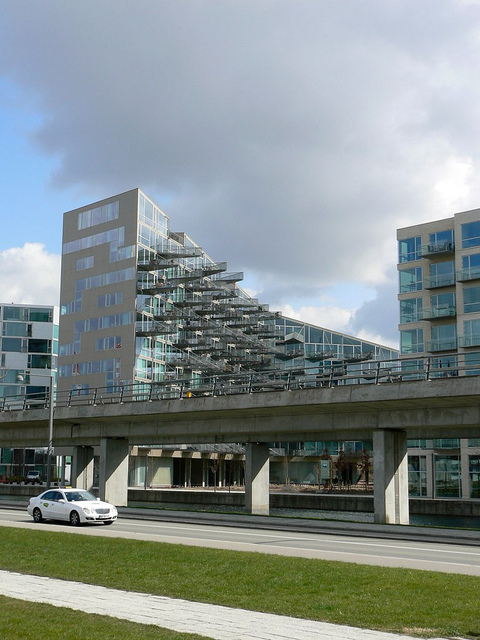
VM Houses, Copenhagen

VM Houses is a housing project consisting of two adjacent apartment buildings in Ørestad, Copenhagen, Denmark. Designed by JDS Architects and Bjarke Ingels Group, the M House with 95 units was completed in 2004 and the V House with 114 units, in 2005.

== Background ==
The developer Per Høpfner, working with the Dansk Olie og Naturgas company -now DONG Energy-, was interested in creating housing in Ørestad on land purchased from the state. Despite the fact that Bjarke Ingels and Julien De Smedt had not built anything on such a large scale before, he decided to commission PLOT, their architecture firm, to design VM Houses. Høpfner's son Peter explained how cooperative Ingels turned out to be, always ready to adapt his plans if the costs were too high. "VM may look crazy," Høpfner remarked, "but it came in on budget." He believes the project's success was due in part to the frequent discussions the architect had with the developer in his role as general contractor. Ingels lived in the complex until 2008 when he moved into the Mountain Dwellings.

== Design ==
Inspired by Le Corbusier's Unité d'Habitation concept, two residential blocks, with footprints in the shape of the letters V and M, have been designed with an emphasis on daylight, privacy and views. Rather than looking over the neighbouring building, all the apartments have diagonal views of the surrounding landscape. Corridors are short, rather like bullet holes through the building. There are some 80 different types of apartment in the complex, adaptable to individual needs.

== Award ==
VM Houses was the first major project to be designed by Julien De Smedt and Bjarke Ingels, winning them the Forum AID Award for the best building in Scandinavia in 2006.

== Gallery ==
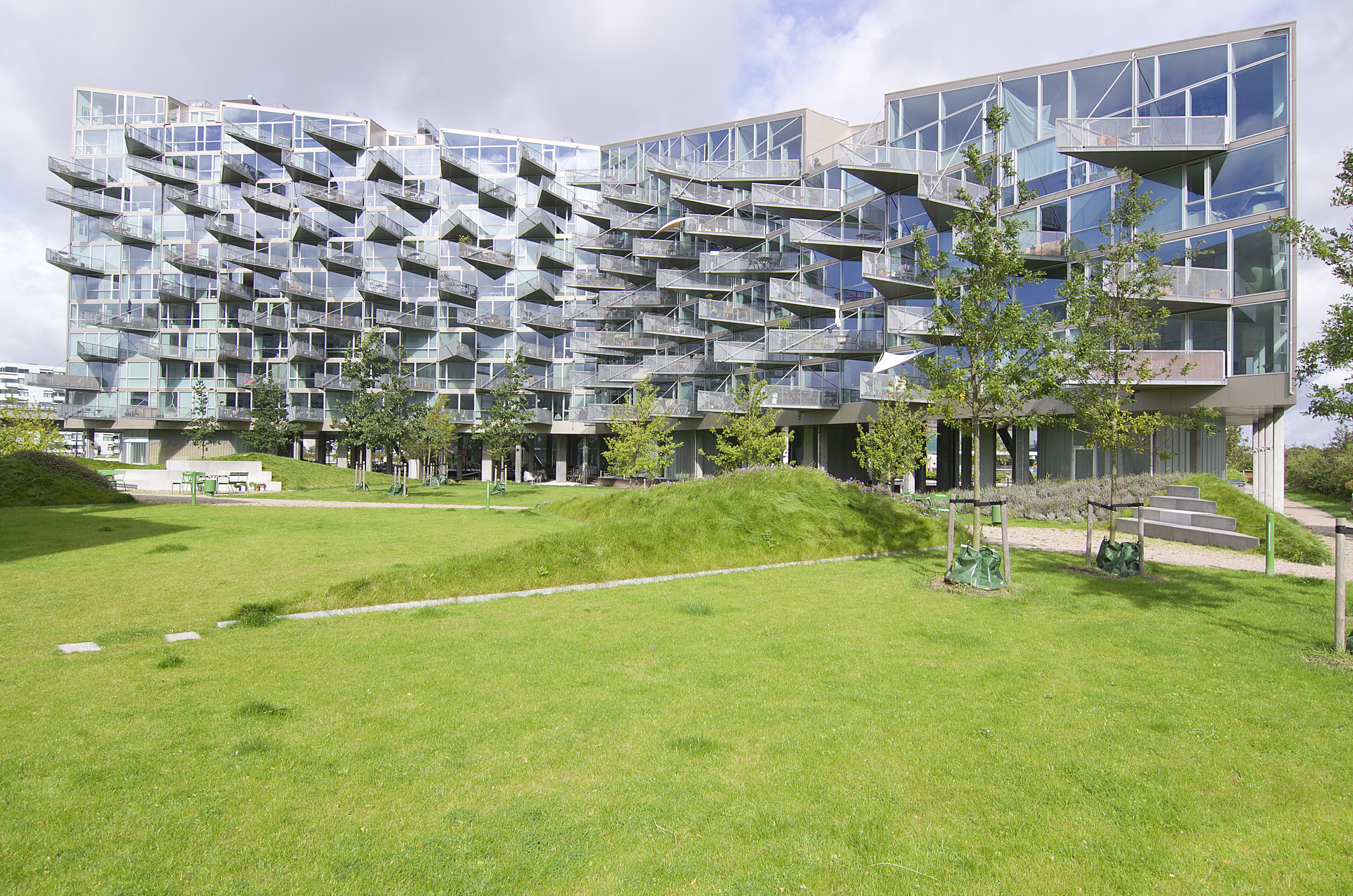

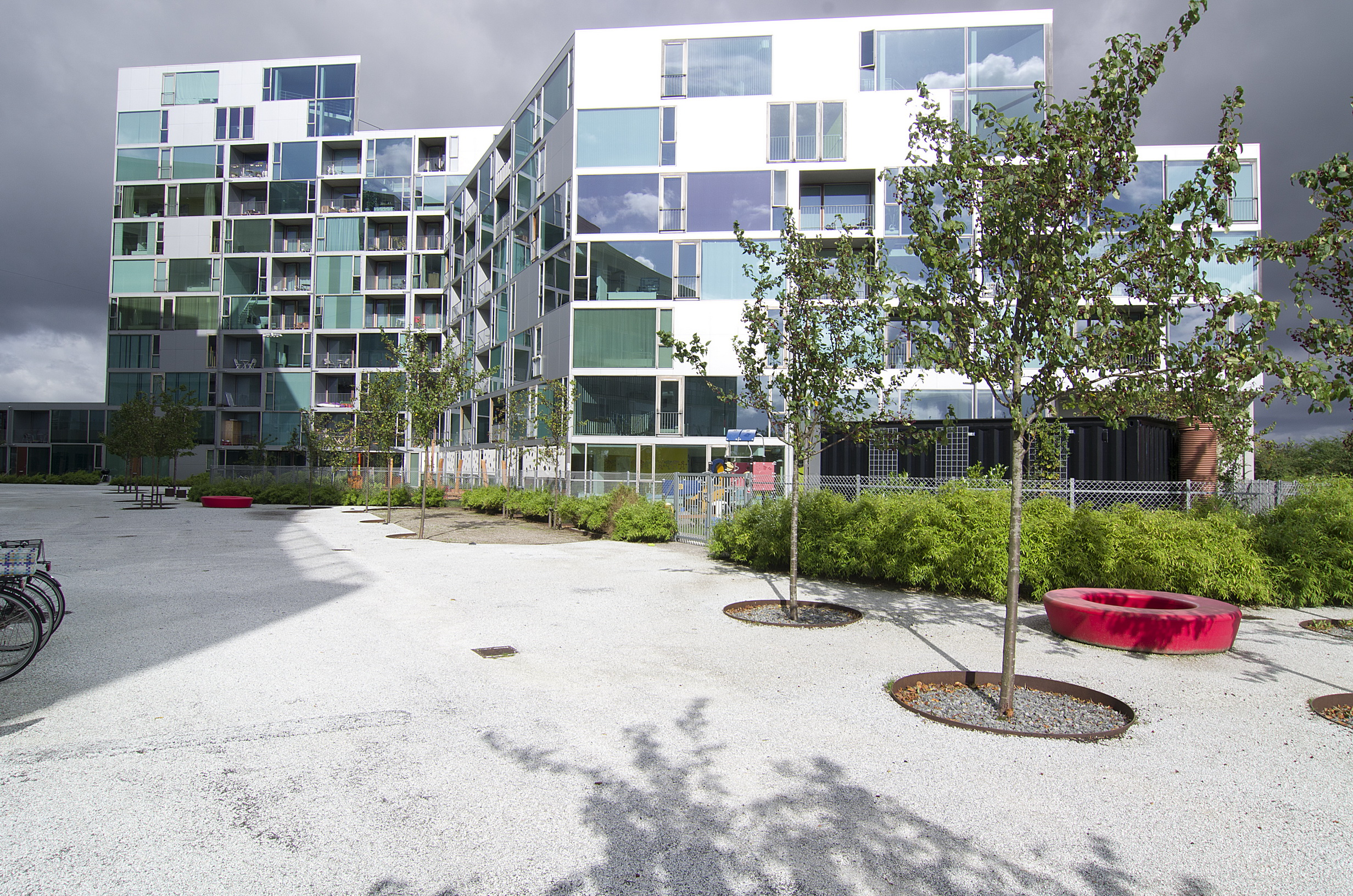

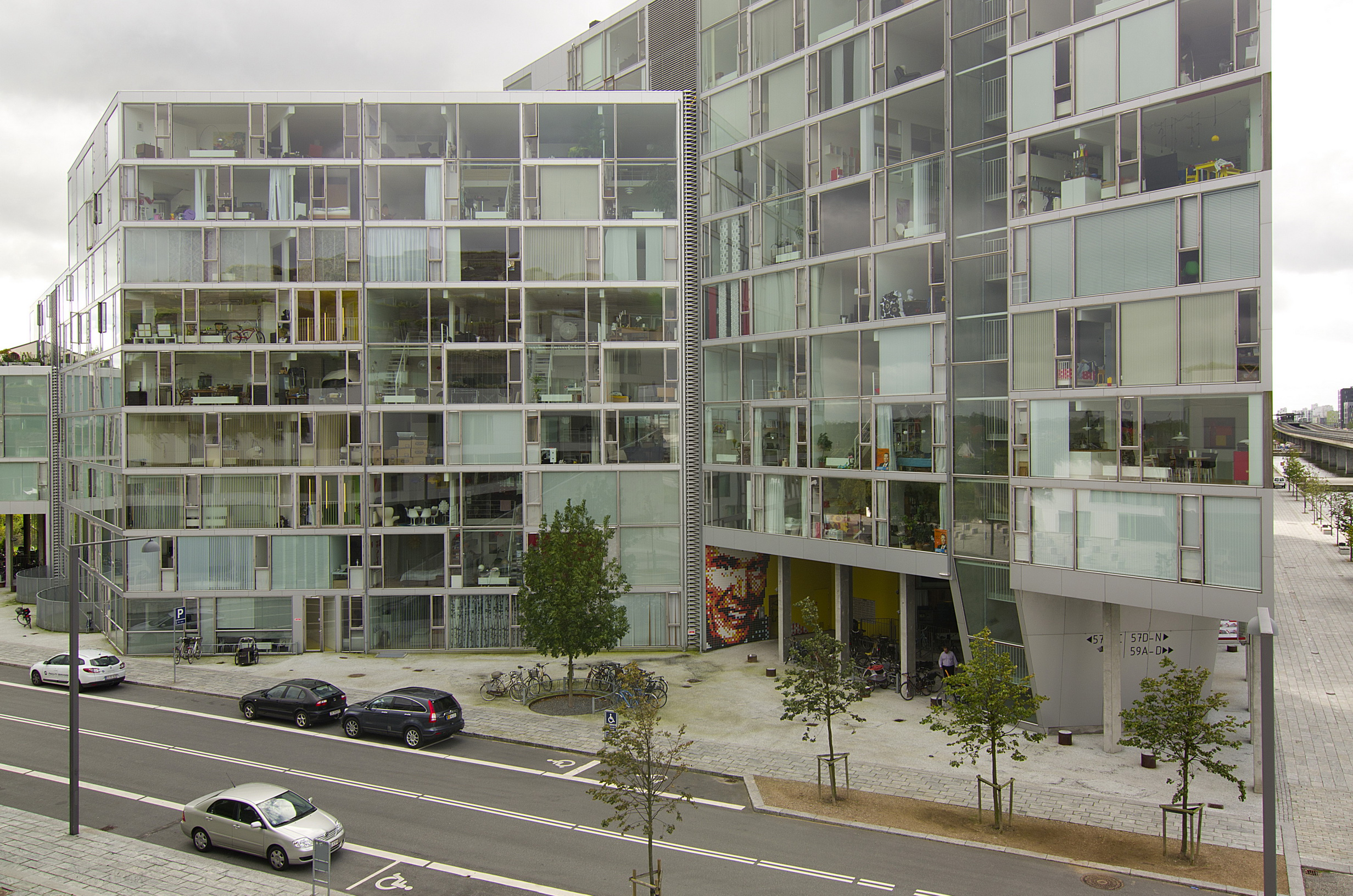

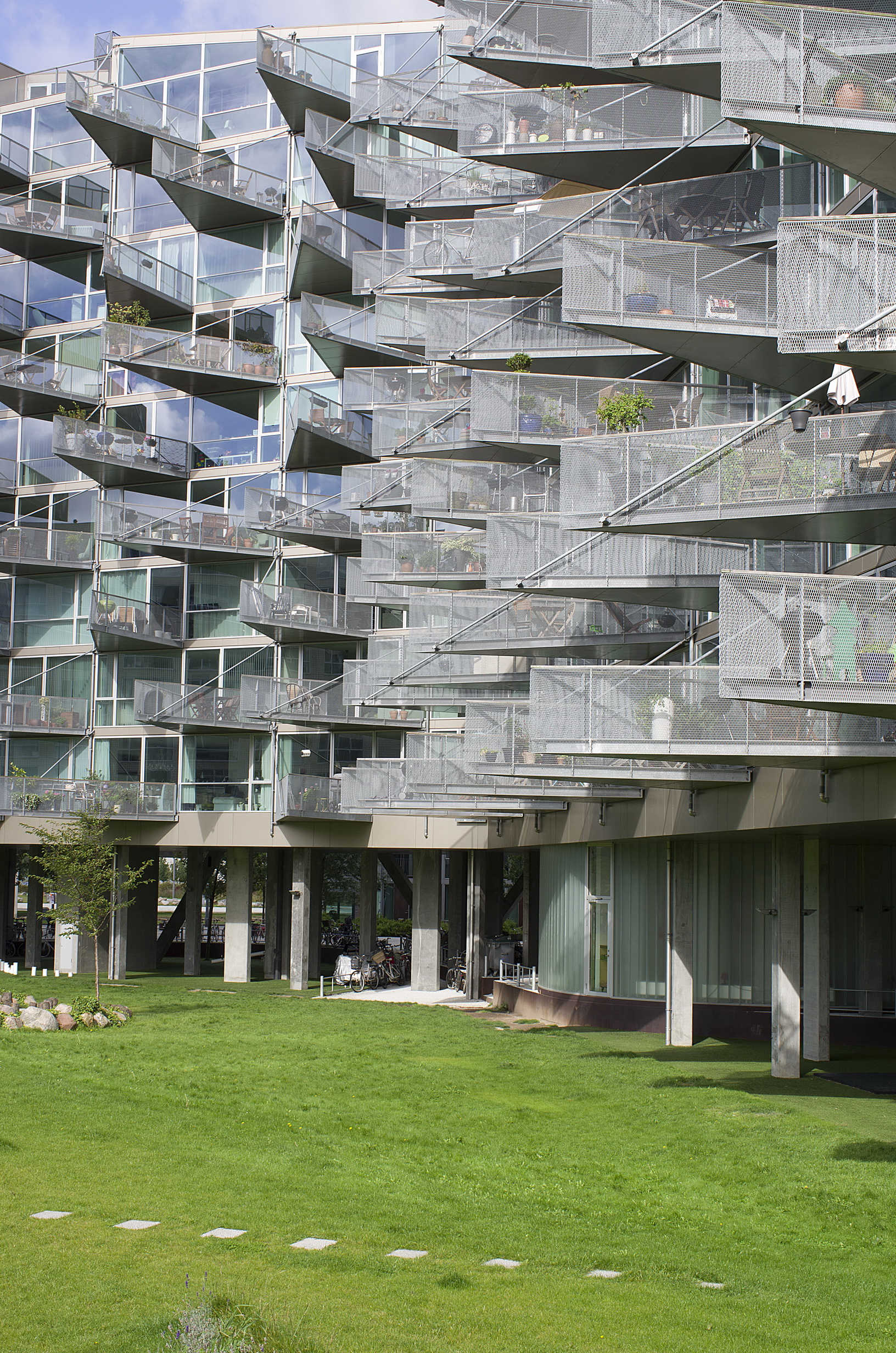
