= Alectia =

Danish consulting company

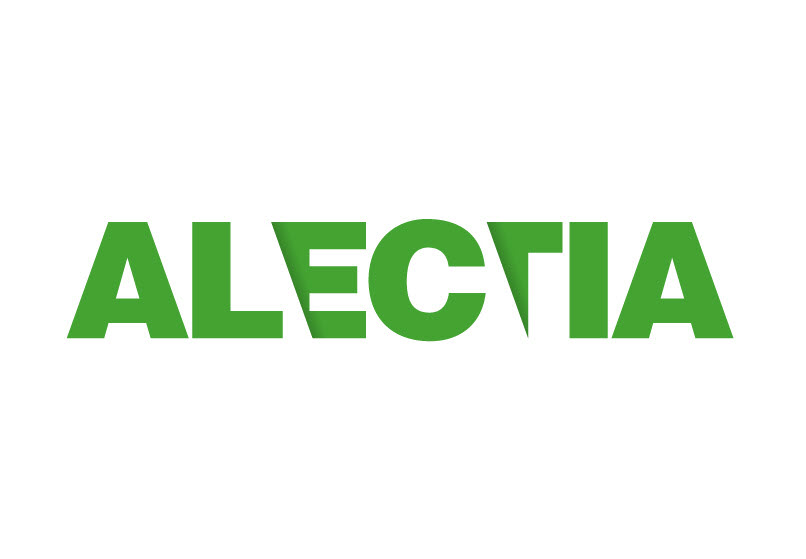
- Type: public limited company
- Founded: 1912
- Headquarters: Virum, Denmark
- Key people: Jesper Mailind, CEO
- Services: Engineering consultancy
- Website: alectia.com

Alectia A/S is a Danish consulting company with approx. 700 employees (2014) and an annual turnover in 2014 of 623 million DKK. The company is owned entirely by the Alectia-Foundation. Alectia is headquartered in Virum with regional offices in Aarhus, Odense and Kolding. In addition, the company has an office in Ascot (UK), and possesses a number of companies outside Denmark.

Alectia is a member of the Danish Association of Consulting Engineers (FRI).

== Strategy ==
Over the years Alectia has developed from a classic engineering company to a knowledge-based company with specialised competences within process technology, occupational health and safety, business consulting, buildings, water, energy and environment.

== History ==
Under the name Birch & Krogboe the company was founded in 1912 as the first consulting engineering company in Denmark. The founders were the two engineers Ludvig Birch and Jacob O. Pedersen Krogboe. In the early years the company dealt primarily with the construction of hospitals and residential buildings, including Gentofte Hospital and Rigshospitalet. Today, Alectia participates in the building projects Urban Mediaspace and Navitas Park, in Aarhus, Odense Research and Knowledge Park and Copenhagen Bio Science Park (COBIS).

In 2008, the company changed its name to Alectia. This was part of a strategic acquisitions process, which took place primarily in Denmark:

- 2005: Danbrew
- 2006: Dansk Arbejdsmiljø and Byggeriets Arbejdsmiljøcenter Danmark
- 2007: Jobliv Danmark, Watertech and MA Project
- 2008: Penborn Technical Services (UK)
- 2009: Maersk Construction and Tano FoodCon Group
- 2011: Logisys and Healthy Company
