= Kalvebod Fælled =

Protected area in Denmark

Coordinates: 55°36′N 12°33′E

Kalvebod Fælled ("Kalvebod Commons"), also known as Vestamager ("Western Amager"), is a scenic area that takes up roughly a quarter of the island of Amager near Copenhagen, Denmark.

The area consists of reclaimed sea bed, with a number of former islets making up small isolated hills; it was dammed and drained during the 1940s to serve as an artillery training range. After active military use ended in 1983, some of the area has been used for transportation infrastructure (motorway and railway in connection with the Øresund bridge), a landfill on the strip between the motorway and the ocean dyke, a golf course and the southern end of the Ørestad urban development. Most of the area, however, lies as lightly maintained parkland featuring a range of nature types, from young forests to tidal marshes; some areas are prevented from developing into forests by grazing livestock and game. After years of preparation the area was finally cleared of unexploded munitions and fully opened to the general public on October 15, 2010. Previously, because of the risk of unexploded munitions, walking outside the paths and roads was generally not allowed. A large area in the southwestern corner is set aside under the Natura 2000-scheme as an EU-recognized bird protection area to which the general public has no access.

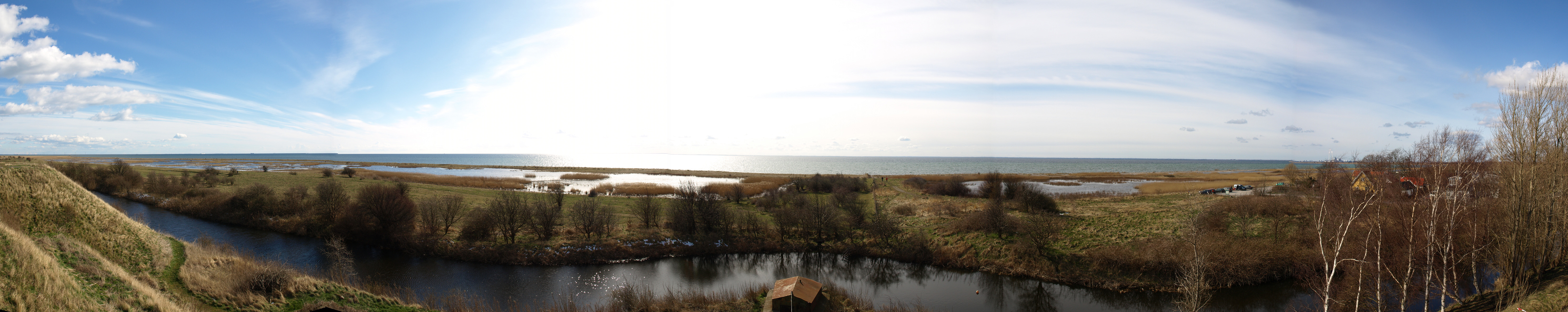
Panoramic view of the Vestamager wetlands, view towards Køge Bugt

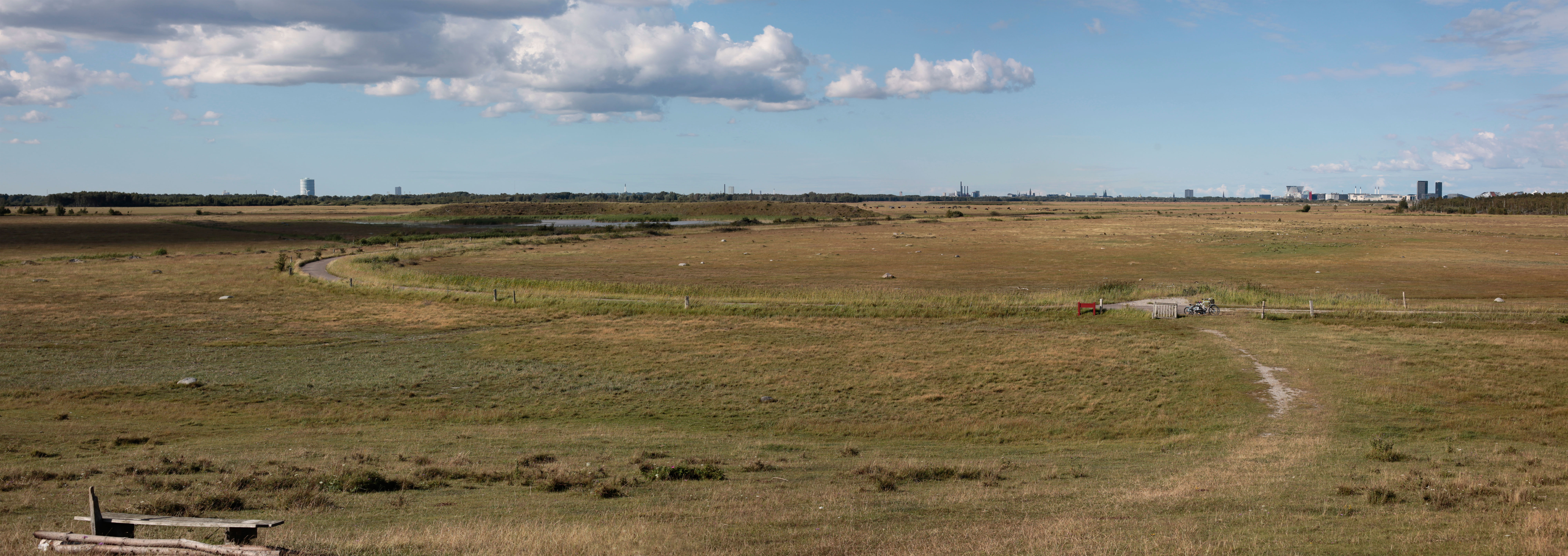
Panoramic view of Kalvebod Fælled towards Ørestad and the City of Copenhagen.
