= Mountain Dwellings =

Building in Copenhagen, Denmark

Coordinates: 55°38.115′N 12°34.975′E

- Bjerget
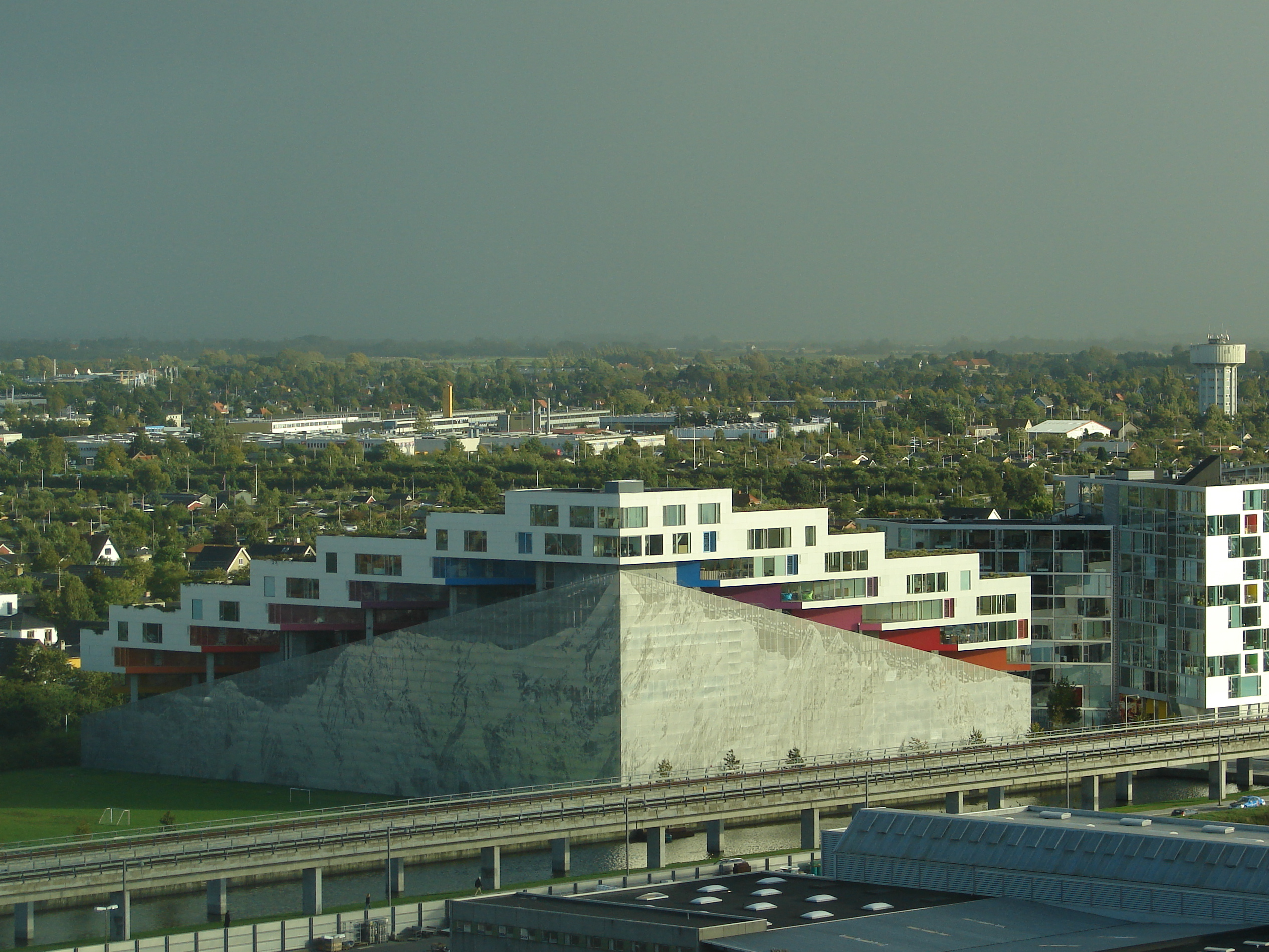
- Interactive map of the Mountain Dwellings area

General information
- Type: residential, parking garage
- Architectural style: Modern
- Location: Ørestad, Copenhagen
- Completed: 2008

Technical details
- Structural system: Reinforced concrete
- Floor count: 11
- Floor area: 33,000 square metres (360,000 sq ft)

Design and construction
- Architect: Bjarke Ingels Group + JDS Architects
- Main contractor: Høpnfer A/S
- Awards and prizes: 2009 ULI Award for Excellence; 2009 MIPIM Award for best residential building 2008 WAF Award for Best Residential Building; 2008 Forum AID Award

Mountain Dwellings (Danish: Bjerget) is a building in the Ørestad district of Copenhagen, Denmark, consisting of apartments above a multi-story car park. The building was designed by the Danish architectural practice PLOT (BIG+JDSA). The apartments scale the diagonally sloping roof of the parking garage, from street level to 11th floor, creating an artificial, south facing 'mountainside'. Each apartment has a "backyard" on the roof of the property in front and below it. The resulting courtyard penthouses are an attempt to balance "the splendours of the suburban backyard with the intensity of an urban lifestyle".

== Parking garage ==
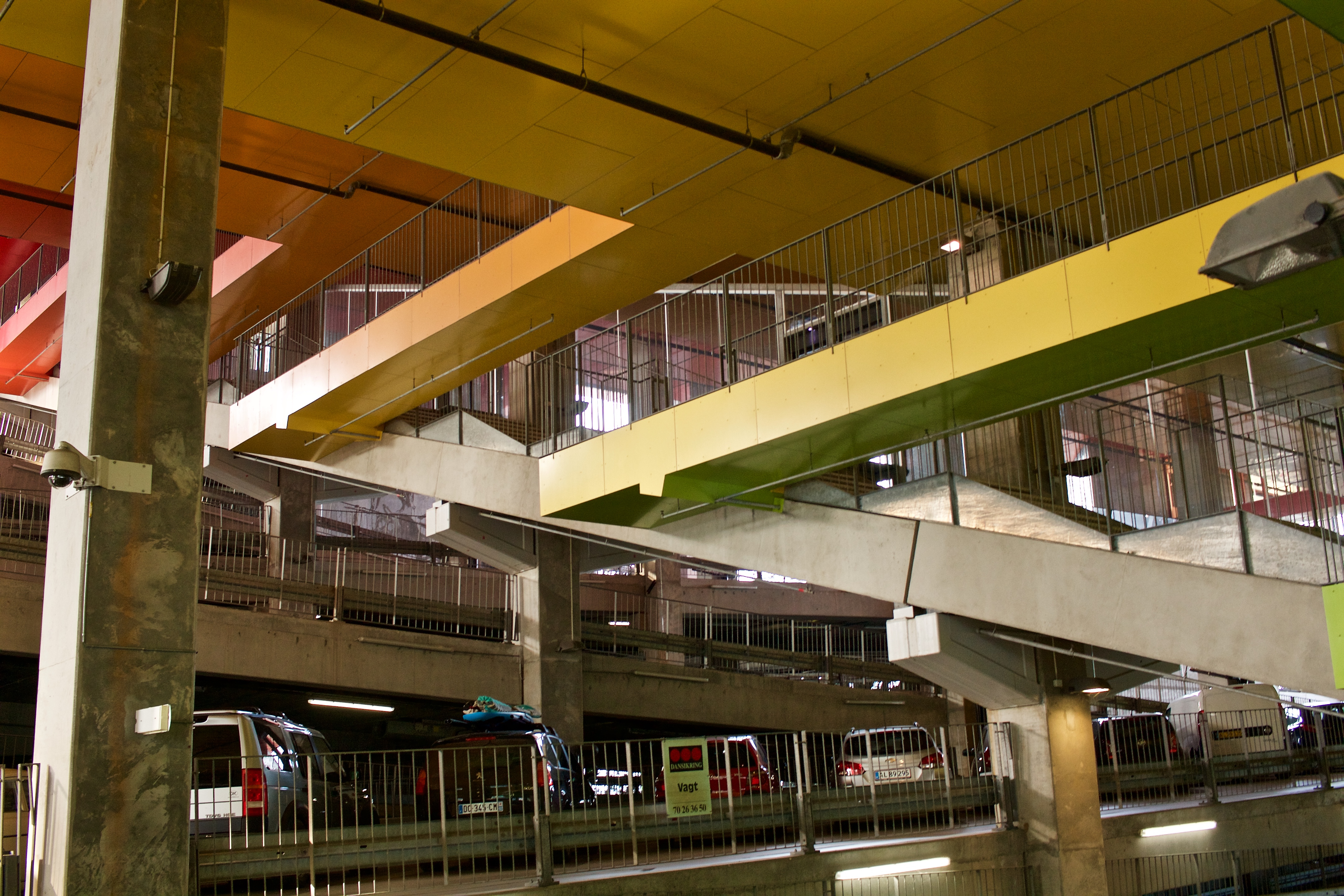
The interior

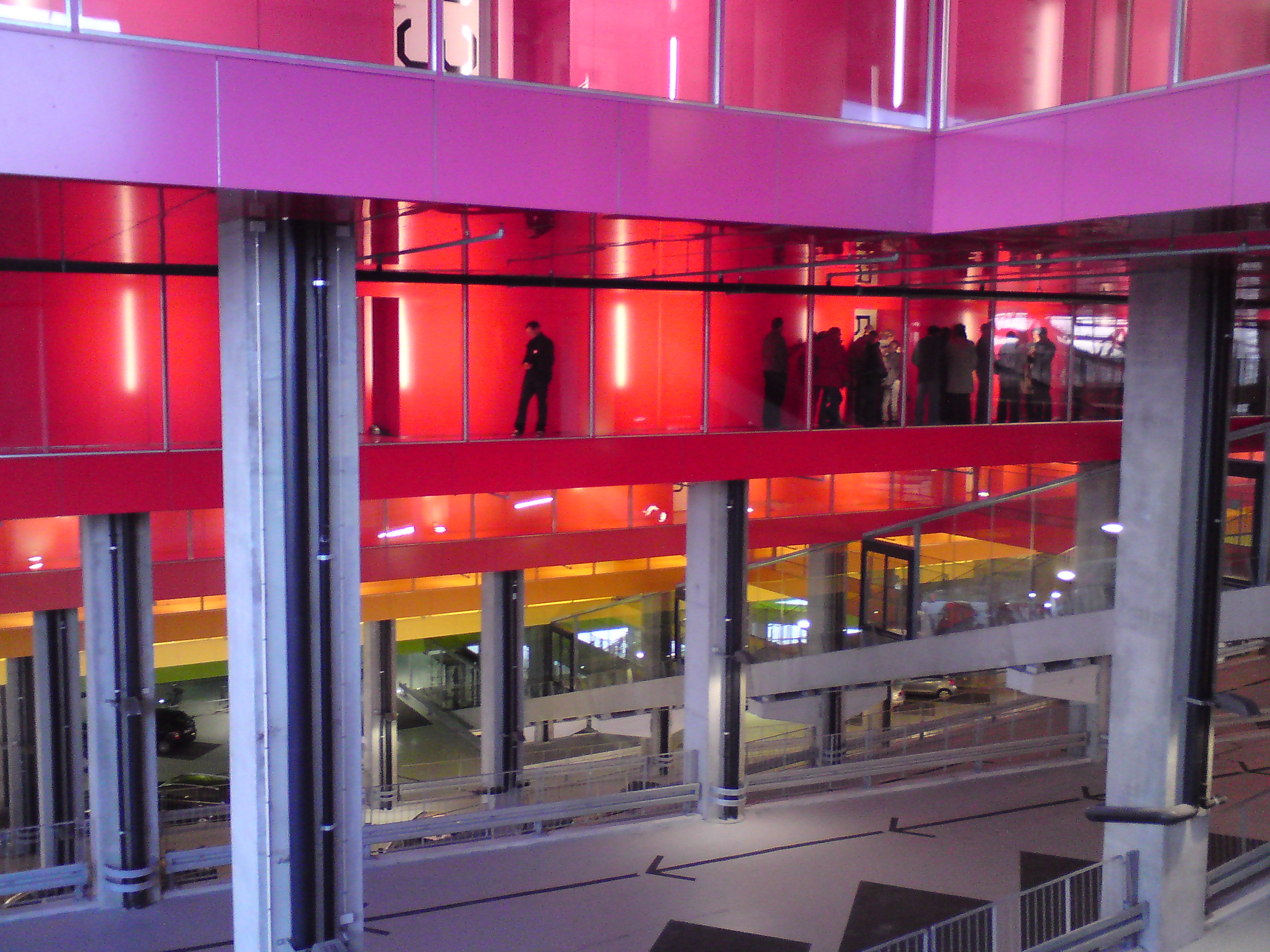
The interior

The parking garage contains parking spots for 480 cars. The space has up to 16 m high ceilings, and the underside of each level of apartments is covered in aluminum painted in a distinctive colour scheme of psychedelic hues which, as a tribute to Danish 1960s and '70s furniture designer Verner Panton, are all exact matches of the colours he used in his designs. The colours move, symbolically, from green for the earth over yellow, orange, dark orange, hot pink, purple to bright blue for the sky. Besides being a sloping podium for the residential units to sit on, maximizing sunlight and views, the central garage space also serves as an atrium containing the building's circulation, affording the only access to the apartments. A set of metal stairs climb through the main space over the parking lot, providing access to the hallways across suspended industrial-looking metal-clad concrete connections, while a Swiss-manufactured, ski lift-style inclined elevator moves along the wall of the garage. Each level's hallway is enclosed and encased in painted metal both on the interior and exterior, colored according to floor in the same hues used in the main space.

== Apartments ==
The sloping roof is covered with a single layer of 80 penthouses. Each apartment has an L-shaped floor plan and a terrace and small garden outside, located on the roof of the in-front, lower-level apartment. The design is inspired by suburban rowhouses developments. The L-shape floor plan in combination with a small courtyard was inspired by Jørn Utzon's Kingo Houses north of Copenhagen. The facades of the apartments towards the gardens are clad in untreated wood to increase the organic and calm feel of the setting.

== Artwork and ornamental features ==
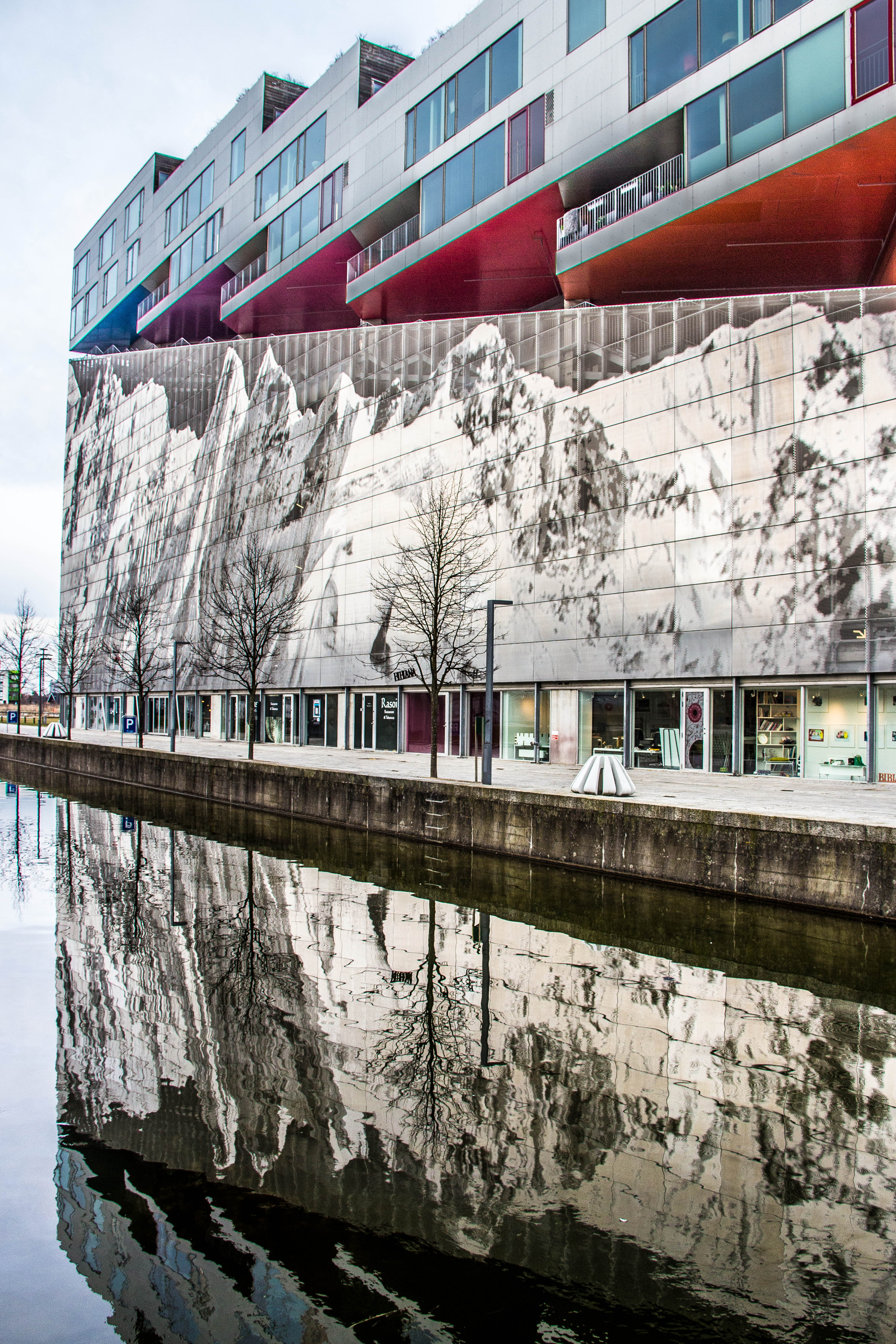
The Himalaya feature

=== Himalayan panorama ===
The northern and western facades of the parking garage depict a 3,000 m^{2} photorealistic mural of Himalayan peaks. The parking garage is protected from wind and rain by huge shiny aluminium plates, perforated to let in light and allow for natural ventilation. By controlling the size of the holes, the sheeting was transformed into the giant rasterized image of Mount Everest. The picture is based on a photo commissioned from a Japanese Himalaya photographer, though it had to be stretched to fit the proportions of the site.

=== Murals ===
The interior walls of the car park are decorated with a series of murals by the French street artist Victor Ash, depicting scenes of wildlife such as moose and wolves standing atop 'automobile mountains' of wrecked cars.

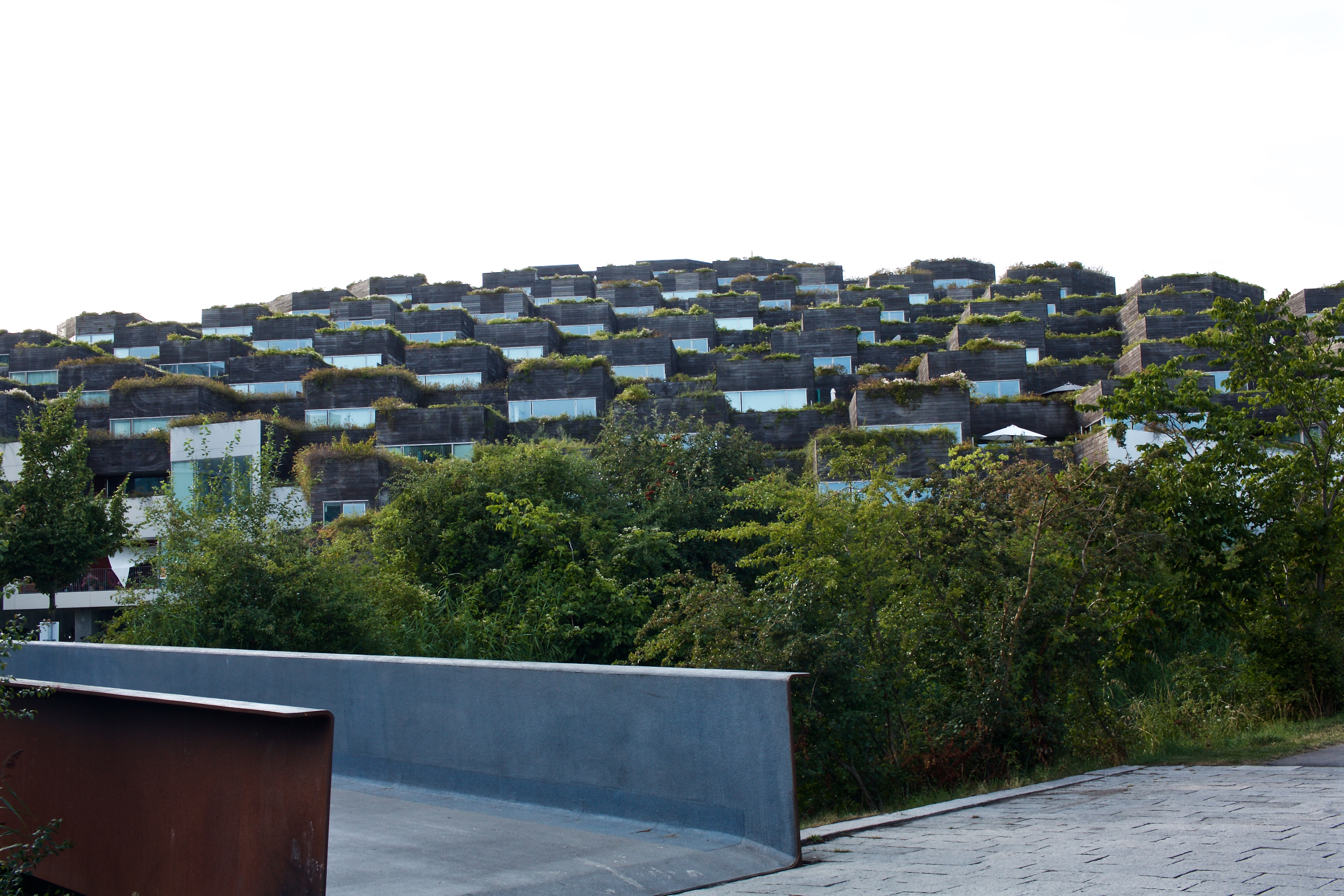
"The slope" in March 2015

=== Planting ===
The roof gardens are edged by elevated flowerbeds in the shape of planter railings, designed to block the view to neighbouring, lower-level apartments. They are planted according to a coordinated scheme of plants, which will make the colours and the appearance of the mountain slope change according to the changing seasons. The building has an extensive watering system which collects rainwater and uses it for automatically watering the roof gardens during dry periods.

== Other use ==
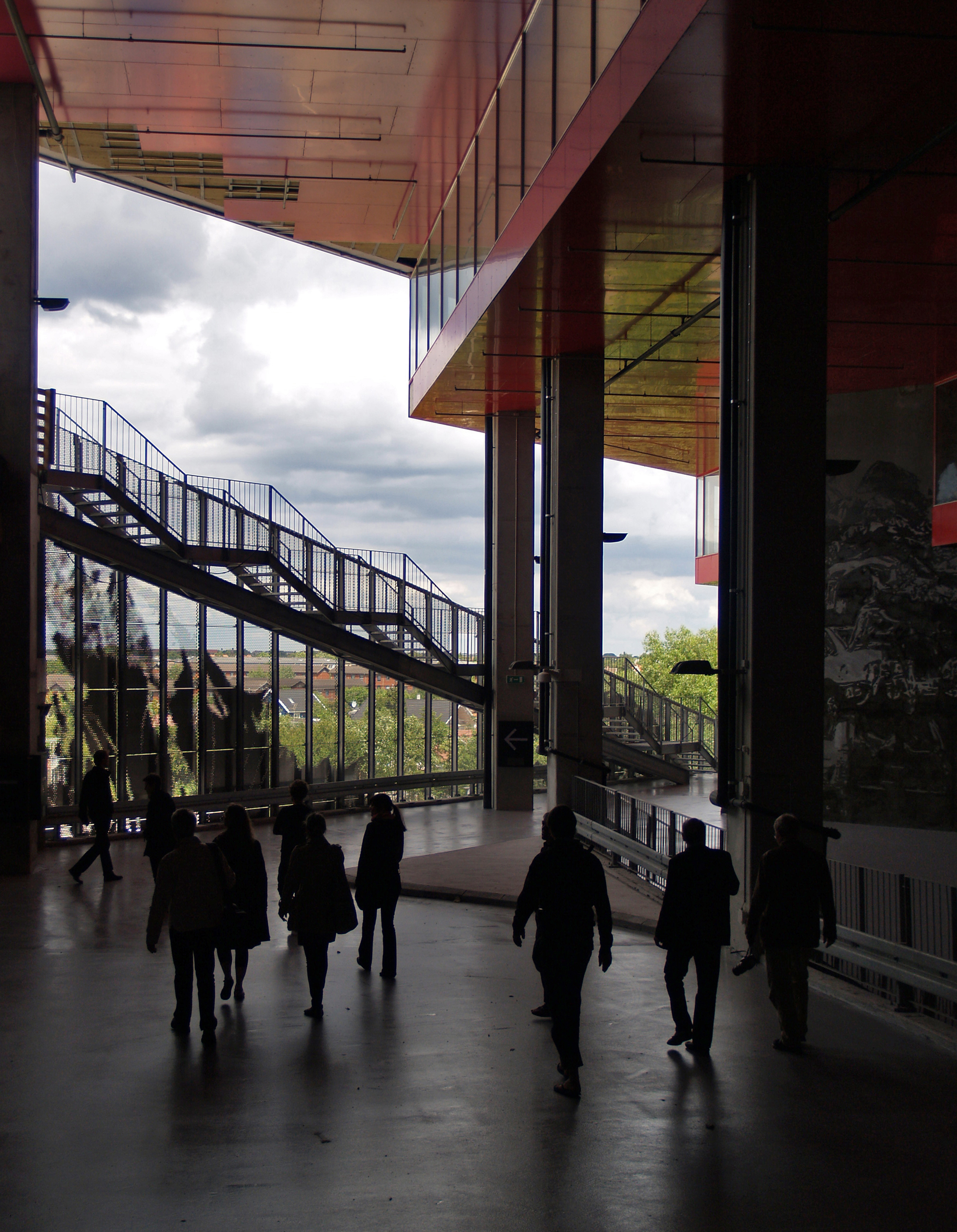
Interior of Mountain Dwellings

For special occasions, the urban space of the parking garage is used for events and parties, such as the closing party of Copenhagen Distortion in 2008.

A public staircase on the outside allows the general public to "climb" the mountain, and a local mountain climbers’ association will soon install a climbing wall at the back of the building, near the peak.

Mountain Dwellings is featured in the parkour documentary "My Playground".

== Awards ==
- 2009 ULI Award for Excellence
- 2009 MIPIM Award for best residential development
- 2008 World Architecture Festival Award for Best Residential Building
- 2008 Forum AID Award for Best Building in Scandinavia in 2008

== Image gallery ==
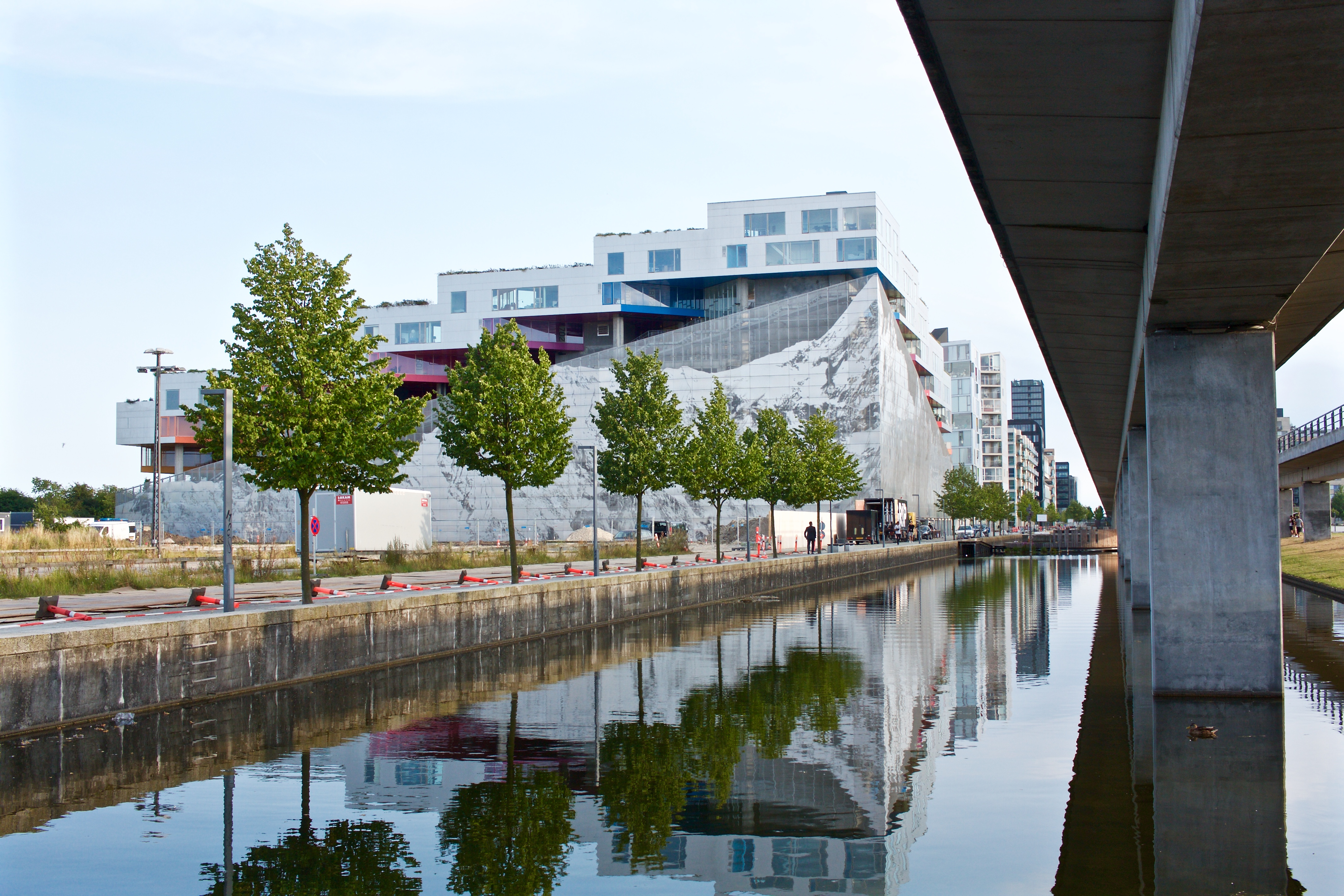
The building viewed from afar

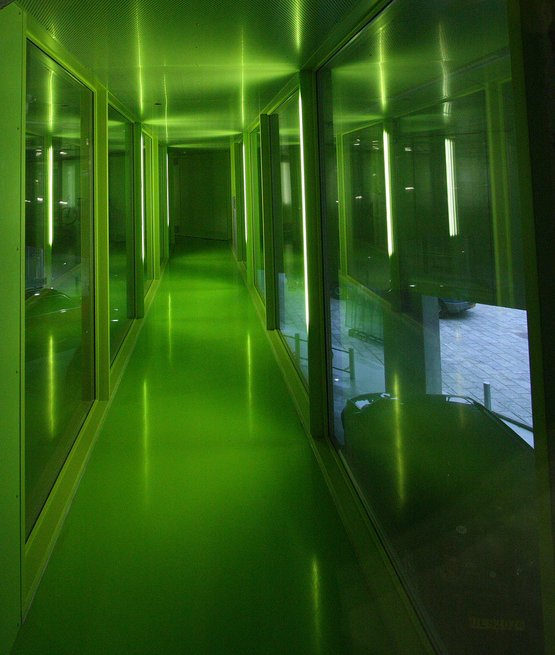
The green hallway

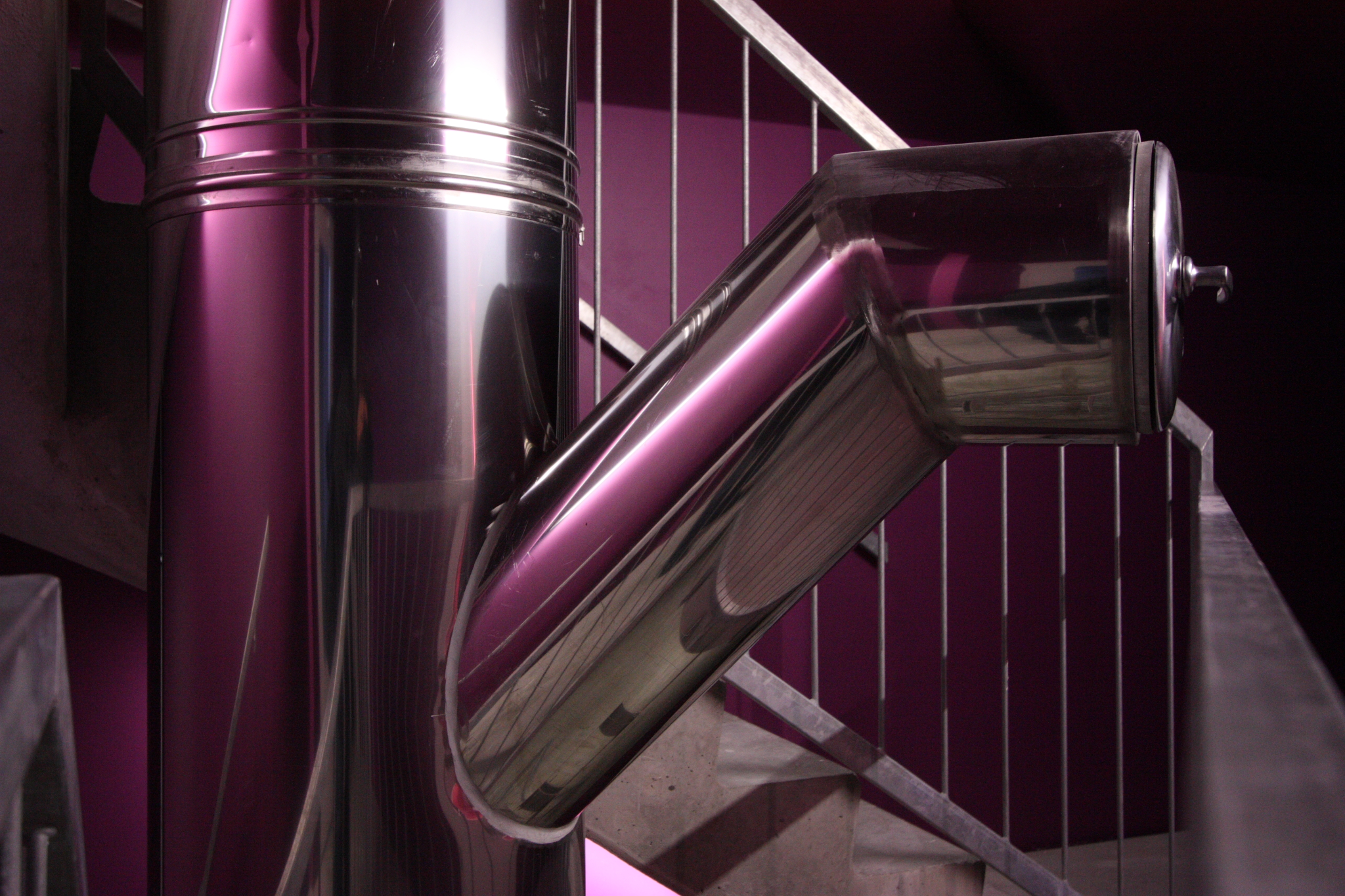

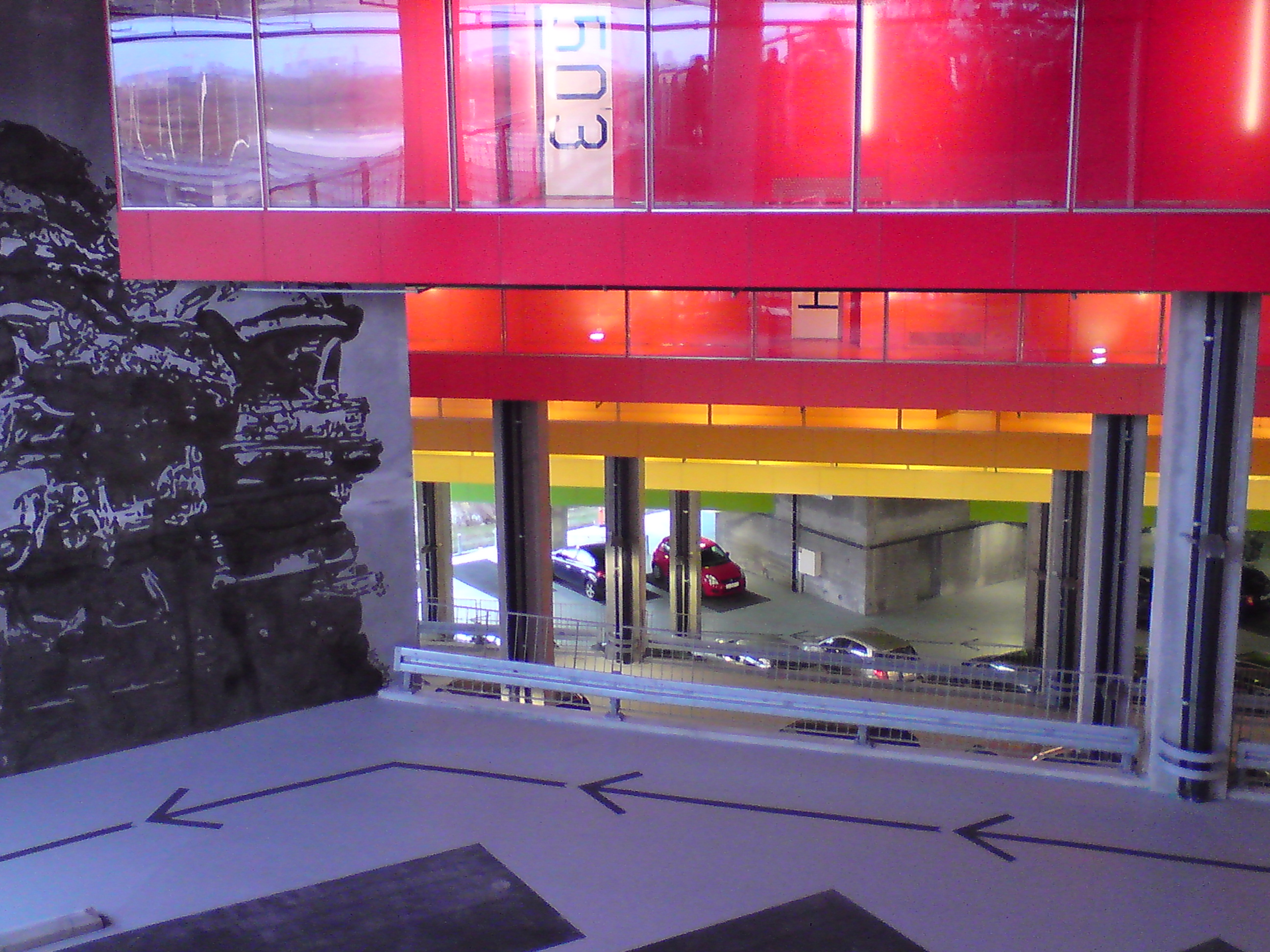

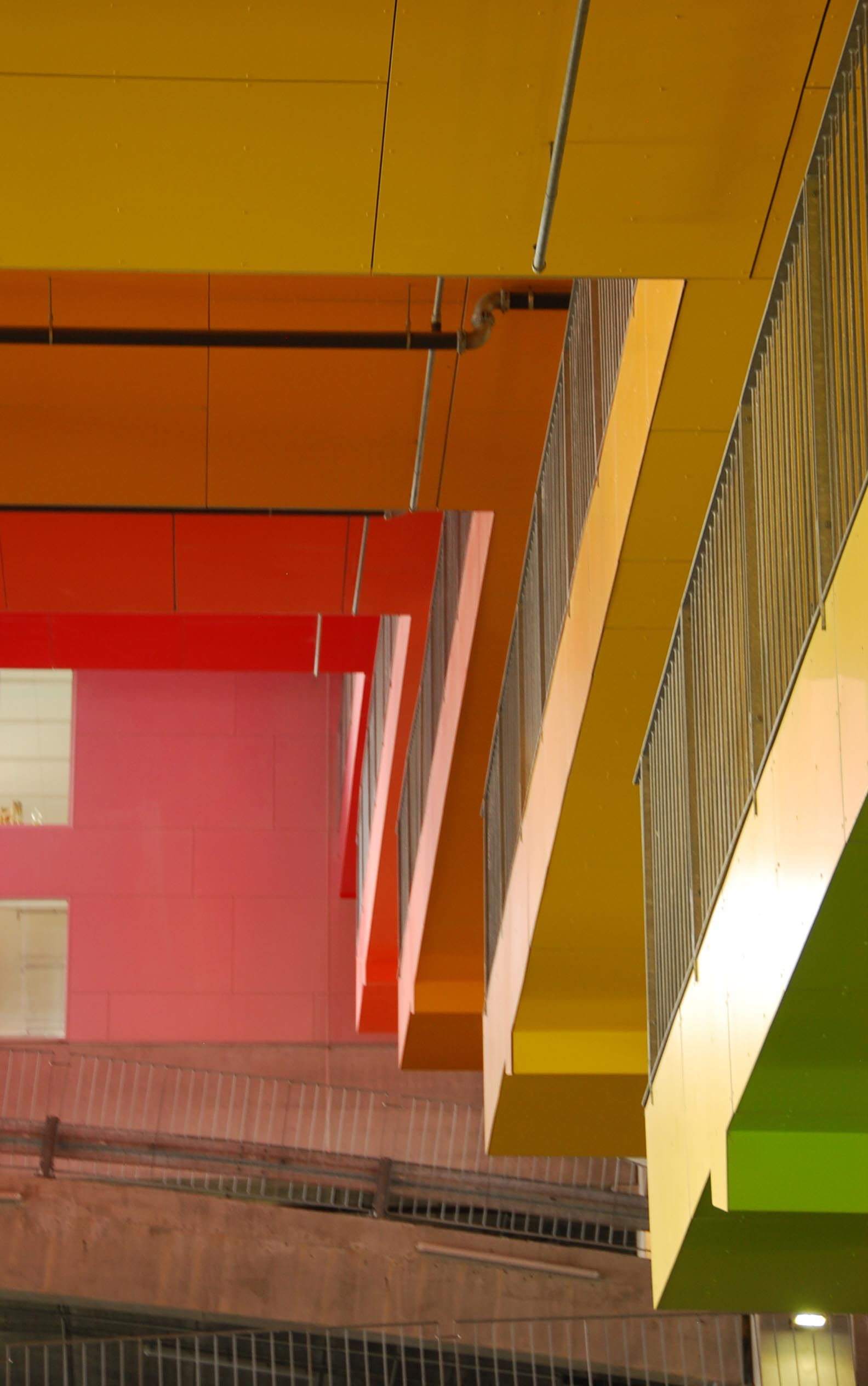
