= Aarhus Symposium =

Annual leadership conference in Denmark

- Founded: 2011
- Founders: Kasper Vinther Olesen; Jens Riis Andersen; David Scherer; Andreas Emmertsen
- Type: Non-profit organisation
- Location: University of Aarhus, Aarhus, Denmark
- Board of directors: Kristina Risom Jespersen; Karina Schmitt Lund; Torben M. Andersen; Jens Riis Andersen; Michael Jensen; Nick Melgaard; Kasper Vinther Olesen; Henrik Lind
- Website: aarhus-symposium.org

Aarhus Symposium is an annual leadership conference taking place at the University of Aarhus, Denmark, on the first Friday in November. The aim of the event is to connect leaders of today with leaders of tomorrow. To do so, a wide range of key decision-makers are invited to share their experiences and engage in discussions with students from various universities. Hereby, the symposium allows students to relate their academic insights to the broader business society.

Aarhus Symposium was founded in 2011 and has since expanded its concept to also involve Aarhus Symposium Focus, and Aarhus Symposium Challenge.

Aarhus Symposium is a non-profit organisation, and all symposia are organised by voluntary students together with a pro bono board of directors.

== History ==
Four students at Aarhus University established Aarhus Symposium in 2011: David Scherer, Jens Riis Andersen, Kasper Vinther Olesen, and Andreas Emmertsen. They gathered support from other students to organise the very first Aarhus Symposium with the objective of building a bridge between students, i.e. the future leaders, and leaders in today's businesses and society.

The first annual Aarhus Symposium welcomed renowned speakers from the business society such as Carsten Bjerg (then CEO of Grundfos), Lars Rohde (then CEO of ATP), and Maria Rønn (CEO of Danmarks Radio). Throughout the years, the programme has extended to include prominent speakers such as His Royal Highness The Crown Prince of Denmark, Lars Rebien Sørensen (president and CEO of Novo Nordisk), and the Danish Prime Minister Lars Løkke Rasmussen.

Aarhus Symposium has grown through the years as a result of wide support from students, speakers, partners, and others. In 2012, the Organising Committee introduced Battle of the Economists; an event to take place on Monday in the week of Aarhus Symposium. It provided a national focus to the overall theme of Aarhus Symposium. The event was renamed Aarhus Symposium Focus in 2016 to broaden the possibilities for topics that exceed economic issues.

In 2013, Aarhus Symposium Challenge was established to strengthen the connection between students and the leaders of today. Aarhus Symposium Challenge is an essay competition in which selected speakers put forth a challenge for students to solve. Through their essay, students obtain a seat at both Aarhus Symposium and Aarhus Symposium Focus, and they potentially qualify for Leaders’ Forum. Since its initiation in 2013, an increasing number of students have participated in Aarhus Symposium Challenge, making it the primary sign-up for Aarhus Symposium and Aarhus Symposium Focus.

== Aarhus Symposium ==
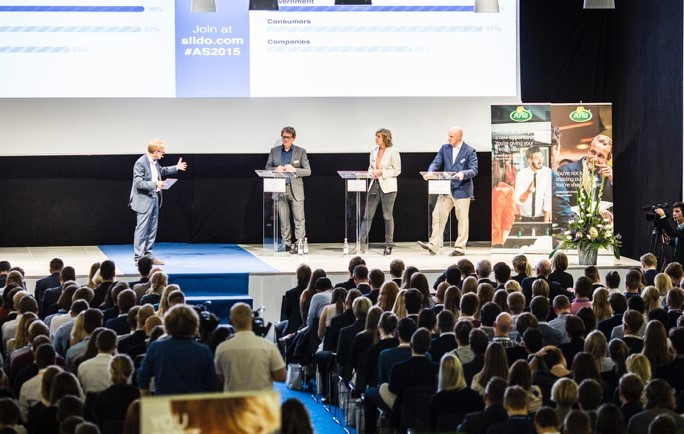
Climate Debate at Aarhus Symposium 2015 between (from left) Andreas Roepstorff, Connie Hedegaard, and Simon Giles moderated by Poul Erik Skammelsen.

Aarhus Symposium takes place on the first Friday in November. Here, business executives and key decision-makers are invited to share their experiences and insights regarding a specific theme. They do so with different perspectives that reflect the tracks, i.e. subtopics, of the event.

=== Past symposia ===
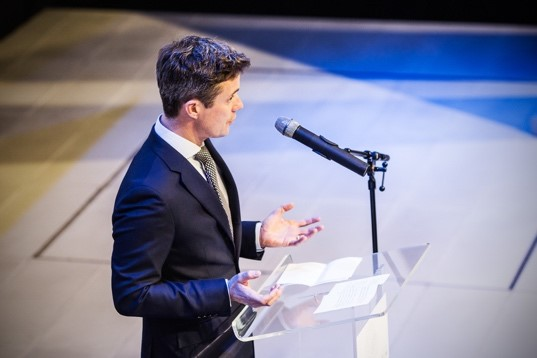
His Royal Highness The Crown Prince of Denmark's opening speech at Aarhus Symposium 2014.

Year	Theme	Speakers
2011	Growth in Distressed Economies: The Role of Ownership Structures	Carsten Bjerg, CEO of Grundfos; Ditlev Engel, CEO of Vestas; Flemming Lindeløv, Deltaq; Frederik Lotz, CFO of Arla Foods; Kim Fournais, CEO of Saxo Bank; Kurt Pedersen Kaalund, CEO of Cheminova A/S and Auriga Industries A/S; Lars Rohde, CEO of ATP; Maria Rønn, CEO of DR; Peter Engberg, CEO of Nykredit; Thomas Schmidt, MD, McKinsey & Company
2012	Growth and Sustainability	Gonçalo De Barros Carvalho Emello Mourão, Brazilian Ambassador, The Brazilian Embassy in Copenhagen; Henrik Skovby, founder and executive chairman at Dalberg; Jens Bjørn Andersen, CEO of DSV; Jimmy Fussing Nielsen, managing partner at Sunstone Capital; Jørgen Tang-Jensen, CEO of VELUX; Jørgen Vig Knudstorp, CEO of LEGO; Lars Rasmussen, CEO of Coloplast; Niels B. Christiansen, CEO of Danfoss; Per Bank, CEO of Dansk Supermarked; Steen Riisgaard, CEO of Novozymes; Susanne T. Nielsen, CEO of C.F. Møller Architects; Tania Ellis, founder and managing director at The Social Business Company; Tommy Ahlers, CEO of Podio
2013	Leadership and Innovation	Henrik Bennetsen, director of Health IT, Innovation Centre Denmark in Silicon Valley, CA, USA; Henrik Poulsen, CEO of DONG Energy; Jim Hagemann Snabe, co-CEO at SAP AG; Jørgen Rugholm, director at McKinsey & Co. Copenhagen Office; Lone Fønss Schrøder, partner at Norfalck; Mikkel Vestergaard Frandsen, CEO and owner at Vestergaard Frandsen; Nils S. Andersen, group CEO of A.P. Moller-Mærsk A/S; Peter Beske Nielsen, managing director at Blackrock; Soulaima Gourani, CEO of Soulaima Gourani APS; Tine Thygesen, CEO of Everplaces
2014	Leadership and Strategy	Anders Eldrup, professional board member, chairman; Birger Steen, CEO of Parallels; General Peter Bartram, Danish Chief of Defence; Jeff Gravenhorst, group CEO of ISS A/S; Karina Schmitt Lund, founder and CEO of Winterspring; Malou Aamund, director of marketing and Operations at Microsoft; Mette Lykke, co-founder and CEO of Endomondo; Morten Strunge, founder and CEO of Mofibo; Peder Tuborgh, CEO of Arla Foods; Thomas F. Borgen, group CEO of Danske Bank
2015	Leadership and Technology	Andreas Roepstorff, professor and director at Interacting Minds Centre, Aarhus University; Christian Clausen, president and CEO of Nordea; Christian Stadil, CEO of Thornico; Connie Hedegaard, chairman of the board at KR Foundation; Daniel Daboczy and Arno Smit, co-founders of FundedByMe; Eva Berneke, CEO of KMD; Jens-Peter Saul, group CEO of Ramboll; Lars Frelle-Petersen, director general at Danish Agency for Digitisation; Lars Rebien Sørensen, president and CEO of Novo Nordisk; Mads Nipper, group president and CEO of Grundfos; Robert Uggla, CEO of Svitzer; Simon Giles, global cities lead at Accenture
2016	The Art of Power	Anja Bechmann, head of the digital footprints research group at Aarhus University; Birgitte Bonnesen, CEO and president of Swedbank; Bjarke Ingels, founding partner at BIG; Jais Valeur, CEO of Danish Crown; Jens Birgersson, president and CEO of ROCKWOOL International; Jimmy Maymann, president of AOL content and consumer brands; Kim Schlyter, cyber risk leader at Deloitte Denmark and the Nordics; Lars Fjeldsøe-Nielsen, general partner of Balderton Capital; Matias Møl Dalsgaard, CEO and co-founder of GoMore; Morten Albæk, co-founder and CEO of Voluntas; Peder Holk Nielsen, president and CEO of Novozymes; Pernille Erenbjerg, president and CEO of TDC Group; Peter Bardenfleth-Hansen, director of Nordic sales at Tesla Motors; Thomas Lund-Sørensen, director at Centre for Cyber Security
2017	Leading Through Change	Bjarne Corydon, global director of McKinsey Center for Government; Bo Nilsson, CEO at Nets; Helle Valentin, global chief operating officer of Watson Internet of Things; Jacob Gram Alsing, chief operating officer at Mikkeller; Janina Kugel, chief human resources officer and member of the managing board at Siemens; Jesper Kunde, founder and CEO at Kunde & Co; Lars Rohde, chairman of the board of governors at Danmarks Nationalbank; Margrethe Vestager, European Commissioner for Competition; Ole Lund Hansen, chief of leadership programmes at United Nations Global Compact; Steen Borgholm, CEO at ECCO; Theis Søndergaard, chief product officer & co-founder of Vivino
2018	Creating Connections	Jan van de Winkel, CEO, Genmab; Niels B. Christiansen, CEO, The Lego Group; Afshan Khan, Regional Director, Europe & Central Asia, UNICEF; Ulrik Juul Christensen, Executive Chairman, Area9 Group; Rodin Genoff, Founder & Managing Director, Rodin Genoff and Associates; Søren Skou, CEO, Maersk Group; Jakob Askou Bøss, Senior VP, Corporate Strategy and Stakeholder Relations, Ørsted; Christian Erfurt, CEO and Co-Founder, Be My Eyes; Michael Bruun, Partner and Managing Director, Goldman Sachs; Inge Berneke, Partner, Egon Zehnder; Lars Jannick Johansen, Founder & Managing Partner, The Social Capital Fond; Lene Skole, CEO, Lundbeckfonden
2019	Mastering Creativity	Kasper Holten, Director, The Royal Danish Theatre; Mikkel Grene, CEO, Søstrene Grene; Henrik Andersen, CEO, Vestas; Christian Stadil, CEO & Co-Founder, Thornico; André Rogaczewski, CEO & Co-Founder, Netcompany; Susanne Mørch Koch, CEO, Danske Spil; Henrik Lund, CEO, Naturli' Foods; Nina Bjerring, Chief Transformation Officer, Arla Foods; Nana Bule, CEO, Microsoft Denmark; Signe Lopdrup, CEO, Roskilde Festival; Finn Poulsen, CEO, Co-Founder & Partner, Bestseller Retail Europe; Christoffer Bak, Christian Aachmann & Kasper Ulrich, Co-Founders, Shaping New Tomorrow
2021	A New Reality	Joe Kaeser, Chairman of the Supervisory Board, SIEMENS ENERGY, Siemens Energy; Margrethe Vestager, Executive Vice President, European Commission; Kim Fournais, CEO & Founder, Saxo Bank; Magnus Tyreman, Managing Partner in Europe, McKinsey & Company; Helle Østergaard Kristiansen, CEO, Danske Commodities; Mads Nipper, Group CEO, Ørsted; Per Bank, CEO, Salling Group; Britta Korre Stenholt, CEO, Stark Denmark; Anders Krab-Johansen, CEO & Publisher, Berlingske Media; Geeta Schmidt, Co-Founder & Vice President, Humio at CrowdStrike; Sebastian Vestergaard, Former CEO, Joe & The Juice; Mads Christiansen & Mathias Boe, Co-Founders, Aktieuniverset
2022	When Things Go North	Berit Basse, Ambassador, Consul General of Denmark in New York; Lars Lyse Hansen, CEO, Bolia International A/S; Christian Hyldahl, Managing Director, Head of Continental Europe, Blackrock; Laurits Bach Sørensen, Partner & Co-founder, Nordic Alpha Partners; Lars Fruergaard Jørgensen, President & CEO, Novo Nordisk; Henrik Bodskov, Incoming CEO, IO Business/NNIT; Kerstin Knapp, EVP & CPCO, Vestas; Jean Hedayat, Head of LinkedIn Sweden; Jacob Vittrup, CEO, NRGI; Celia Francis, Chief Commercial Officer, Earthshot Labs; Anders Samuelsen, CEO, UV Medico; Lars Seier Christensen, Founder & CEO, Seier Capital, Chairman of The Board, Concordium; Nicolai Moresco, Senior Vice President and General Manager, Dell Technologies Central & North Europe

== Aarhus Symposium Focus ==
Formerly known as Battle of the Economists

Aarhus Symposium Focus is an annual conference which takes place on Monday in the week of Aarhus Symposium. Here, experts with various backgrounds are invited to share their thoughts on a topic related to the overall theme of Aarhus Symposium. The event provides a national focus as the topic strives to reflect one of Denmark's most critical challenges.

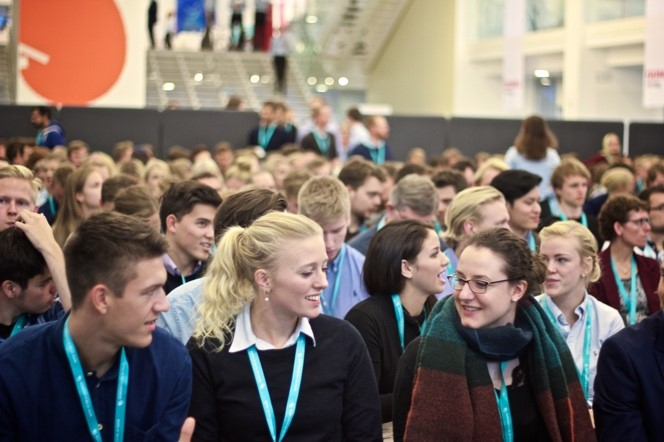
Participants at Battle of the Economists 2015

Year	Theme	Speakers
2012	Denmark's Challenges - Growth and Sustainability	Per Callesen, Governor at Danmarks Nationalbank; Steen Jakobsen, chief economist at Saxo Bank; Torben M. Andersen, professor of economics at Aarhus University
2013	Denmark's Challenges - Leadership and Innovation	Peter Mogensen, CEO of Kraka; Philipp Schröder, professor of economics at Aarhus University; Martin Ågerup, president at CEPOS
2014	The Superior Nordic Strategy	Erik Bjørsted, chief analyst at AE-rådet; Otto Brøns-Petersen, head of research at CEPOS; Torben M. Andersen, professor of economics at Aarhus University
2015	Go Green, Now?	Ditlev Engel, chairman of the board at Big Future 2025; Michael Svarer, professor at the Department of Economics and Management, Aarhus University; Thomas Dalsgaard, executive vice president at DONG Energy Thermal Power
2016	Demographic Changes – How will we work, age, and live?	Allan Lyngsø Madsen, chief economist at LO; Torben Tranæs, executive director of Research at SFI; Troels Bjerg, regional CEO Northern Europe at ISS A/S
2017	Globalisation In Reverse – The Danish Response	Christian Friis Bach, former executive secretary at [United Nations Economic Commission for Europe|UNECE]; Dennis Novy, associate professor of economics at University of Warwick; Edward Ashbee, associate professor at Department of Business and Politics, Copenhagen Business School; Thomas Schulz, group CEO at FLSmidth
2018	Making Automation Work	Lars Frelle-Petersen, Director of Digisation, Confederation of Danish Industry; Dominik Bösl [de], Vice President, Consumer Driven Robots, KUKA; Philipp Schröder, Member of the Danish Disruption Council; David Budtz-Petersen, Head of Research, Humanomics Research Center
2019	Denmark as a Creative Superpower	Elisabetta Lazzaro, Professor of Creative Economy, HKU University of the Arts Utrecht; Betina Hagerup, Director, The Danish Chamber of Commerce; Lene Tanggaard, Professor, Department of Communication and Psychology, Aalborg University; Bo Linnemann, Owner and Founding Partner, Kontrapunkt
2021	Impact before Income?	Philipp Schröder, Professor of Economics, Aarhus University, Director, Find Research Centre; Torben M. Andersen, Professor of Economics, Aarhus University, Chairman of the Board of Director, ATP; Simon Richard Nielsen, Editor in Chief, Euroinvestor; Rasmus Nørgaard, Founder, Home.Earth
2022	Shades of Innovation	Peder Tuborgh, CEO, Arla Foods; Jasmina Pless, Head of Entrepreneurship, Danish Chamber of Commerce (Dansk Erhverv); Mads Lundby Hansen, Chief Economist, CEPOS; Lars Frederiksen, Professor of Innovation, Entrepreneurship and Strategy, Aarhus University

== Aarhus Symposium Challenge ==
Aarhus Symposium Challenge is an essay competition where selected speakers put forth a challenge for students to solve. By submitting a qualified essay, students obtain a seat at both Aarhus Symposium and Aarhus Symposium Focus. Additionally, the participating students compete for the Aarhus Symposium Award and a spot in Leaders’ Forum.

Year	Speakers and topics of Aarhus Symposium Challenge
2013	Jim Hagemann Snabe, co-CEO at SAP AG: Facing global challenges with IT innovation; Nils S. Andersen, group CEO of A.P. Moller-Mærsk A/S: Leading in troubled waters; Peter Beske Nielsen, managing director at Blackrock: Financial innovation
2014	General Peter Bartram, Danish Chief of Defence: Abilities of a modern leader; Peder Tuborgh, CEO of Arla Foods: Communication strategy on a global stage; Thomas F. Borgen, group CEO of Danske Bank: Transformation through leadership
2015	Christian Stadil, CEO of Thornico: Ensuring the success of a startup; Connie Hedegaard, chairman of the board at KR Foundation: Initiatives securing our future; Robert Uggla, CEO of Svitzer: Leader in the digital age
2016	Jimmy Maymann, president of AOL Content and Consumer Brands: The influence of digitalisation; Morten Albæk, co-founder and CEO of Voluntas: Investing for impact; Peder Holk Nielsen, president and CEO of Novozymes: Partnering for success
2017	Bjarne Corydon, global director of McKinsey Center for Government: The challenge facing public institutions; Helle Valentin, global chief operating officer of Watson Internet of Things: How technology can create positive change; Janina Kugel, chief human resources officer and member of the managing board at Siemens: Successfully leading the employee of tomorrow
2018	Niels B. Christiansen, CEO, The Lego Group: How a company can enjoy the advantages of collaborating with others while protecting its core values; Afshan Khan, Regional Director Europe & Central Asia, UNICEF: One area in which every child does not have equal opportunities and one way to address this issue; Ulrik Juul Christensen, Founder and Executive Chairman, Area9 Group: How to achieve a specific competence that will be important on the future labour market
2019	Susanne Mørch Koch, CEO, Danske Spil: How established companies can uncover their entrepreneurial potential and reinvent themselves; André Rogaczewski, CEO & Co-Founder, Netcompany: How a specific industry can be radically changed by introducing a creative technology; Henrik Andersen, CEO, Vestas: A way for businesses or governments to combat climate change and the benefits of doing so
2021	Joe Kaeser, Chairman of the Supervisory Board, SIEMENS ENERGY, Siemens Energy: How economic growth can be more just and sustainable; Helle Østergaard Kristiansen, CEO, Danske Commodities: One area where automation can cause dilemmas for businesses and how to deal with them; Kim Fournais, CEO & Founder, Saxo Bank: How organisational agility can improve adaptiveness in dynamic markets
2022	Lars Fruergaard Jørgensen, President & CEO, Novo Nordisk: Whether and how diversity and inclusion can provide increased nordic competitiveness; Laurits Bach Sørensen, Partner & Co-founder, Nordic Alpha Partners: How nordic countries can contribute to an effective global green transition; Jean Hedayat, Head of LinkedIn Sweden: How the North can develop and maintain a competitive workforce

=== Leaders' Forum ===
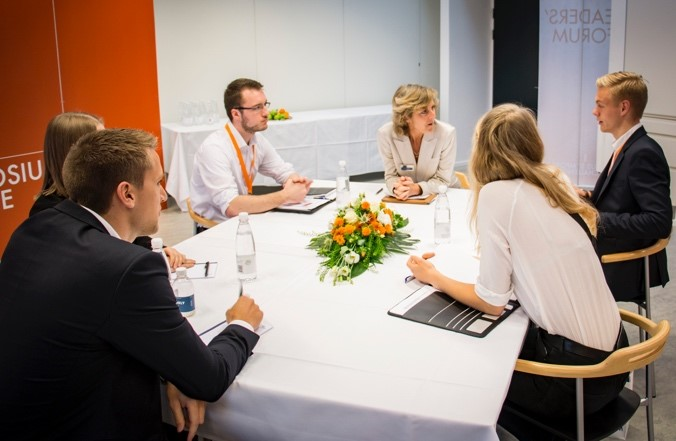
Leaders’ Forum session with Connie Hedegaard at Aarhus Symposium 2015.

Leaders’ Forum is an exclusive and intimate session where selected students discuss their essay contribution with the leader that put forth the respective challenge. Only the best essay contributions under each challenge topic qualifies for this informal session.

Throughout the years, Leaders’ Forum has attracted much attention from the media inasmuch as it is unique in a Danish context and provides both the attending students and the top leaders the opportunity to learn from each other.

=== The Aarhus Symposium Award ===
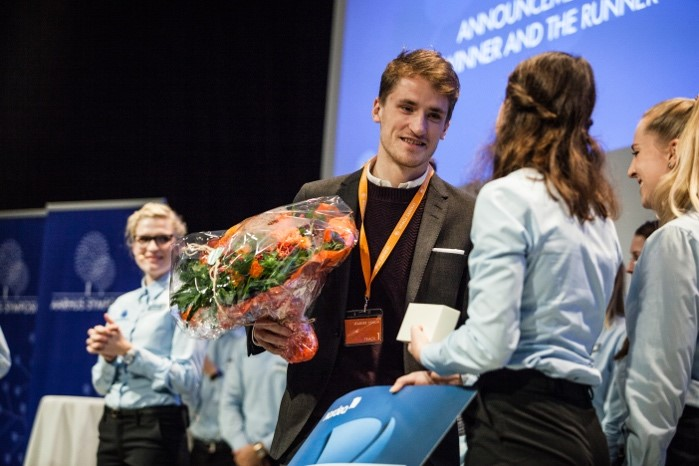
Oskar Harmsen, winner of the Aarhus Symposium Award 2015, rewarded on stage at Aarhus Symposium 2015.

The most extraordinary essay contribution in Aarhus Symposium Challenge will be rewarded the Aarhus Symposium Award on stage at the very end of Aarhus Symposium. Prior winners of the Aarhus Symposium Award are:

- 2013: Bastian Stemann Lau
- 2014: Moma Vujisic
- 2015: Oskar Harmsen
- 2016: Luke McGinty
- 2017: Bastian Emil Jørgensen
- 2018: Soraya Redondo Mezmizi
- 2019: Morten Thinggaard Pedersen
- 2021: Christian Nyegaard Lambertsen
- 2022: Lasse Daabeck

== Other events ==
Besides facilitating Aarhus Symposium and Aarhus Symposium Focus, Aarhus Symposium also hosts a variety of other events that takes places at Aarhus University. Most notable are Aarhus Symposium Theme Announcement and Aarhus Symposium Challenge Launch; both of which are closely linked to the three key elements of Aarhus Symposium.

== Organising Committee ==
The Organising Committee of Aarhus Symposium consists of approximately 41 voluntary students, who have the responsibility for planning, funding, promoting, and executing all events. The Organising Committee is divided into smaller groups with specific focus areas:

- Steering Committee
- Programme Group
- Business Relations Group
- Marketing Group
- Essentials Group
- University Alliances
- IT Group
- Finance Group
- Business Development
