= Green Monday (disambiguation) =

Green Monday may refer to:

- Green Monday, an online retail industry term, coined by eBay to describe its best sales day in December.
- Green Monday (organization), a social enterprise group that promotes and enables green, healthy and sustainable living.
- An alternative name for Clean Monday, the first day of the Great Lent in Greece and Cyprus, mainly used by English-speakers in Cyprus.
