= List of City University Hong Kong Alumni =

This is a table of famous graduates of the City University of Hong Kong.

== Arts and entertainment ==
Name	Class year(s)	Degree(s)	School	Notability	Reference
Phoebe HUI Fong Wah	--	Bachelor of Arts (Honours) in Creative Media	School of Creative Media	Contemporary artist; Artist of the Year (Media Arts) of The 16th Hong Kong Arts Development Awards in 2022	
Vivek Mahbubani	2015	Bachelor of Arts (Honours) in Creative Media	School of Creative Media	Comedian; recipient of the 2018 Hong Kong’s Ten Outstanding Young Persons Award	
Nick CHEUK Yick-him	2012	Bachelor of Arts (Honours) in Creative Media	School of Creative Media	Best New Director in the 60th Golden Horse Awards and Best New Director in the 42nd Hong Kong Film Awards	
WONG Chun	2011	Bachelor of Arts (Honours) in Creative Media	School of Creative Media	Best New Director, the 53rd Taipei Golden Horse Awards	
NG Kai Chung	2013	Bachelor of Arts (Honours) in Creative Media	School of Creative Media	Director of Another World; Winner of Best Animated Feature at the 62nd Golden Horse Awards	
CHEUNG Siu Hong	2004	Bachelor of Arts (Honours) in Creative Media	School of Creative Media	Recipient, Best Art Direction, the 39th Hong Kong Film Awards; Recipient, Best Makeup & Costume Design, the 62nd Golden Horse Awards	
CHAN Kin Long	2012	Bachelor of Arts (Honours) in Digital Media Broadcasting	School of Creative Media	Recipient, Best New Director, the 40th Hong Kong Film Awards	
LAU Kok Rui	2011	Bachelor of Business Administration (Honours) in Marketing	College of Business	Recipient, Best New Director and Best Original Screenplay, the 59th Golden Horse Awards	

== Business and finance ==
Name	Class year(s)	Degree(s)	School	Notability	Reference
Rocky CHENG Chung Ngam	--	Master of Science in Computer Science	College of Computing	CEO of Hong Kong Cyberport Management Company Limited	
William WONG Lok Cheung	--	Bachelor of Arts (Honours) in International Business Studies	College of Business	Chairman of the Board of Directors of listed company Digital Domain	
Allen SHI Lop Tak	2007	Master of Business Administration (Executive)	College of Business	Group Chairman of Brilliant International Group Limited	
Steve CHUANG Tzu-hsiung	2025	Doctor of Business Administration	College of Business	Chairman and CEO of ProVista Group	
Michael LEUNG Kin Man	2023	Doctor of Business Administration	College of Business	Co-founder & Executive Director of EMEKO International Ltd.	
Simon HUI Hing-tak	1991	Bachelor of Arts (Honours) in Business Studies	College of Business	Chairman and CEO of E.P.S.A CORPORATION LTD	
Haywood CHEUNG	2014 2012	Doctor of Business Administration Master of Business Administration (Executive)	College of Business	Chairman of Cheung's Gold Traders Limited	
Toa CHARM Ka Ieong	2014	Doctor of Business Administration	College of Business	Former Chief Public Mission Officer of Cyberport	
Martin ZHU Yihao	--	Doctor of Philosophy	School of Energy and Environment	CEO and Co-founder of i2Cool Limited; Forbes China 30 Under 30 List	
Sunny CHAI Ngai-chiu	2011	Engineering Doctorate	College of Engineering	Former Chairman of Hong Kong Science and Technology Parks	
Gary CHENG Faat Ting	2012	Master of Business Administration (Executive)	College of Business	Chairman of Gary Cheng Group	
WONG Tin Cheung	2020	Doctor of Philosophy	College of Engineering	Vice Chairman of Yau Lee Holdings Ltd.	
LAM Wai Ming	2014	Master of Business Administration (Executive)	College of Business	Director of the major subsidiaries, China In-Tech Limited	
Robert LUI Chi Wang Andrew	2000	Bachelor of Business Administration (Honours) in Finance	College of Business	Capital Market Services Group Southern Region Offering Services Leader, Deloitte China; Digital Asset Leader and Government & Public Services Industry Leader, Deloitte China Hong Kong; Council Member, City University of HK	
IU Man Chung	1999	Bachelor of Business Administration (Honours) in Quantitative Analysis for Business	College of Business	Executive Director and Chief Executive, ZA Bank Limited	
Lawrence TZANG Chi Hung	--	Doctor of Philosophy Bachelor of Science with Honours in Applied Chemistry	College of Science	Co-Founder and Chief Scientific Officer and director, Prenetics	
DAI Jun	2021	Doctor of Business Administration	College of Business	Chairman and CEO, Robotechnik Intelligent Technology Co., Ltd.	
KANG Bo	2020	Doctor of Business Administration	College of Business	Vice President of Seres Group	
WAN Wai Yin	1994	Bachelor of Science (Honours) in Computer Studies	College of Computing	Chief Information Officer, MTR Corporation	
Anthony LAM Sai Ho	2015	Master of Business Administration (Executive)	College of Business	Group Chief Executive Officer, Golden Resources Development International Limited	
CHIU Kai Man	--	Master of Business Administration	College of Business	President, Schneider Electric Hong Kong	
Jackson CHAN Ka Shing	2024	Master of Business Administration (Executive)	College of Business	Co-founder and Executive Director, KOS International Talent Group	
Jerry LO Tik Ting	--	Bachelor of Business Administration in Finance	College of Business	Co-founder of Eat100	
Eugene HO Chun Ting	--	Bachelor of Business Administration (Honours) in Business Analysis	College of Business	Co-founder of Dayta AI	
Eddie LAM Kin Wing	--	Master of Business Administration (Executive) Postgraduate Diploma in Construction Management	College of Business College of Engineering	Former President, Hong Kong Construction Association (2021-2025)	
James Utama SURJADI	2022	Doctor of Philosophy	College of Engineering	Co-founder of Super Bamboo Limited	

== Government, law and public policy ==
Name	Class year(s)	Degree(s)	School	Notability	Reference
Francis NGAI Wah Sing	1994	Bachelor of Arts with Honours in Quantitative Analysis for Business	College of Business	Founder and Chief Executive Officer of SVhk; Co-Founder of Green Monday, Playtao Education and RunOurCity.	
Rimsky YUEN Kwok-keung	1997	Master of Laws in Chinese and Comparative Law	School of Law	Former Secretary for Justice of Hong Kong	
Chan Yung	1994	Bachelor of Social Work with Honours	College of Liberal Arts and Social Sciences	Convenor of HKSAR deputies to the National People’s Congress	
John TSE Chun-Chung	--	Master of Arts in Public Policy and Management	College of Liberal Arts and Social Sciences	Director of Information Services of HKSAR	
William YU Yuen Ping	1995	Bachelor of Arts (Honours) in International Business Studies	College of Business	Founder & CEO of World Green Organization	
Kanie SIU Mei-kuen	2012	Master of Social Sciences in Development Studies	College of Liberal Arts and Social Sciences	CEO of Plan International Hong Kong	
HSU Siu Man	--	Master of Social Sciences in Counselling	College of Liberal Arts and Social Sciences	Executive Director of The Hong Kong Federation of Youth Groups	
ZHANG Lingling	2012	Master of Laws (Common Law)	School of Law	Judge of the United Nations Appeals Tribunal	
Horace Cheung Kwok Kwan	--	Postgraduate Certificate in Laws	School of Law	Deputy Secretary for Justice of HKSAR	
CHAN Ka Kui	2003	Master of Arts in Arbitration and Dispute Resolution	School of Law	Chairman of Mustard Seed Foundation; Past Chairman, Construction Industry Council; Non-Executive Director, Urban Renewal Authority	
CHENG Chung Wai	1989	Bachelor of Arts (Honours) in Public and Social Administration	College of Liberal Arts and Social Sciences	Former Permanent Secretary, Chief Executive's Office, HKSAR Government (2022-2024)	
TONG Man Lung	2002	Master of Laws in Chinese and Comparative Law	School of Law	President, Law Society of Hong Kong	
Derek CHAN Ching Lung	2003	Postgraduate Certificate in Laws	School of Law	Senior Counsel, appointed by the HKSAR Government	
CHAN Pak Wai	2023	Doctor of Philosophy	College of Engineering	Director, HK Observatory	
Scott LEUNG Man Kwong	--	Postgraduate Certificate in Chinese	College of Liberal Arts and Social Sciences	Member of the Legislative Council of Hong Kong	
Louise HO Pui Shan	--	Bachelor of Arts (Honours) in International Business Studies	College of Business	Former Commissioner of Customs and Excise (2021- 2024)	
Christine LOH Maria Kung Wai	--	Master of Laws in Chinese and Comparative Law	School of Law	Former Undersecretary for the Environment, HKSAR Government (2012-17)	
LAI Man Hin	2004 1997	Master of Arts in Public Policy and Management Higher Diploma in Legal Studies	College of Liberal Arts and Social Sciences School of Law	Former Director of Fire Services, HKSAR Government	
LI Pak Chuen	1990	Bachelor of Arts with Honours in Business Studies	College of Business	Permanent Secy for Home and Youth Affairs, HKSAR Government	
CHEUNG Tin Cheung	2008	Doctor of Philosophy	College of Engineering	Chairman, Board of Directors, Hong Kong Green Building Council; Former Director of Buildings, HKSAR Government	

== Sports ==
Name	Class year(s)	Degree(s)	School	Notability	Reference
Grace Lau Mo-sheung	2016	Bachelor of Science (Honours) in Creative Media	School of Creative Media	Karateka; bronze medalist in the 2020 Summer Olympics – Women's kata; medallist, including gold, in the women's individual kata event at the World Karate Championships, Asian Games and Asian Karate Championships; recipient of the Hong Kong’s Ten Outstanding Young Persons Award and Medal of Honour (Hong Kong)	

== Education ==
Name	Class year(s)	Degree(s)	School	Notability	Reference
Joshua MOK Ka Ho	1989	Bachelor of Arts (Honours) in Public and Social Administration	College of Liberal Arts and Social Sciences	President, The Hang Seng University of Hong Kong	
ZHONG Zhijin	2009	Doctor of Philosophy	College of Liberal Arts and Social Sciences	Dean, School of Journalism and Coomunication, Sun Yat-Sen University	
Kenneth LEUNG Mei Yee	1996 1992	Master of Philosophy Higher Diploma in Applied Science	College of Science	Vice-President (Research), City University of Hong Kong	
