= Albæk =

Albæk is a Danish surname. Notable people with the surname include:

- Mads Albæk (born 1990), Danish footballer
- Morten Albæk (born 1975), Danish sophist, author, business person, and public speaker

== See also ==
- Ålbæk
