= Thomas Lund =

Thomas Lund may refer to:

- Thomas Lund (badminton) (born 1968), Danish badminton player
- Thomas Lund (dancer) (born 1974), Danish ballet dancer and head of the Royal Danish Ballet school
- Thomas Lund (footballer) (born 1970), Norwegian footballer

== See also ==
- Thomas Lund-Sørensen (born 1964) is a Danish diplomat
- Tom Lund (born 1950), Norwegian football coach and footballer
- Tom Lund (handballer) (1944–2000), Danish handball player
