= Kunde =

Kunde may refer to:

- Kunde (surname)
- Kunde, Nepal, a village in the Khumbu region of Nepal
- Kunde & Co, a Danish advertising firm
- Kunde Hospital, a hospital in Kunde, Nepal
