= AirHelp =

Online airline company

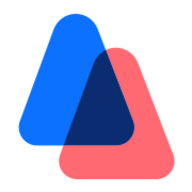
- Type: Private
- Industry: Claims management
- Founded: January 2013
- Founders: Henrik Zillmer
- Headquarters: Berlin
- Key people: Tomasz Pawliszyn (CEO); Jimmy Maymann (Board member)
- Number of employees: Over 400
- Website: https://www.airhelp.com/en/

AirHelp is an online service that allow airline passengers to seek compensation for flight cancellations, delays, or overbookings.

The company's initial focus was Europe where it uses European Regulation No 261/2004 to seek to obtain compensation that a passenger is entitled to in the event of denied boarding, cancellation, or a long delay of flights. However, since 2020, AirHelp has broadened its service and also supports passengers with flights in the US, Canada, Brazil, Turkey and Asia.

== History ==
AirHelp was founded in January 2013 by Henrik Zillmer. In its first year, the company launched websites in eight countries and five languages.

In March 2014, AirHelp graduated from Y Combinator’s prestigious Winter Class startup accelerator program in Silicon Valley. Two months later, in May 2014, the company won the Spark Award for innovation at the inaugural Collision Conference in Las Vegas, distinguishing itself from over 500 other applicants. That same year, AirHelp was named Best Danish Startup of the Year by the Nordic Startup Awards.

In October 2015, AirHelp released the first edition of the AirHelp Score, a ranking system evaluating the world’s major airlines based on on-time performance, customer opinion, and compensation processing.

In August 2016, AirHelp raised $12 million in Series A funding. The round included investment from Khosla Ventures and Evan Williams, co-founder and former CEO of Twitter.

In January 2017, the company launched AirHelp+, a membership program that ensures eligible passengers receive 100% of their compensation. In March of the same year, AirHelp introduced Herman, the world’s first AI-powered legal assistant, designed to streamline compensation claim processing at scale.

In January 2018, AirHelp co-founded APRA (Association of Passenger Rights Advocates) with other portals including Flightright, Reclamadores and Skyrefund, an organization aimed at advancing passenger rights globally. Later that year, in November 2018, the company won the Launch People’s Choice Award at the Phocuswright Conference.

In July 2019, AirHelp expanded into Brazil, enabling it to assist passengers under the country's ANAC 400 regulation.

In 2020, during the global COVID-19 pandemic and the near-total halt of air travel, AirHelp continued advocating for air passenger rights, particularly concerning cash refunds for canceled flights. In September 2020, the company began offering a Complete plan for AirHelp+ members, which included access to airport lounges in cases of flight delays.

In March 2021, AirHelp secured a landmark victory at the European Court of Justice, affirming passengers’ right to compensation for flight disruptions caused by airline staff strikes. In August 2021, the company expanded its customer support services to offer 24/7 live chat assistance. At the same year, AirHelp closed a $9 million round Series B-2 preferred stock. Main investments were made from NE II Feeder Société en commandite spéciale, TempoCap, MyCo Aps, H14 S.p.A. and Nordic Eye.

In May 2022, AirHelp published its first Air Passenger Rights Guide. In August 2022, the company launched AirPayout, its first insurance product, for select AirHelp+ members.

In July 2023, AirHelp began assisting passengers under Turkey’s SHY Passenger regulation. The following month, it introduced AirLuggage, a travel insurance product for lost or delayed baggage, available to selected AirHelp+ members. In November 2023, it partnered with One Tree Planted to plant one tree for every 100 disrupted flights. In 2023, AirHelp received the German Service Prize from DISQ (Deutsches Institut für Service-Qualität GmbH & Co. KG) and ntv Nachrichten.

In April 2024, AirHelp introduced two new AirHelp+ membership tiers: Smart and Pro. In June 2024, the company began supporting passengers covered under Saudi Arabia’s air passenger rights regulation. In 2024, AirHelp was recognized as one of the Most Loved Workplaces for Young Professionals by the Best Practice Institute, Inc. and Most Loved Workplace and received the Deutsche Kunden Award for outstanding price/performance from DtGV – Deutsche Gesellschaft für Verbraucherstudien mbH.

In March 2025, AirHelp secured a significant minority investment from Abry Partners. The following month, the company celebrated reaching over 10 million AirHelp+ customers. In 2025, AirHelp was certified as a Most Loved Workplace by the Best Practice Institute and named Best Flight Compensation Service Provider by the Spanish Business Awards.

== Services ==
=== Legislation ===
AirHelp utilises clauses of Regulation (EC) No. 261/2004 in Europe and other local air passenger rights regulations, such as UK261 in the United Kingdom, ANAC 400 in Brazil, air passenger protection regulations in Canada, Montreal Convention in the US, Turkey SHY Passenger, and Saudi Arabia PRPR, to help passengers obtain compensation.

=== Initial assessment ===
The eligibility of individual travelers is first determined through the use of a web form or mobile app. The initial assessment, to check compensation, is free. If Airhelp determines that a person is entitled to compensation, the person can commission the company to pursue a claim in exchange for a fee, with a fee only being charged if the company is successful in obtaining compensation.

=== Out-of-court settlement vs legal action ===
Where an airline refuses to settle the claim, AirHelp, together with its lawyers, can take legal action. On several occasions, these lawsuits have led the courts to clarify legal questions regarding passenger rights.

=== AirHelp+ Membership ===
AirHelp+ is AirHelp’s annual membership program that helps passengers when they face flight disruptions. Members pay no fees when AirHelp secures their compensation. They also get a range of additional benefits, such as 24/7 live chat support from experts, AirPayout insurance: an extra €100 paid within hours of your flight problem. AirLuggage insurance: €100 compensation for a lost or delayed bag.

=== Technology ===
To substantiate claims against airlines, AirHelp compiles information from multiple databases to verify the circumstances relating to the flight disruption. Additionally, the company uses AI to check passengers' eligibility against the reason given by an airline to reject a claim, often due to weather conditions. Airlines then have to offer proof that a flight was disrupted due to weather.

AirHelp is an early adopter of advanced process automation and AI and reported to have four bots that assist with claims: "Herman", "Lara", "AgA", which reviews all initial claims, and "Docky", which automatically requests additional travel documentation from passengers.

== Global rankings of airlines ==
Each year since 2015, AirHelp has produced a global report of airport and airline rankings. The airports are ranked according to on-time performance (60%), service quality (20%) and food & shops (20%), while airlines are ranked to on-time performance, service quality and claim processing with each category weighted equally.

AirHelp uses its own databases, commercial vendors, and passenger surveys to compile the data for their reports. Based on their AirHelp Score, Bloomberg News has reported on the best and worst airlines and airports in the world for the years 2024 and 2025. AirHelp rankings have also been used by several other media outlets, such as MSN, Yahoo Life and New York Post.

== See also ==
- Claims management
- Flight cancellation and delay
