= TDC Holding A/S =

Danish telecommunications company

- Company type: Private
- Industry: Telecommunications
- Founded: 1990; 36 years ago
- Headquarters: Copenhagen, Denmark
- Key people: Bert Nordberg (chairman); Henrik Clausen (president & CEO)
- Products: Fixed line and mobile telephony, Internet, digital television, IT services, satellite phone, Web hosting
- Revenue: DKK 23.344 billion (2014)
- Operating income: DKK 3.808 billion (2014)
- Net income: DKK 3.228 billion (2014)
- Total assets: DKK 74.4 billion (end 2014)
- Total equity: DKK 18.6 billion (end 2014)
- Owner: Macquarie Group; PFA; PKA; ATP
- Number of employees: 8,594 (FTE, end 2014)
- Website: tdcgroup.com

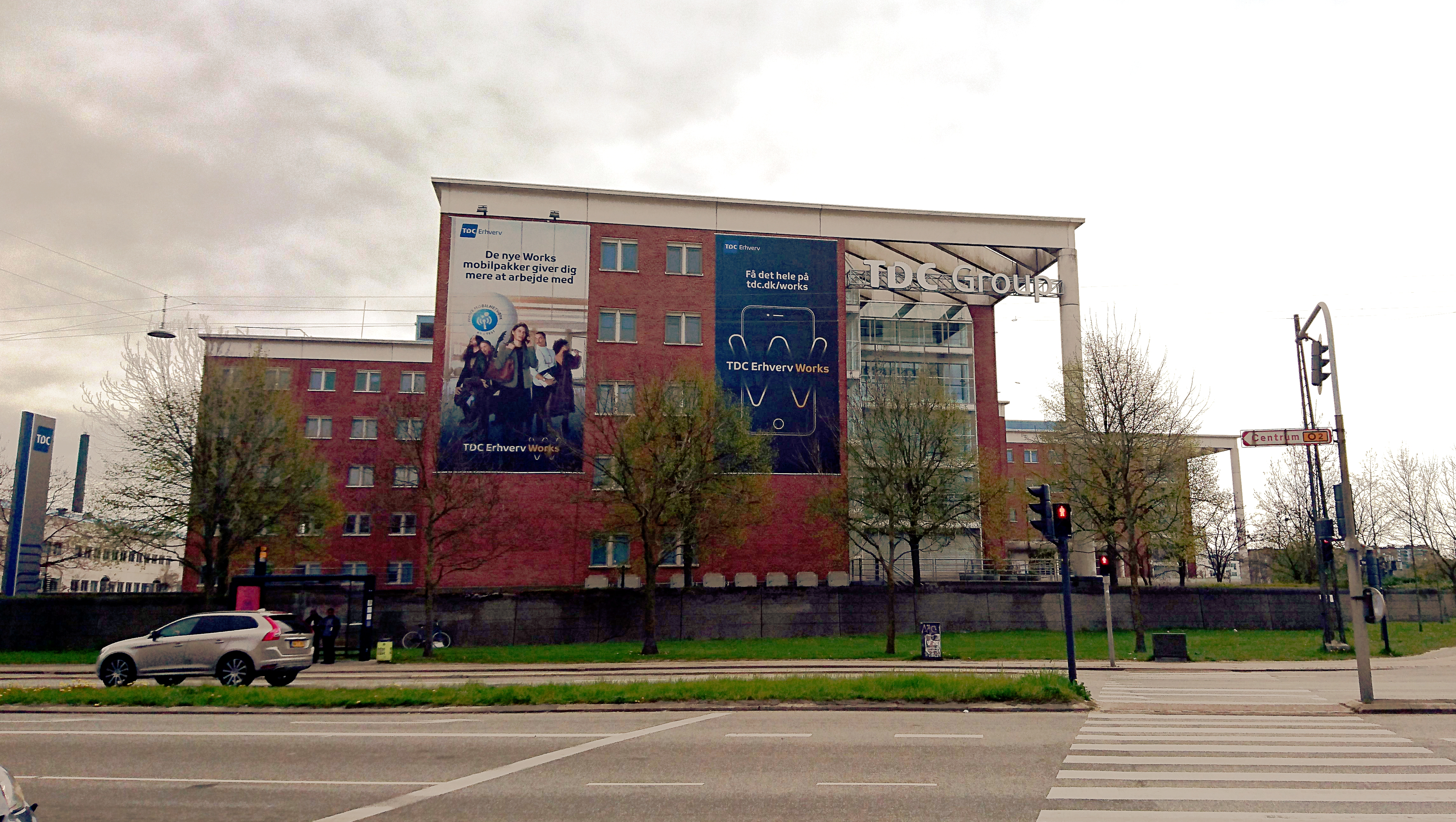
TDC, YouSee headquarters in Sydhavnen, Copenhagen.

TDC Holding A/S or TDC Group (formerly Tele Danmark Communications) is a Danish telecommunications company dating back to 1879. TDC Group is the largest telecommunications company in Denmark. The company's headquarters are located in Copenhagen.

TDC Holding is the holding company of two separate companies which were spun-off from TDC; Nuuday A/S and TDC NET A/S. All consumer related services and brands were placed under Nuuday, and the ownership and maintenance of physical infrastructure of mobile antennas as well as coax and fibre optical lines were placed under TDC NET.

== History ==
=== Early history ===
In 1879, Kjøbenhavns By- og Hustelegraf was established by telegraph engineer Severin Lauritzen and telegraphist Th. Thaulow. The company set up private telephone lines over shorter distances, for example between offices and factories. In addition, it offered telegraph service in Copenhagen using small telegraph stations around the city that could communicate by telephone.

In 1881, the International Bell Telephone Company, the European subsidiary of the American Bell Telephone Company, set up its first telephone exchange on Lille Kongensgade in Copenhagen, serving 22 business customers. On 21 August 1882, Carl Frederik Tietgen acquired the Danish operations of International Bell Telephone Company for DKK 200,000 and founded Kjøbenhavns Telefon-Selskab (KTS), later Kjøbenhavns Telefon Aktieselskab (KTAS).

In 1927, the Post- og Telegrafvæsenet (P&T; lit. the Postal and Telegraph Service) was created as Denmark's government-run postal, telegraph and telephone service, from a merger of the Danish Post Office and the Danish Telegraph Service. Reforms to the P&T from 1986 led to it being split into one Directorate-General and six state-owned enterprises.

=== Expansion and merger ===
In November 1990, the Folketing passed a law that paved the way for a nationwide Danish telecom, spun out from the P&T. The company was named Tele Danmark and was the parent company for the existing regional companies (KTAS, Jydsk Telefon, Tele Sønderjylland, Fyns Telefon, and Rigstelefonen).

In 1995, the regional companies were merged into Tele Danmark, and the first nationwide cable TV company, Tele Danmark Kabel TV was created. Five years later, in 2000, Tele Danmark changed its name to TDC.

During the late 1990s and early 2000s, TDC developed from a traditional and mainly Danish provider of landline and mobile telephony services into a Danish-based European provider of communications. Deregulation of the Danish telecommunications market in 1996 created a highly competitive market. In January 2000, TDC got a new logo with five ovals in red, yellow, green, turquoise and blue colour. In December 2000 Tele Danmark changed its name to TDC. At the same time it demerged into a parent holding company and a number of subsidiaries with the purpose of increasing customer focus, creating greater transparency and achieving faster time to market for products and services. In 2004, the Danish telecommunications market was fully liberalized. TDC was partly privatized in 1994 and fully privatized in 1998, and at year-end 2004, TDC's shares were held mainly by institutions and retail investors in Denmark, the United Kingdom and the United States.

In 2006 TDC adopted a new logo which consists of a cursive rounded-rectangle in blue colour. The text "TDC" appears in the rectangle and remind that the letter "D" is cut a little bit. A group of private equity firms under the banner Nordic Telephone Company (NTC) offered to buy TDC for a price of about 9.1 billion Euro. Among the group were companies such as Blackstone, Permira, Apax Partners and KKR. The company bought 88% of the shares, but failed to buy more than 90% of the shares and was thus unable to remove the company completely from the Copenhagen Stock Exchange. Also in 2006, TDC pulled out of the UK mobile telephone market, with the closure of their joint venture with EasyGroup, EasyMobile, which had launched in 2004.

In 2007, TDC folded its subsidiaries back into the parent company with the exception of TDC Kabel TV, which continued as an independent legal identity. Later in the year, on 1 October 2007, TDC Kabel TV changed its name to YouSee to signal a focus on more than just TV. In 2010 Nordic Telephone Company (NTC) began the process of selling its shares in TDC on the Copenhagen Stock Exchange, initially reducing its 88 percent holding of the company to less than 60 percent. In 2012, TDC had a total revenue of 26 billion DKK, and employed around 9,000 people in Denmark. In 2014, TDC purchased the Norwegian telecommunications firm Get AS for 12.5 billion DKK.

=== Recent years ===
In 2016, TDC purchased Danish IT- and telecom provider Cirque A/S for an unspecified amount. On 1 July 2016 the TDC consumer business was merged with YouSee, migrating the entire TDC customer base of IPTV, broadband and mobile consumers to YouSee. The mobile phone network continues to use the 'TDC' name, as its built by TDC Group instead of YouSee. TDC Group and Modern Times Group announced on 1 February 2018 a plan for TDC Group to buy MTG Nordics to create a converged business with a new name and brand. A week later, a takeover bid from the Australian infrastructure group Macquarie and three Danish pension funds; PFA, PKA and ATP was leaked to the public, which TDC had rejected. The consortium clarified that the proposed MTG merger was not part of their strategy. In February the consortium launched an improved take-over offer, which TDC Group now recommended. The proposed MTG merger was called off. The consortium got EU approval for their takeover bid on 28 March 2018. In early April, the consortium announced they had acquired more than 90% of the total shares of TDC Group, making a delisting possible. On 20 January 2020, TDC announced that their lower-cost flanker brand Fullrate would be shut down and the customers be migrated to YouSee.

== See also ==
- Danish telephone plug
- Radio 2 (Denmark)
- List of mobile network operators in Europe
