= Mofibo =

Ebook platform

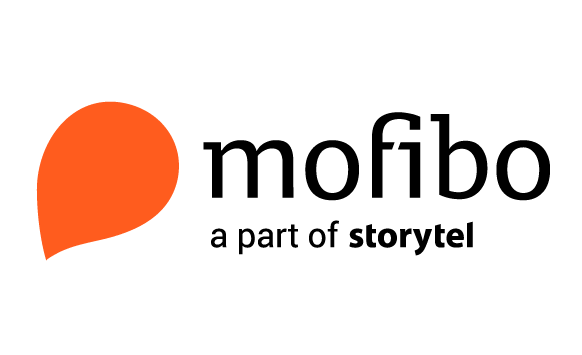
- Website type: Book platform
- Available in: Danish, English, Swedish
- Founded: Copenhagen, Denmark
- Key people: Per Dahlberg
- Website: mofibo.com
- Registration: required
- Launched: 2013

Mofibo is a subscription based e-book and audiobook platform, making titles available for its readers for a monthly fee. Mofibo is currently the largest distributor and reading platform for e-books in Denmark, and growing rapidly in Sweden.

The technology of Mofibo enables users to browse and discover new books on their own, or get recommendations from Mofibo's editors. All choices are recorded, consequently enabling the platform to recommend books to the reader, based on reading habits and tastes.

== History ==
Mofibo was founded in Denmark in 2013 by serial entrepreneur Morten Strunge. In 2014, Mofibo partnered with a number of ITC-providers, among them TDC A/S, in offering e-books to their clients. This boosted Mofibo's client base with app. 10.000 new prospective readers over night. The establishment of Mofibo has caused a budding revolution in the publishing industry, sparking debate about "subscription reading", and causing the largest publishing houses to invest further in availing its full book portfolio as e-books. During 2014, the Mofibo platform was expanded to cater for the Swedish book market as well as the Danish. The company is planning to expand its offerings to further markets in 2016.

== Book offerings ==
The platform currently includes book titles in Danish, Swedish, Arabic and English, both in writing and audio. Book titles from a vast array of publishing houses, among them Gyldendal, Norstedts, HarperCollins, Lindhardt og Ringhof, Simon & Schuster are currently offered in the platform.
