= Francis Ngai =

Hong Kong entrepreneur and venture philanthropist

Ngai Wah Sing Francis
- Born: Hong Kong
- Education: City University of Hong Kong
- Occupations: Founder and Chief Executive Officer of Social Ventures Hong Kong
- Organization(s): Green Monday, RunOurCity, Playtao Foreverland, Asia Venture Philanthropy Network, The Good Lab, Global Dignity Hong Kong

Ngai Wah Sing Francis (Chinese: 魏華星) is a Hong Kong entrepreneur and venture philanthropist. He is the Founder and CEO of Social Ventures Hong Kong (SVhk), a venture philanthropic organisation, and co-founded several Hong Kong social enterprises, including Green Monday, RunOurCity and Playtao Foreverland. He currently serves as a board member of the Asia Venture Philanthropy Network.

Ngai was recognised as The Purpose Economy's 100 Asia Pioneers in 2014, a Young Global Leader of the World Economic Forum in 2012 and chosen as one of Hong Kong's Ten Outstanding Young Persons in 2011.

Ngai graduated from the City University of Hong Kong and was conferred as an Honorary Fellow by the university in 2013. He is also an avid marathoner.

== Career ==
Ngai began his career in marketing and advertising before joining a listed technology conglomerate in Hong Kong, where he was Assistant Vice-president and Head of Strategy.

He founded venture philanthropic organisation, SVhk, in 2007 to incubate and invest in social enterprises in Hong Kong. In his capacity at SVhk, Ngai co-founded social enterprises Green Monday, RunOurCity and Playtao Foreverland, and serves on the board of the Asia Venture Philanthropy Network, Global Dignity's Hong Kong chapter and co-working space The Good Lab.

Ngai has served as a visiting university lecturer on social entrepreneurship and innovation. He has also delivered talks at events hosted by TEDxYouth@HongKong, the Harvard Club Hong Kong, USAID, Social Enterprise Summit, the Asia Future Enterprise Forum and UK Trade & Investment.

== Awards and recognition ==
Social entrepreneurship and innovation

Year	Organisation	Award
2014	The Purpose Economy	100 Asia Pioneers
2014	Hong Kong Spirit Ambassadors	2014 Spirit Ambassador
2012	World Economic Forum	Young Global Leader
2012	The Hong Kong Management Association and TVB	HKMA/TVB Awards for Marketing Excellence – Distinguished Marketing Leadership Award
2011	Junior Chamber International (Hong Kong)	Ten Outstanding Young Persons

Completed ultra-marathons

Year	Event
2014	Sundown Ultra-Marathon in Singapore
2013	The North Pole Marathon
2012	The Gobi March, part of the 4 Deserts race series
