= Kunde (surname) =

Kunde is a Germanic surname with origins in Bohemia and Silesia. It is borne by individuals in Germany, Austria, Switzerland, the Netherlands, the Scandinavian countries, the United States, Australia and other countries.

Identically or similarly spelled but non-derivative surnames are found in India and various African countries.. Kunde is also one of the surnames of Maratha community which hails from Maharashtra, a state of India.

Notable people with the surname include:

- Eduardo Kunde (born 1997), Brazilian footballer
- Emmanuel Kundé (1956–2025), Cameroonian footballer
- Gregory Kunde (born 1954), American operatic tenor
- Karl-Heinz Kunde (1938–2018), German cyclist
- Kenneth Kunde (1916–1992), American politician
- Pierre Kunde (born 1995), Cameroonian footballer

== See also ==
- Kunde (disambiguation)
