= David Yeung =

Hong Kong entrepreneur (born 1976)

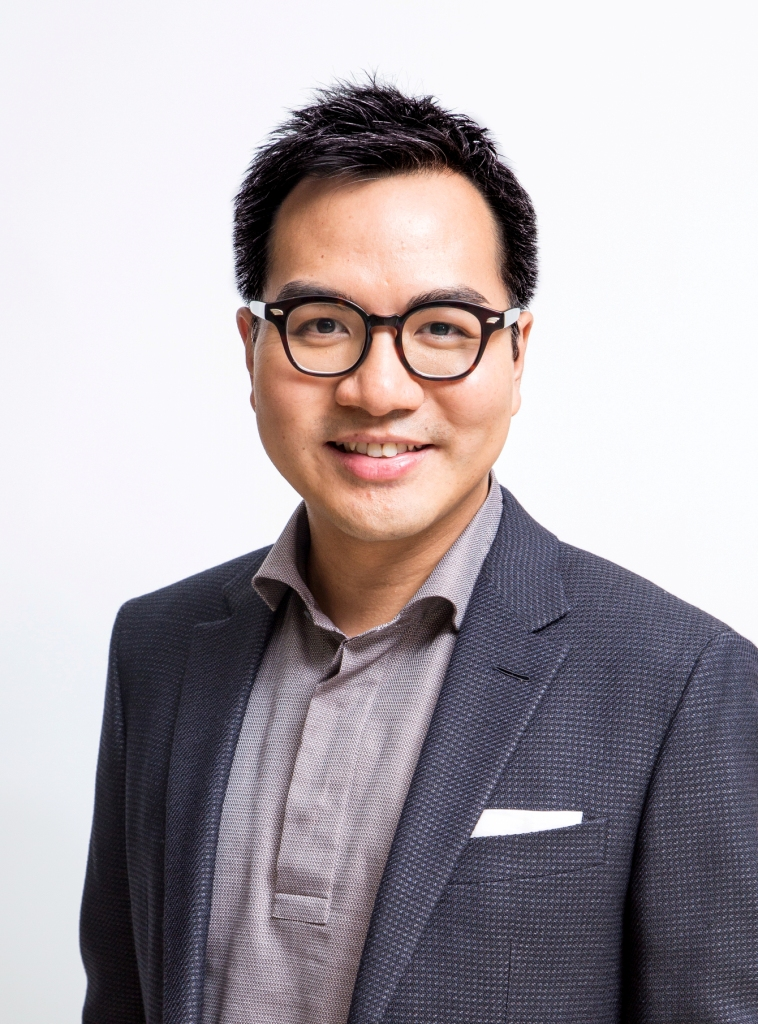
- Born: August 1976 (age 50); Hong Kong
- Education: Columbia University
- Occupations: Founder and CEO of Green Monday
- Parent: 楊洪

David Yeung Chun Ip is the co-founder of Green Monday. He used to be the host of the Hong Kong Metro Finance and Economics Channel, and also served as a guest on TV programs, including wireless, Cable, NowTV and Phoenix Satellite TV. In addition, Yang has been invited to give lectures on Buddhism, soul and environmental protection for many Fortune 500 companies and universities, and was selected as the 2015 Hong Kong Top Ten Outstanding Youth by the International Youth Chamber of Commerce, "JMEN" awarded "Men of the Year 2013" award, Ming Pao Weekly "2013 Local Heroes" award, Hong Kong Management Association "2013 Outstanding Market Illustration" Bronze Award, East Weekly "2013 Outstanding Enterprise Illustration" award, Roadshow "Green Star" Environmental Protection Award, Baccarat Magazine's 45 young leaders in Hong Kong, "Purpose Economy" "Asia's 100 Outstanding Leaders", Fast Company "China Business 100 Most Creative People", U Magazine My Favorite Hong Kong Environmental Figure 2016, etc.

== Education ==
Yeung graduated from Columbia University in the United States in 1998 with a B.S. degree.

== Career ==
Yeung started his career as a consultant for Wing Dao Certified Public Accountants in the United States. In 2003, he returned to Hong Kong from the United States and joined a family-owned company.

Yeung is the founder of Green Monday. Yeung is also the founder of OmniFoods.

== Awards ==
- 2018 Social Entrepreneur of the Year award. Presented at the World Economic Forum.
- 2020 EY Entrepreneur of the Year China awards. Presented by Ernst & Young.
