= Soulaima Gourani =

Danish Moroccan CEO, corporate advisor and writer

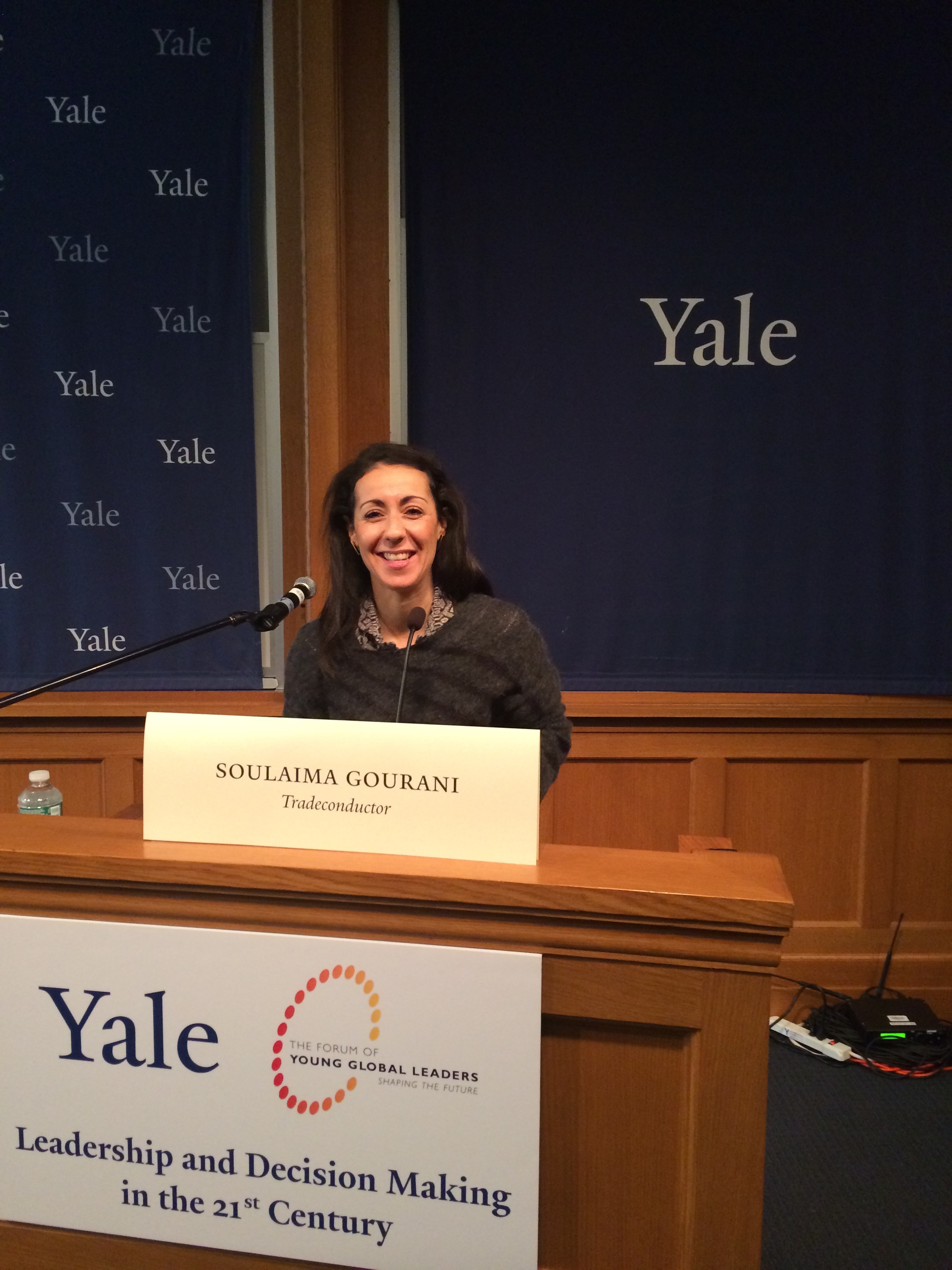
Soulaima Gourani at Yale University graduation, 2014

Soulaima Gourani (born 1975) is a Danish Moroccan CEO, corporate advisor and author who lives in Palo Alto, California.

== Early life and education ==
Soulaima was born in Safi, Morocco, in 1975 but moved to Denmark shortly after with her parents. Gourani grew up in different small towns in Jutland, where she struggled to fit in as she was the only one with an exotic name and a darker skin color. She was told by her teachers that she shouldn't expect to achieve much in life because of her gender, skin colour, and name. She decided to move out at the age of 13.

She has continued educating herself by completing several courses at international universities, including: The Global Leadership and Public Policy in the 21st Century at Harvard University (2014), Innovations and Lessons from Emerging Markets, A South Asia Perspective at the Indian School of Business (ISB). Later she took an MBA at Copenhagen Business School.

== Career ==
Soulaima Gourani has been employed in international companies such as A.P. Møller Maersk Group and Hewlett-Packard. In 2007 she was fired whilst pregnant and to make a living she set up her own business, Soulaima Art, which offers lectures and counselling. Since then she has developed her business and is also an investor and author of the books; "Ignite your career", "Take control of your career", and "Courage to success".

Soulaima Gourani is on a number of boards, including Global Dignity, whose Danish organization she founded in 2012. On November 1, 2016, she joined Global Dignity's'. Global Executive Board in New York and The Miracle Foundation. She is a member of the jury of Global Teacher Prize and appointed an Expert in Behavioural Sciences Education and Skills for the World Economic Forum. Gourani has also taught at Global Entrepreneurship at Harvard University.

Honors and Awards

In 2010 Gourani was nominated as one of the best Danish keynote speakers by One2Speak. In 2012 she was announced as one of the Young Global Leaders by World Economic Forum and later that year named to be the chairwoman of the non-profit organisation Global Dignity. In 2013 she was announced as one of the greatest thinkers in the Nordic by Nordic Business Forum and in 2014 chosen as one of the "40 under 40" European young leaders.

In 2015 she received the ”Womenomics Influencer Award”. She was elected as a TED mentor in 2016 and was later that year announced as one of the "Inspiring 50 Nordics" women in the tech-sector and a UN Women Ambassador Advisor.

In 2018 she was appointed to Jury of EY Entrepreneur of the Year. Gourani's story was included in the Danish biographical dictionary Kraks Blå Bog.

In public debate

She has argued on society's immigration challenge at forums. She is often interviewed about her own experiences as a professional businesswoman and brought in as an expert career advisor for entrepreneurs and professionals worldwide. She is currently a columnist at two Danish national newspapers, Jyllandsposten.dk and Berlingske.dk.

Key books published

- Take control of your career
- Courage to succeed
- Ignite your career: the new grads Bible
- Design your future
- Unready
