= Torben Andersen =

Danish economist (born 1957)

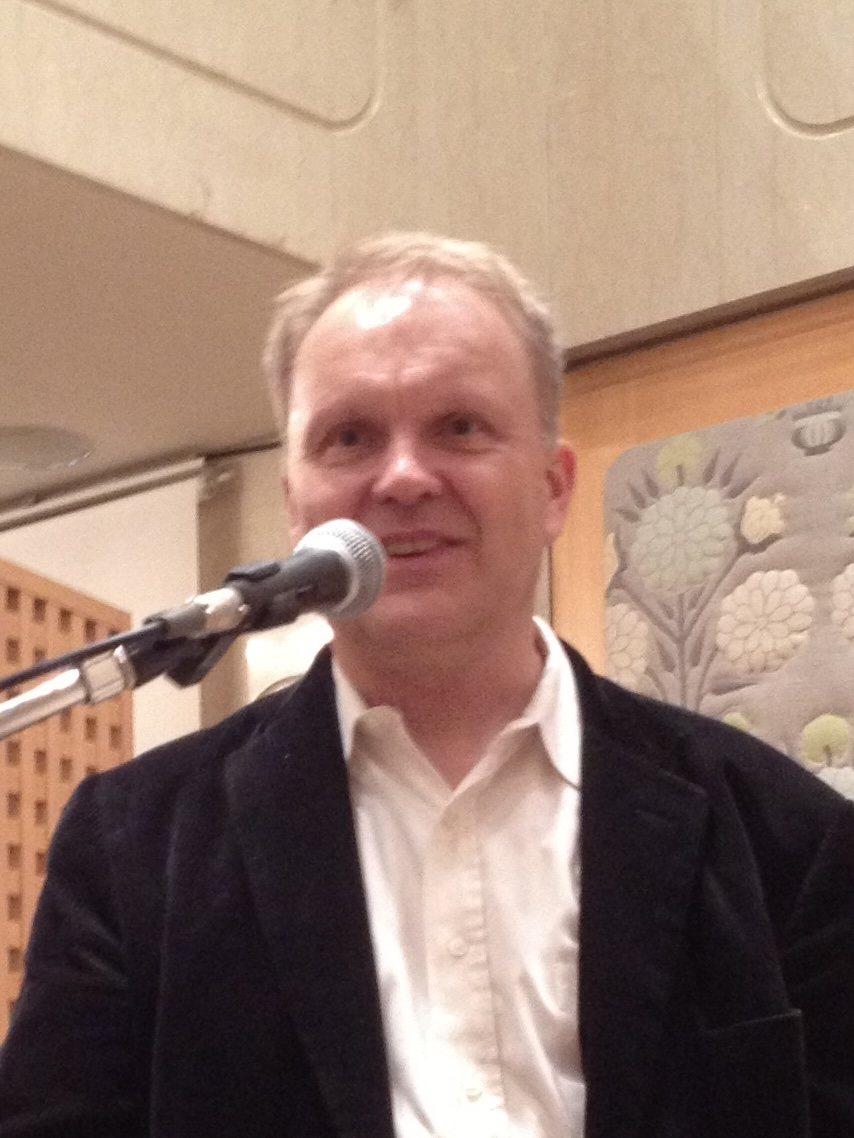
Torben Andersen

Torben Gustav Andersen (born November 26, 1957) is a Danish economist, currently the Nathan S. and Nancy S. Sharp Professor of Finance at Kellogg School of Management, Northwestern University. He also teaches finance at the EDHEC Business School (Ecole des Hautes Etudes Commerciales du Nord) in Lille. He is a fellow of the European Economic Association.
