= Euroinvestor =

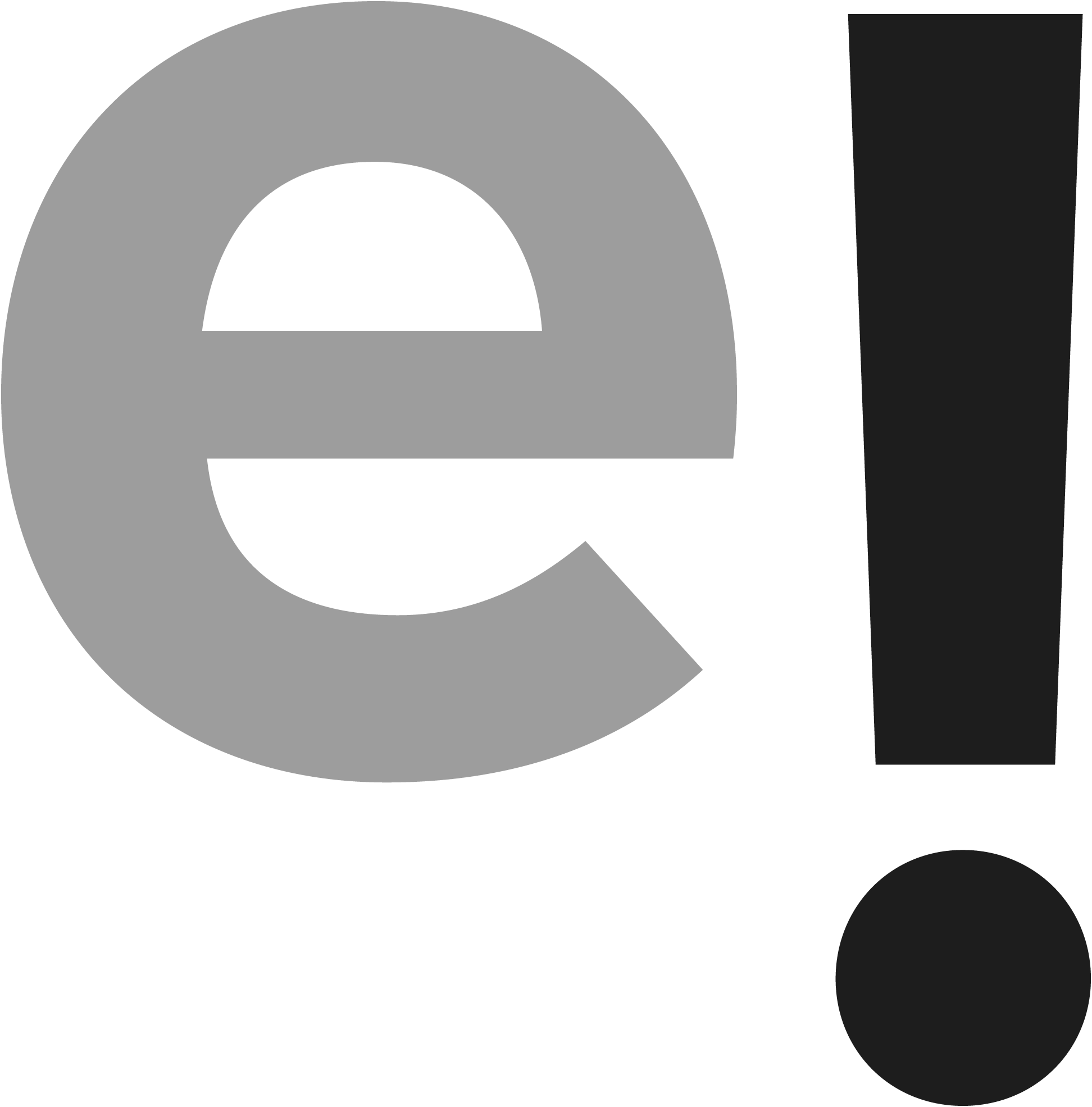
- Type: Online media
- Owner(s): Berlingske Media
- Founder(s): Søren and Jens Alminde
- Publisher: Berlingske Media
- Editor-in-chief: Simon Richard Nielsen
- Founded: 1997
- Website: euroinvestor.dk

Euroinvestor is a Danish financial media. According to Dansk Online Index (Danish Online Index) Euroinvestor is one of the largest financial media in Denmark and in the top 20 of the biggest Danish online medias. Euroinvestor had more than 12 million views in September 2021.

In 2020 Simon Richard Nielsen became the editor in chief of Euroinvestor.

With the starting point in their slogan“he, who knows the most, earns the most” Euroinvestor strives to become the largest independent financial media for private investors in Denmark.

== History ==
Established in 1997 by brothers Søren and Jens Almindes, the company had its initial public offering in 2007. In April 2011, Saxo Bank acquired a majority stake in Euroinvestor, and currently owns a 71.4% stake in the company. The founders hold a combined 20.1 percent share of the company, with the remaining 8.5 percent being publicly traded.

Euroinvestor was launched in 1997 by the brothers Søren and Jens Alminde. In 2018 Berlingske Media bought Euroinvestor including the domains euroinvestor.com, euroinvestor.dk and valutakurser.dk for 23 mio. DKK.

== Company ==
Euroinvestor.com A/S is the majority owner of the Danish real estate website Boliga, but announced in September 2012 that it would take steps to sell its 50.3 percent share. In the first half of 2012, the company had a revenue of DKK 10.99 million and posted a deficit of DKK 2.3 million.

In 2018 Berlingske Media bought Euroinvestor including the domains euroinvestor.com, euroinvestor.dk and valutakurser.dk for 23 mio. DKK.

== Content ==
Euroinvestor writes about stocks, finance and markets, and they publish the podcast Millionærklubben (the Millionaire Club) which is one of the most listened podcasts in Denmark according to Podcastindex.

On the site the user has access to real time stocks for free. The user can also create a portfolio and set a watch list for stocks he or she owns or wants to follow.

Furthermore, the site valutakurser.dk is part of Euroinvestor and was one of the domains Berlingske Media bought in 2018.

Euroinvestor publishes its own podcast including the popular podcast Millionærklubben (the Millionaire Club). It’s one of the most listened podcasts in Denmark.
