= Danske Spil =

National lottery in Denmark

Current logo of Danske Spil

Danske Spil A/S is the national lottery in Denmark, founded in 1948. The first game was established May 8, 1949 and was a 1-X-2 TOTO game with 12 football matches. Today Danske Spil A/S, previously known as Dansk Tipstjeneste A/S, offers a number of games: Number games, instant games, knowledge games and gambling on machines.

== The licence ==
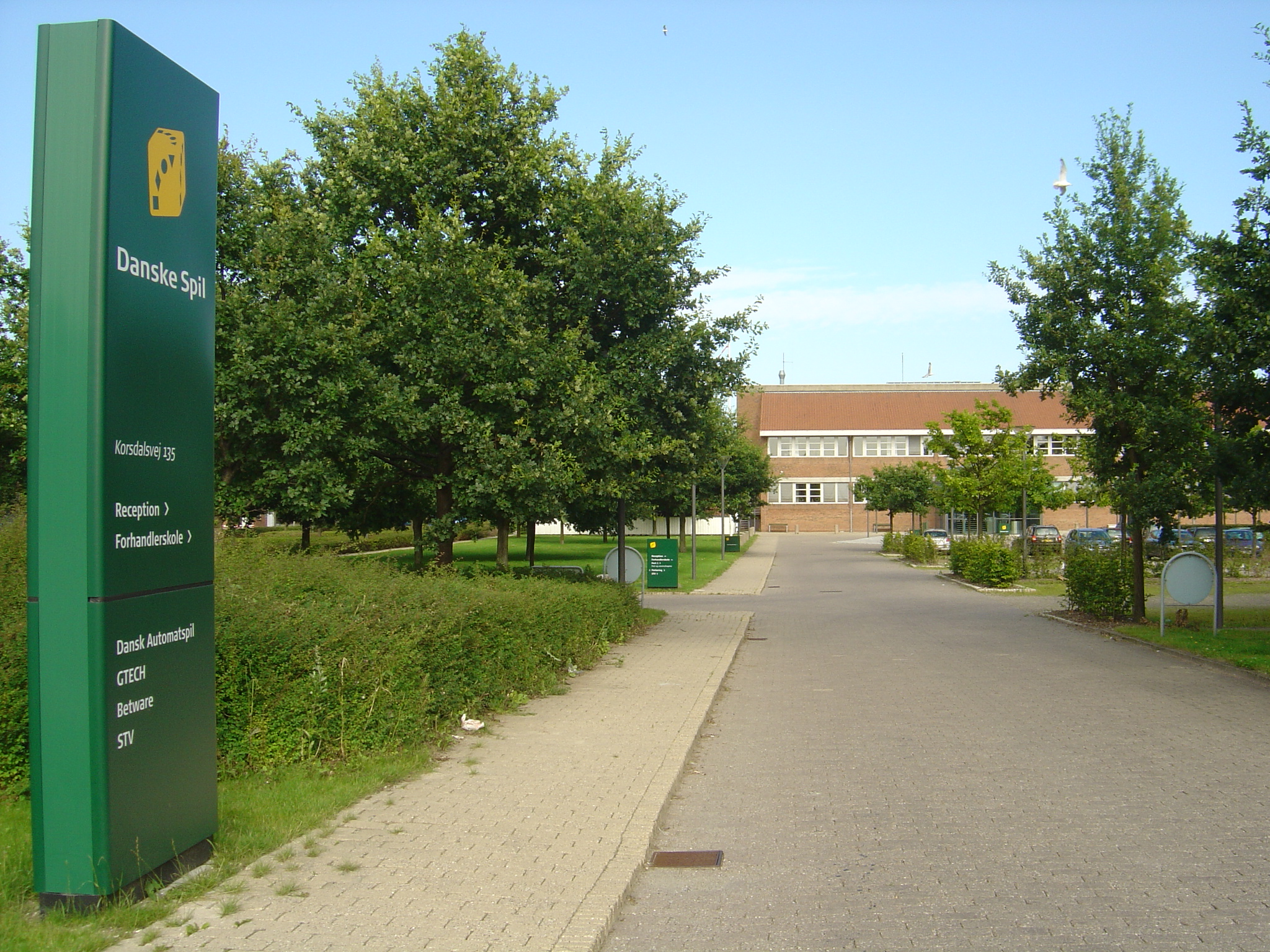
Danske Spil administration offices in Brøndby.

The license forms the basis for Danske Spils activities and is issued to Danske Spil for 1 year at a time. In accordance with the license, Danske Spil is obliged to act as a supplier of popular and attractive gaming products, which channel demand for the gaming permitted by law into controlled and ethical frameworks. Danske Spil must furthermore not develop new games or marked to an extent which exceed what's necessary to fulfil this obligation

=== Distribution of the share capital ===
- The Danish State: 80%
- The Danish Sports Confederation and Olympic Committee: 10%
- Danish Gymnastics and Sports Associations: 10%

=== The board of directors ===
- 10 Board members appointed by ministries and organisations
- 5 Board members selected by the employees

=== Distribution of profit ===
Profits from the games are distributed as provided for by the Danish Parliament (Folketinget) for the benefit of athletics, culture and other purposes for the good of general public

=== After the liberalisation in 2012 ===
On January 1, 2012, Denmark was one of the first countries in Europe to liberate the market for gambling. Until then only Danske Spil had a license in Denmark, but the law was only working in theory. After the liberalisation Danske Spil had to compete with other gambling companies like Ladbrokes and Bet365, but Danske Spil kept some of their exclusive rights. Example: Danske Spil is the only company in Denmark, which is allowed to offer gambling involving only luck excluding casino games. This means that scratch cards, bingo and so on only can be offered by Danske Spil.

== Infrastructure ==
Danske Spil's sports betting platform is based on Openbet software.
