= Christian Stadil =

Danish executive and chairman

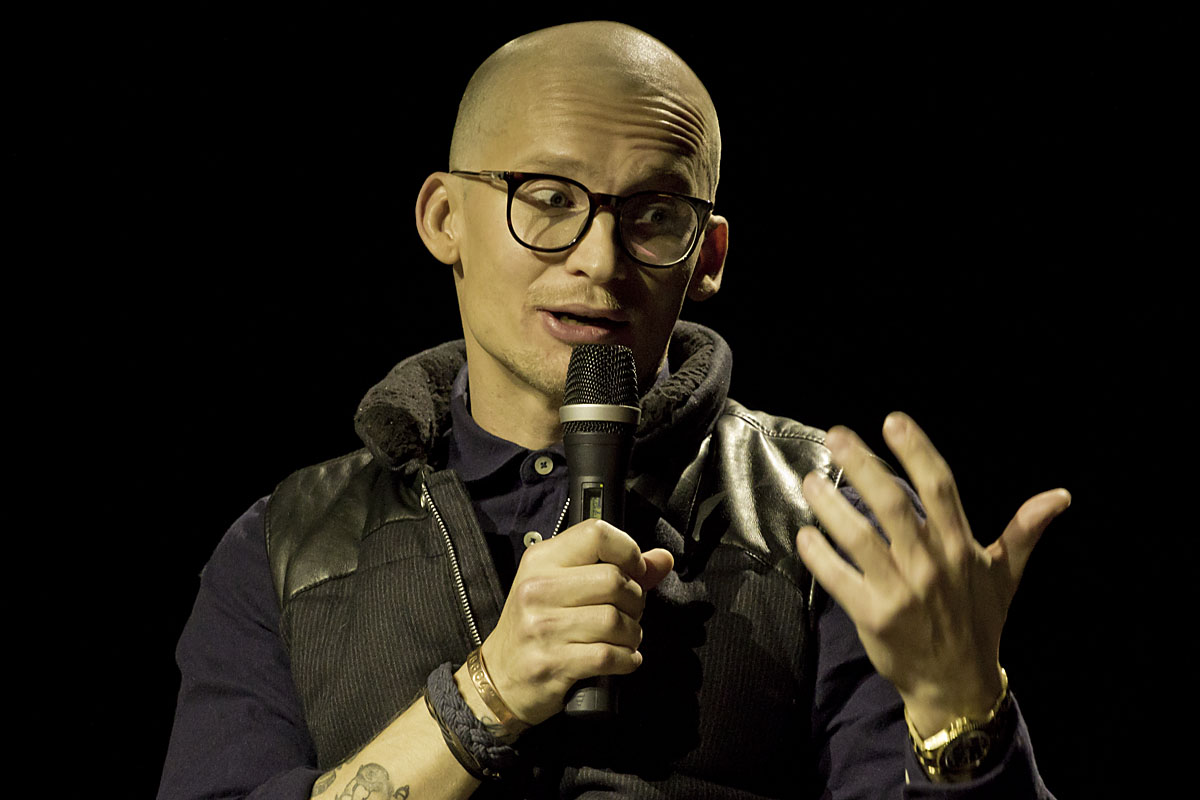
- Born: November 9, 1971 (age 54)
- Known for: owner of Hummel International
- Website: www.christianstadil.com

Christian Nicholas Stadil (born 9 November 1971) is a Danish executive and chairman. He owns the sports brand Hummel International, is CEO of Thornico Group and co-author of Company Karma. In 2014 he was appointed honorary professor of creative leadership at the Centre for Business Development and Management at Copenhagen Business School.

In 2015, Stadil began appearing as one of five "lions" on the investment TV show Løvens Hule ("Lions' Den"), the Danish version of the reality TV franchise Dragons' Den.
