= Danish telephone plug =

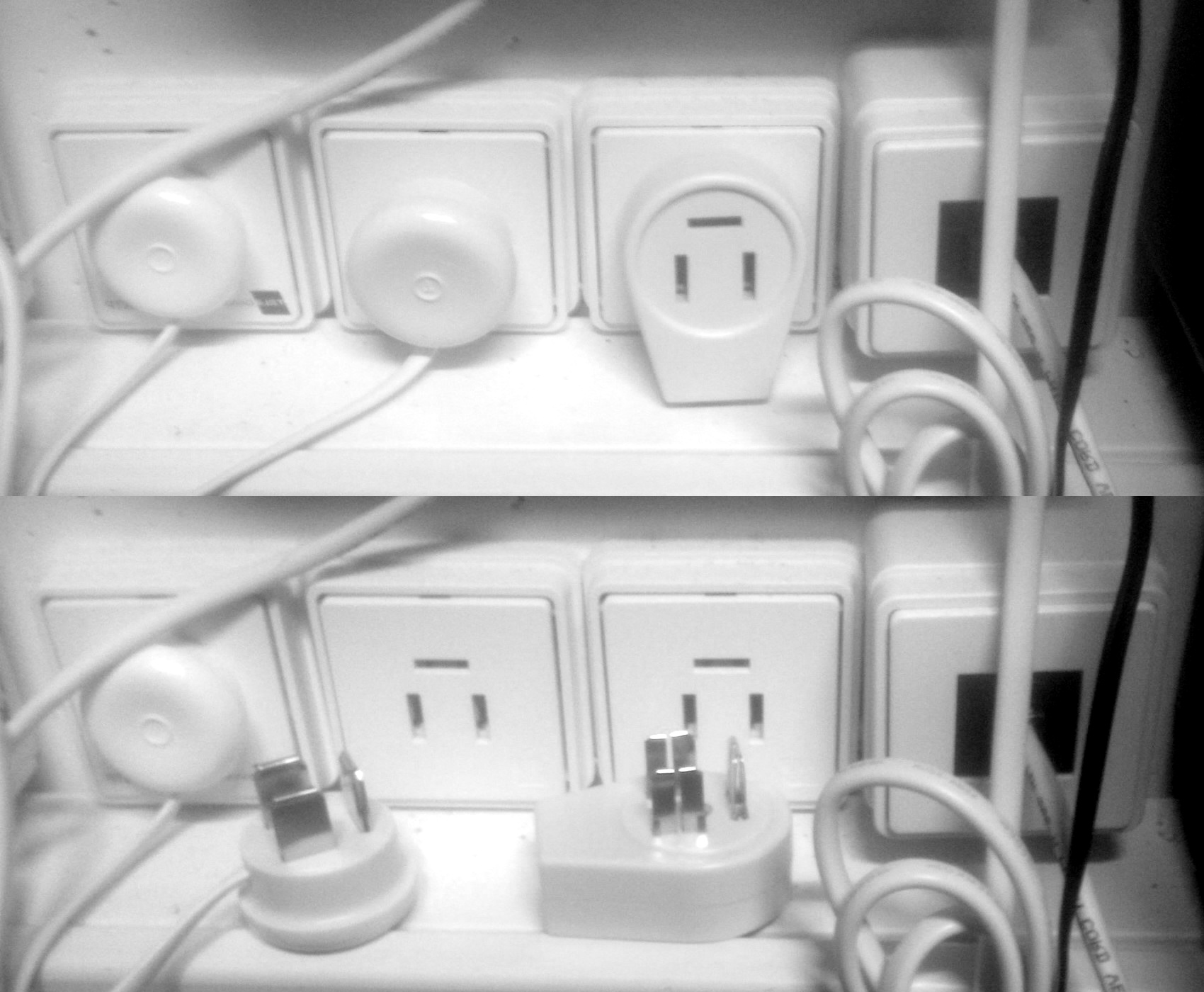
Danish Telephone plugs, from left to right: Shallow wall socket with modern thin plug, shallow wall socket with earlier 18mm plug, shallow wall socket with RJ11 Telephone adapter (doesn't fit due to cable duct below), normal size RJ11 wall socket with plug.

The Danish telephone plug is the special flat round telephone plug used in Denmark for POTS (analog) telephone lines and some "raw copper" (for ADSL etc.) telephone lines. The plug has 3 flat pins arranged at right angles to each other. This plug is used in few if any other places in the world, and most equipment now made uses the US/International RJ11 socket on the device end and includes either a cable with the Danish telephone plug at the wall end, or a standard RJ11 to RJ11 cable with a bundled Telephone Adapter.

== Technical description ==
The plug consists of two vertical and one horizontal flat pin, arranged like 3 sides (left, right and top) of a rectangle. The two vertical pins carry the same tip and ring signals used in other countries. The third pin (top, horizontal) used to be connected to ground and was occasionally used with switchboards, but is now generally unused and left unconnected.

Each pin is 12.5 millimetres (0.5 in) long, 10 millimetres (0.4 in) wide and about 2 millimetres (0.08 in) thick, compatible with one of the historic types of blade plugs. The two signal pins are 14 millimetres (0.55 in) apart while the ground pin is about 11 millimetres (0.4 in) above the center of the two signal pins.

In practice, 5 variants of the plug are currently being made:

- A completely flat wall socket (pictured) 50×50 millimetres (about 2×2 inches) with the 3 flat holes in the middle. This design matches the look, junction boxes etc. of other Danish wall outlets (such as those for AC power). It supersedes an earlier round model which had a slightly recessed circular depression where the plug goes. Sockets etc. based on this 50mm module may be densely packed on walls etc. both vertically and horizontally, so plugs with their cords etc. need to stay within a traditional 43 millimetres (1.7 in)(?) circle around the center to avoid collisions.
- A regular plug (pictured), with the 3 pins going into the wall and the handle part of the plug being a flat 28 millimetres (1.1 in) disc protruding only about 12 millimetres (0.5 in) from the socket. The telephone cable generally exits the plug at the bottom. The plug has a slightly larger diameter (33 millimetres (1.3 in)) for its outermost 5 millimetres (0.2 in), thus providing an easy grip. This design supersedes an earlier model which protruded about 18 millimetres (0.7 in) from the socket (pictured).
- A combination plug/socket, where each pin of the plug mechanically extends into the connecting part of each hole in the socket. The entire plug/socket is round and extends 18 millimetres (0.7 in) from the socket it is inserted into, making it the same size and shape as the earlier variant of the regular plug. The combination plug/socket also has the larger diameter at the outer (socket) edge for easier grip.
- A round socket used at the end of extension cables. This is also the same size and shape as the earlier variant of the regular plug, but there are no pins and the socket holes are on the side where the pins would otherwise be.
- A crudely made telephone adapter (pictured) which combines a combination plug/socket (as above) with an RJ11 socket in a single plastic housing. This mass-produced adapter has a larger diameter than its non-adapter cousins, for no apparent technical reason. As seen on the picture, this adapter fails to stay within the area of the socket, causing mechanical problems.

== History ==
Unlike in some other countries, this telephone plug was introduced long before any liberalization of the telephone market occurred. Until the mid-1980s, all legal telephone equipment with this plug was rented, purchased or at least approved from the regional telephone companies or (rarely) the government.

The three-pronged Danish telephone plug is a simplified form of an older five-pronged plug, where the two extra pins (vertical, above and further apart than the signal pins) connected to a customer premises long life battery that provided power for telephones before the introduction of "automatic dialing" (the ability to place calls without operator assistance).

Also in installations of similar age, a mechanical switch was sometimes installed behind the socket to allow manually switching the phone line between sockets in two locations within a building.
