= Peder Tuborgh =

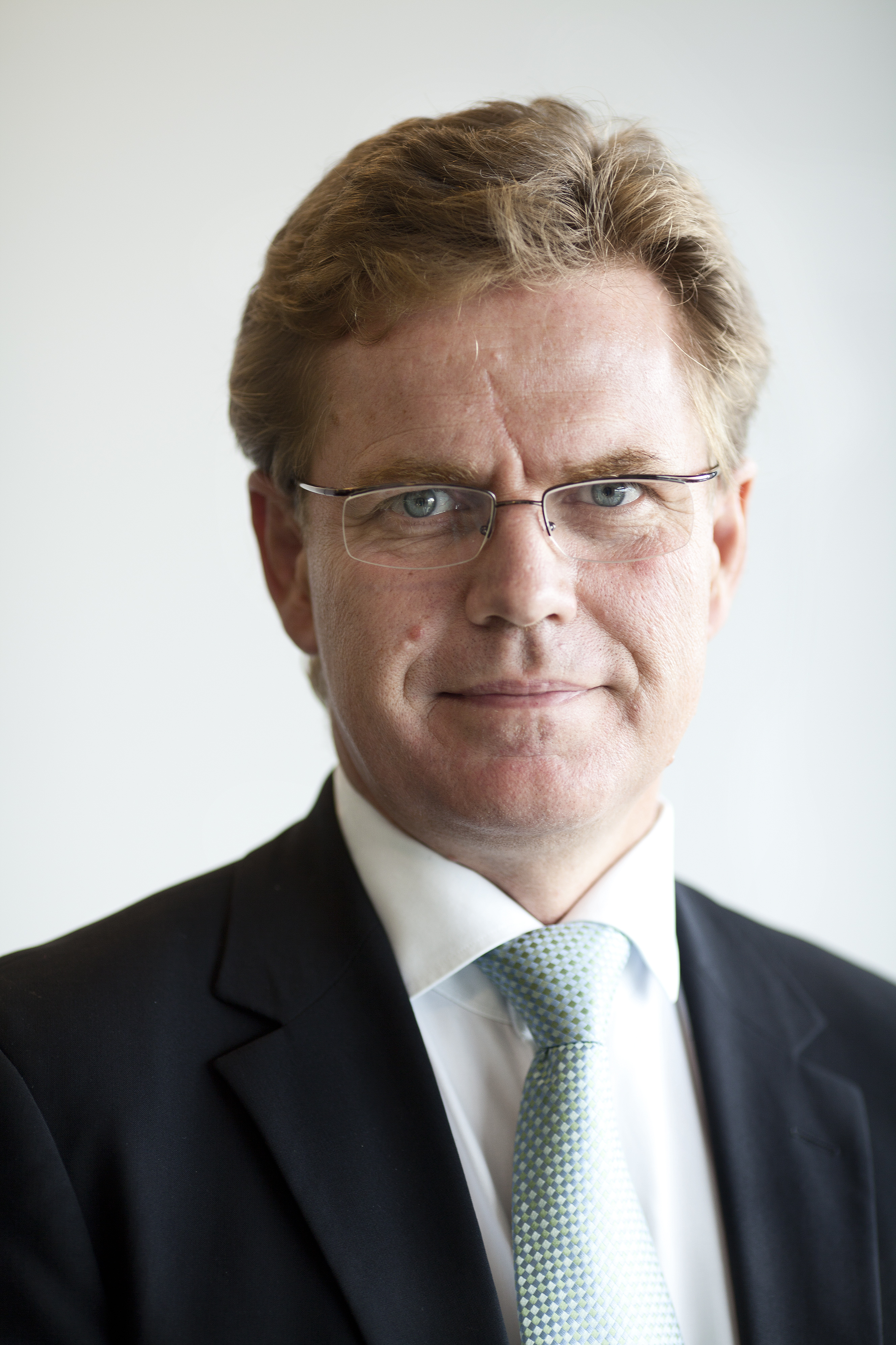
Peder Tuborgh in 2011

Peder Tuborgh (born 22 April 1963), also referred to as Peder Tuborgh, is the Chief Executive of the partly Danish multi-national dairy processing company Arla Foods.

== Early life ==
He was born in Skanderborg. He grew up in Rynkeby in the Faaborg-Midtfyn Municipality in the Region of Southern Denmark. He went to a gymnasium school in Vollsmose in Odense, the third largest city in Denmark. Odense is known for Hans Christian Andersen. He gained a BSc in Economics in 1985, and an MSc in Economics and Business Administration in 1987 from Odense University.

== Career ==
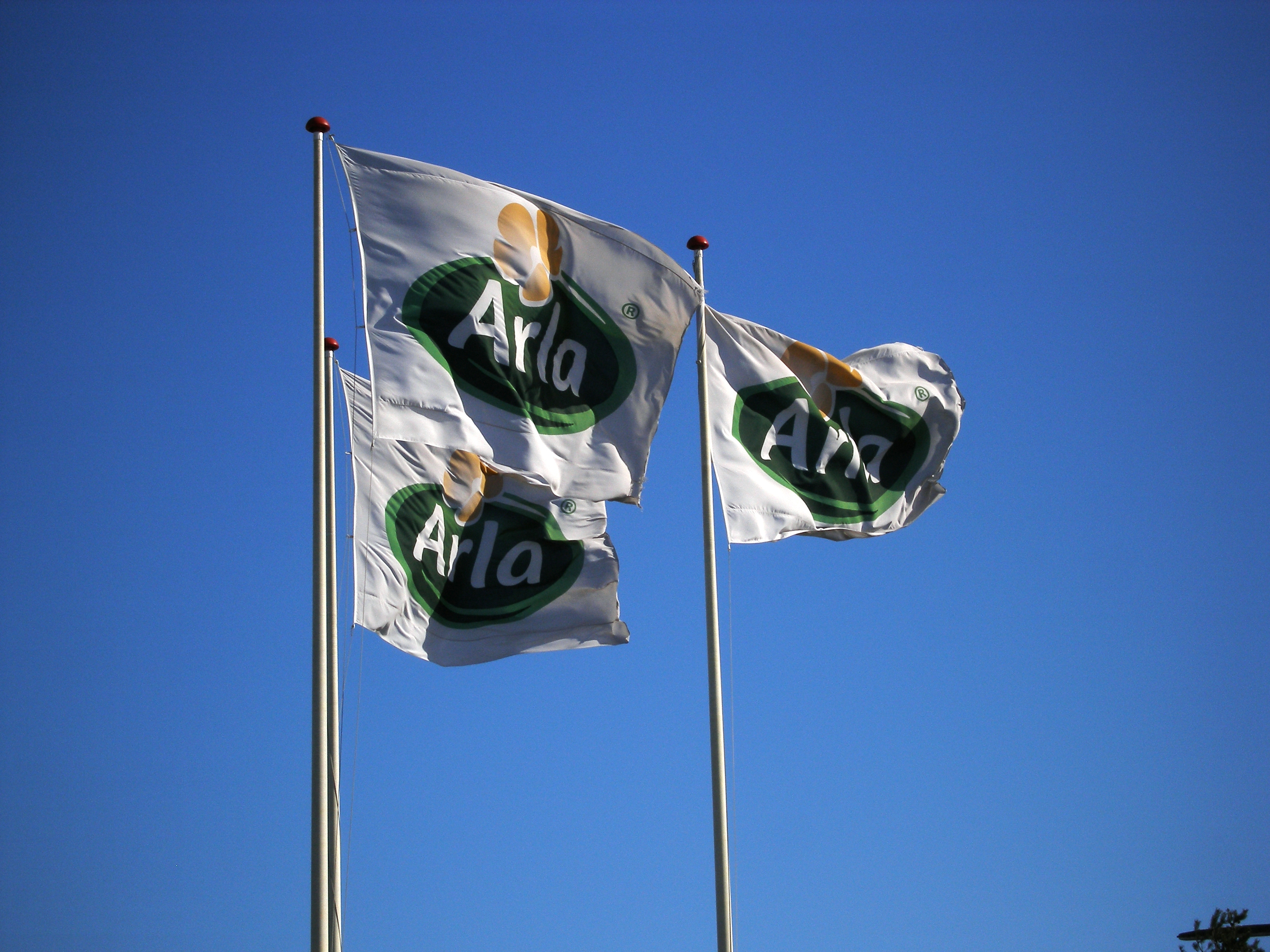
Arla Foods flag in 2011

=== Arla Foods ===
In 2002 he became head of the Nordic region of Arla Foods. He became the Chief Executive in 2005. Arla Foods is Europe's second largest dairy processing company by turnover, and the seventh largest dairy company in the world. Arla was formed in 2000.

Pandora A/S: Since 2014 Chairman of the Board

== See also ==
- Category:Dairy products companies of Denmark

Business positions
Preceded by Åke Modig	Chief Executive of Arla Foods; June 2005 -	Succeeded by Incumbent
