= Steen Riisgaard =

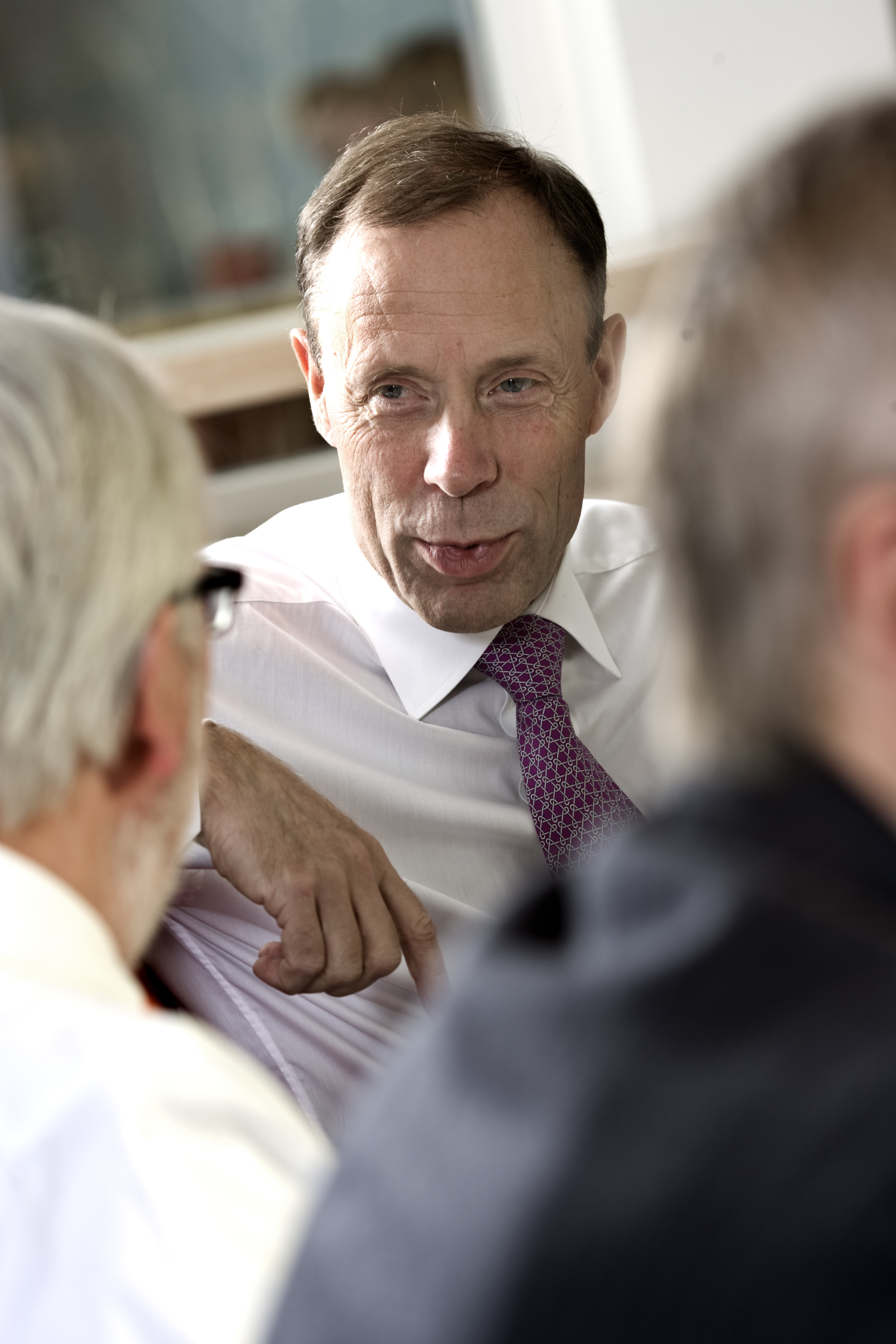
- Steen Riisgaard at a Novozymes board meeting December 2008
- Born: 22 March 1951 (age 74); Esbjerg, Denmark
- Education: University of Copenhagen, MSc in Microbiology, 1979
- Website: Novozymes.com

Steen Riisgaard (born 22 March 1951) is the former president and CEO of the Denmark-based biotech company Novozymes, the world’s largest producer of industrial enzymes. He held this position from when Novozymes was founded in a demerger from Novo Nordisk in 2000 until he left the company in 2013 when Peder Holk Nielsen became CEO.

== Early life and education ==
Steen Riisgaard was educated at the University of Copenhagen and holds an MSc in Microbiology from 1979. Protecting nature and the environment was a priority early on and Steen Riisgaard founded a local branch of the environmental organization Noah (Friends of the Earth, Denmark) in Ballerup, Denmark.

== Career ==
Riisgaard started his career as a research fellow at the Serum Institute of Denmark and a research microbiologist at Foss Electric, Denmark. In 1979, he joined Novo Nordisk in Enzymes Research & Development. In 1982 he moved to Tokyo to start up an Enzymes Research & Development unit in the Novo Nordisk subsidiary Novo Industri Japan Ltd. After his return to Denmark in 1985, he held a range of jobs in the company before he was promoted to Corporate Executive Vice President with special responsibility for Enzyme Business in 1989.

When Novozymes was spun off from Novo Nordisk in a demerger in 2000, Riisgaard was made President and CEO of the new company.

Riisgaard has said that an important motivation for working in Novozymes is the company's positive impact on the environment.

Riisgaard is chairman of WWF (World Wide Fund for Nature) Denmark, chairman of the board of trustees of Egmont Group and Rockwool International, and he serves on the board of EuropaBio.

== Biofuels and 'the bio-based society' ==
Riisgaard has supported advanced biofuels, for which Novozymes produces the essential enzymes, and called for politicians to support the industry with credit lines and loan guarantees. Steen Riisgaard has repeatedly stated that Novozymes would be ready in 2010 with the enzymes necessary to convert agricultural waste to fuel at a price level competitive with gasoline, and on February 16, 2010, he announced that the enzymes were ready. According to Steen Riisgaard, biofuels are the first step on the way to a 'bio-based society' in which 'sugar will be the new oil' and 'the basis for an entire new chemicals industry'. In the bio-based society, traditional oil-based technology, products and infrastructure will be replaced by biotechnology and renewable raw materials input:

"Riisgaard [...] says he imagines a future in which bio-refineries are dotted around the countryside producing fuels and other chemicals from biomass such as agricultural waste. [...] Riisgaard reckons that converting agricultural waste into other chemicals (including fuels) using industrial biotechnology could replace 20-25% of global oil consumption."

In January 2008, Novozymes announced a partnership with US agriculture giant Cargill to produce acrylic acid from renewable raw materials and in December 2009 the company announced a partnership with Brazilian petrochemical company Braskem to make polypropylene from sugarcane.
