= Danske Commodities =

Energy trading house

Coordinates: 56°8′58.61″N 10°12′23.99″E

Danske Commodities A/S
- Industry: Energy
- Founded: 23 September 2004
- Founder: Henrik Lind
- Headquarters: Aarhus, Denmark
- Key people: Jakob Sørensen (CEO); Helle Østergaard Kristiansen (Chair)
- Products: Power trading, gas trading and related services
- Revenue: EUR 2,425.51 million (2024)
- Operating income: EUR 162.67 million (2024)
- Number of employees: 600+ (2025)
- Website: danskecommodities.com

Danske Commodities (DC) is an energy trading house. The company is an international trader of energy-related commodities such as electric power, gas and climate market products with activities in 40+ countries.

== History ==
Danske Commodities was founded in September 2004 by Henrik Lind. The company started off with trading electricity across the border between Germany and Denmark, with the first trade implemented on 1 November 2004.

Building its foundation on trading on the ‘Day Ahead’ power market, Danske Commodities expanded into the intraday power trading market in 2007.

In 2009, gas trading and wholesale services, such as energy procurement for supply companies and management of volume and balancing risks, were added to the company's business activities. In 2011 the company added renewable services optimising the variable output from wind and solar. Today, the company has more than 12,000 MW of renewables under management.

In 2018, Danske Commodities announced it had been acquired by Norwegian energy company Equinor, with the acquisition being completed on 1 February 2019. Danske Commodities is a wholly owned subsidiary to Equinor, operating under its own name and brand.

Currently, Danske Commodities operates in 40+ power markets and 20+ gas markets, with a 24/7 trading setup. The company employs approximately 600 people, representing more than 40 nationalities. It is domiciled in Aarhus, Denmark, where it has its headquarters in the Akson Business Tower, and maintains a global presence with offices spanning five continents.

== Business areas ==
Danske Commodities’ business consists of two areas: trading and services.

TRADING

- Power - trades with power plants, utilities and trading houses and specialises in sustainable energy and emerging markets via exchange, broker or OTC trading on the intraday, day-ahead and forward markets. Danske Commodities trades standard futures, options and structured products and offers both physical or financial settlement and capacity auctions.
- Gas - trades via exchange, broker or OTC trading on the intraday, day-ahead and forward markets. Danske Commodities trades standard futures, options and structured products and offers both physical or financial settlement, capacity auctions and storage optimisation.

SERVICES

- Renewables - production management and balancing, production hedging from day ahead and up to 10+ years, Power Purchase Agreements (PPAs) on both standard and individually structured terms. Danske Commodities trades certificates such as GOOs, El-Certs, ROCs and REGOs and participates in the market for ancillary services.
- Conventionals - production management and balancing, production optimisation of heat and power, trading of certificates such as EUAs, EUAAs and CERs, hedging of fuels, subsidies and output to minimise price sensitivity and stabilise cash flow. Danske Commodities offers services on primary, secondary and tertiary markets for ancillary services.
- Supply - consumption management and balancing, consumption optimisation and hedging solutions to specific consumption profiles.
