= Green Monday (organization) =

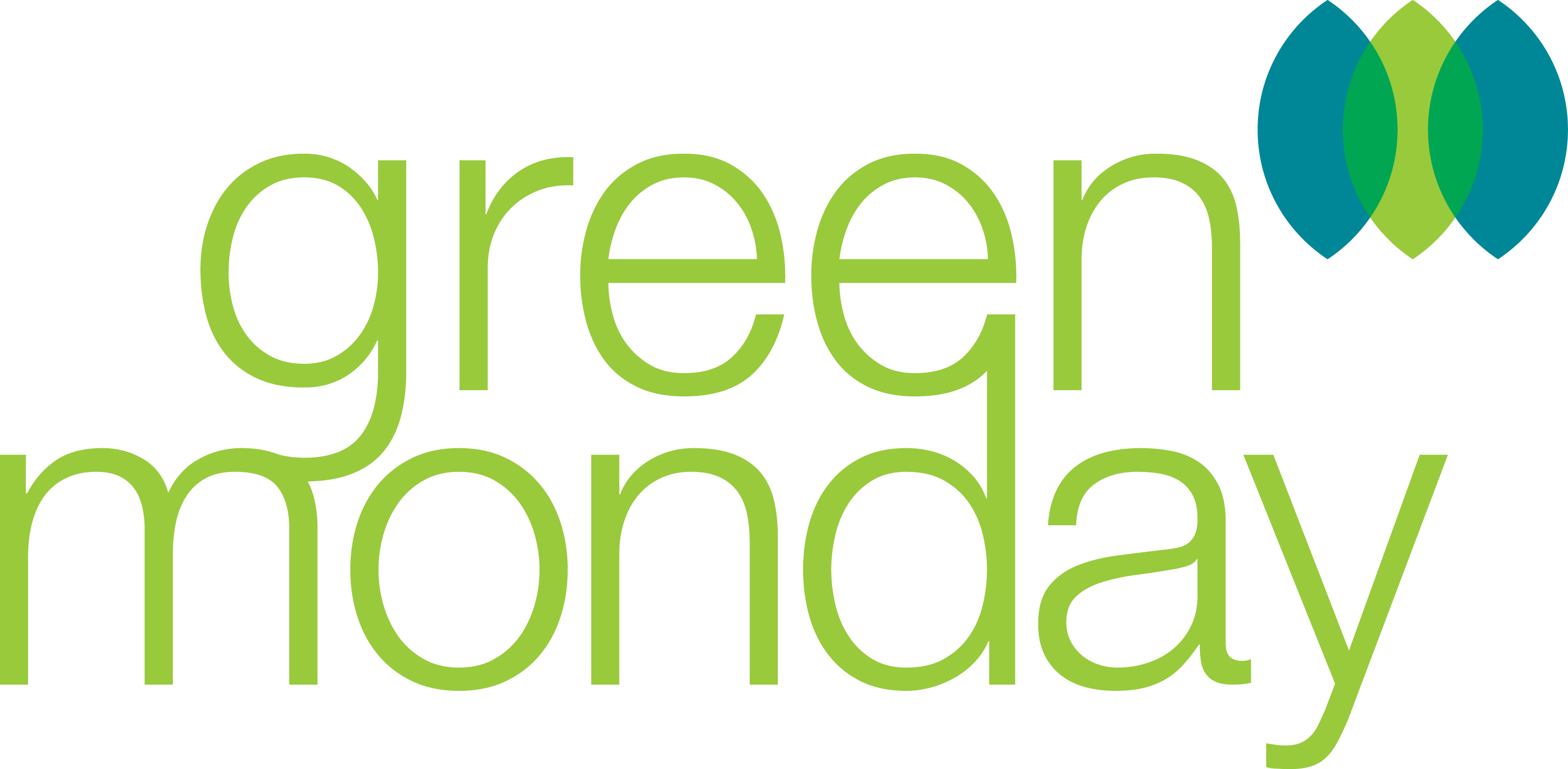
- Company type: Social enterprise
- Founded: Hong Kong （2012）
- Founder: David Yeung, Francis Ngai
- Headquarters: Hong Kong
- Website: http://www.greenmonday.org/

Green Monday (GM) is a startup that makes low-carbon and sustainable living simple. Founded in 2012 in Hong Kong, GM is aimed at tackling climate change and ensuring food security.

As of 2014, results of a survey by market research company Ipsos showed that 1.6 million Hong Kong people, or 23% of the city's total population, embrace "Green Monday" - an increase of 18% from 2012, and over 1,000 restaurants in Hong Kong are offering their menus.

== History ==
Green Monday started to grow beyond Hong Kong in 2014. Events that marked their international recognition and growth include:

- Columbia University became the first university in the US to launch Green Monday on their campus.
- Fast Company (magazine) named Green Monday among China's Top 50 Most Innovative Companies of Year 2014.
- The US Consulate of Hong Kong, the American Humane Society and the Italian Chamber of Commerce in Hong Kong became Green Monday's partners.
- Green Monday was launched at the Washington University in St. Louis in January 2015, becoming the second university in the US to join the program
- Green Monday's School Program has been sponsored by a local bank charitable foundation. As of 2014, more than 800 schools with about 600,000 students from kindergarten to university in Hong Kong pledged to observe "Green Monday".
- Green Monday Group is named 32nd in the Fortune's 2020 "Change the World" list, and 8th in the Fortune China's “20 Most Socially Influential Startups in China” list.
- Green Monday Holdings, part of the Green Monday Group, raised $70 million in financing from investors, including TPG’s The Rise Fund and the massive conglomerate Swire Pacific in September 2020.
- Minor Figures, a UK-based oat milk brand announced that they secured minority investments from Green Monday Holding and Danone Manifesto Ventures in June 2022.
