= Netcompany =

Danish publicly traded IT consultancy

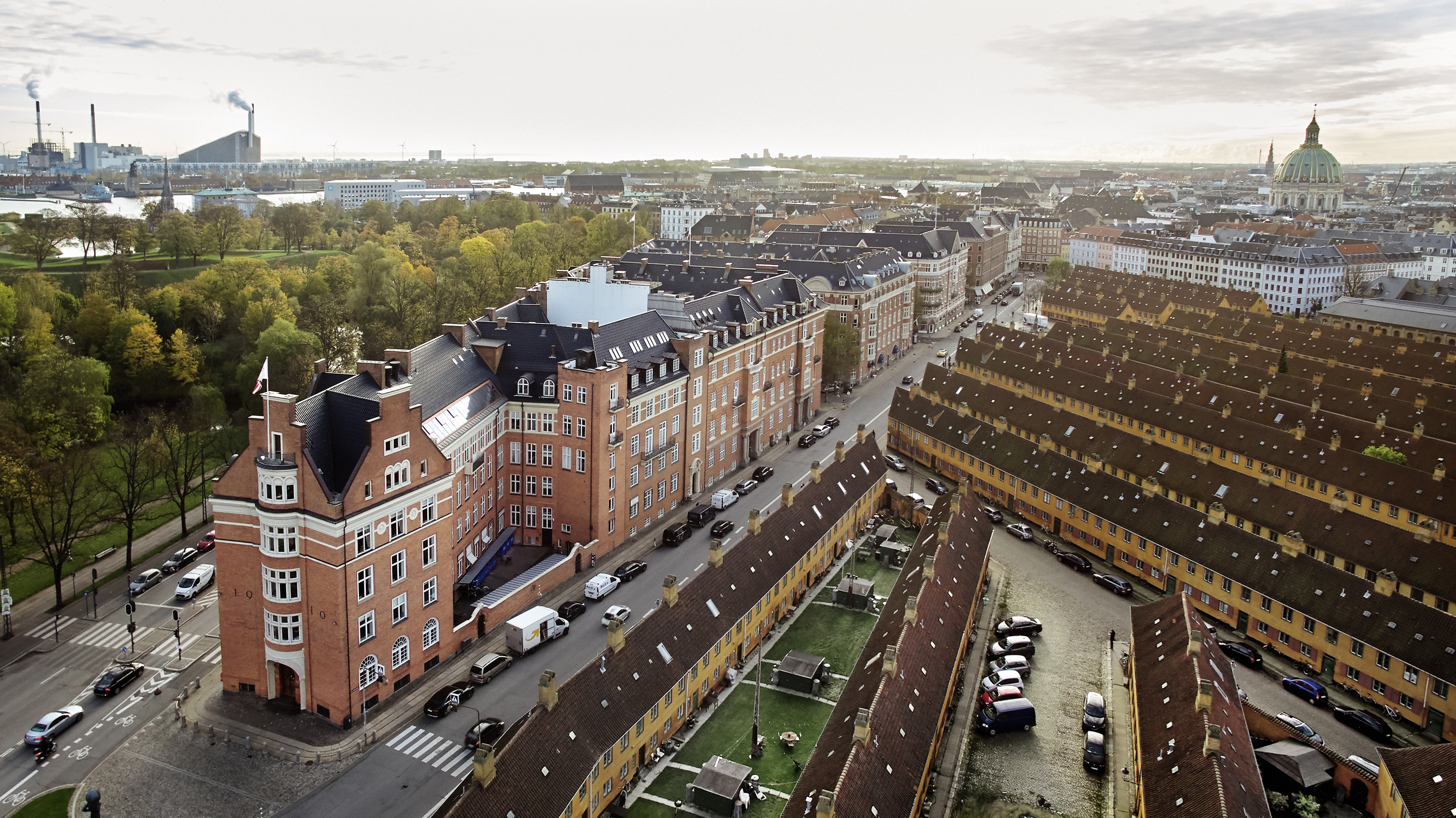
- Netcompany headquarters in Copenhagen, Denmark
- Type: Public company
- Traded as: Nasdaq Copenhagen: NETC
- Industry: IT
- Founded: 1999; 27 years ago
- Founder: André Rogaczewski, Claus Jørgensen, Carsten Gomard
- Headquarters: Copenhagen, Denmark
- Key people: André Rogaczewski (CEO) Claus Jørgensen (COO) Thomas Johansen (CFO)
- Products: IT consultancy, development, implementation, change management, maintenance and operations.
- Number of employees: 7999+
- Website: https://www.netcompany.com/int

Netcompany is a Danish publicly traded IT consultancy headquartered in Copenhagen, Denmark. Founded in 1999, the company has offices across 12 different countries. As of June 2024, Netcompany employs more than 7800 staff in its offices in Denmark, United Kingdom, Norway, The Netherlands, Poland, Vietnam, Sweden, Belgium, Luxembourg, Germany and Greece.

The company provides end-to-end IT services from development through to maintenance and operations to public and private organisations throughout Europe.

== History ==
The company was founded by André Rogaczewski (CEO), Claus Jørgensen (COO) and Carsten Gomard in 1999.

In 2005 the company expanded to Poland, opening an office in Warsaw.

Netcompany was privately owned up until 2006 when Danish private equity fund Axcel acquired the majority of the company's shares. In the beginning of 2011, the founders re-acquired the shares from Axcel.

In December 2015, Norwegian private equity fund FSN Capital acquired just over half of the company. According to Dagbladet Børsen, the sale price was DKK 1.1 billion.

The new ownership and resulting cash injection started the company's Northern European expansion with the acquisition of Norwegian IT consultancy Mesan AS, located in central Oslo, which at the time employed approximately 150 staff.

In January 2017 the company passed 1,000 employees becoming the first Danish startup in 20 years to do so.

In October 2017, Netcompany carried out its second acquisition, this time of UK-based Hunter Macdonald. The company employed around 250 staff (100 located in the company's Vietnam offices) and had at the time just been named United Kingdom's fastest growing IT services company

On 7 June 2018, Nasdaq Copenhagen accepted Netcompany Group A/S as a publicly traded company on the Main Market.

The following spring of 2019, Netcompany acquired the Dutch IT consultancy Qdelft, based in Delft with a staff of approximately 100 employees.

Netcompany Group acquired Luxembourg-based INTRASOFT International SA in November 2021 from Intracom Holdings. The company employed at the time more than 2,800 professionals, operating through its operational branches, subsidiaries, and offices in 13 countries.

In February 2025, Netcompany announced the acquisition of SDC A/S, a Danish banking IT service provider founded in 1963. The transaction was completed in July 2025, with SDC merging into the newly formed subsidiary Netcompany Banking Services A/S. The acquisition added 980 employees and expanded Netcompany's operations in the financial services sector.

In April 2026, Netcompany signed a £87m deal with INEOS which will see them become co-title partner of the Grenadiers cycling team.

== Services ==
Netcompany's portfolio of services ranges from IT consultancy, development and implementation to change management, maintenance and operations.

The majority of the company's business is based on projects within digital platforms, core systems and infrastructure services. Additionally, the company is increasingly engaged in emerging fields like blockchain, business intelligence and machine learning, delivering services to customers such as Copenhagen Airports and the Danish National Agency for IT and Learning.

While the company's customer portfolio is roughly a 50/50 mix of private and public organizations, it is particularly within the public sector that the company has gained recognition, especially in the home market of Denmark. In recent years as of 2023, the company has been chosen as vendor for a string of projects, such as a new debt-collection system for the Danish Tax Authority(SKAT), a new digital corporate tax filling IT-system also for SKAT and a communication platform, "Aula", for teachers, parents and pupils in Denmark's schools, servicing more than 2 million users.

== Digital Dogme ==
In April 2018, Netcompany launched the upskilling initiative Digital Dogme together with Danske Bank, TDC and Copenhagen Airports. The purpose of the initiative is to help remedy the increasing lack of qualified IT labour force in Denmark, by cultivating the digital skills of companies' existing employees that do not possess a formal background within IT. Today more than 30 companies are part of the movement.

== Subsidiaries ==
- Netcompany Banking Services A/S
- Netcompany A/S (DK)
- Netcompany Norway AS
- Netcompany SA (Southeast Europe & EU Institutions)
- Netcompany Netherlands B.V.
- Netcompany Sweden AB
- Netcompany UK Ltd
- Netcompany Vietnam Company Ltd.
- Netcompany Vietnam Company Ltd.
