= Kunde & Co =

- Industry: Marketing
- Founded: 1988
- Founder: Jesper Kunde
- Headquarters: Copenhagen, Denmark
- Number of locations: Denmark, Switzerland, Germany
- Number of employees: 200

Kunde & Co is one of Northern Europe's largest marketing and branding agencies with 200 employees of more than 18 different nationalities as of 2020. In 2020, the agency had a turnover of EUR 30 million. Kunde & Co was founded by Jesper Kunde in 1988. Headquartered in Copenhagen, it also has offices in Switzerland and Germany.

The agency specialises in creating overall marketing strategies, branding and communicating companies to strengthen their market position.
