= Arbejdsmarkedets Tillægspension =

Arbejdsmarkedets Tillægspension (ATP) is a supplementary (income-related) pension in Denmark, and is Denmark's largest lifelong pension plan. Residents of Denmark become eligible for ATP payments as soon as they turn 65 years old. Arbejdsmarkedets Tillægspension was amended into law on March 7, 1964.

== See also ==
- Pension
- Economy of Denmark
