= Morten Albæk =

Danish businessman (born 1975)

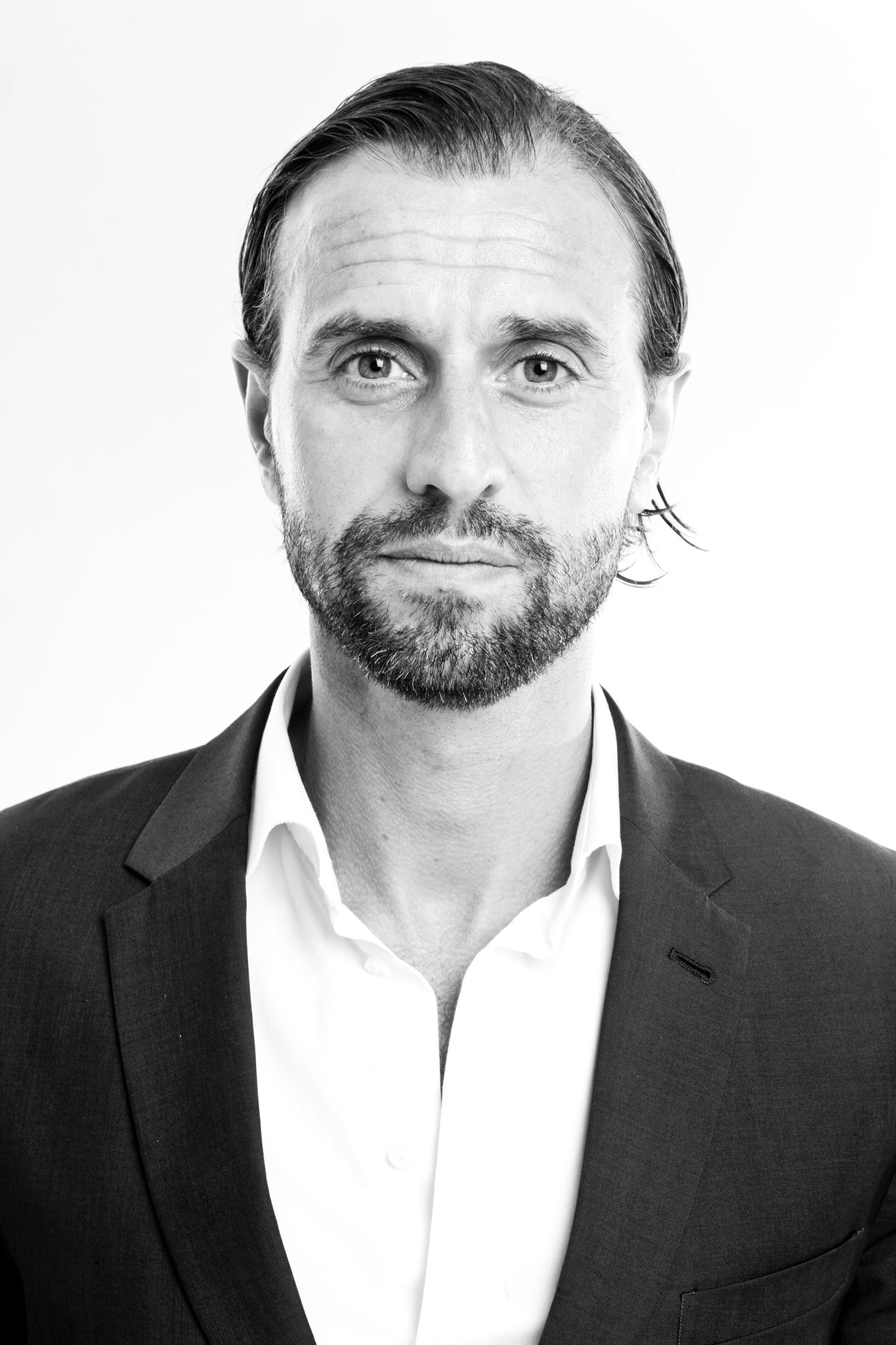
- Born: 28 July 1975 (age 50); Uggerby, Denmark
- Occupations: Founder and CEO at Voluntas A/S, Author

Morten Nødgaard Albæk (born 28 July 1975) is a Danish philosopher, bestselling author, and business person. He is the founder and CEO of the Danish advisory firm Voluntās A/S specialized in advising companies, foundations, boards, leaders, and governments on how to create, adapt and drive a meaningful organization, brand, society, and planet. Voluntās’ Meaningfulness Quotient (MQ) is the world's first scalable method to digitally measure the sense of meaningfulness among a company's employees – a groundbreaking decision-tool within strategy- and leadership development. The company is headquartered in Copenhagen and has an office in Tunis, Tunisia. Voluntas was the consultancy in Denmark with the 2nd highest revenue and employee growth from 2017 to 2019 (53% in that period).

== Academia ==
Albæk holds a master's degree in History and Philosophy from Aarhus University. He has been an Honorary Professor in Philosophy and Education at Aalborg University.

== Career ==
Albæk started his career in Danske Bank, Denmark's largest financial institution, undertaking various marketing and business development functions before being appointed as SVP for the department for Idea Generation & Innovation. At Danske Bank, he pioneered the Financial Literacy Program, later to be included as a case in the UN Global Compact’s yearbook of 2011.

In 2009, Albæk joined Vestas, the largest wind turbine company in the world, as Group SVP for Global Marketing, Communication & Corporate Relations and a member of the Executive Committee. At Vestas, he envisioned and developed WindMade, the world’s first global consumer label identifying products produced with wind energy – the first consumer label to be endorsed by the United Nations. Additionally, Morten Albæk launched Wind for Prosperity, a business model bringing affordable and reliable electricity to impoverished and remote rural, but wind rich populations.

In 2015, Albæk founded advisory firm Voluntās (Latin for “will, purpose, goal, meaning”) specialized in advising companies, leaders, and governments on how to create, adapt and drive a meaningful organization, brand, society, and planet. Voluntās is the world's first company to systematically measure and consult on meaningfulness. Voluntās works to fundamentally change how human potential is led and realized.

Albæk serves as chairman of the university Design School Kolding, he is part of the advisory board for Holly & Sam Branson's fond Big Change and a member of the board of several companies.

== Books ==
Albæk has authored four books: One Life. How we forgot to live meaningful lives (DK: 2018 UK: 2019, Ukrainian: 2020). Albæk won the Mofibo Award for the Danish audio-version in the category Documentary & Biography., The Average Human Being(2013), Encounters Between What You Say and What You Do (2008), and Generation Fucked Up? (2005),.

== Merits ==
Albæk has – as the only Scandinavian – been selected 5 times for The Internationalist's list of the “100 Most Influential CMOs in the World” (in 2011–2015). In 2020, The Internationalist listed Albæk among "20 Inspiring Marketers of the First 20 Years of the 21st Century." Albæk was selected for Fast Company's list of the “1,000 most creative people in business” in 2014.

Albæk left his wife and 3 children− in 2023.
