= Thomas Lund-Sørensen =

Danish diplomat (born 1964)

Thomas Lund-Sørensen (born 1 October 1964) is a Danish diplomat who worked for the Foreign Service and the Defense Intelligence Service. He was Ambassador, Director-General for Asia, Latin America and the Caribbean, and Oceania in the Foreign Service and is now ambassador to Ukraine.

Lund-Sørensen was ambassador to Jordan and the Danish government's special envoy to Libya in Benghazi during the uprising against Gaddafi. From 2012 to November 2021, Lund-Sørensen was the founding CEO and Director of the Center for Cyber Security in the Defense Intelligence Service. He was a partner and the head of cyber risk at the British advisory firm Macro Advisory Partners from 2021 until 2023.
