= Global Dignity =

Global Dignity is an independent NGO whose guiding idea is to promote the universal right of every human being to a decent life.

The initiative interacts, among other things, with the Young Global Leaders movement (from which the three founders originate) and local communities to provide "dignity lessons" to as many children and young people as possible in the world. The lessons of dignity are primarily aimed at making the recipients aware of the essence of dignity and the problems that arise as a result of its disrespect, awakening their sensitivity, the ability to feel compassion with another person, as well as to ignite in them the desire to act positively on a daily basis.

== History ==
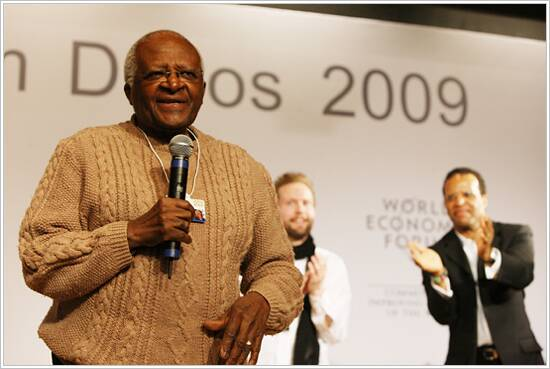
Desmond Tutu, Pekka Himanen and John Hope Bryant talk to students on the International Human Dignity Forum in a Swiss school.

It was formed in 2006 by three "responsible citizens of the world": Prince Haakon (Norway), Pekka Himanen (Finland) and John Hope Bryant (USA), who met at the World Economic Forum.

In 2016 the Norwegian branch was closed due to funding concerns.

In 2026 it was active across 70 countries worldwide.

== Principles of dignity ==
Global Dignity recognizes dignity via five basic principles:

1. Every human being has the right to a decent life.
2. A decent life means the opportunity to achieve its full potential, which is conditioned by access to the right level of medical care, education, fair remuneration and a sense of security.
3. Dignity means the right to freedom in making certain life decisions and respecting others in exercising this right.
4. Dignity should be the fundamental value of all action.
5. The dignity of the individual is inextricably linked to the dignity of others.

== Global Dignity Day ==
Global Dignity Day takes place on the third Wednesday of October.

International Day of Human Dignity was first celebrated on 20 October 2008. (One source suggests 2009.) The theme was human dignity and its significance for young people and in relation to other people. Schoolchildren in 20 countries around the world took part in the First Day of International Human Dignity. In Poland it was first celebrated in 2009. The Polish partners of the initiative have included the Nowa Era Publishing House (educational patronage) and Global Shapers Community Warsaw. International Day of Human Dignity was celebrated in Finland for the first time on 19 October 2011. The theme was human dignity and the revolutionary power of individual thinking. Archbishop Desmond Tutu, President Martti Ahtisaari, Crown Prince Haakon of Norway, founder of Operation HOPE John Hope Bryant and philosopher Pekka Himanen spoke at this first Finnish event.

In 2011, the Day of Human Dignity was celebrated in more than 50 countries around the world.

Dignity Day partners worldwide include Operation Hope, Roland Berger Strategy Consultants and BBDO.
