= Jimmy Maymann =

Danish businessman

Jimmy Maymann-Holler
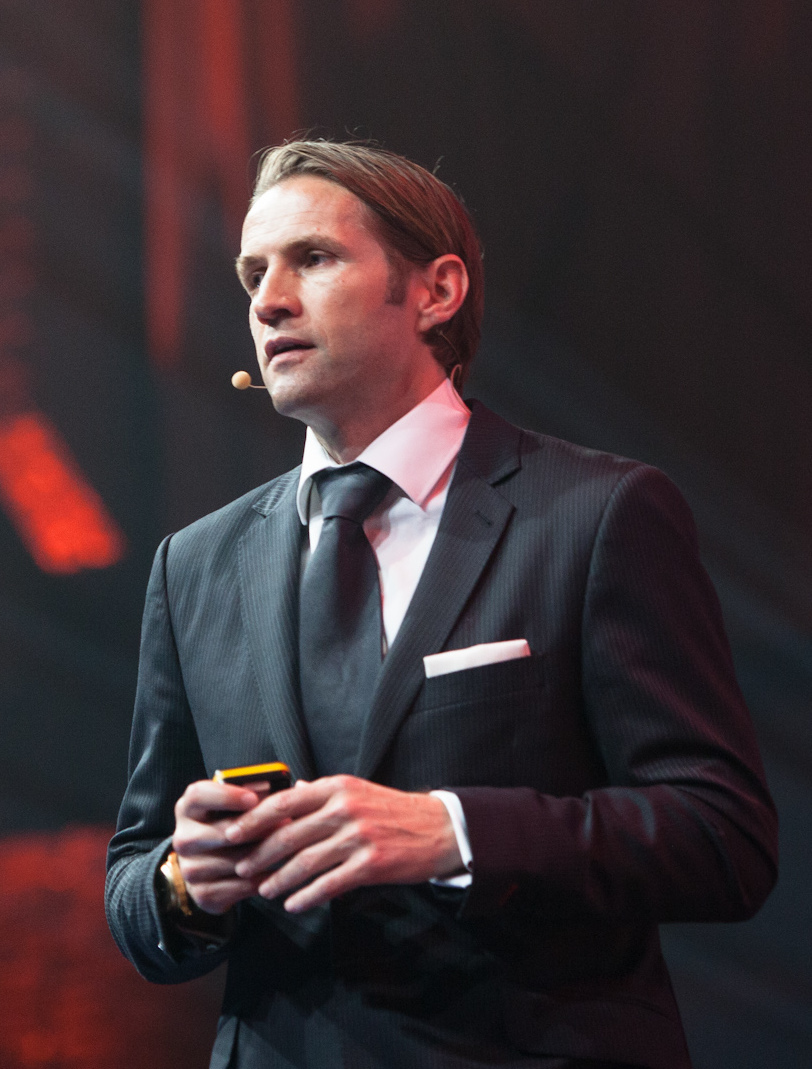
- Born: 1971 (age 54–55); Copenhagen, Denmark
- Education: University of Odense, London Business School
- Occupations: Executive Vice President, President of Content and Consumer Brands, AOL
- Known for: Entrepreneurship, Digital media, Strategy, Online advertising

Jimmy Maymann-Holler (born , 1971) is a Danish entrepreneur specializing in digital advertising, digital technology and new media strategy.

From September 2015 to January 2017, Maymann served as the executive vice president and president, AOL Content & Consumer Brands, where he led AOL's content portfolio, strategy and OTT operations.

From December 2012 to September 2015, Maymann served as the chief executive officer of HuffPost, based in New York City, during which time he focused on the transition of HuffPost towards becoming a profitable, global media company.

== Early career ==
Maymann started his internet career in Denmark in the mid-1990s after he graduated from the University of Odense with a degree in Economics and International Marketing. His final university thesis – about the commercial opportunities presented by the internet – was inspired by a field trip Maymann took to the US in 1994, during which he was exposed to the internet for the first time, and which ultimately laid the foundation for his first business ventures.

In 1995, Maymann founded Neo Ideo along with two old friends, Morten Lund (a future investor in Skype) and Lars Holm Hansen. Neo Ideo was an internet consultancy advising Scandinavian companies on internet strategy and Maymann served as Managing Partner until 1999, when the company was acquired by global advertising agency Leo Burnett. As part of that acquisition Maymann joined Leo Burnett first as its Strategic Director responsible for managing the firm's major Scandinavian clients, but ultimately becoming Global Discipline Head of Leo Burnett's Marketing Service practice Arc Worldwide.

Maymann remained at Leo Burnett for five years during which time he also completed an executive MBA at London Business School.

== GoViral and AOL ==
In 2005, Maymann co-founded GoViral, an online video distribution company that developed video advertising platforms able to track, distribute and host video ads across multiple online sites. With Maymann's guidance the company evolved from being primarily involved in video production to focusing on platform development, allowing it to quickly scale its operations.

In February 2011 GoViral was acquired by AOL for $96.7m. Maymann was reportedly initially opposed to the sale, preferring instead to continue building the business. However, despite being the single biggest shareholder, he ultimately acceded to the desires of the other shareholders and agreed to the sale.

After the integration of GoViral into AOL, Maymann was promoted by CEO Tim Armstrong to be the senior vice president of International of the newly formed AOL Huffington Post Media Group, which had been formed after AOL’s purchase of HuffPost for $315m, only weeks after the acquisition of GoViral. In this role Maymann was primarily responsible for creating and managing the international strategy of HuffPost as well as AOL's various content brands.

== HuffPost ==
In December 2012, after almost two years in his international role at AOL, Maymann was announced as the chief executive officer of HuffPost, in what was seen as the latest step in that brand's transition to a standalone company within AOL.

Since coming to the helm, and working alongside editor-in-chief Arianna Huffington, Maymann oversaw the growth of HuffPost's traffic from 45 million to 200 million monthly unique visitors and grew its staff to around 1,000 people worldwide. In 2014, HuffPost broke even with $146 Million in revenue.

Key focuses of Maymann's tenure as CEO of HuffPost were its international expansion, the creation of an innovative online streaming video site called HuffPost Live and the re-organization of the domestic business in order to drive better monetization across the site.

=== International expansion ===
Under Maymann's guidance, HuffPost's international expansion was rapid: after only two years, international visitors accounted for over 50% of its total traffic. HuffPost primarily established partnerships with existing major news organizations in each country, a strategy that enabled rapid growth to be carried out while keeping investment costs down. HuffPost has 15 international editions in Canada, the UK, Le Huffington Post in France (in partnership with Le Monde), El Huffington Post in Spain (in partnership with Le Pais), L’Huffington Post in Italy (in partnership with Gruppo Editoriale L’Espresso), Huffington Post Deutschland (in partnership with Tomorrow Focus AG), Huffington Post Japan (in partnership with Asahi Shimbun), Al Huffington Post Maghreb covering Algeria, Tunisia and Morocco (in partnership with private investors), Brasil Post in Brazil (in partnership with Abril Group) [link20], and Huffington Post South Korea (in partnership with Hankyoreh News). A number of additional international editions are being planned, notably including India and China. In July 2015, HuffPost Arabi launched, followed by Huffington Post Australia in August 2015. Each new market is entered with a financial goal of profitability within two years. In furtherance of its goal to be a global media organization, international editions now meet at global summits to help improve collaboration.

=== Video innovation ===
In August 2012, HuffPost launched HuffPost Live – an innovative interactive TV format, which it streams for eight hours each weekday from a studio in its New York Office. HuffPost Live consisted primarily of interview-based content and often incorporated viewers who are encouraged to contribute directly and in real time. The site attracted roughly 100 million monthly views and approximately 20,000 people contributed to HuffPost Live segments via VOIP networks such as Google Hangout and Skype. The site recently announced that it had reached the milestone of one billion total views, that Huffington Post Partner Studios experienced 124% YoY growth in 2014, and that HuffPost Live content was being used to supplement editorial content on the huffingtonpost.com site.

In early 2016, HuffPost Live announced proposed changes to its video production structure. These changes include scaling back its 8 hours of live publishing daily to focus on producing video for HuffingtonPost.com and various social media platforms. HuffPost will continue to produce live content around cultural and political events.

=== Native advertising ===
The development of HuffPost Partner Studio, the in-house content creation agency of HuffPost, was another of Maymann's enhancements of HuffPost's monetization capabilities. HuffPost Partner Studio is a team of editors and strategists that works collaboratively with brands to optimize, and in many instances create, native and branded advertising content to be distributed through HuffPost. This has also been described as a ‘brands as newsrooms’ approach. Whilst the HuffPost Partner Studio team is made up of staff with editorial backgrounds, all sponsored content appearing on the site includes clear identification of the content's sponsor. In addition to the content creation itself, many of the benefits of using the agency come from its familiarity with the Huffington Post's site and the traffic patterns of its audience, as well as access to the Huffington Post's real-time audience and traffic tracking technology. As a senior marketing manager has been quoted as explaining:

[They have] the knowledge of what’s newsworthy, when should it be placed, how should it be discussed or talked about so it’s more compelling to a wider audience. They bring that guidance and expertise to us to make sure how, where and when we’re telling a story is lined up all in the right way."

Pricing for HuffPost Partner Studio programs ranges from $40,000 to $1 million, depending on the level of assistance and the desired distribution of the campaign. HuffPost expects about one-third of its advertising revenue to come from native and content marketing.

== Content and consumer brands at AOL ==
In September 2015, Maymann was named executive vice president and president of content and consumer brands at AOL. In this position, he led AOL's portfolio of content brands, as well as AOL's content strategy and OTT operations, which altogether reached a global audience of around 400 million unique visitors every month. In January 2016, Maymann shared his plans for the year ahead to increase AOL's video content production across its brands.

== Continuing entrepreneurial activity ==
Maymann maintains an active portfolio of angel investments focusing largely on media, tech and gaming companies.

== Personal life ==
Maymann-Holler's wife is a doctor, also from Denmark. They have three children: one girl and two boys. Jimmy Maymann-Holler took his wife's name after their marriage.

While living in Denmark, Maymann spent a brief period playing handball at the highest level. He remains an avid runner and triathlete and has completed more than 20 marathons.
