= Terrafugia Transition =

American roadable aircraft

Transition
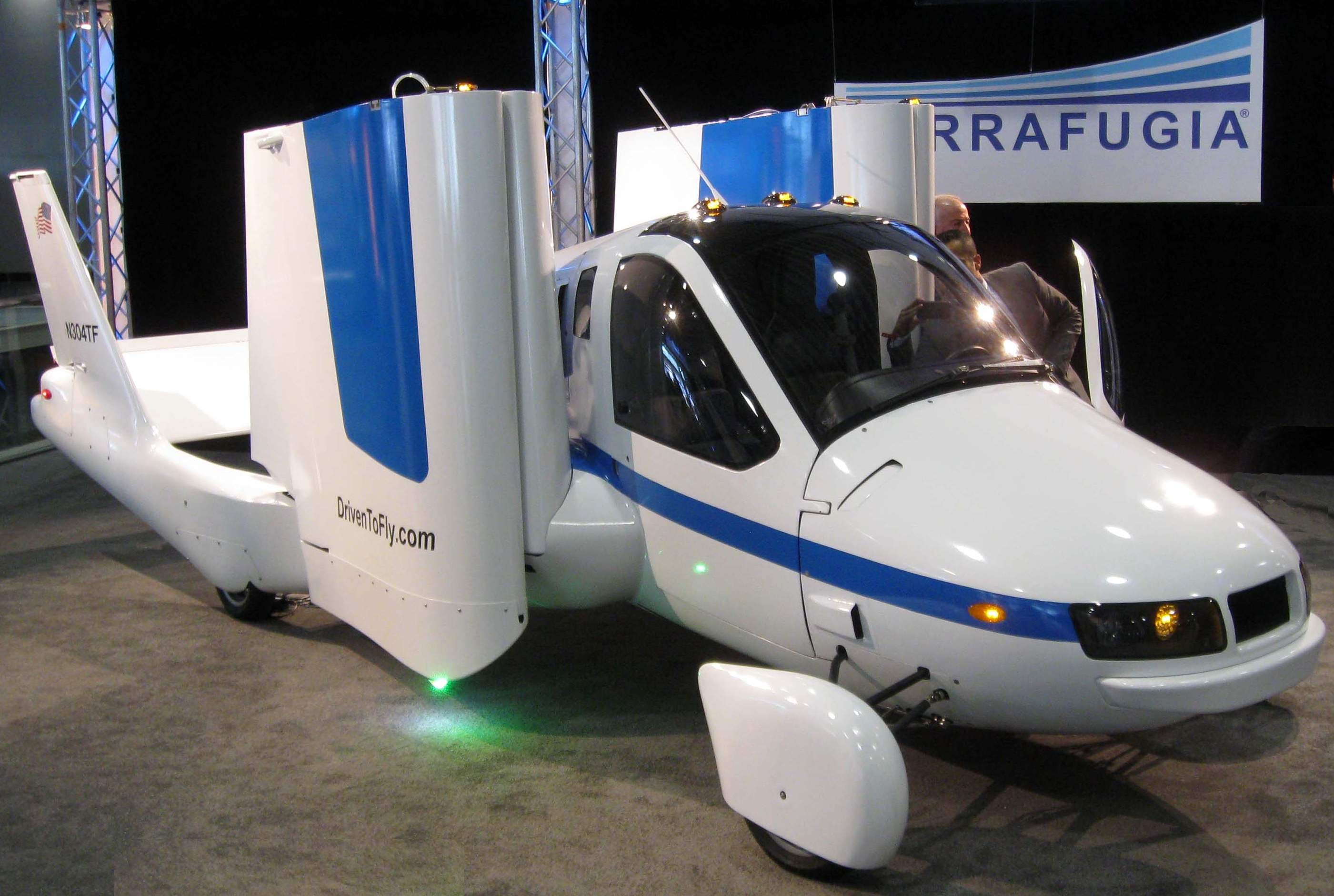
- Production Prototype of Terrafugia Transition at the N.Y. Int'l Auto Show in April 2012

General information
- Type: Flying car
- Manufacturer: Terrafugia
- Status: prototype (2009)
- Number built: 2

History
- First flight: March 5, 2009
- Developed from: 2006

The Terrafugia Transition is a light sport, roadable airplane under development by Terrafugia since 2006.

The Rotax 912ULS piston engine powered, carbon-fiber vehicle is planned to have a flight range of 425 nmi (489 mi; 787 km) using either automotive premium grade unleaded gasoline or 100LL avgas and a cruising flight speed of 93 kn (107 mph; 172 km/h). Equipment includes a Dynon Skyview glass panel avionics system, an airframe parachute, and an optional autopilot.

On the road, it can drive up to 70 miles per hour (110 km/h) with normal traffic. The Transition Production Prototype's folded dimensions of 6 ft 8 in (2.03 m) high, 7 ft 6 in (2.29 m) wide and 18 ft 9 in (5.72 m) long are designed to fit within a standard household garage. When operated as a car, the engine power take-off near the propeller engages a variable-diameter pulley CVT automatic transmission to send power to the trailing-suspension mounted rear wheels via half-shafts powering belt drives. In flight, the engine drives a pusher propeller. The Transition has folding wings and a twin tail.

== Design and development ==
The experimental Transition Proof of Concept's first flight in March 2009 was successful and took place at Plattsburgh International Airport in upstate New York using U.S. Federal Aviation Administration (FAA) tail number N302TF. First customer delivery, as of March 2009, was originally planned to take approximately 18 months and occur in 2011.

On July 1, 2010, it was announced that the Terrafugia Transition had been granted an exemption from the FAA concerning its Maximum Takeoff Weight (MTOW), allowing the Transition to be certified with a take-off weight up to 1,430 pounds (650 kg); the limit matches the MTOW for amphibious light-sport aircraft. The extra 110 pounds (50 kg) granted by the exemption provides more weight allowance for the mandatory road safety features such as airbags and bumpers.

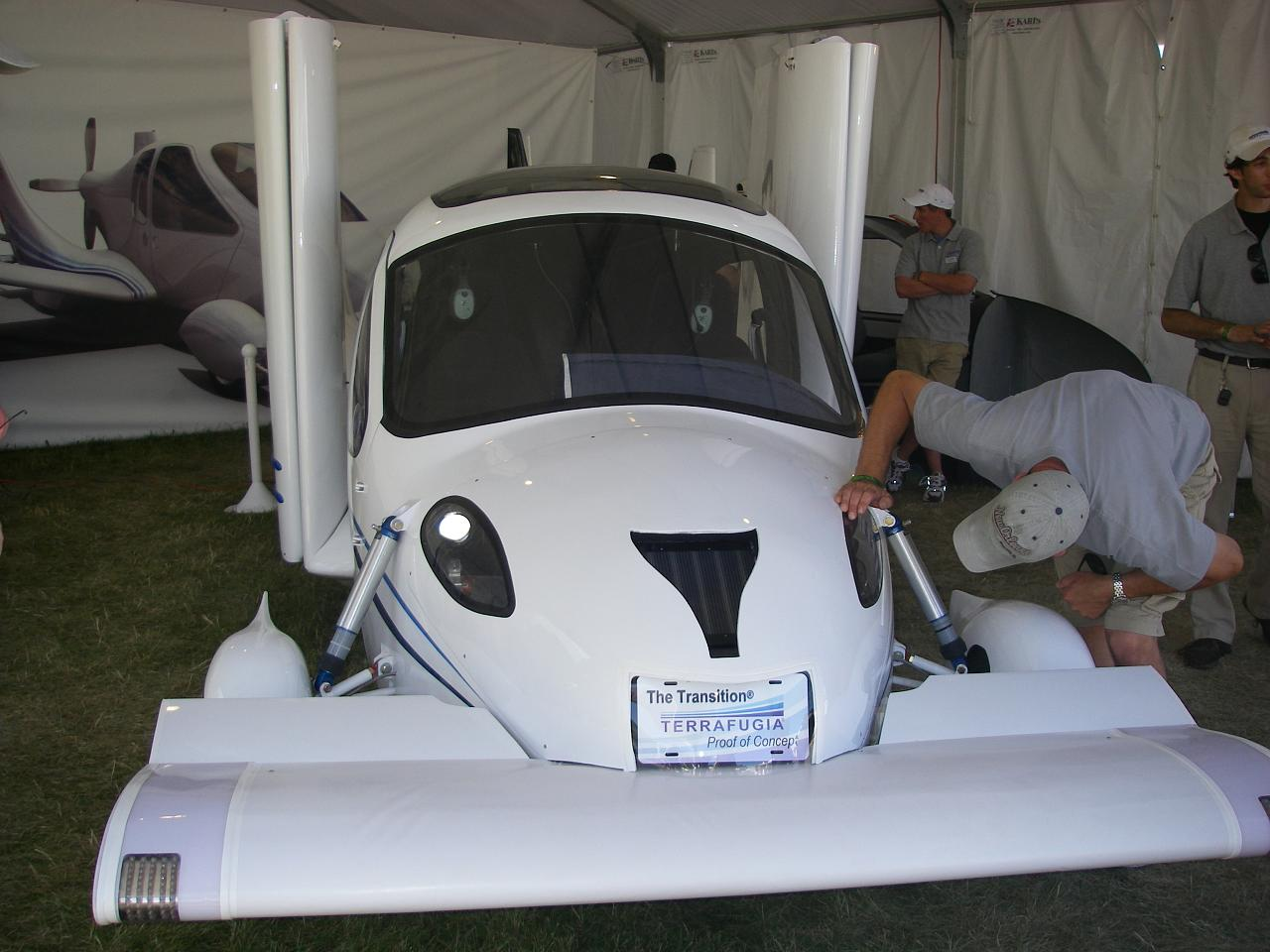
Oshkosh July 2008, Proof of Concept

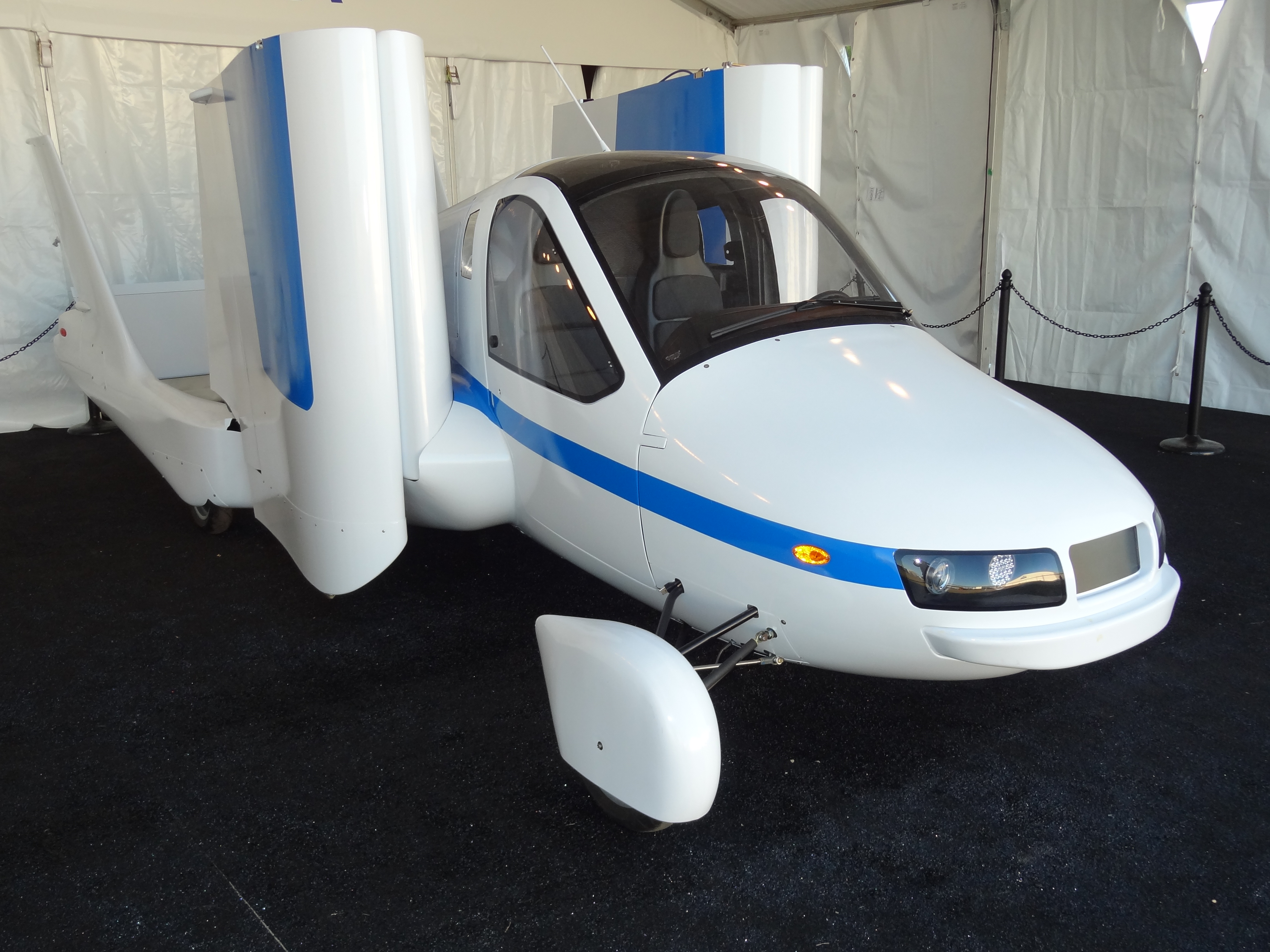
Oshkosh July 2011, Production Prototype

The proposed design of the production version was made by Danish designer Jens Martin Skibsted and his partners at KiBiSi and made public at AirVenture Oshkosh on July 26, 2010. Aerodynamic changes revealed included a new, optimized airfoil, Hoerner wingtips, and removal of the canard after it was found to have an adverse aerodynamic interaction with the front wheel suspension struts; furthermore, the multipurpose passenger vehicle classification from the NHTSA removed the requirement for a full-width bumper that had inspired the original canard design.

On November 16, 2010, the U.S. National Highway Traffic Safety Administration (NHTSA) published Terrafugia's petition for a temporary, three-year hardship exemption from four FMVSS standards in the Transition. Terrafugia requested to use lighter weight motorcycle tires instead of RV tires, polycarbonate for the windshield and side windows, basic airbags instead of advanced, dual stage airbags and to not include an electronic stability control system. The NHTSA granted all of the requested exemptions on June 29, 2011, but limited the stability control and airbag exemptions to one year.

In June 2011, a delay was announced and Terrafugia's CEO estimated that about another 18 months would be required before first customer delivery in "late 2012", but this was not achieved. December 2011 saw the base price increase to US$279,000 from an initial price of US$194,000.

After undergoing drive tests and high-speed taxi tests, the production prototype completed its first flight on March 23, 2012, at the same airport in Plattsburgh, New York, that was used for the Proof of Concept's flight testing. The production prototype then made its auto show debut at the 2012 New York International Auto Show in April 2012.

In June 2012, Terrafugia announced that the Transition had completed the first of six phases of flight testing. By July, the second phase of testing was underway, expanding the performance envelope in the sky and continuing drive testing on the ground.

In January 2013, development continued and the company announced that it might be necessary to construct a third, completely new prototype, due to the large number of modifications required. The modifications to date are said to appear to have improved the previous handling characteristics.

By March 2014, the design of the third, updated prototype had progressed to finalization of the major structural members and a statement to investors said that it would be used in final compliance testing for certification before the first customer delivery which was then estimated to take at least another 18 months and occur "in 2015".

By April 2014, 12 two-person test flights had taken place; this was the first time that anyone other than Terrafugia's chief test pilot had flown the Transition. As of 22 August 2014, first customer delivery was hoped for in about 18 months "in the second quarter of 2016."

In December 2014 the company asked the FAA to allow the Transition to be operated at a gross weight of 1,800 lb (816 kg) instead of the light-sport aircraft maximum weight of 1,320 lb (599 kg) and have a stall speed of 54 kn (100 km/h; 62 mph) instead of the category maximum of 45 kn (83 km/h; 52 mph). The company indicated that the increases were required to allow inclusion of structures to meet FMVSS ground operation safety regulations. The company had previously been granted an increase in gross weight of 110 lb (50 kg) and another LSA aircraft, the ICON A5, was granted a 250 lb (113 kg) exemption to meet FAA spin resistance requirements; this new application would increase the Transition's allowed weight by a total of 480 lb (218 kg) or 36%. During consultations the request for the weight increase was supported by the General Aviation Manufacturers Association, the Experimental Aircraft Association, the Aircraft Owners and Pilots Association and the Light Aircraft Manufacturers Association. Only a few individuals expressed opposition to the request. The exemption was granted by the FAA on 19 June 2016.

In April 2015 the company announced that parts were being built for the third version of the aircraft, and that current planning estimated the first customer delivery after roughly two years. Terrafugia COO/VP of Engineering Kevin Colburn also stated that the company has changed the price estimate from $279K to between $300K and $400K.

In November 2015, the company announced that the third version of the Transition was being tested with a Rotax 912is engine, rather than the Rotax 912ULS that the second prototype had flown with.

As of April 2017, the company's website says: "Today, Terrafugia is finalizing production vehicle design and compliance testing in preparation for vehicle deliveries within the next three years."

As of November 2017, media reports suggested a 2019 delivery date for the first vehicles.

In April 2018, the production prototype ("D2") was retired. While the original proof of concept vehicle had flown only about 8 hours in total, the production prototype had logged 212 flight hours, completing 317 takeoffs and landings.

In July 2018 the company announced a series of upgrades that will be incorporated in the production aircraft with delivery planned for July 2019. These include a hybrid-electric motor and lithium iron phosphate battery for road mode use, a Dynon electronic flight instrument system, a Ballistic Recovery Systems ballistic parachute, an inflight power boost feature, a remodeled interior, increased cargo space, improved seat belt design, airbags, plus three rearview cameras.

In January 2021, Terrafugia announced that the Transition received a Special Light-Sport Aircraft (LSA) airworthiness certificate from the FAA for the Transition to be flown only, with road use approval to follow in 2022.

In February 2021, it was reported that Terrafugia had laid off most of their employees and would close down operations in the United States later in the year, with the intention of moving to China.

== Specifications ==
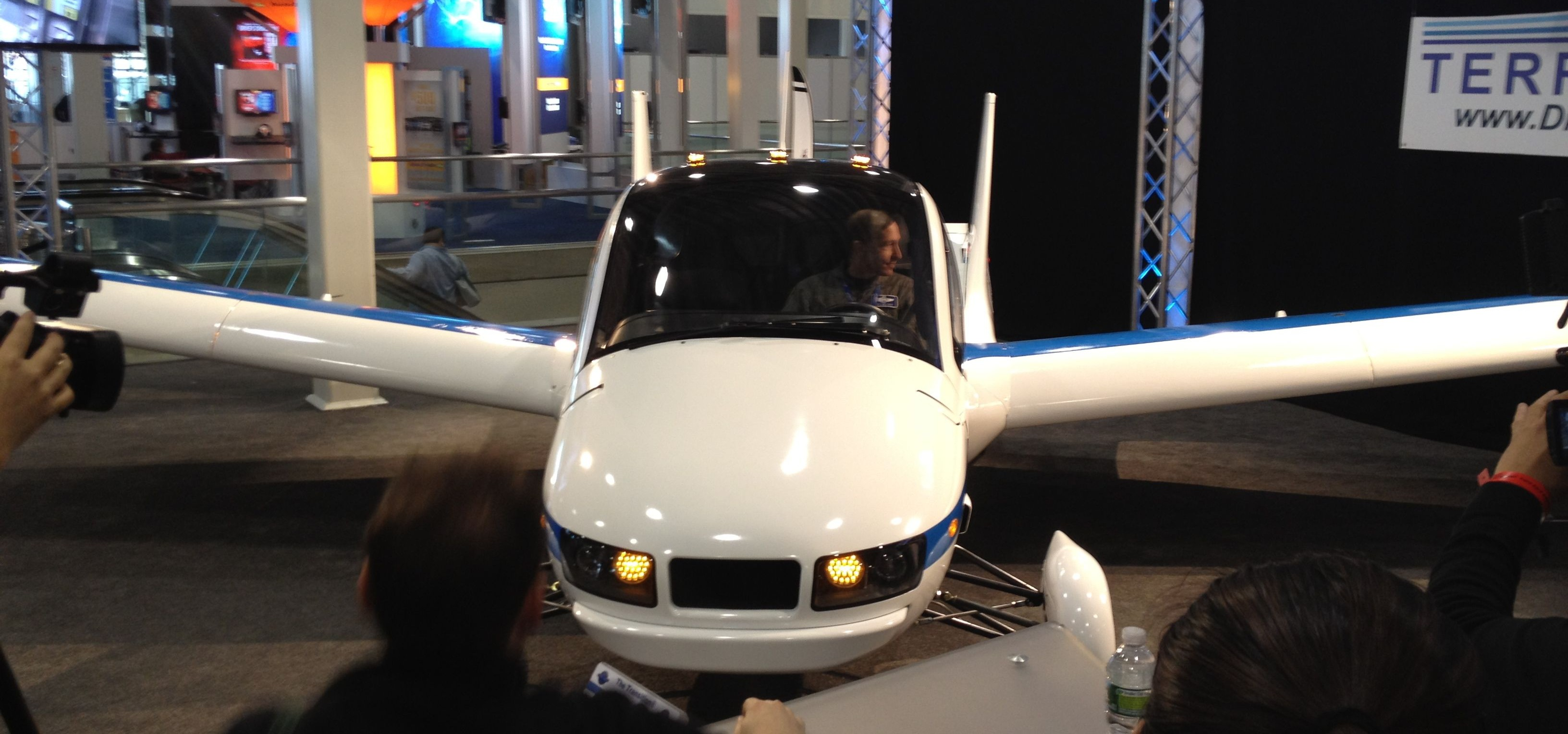
Production Prototype with wings extended at New York Int'l Auto Show in April 2012

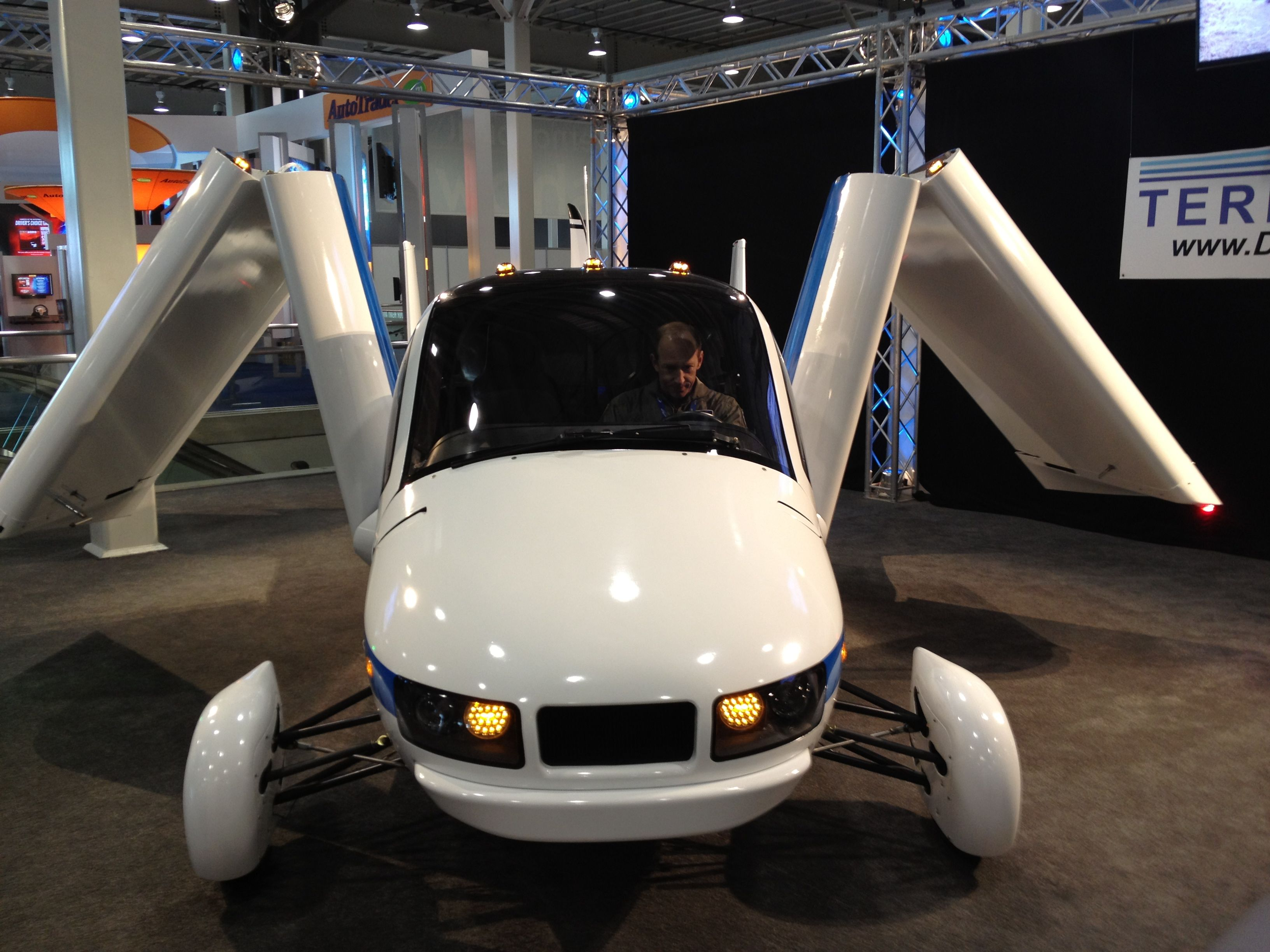
Prototype with wings partially folded

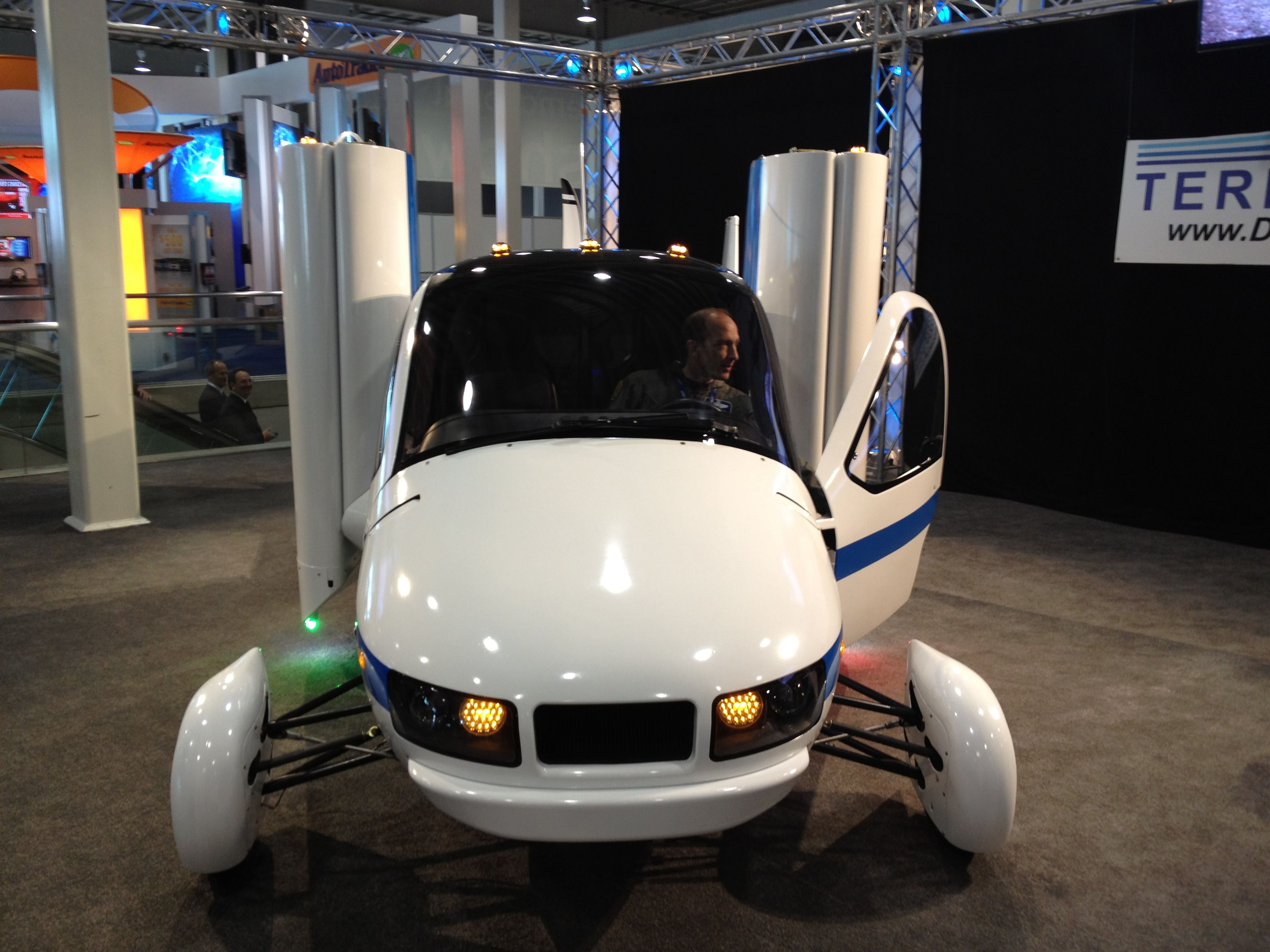
Prototype with wings folded

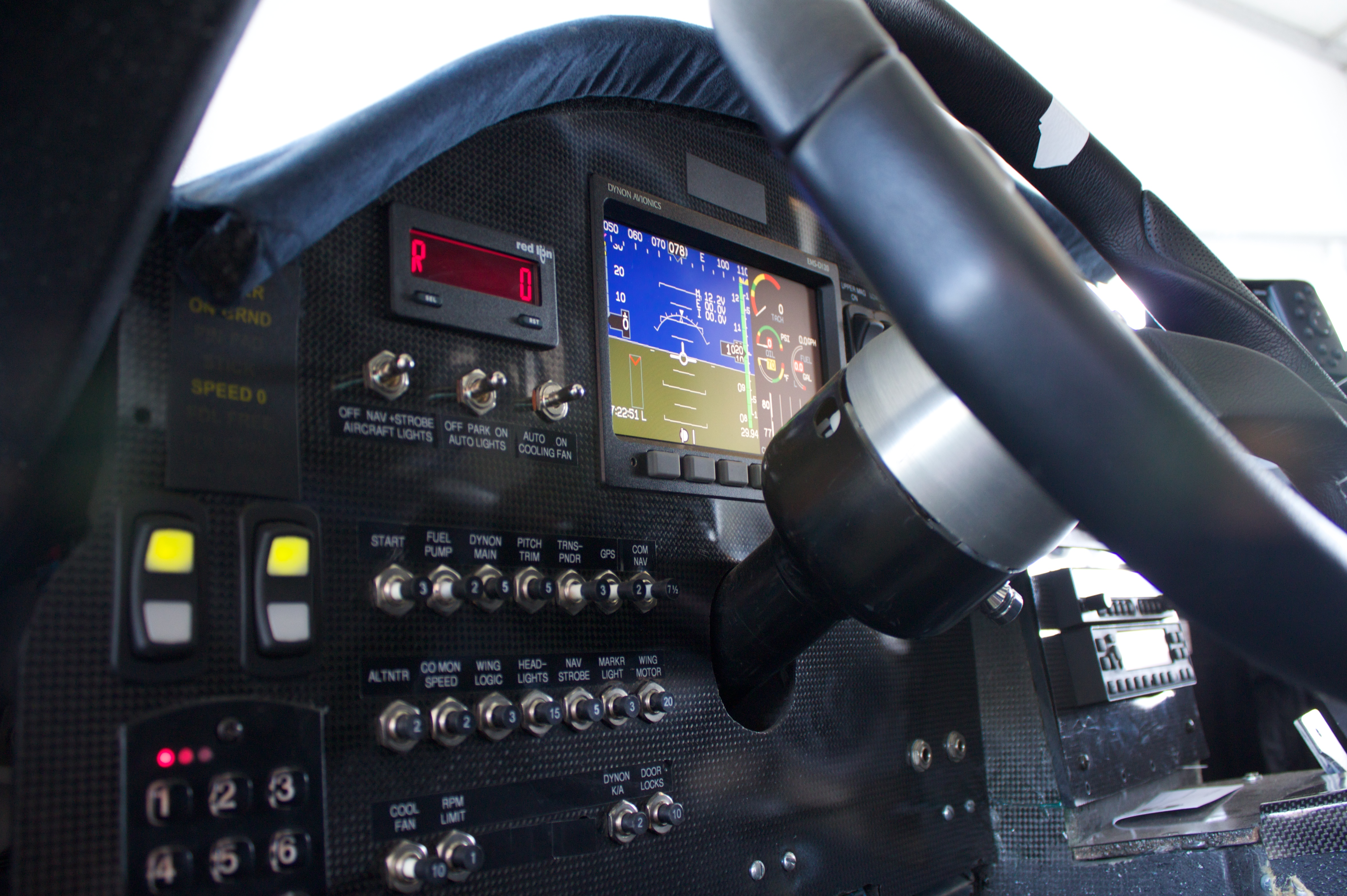
Internal cockpit view

Data from Terrafugia Transition Proof of Concept specifications. Terrafugia Transition 2010 specifications.

General characteristics

- Crew: 1 pilot
- Capacity: 1 passenger
- Length: 19 ft 9 in (6.02 m)
- Wingspan: 26 ft 6 in (8.08 m)
- Height: 6 ft 6 in (1.98 m)
- Empty weight: 970 lb (440 kg)
- Max takeoff weight: 1,430 lb (649 kg)
- Cockpit width: 48 in (1.2 m) at the shoulder
- Fuel capacity: 23 US gal (87 L; 19 imp gal), 141 pounds (64 kg)
- Length on road: 18 ft 9 in (5.72 m) with elevator up
- Width on road: 7 ft 6 in (2.29 m) with wings folded
- Height on road: 6 ft 8 in (2.03 m)
- Rear wheel drive on road
- Powerplant: 1 × Rotax 912ULS , 100 hp (75 kW) @ 5800 rpm (max. 5 minutes), 95 hp (71 kW) @ 5500 rpm (continuous)
- Propellers: 5 ft 8 in (1.73 m) diameter Proof of Concept - Prince Aircraft Company, four-bladed "P-Tip"
  Production Prototype - Sensenich 3 Blade Rotax Ground Adjustable Propeller

Performance

- Maximum speed: 100 kn (115 mph, 185 km/h)
- Cruise speed: 93 kn (107 mph, 172 km/h)
- Stall speed: 54 kn (62 mph, 100 km/h)
- Range: 425 nmi (489 mi, 787 km) - Flying; 805 mi (1,296 km; 700 nmi) - Driving
- Maximum speed on road: 70 mph (110 km/h)
- Fuel economy in cruise flight: 5 US gal (19 L) per hour, 21.4 mpg_{‑US} (11.0 L/100 km; 25.7 mpg_{‑imp})
- Fuel economy on road: 35 mpg_{‑US} (6.7 L/100 km; 42 mpg_{‑imp})
- Certifications: Both FAA and FMVSS certifications planned

Avionics
Glass panel; the Proof-of-Concept airplane includes:

- Dynon Avionics EFIS-D100 Electronic Flight Information System with HS34 Nav and GPS Connectivity
- Dynon Avionics EMS-D120 Engine Monitoring System
- Garmin GTX 327 Transponder
- Garmin SL30 nav/comm transceiver

The Production Prototype has a glass cockpit including:

- Dynon Avionics SkyView SV-D1000
- XCOM Avionics VHF Transceiver
- Transition custom touch screen dashboard computer
