= Terrafugia TF-X =

Autonomous flying car

TF-X
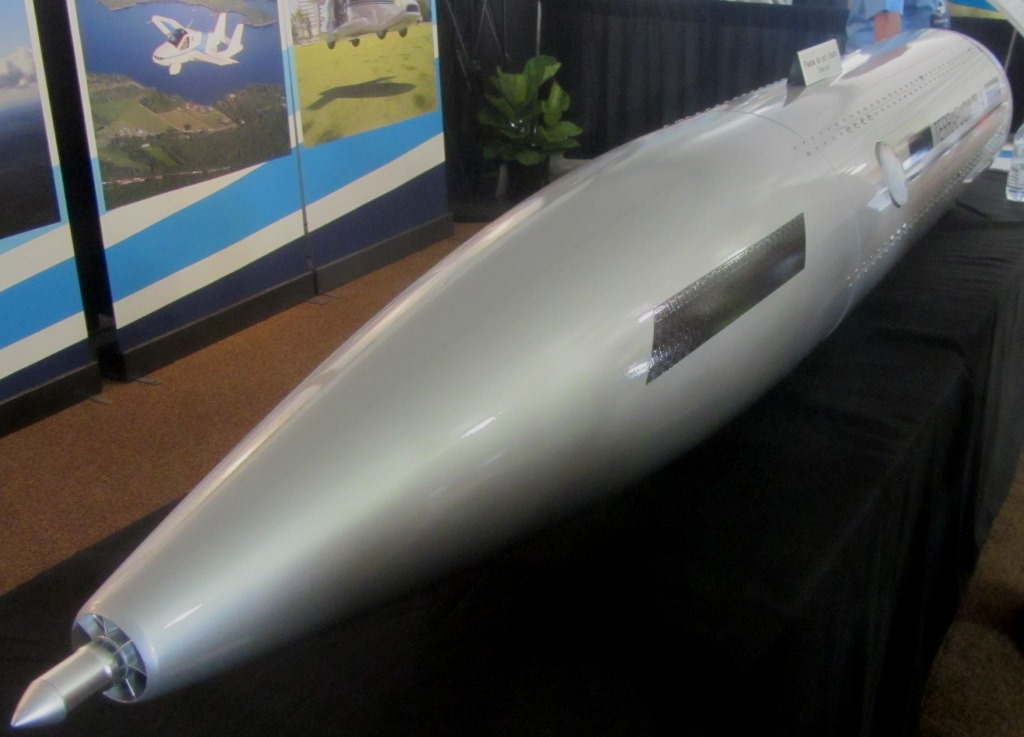
- Prototype TF-X Pod

General information
- Manufacturer: Terrafugia

The Terrafugia TF-X is an autonomous flying car under development by the US company Terrafugia. The TF-X seats four passengers and uses an engine combined with two electric motors for propulsion. Unlike the previously proposed Transition, the TF-X is capable of vertical take-off and landing by extending its retractable wings attached with pusher propellers, while aerial thrust is provided by a ducted fan at the rear. It will be able to fit in a single car garage.

Powered by two plug-in hybrid 600-horsepower electric motors and a 300-horsepower fuel engine, the TF-X is planned to have a flight range of 500 miles (805 km) with a cruising flight speed of 200 mph (322 km/h) without the need to refuel or recharge. Road speed is currently unknown. The vehicle is expected to cost upwards of £200,000 (roughly $300,000) if it becomes available for purchase.

== See also ==
- Terrafugia Transition
