= Rail gauge in Australia =

Railway gauges of Australia

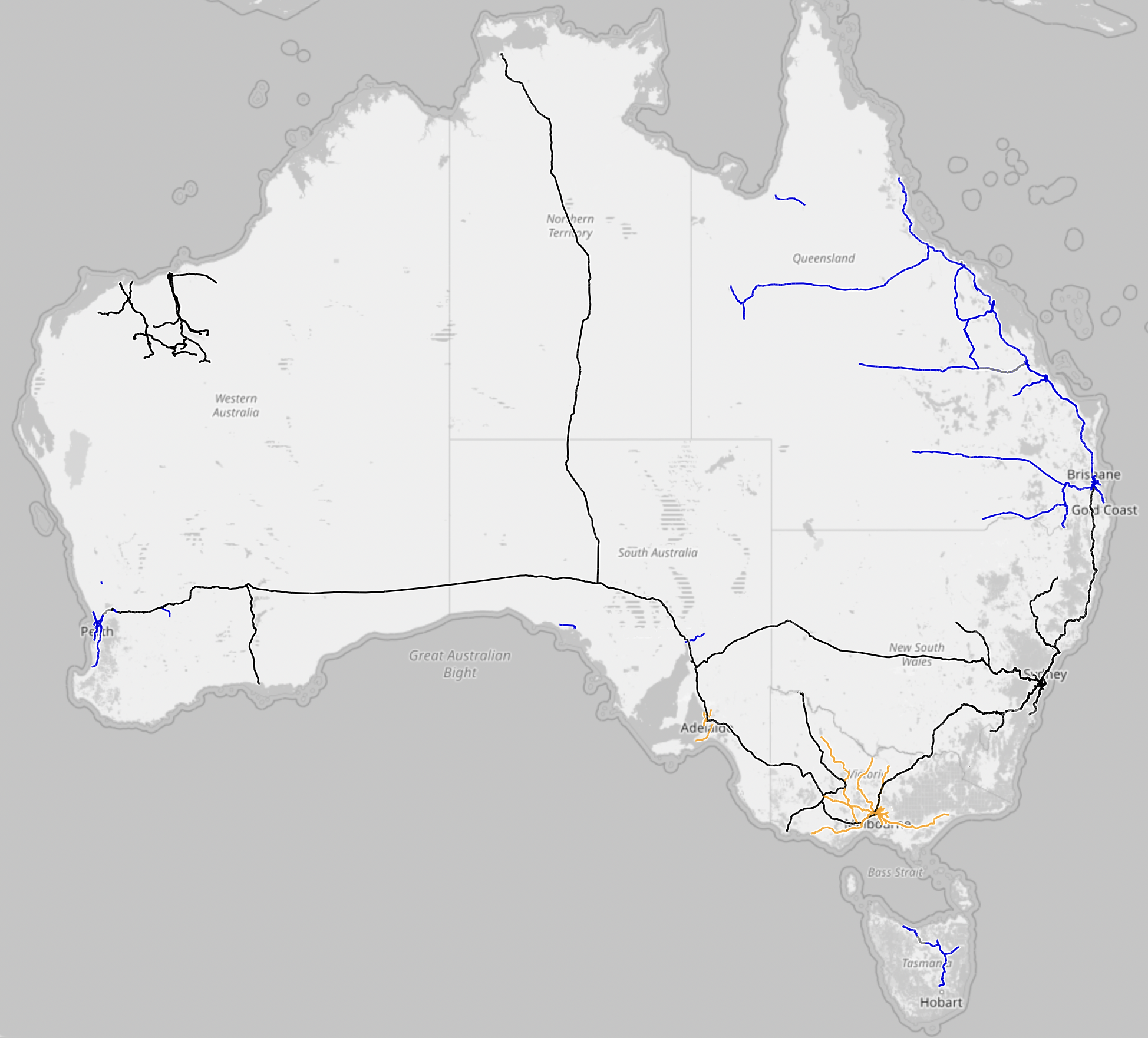
The three Australian mainline track gauges as of 2022 Narrow gauge (1067 mm) Standard gauge (1435 mm) Broad gauge (1600 mm)

Three mainline rail gauges in Australia were initiated in the very early years of railway development and remain in operation today. The diversity of track gauges – the distance between the inner rail edges – arose at a time when the respective colonies were building lines mainly to transport agricultural produce or minerals to ports. The colonies competed fiercely over trade with the United Kingdom and were quite isolationist in their attitude to each other.

During the 1850s, the local unavailability of anyone with knowledge of rail transport, including the relative advantages and disadvantages of particular gauges and the best track design, made decisions about the choice of gauge very difficult. Additionally, a change of mind by the colony of New South Wales as to the gauge of its first railway immediately conflicted with the projects already under way in South Australia and Victoria. The first of innumerable attempts to unify the gauges, often by engineers, occurred in 1857. However, politicians had little interest in standardising gauges; they applied unrelenting pressure to attain maximum development of railways at least possible construction cost.

When the Australian colonies federated in 1901 and trade barriers between the states were removed, the short-sightedness of having three gauges became very apparent. Even so, years of procrastination followed, in which the national and state legislatures put off the important decisions, engaging – usually after strong disagreement – in small projects only. In 1937, travel from Brisbane to Perth involved the discomfort of four railway systems, three gauges, and changes of train at eight stations. It would be 1995 before standard-gauge rails connected all the mainland state capitals – but regional routes remained largely unconverted. As of 2024, there were 10,923 kilometres (6787 mi) of 1067 mm (3 ft 6 in) narrow gauge, 17,544.3 kilometres (10,901.5 mi) of 1435 mm (4 ft 8 1/2 in) standard gauge, 2481.5 kilometres (1541.9 mi) of broad gauge and 263.8 kilometres (163.9 miles) of dual-gauge track: in all, 31,212.6 kilometres (19,394.6 miles) (Note: Exclusive of sugar-cane lines.)

== Rail gauges and route kilometres ==
A report by the Australian Government’s Bureau of Infrastructure, Transport and Regional Economics, and the Australasian Railway Association, estimated that as of December 2024, there were 31,212.6 km (19,394.6 mi) of heavy rail lines open and operational throughout the nation.

The three main railway gauges in Australia are narrow: 1,067 mm (3 ft 6 in), standard: 1,435 mm (4 ft 8 1/2 in), and broad: 1,600 mm (5 ft 3 in). A slow progression towards unification to standard gauge has taken place since the 1930s.

About 4,000 km (2,500 mi) of 610 mm (2 ft) light railways in Queensland support the sugar-cane industry. They are not included in the following table.

Estimate of route kilometres of operational heavy railways in Australia, December 2024 (Note: Excludes light rail (tram lines) and sugar cane lines.)
| State or territory | Narrow 1067mm | Standard 1435mm | Broad 1600mm | Dual | Total |
|---|---|---|---|---|---|
| Australian Capital Territory | | 7.5 | | | 7.5 |
| New South Wales | | 6,668.8 | 73 | | 6,741.8 |
| Northern Territory | | 1,690 | | | 1,690 |
| Queensland | 7,600.6 | 117.1 | | 37.1 | 7,754.7 |
| South Australia | 66 | 2,605.8 | 127.1 | | 2,798.9 |
| Tasmania | 614.4 | | | | 614.4 |
| Victoria | | 1,805.5 | 2,281.4 | 53.3 | 4,140.2 |
| Western Australia | 2,642.1 | 4,649.7 | | 173.5 | 7,465.2 |
| Total | 10,923 | 17,544.3 | 2,481.5 | 263.8 | 31,212.6 |

== History ==
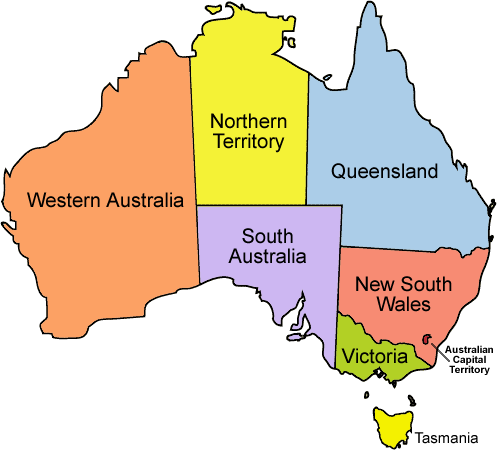
The states and mainland territories of Australia. Their development as separate colonies in the 19th century resulted in three mainline gauges.

=== Pre-construction decisions ===
In 1845, a Royal Commission on Railway Gauges in the United Kingdom was formed to report on the desirability for a uniform gauge. As a result, the Regulating the Gauge of Railways Act 1846 was passed which prescribed the use of 4 ft 8 1/2 in (1435 mm) in England, Scotland and Wales (with the exception of the Great Western Railway) and 5 ft 3 in (1600 mm) in Ireland.

In 1846, Australian newspapers discussed the break of gauge problem in the United Kingdom, especially for defence. In 1847, South Australia adopted the 4 ft 8 1/2 in gauge as law.

In 1848, the Governor of New South Wales, Charles Fitzroy, was advised by the Secretary of State for the Colonies in London, Earl Grey, that one uniform gauge should be adopted in Australia, this being the British standard 4 ft 8 1/2 in gauge. The recommendation was adopted by the then three colonies. Grey noted in his letter that South Australia had already adopted this gauge.

At this stage, South Australia was no longer part of NSW, while Victoria and Queensland were still part of New South Wales.

Since the Australian Overland Telegraph Line and under-sea cable communications with England did not open until 1872, communications between Britain and Australia before then were hampered by having to be conducted via sailing ship. The journey varied from about seven months on slower ships to about two and a half months on fast clipper ships. This had particular consequences for the selection of railway gauge in Australia.

=== Origins of the gauge muddle ===
At that time, the private Sydney Railway Company had begun planning its railway line to Parramatta. The chief engineer of the company was Irish-born Francis Webb Sheilds. After his appointment in 1849, Sheilds initially stated a preference for 5 ft 6 in (1,676 mm) but in 1850 he persuaded the company, which in turn asked the NSW legislature, to change to the Irish standard gauge of 5 ft 3 in (1,600 mm). This decision was endorsed by the NSW Governor, and Colonial Secretary Earl Grey in London agreed in 1851.

However, Sheilds and his three subordinates resigned in December 1850 when the company cut their salaries for financial reasons. After the interim appointment of Henry Mais in July 1852, the company selected a new Scottish engineer, James Wallace, who preferred the British standard gauge. The government was persuaded to make the change back to 4 ft 8 1/2 in and in January 1853 they advised the company that the Act requiring 5 ft 3 in (1,600 mm) would be repealed.

In February 1853, the other colonies (Victoria having separated from New South Wales in 1851) were sent a memorandum advising them of the pending change and recommended they likewise adopt 4 ft 8 1/2 in. In Victoria, the memorandum was distributed to three railway companies and their responses were sought, with two replying and only one showing a distinct preference for 5 ft 3 in (1,600 mm). However, the Melbourne and Hobson's Bay Railway Company asked for a determination from the government as it had prepared plans for both gauges and was due to send an order for locomotives and rolling stock to England by boat at the start of April. In reply at the end of March, the companies were told the colonial Victorian government preferred 5 ft 3 in (1,600 mm) and the order was subsequently placed.

In July 1853, the Government of Victoria advised New South Wales that it would use the broader gauge and later appealed to the British Government to force a reversal of New South Wales' decision. Subsequently, the Melbourne and Hobson's Bay Railway Company opened the first railway in Australia in 1854, as a 5 ft 3 in (1,600 mm) broad gauge line, and the South Australian Railways used the same gauge on its first steam-hauled railway in 1856.

Despite a request by the Secretary of State for the Colonies to reconsider this alteration, in 1855, the NSW Governor William Denison gave the go-ahead for the 4 ft 8 1/2 in Sydney to Parramatta railway, which opened in September of that year.

Concerns over the gauge difference began to be raised almost immediately. At a Select Committee called in Victoria in September 1853, a representative of the railway company which had not replied to Charles La Trobe's earlier memorandum, reported a preference for 5 ft 3 in (1,600 mm), but when asked if Victoria should follow NSW he answered: "We must, I conclude of necessity, do so". In 1857, the NSW railway engineer John Whitton suggested that the short length of railway then operating in New South Wales be altered from 4 ft 8 1/2 in gauge to 5 ft 3 in (1,600 mm) to conform with Victoria but, despite being supported by the NSW Railway Administration, he was ignored. At that time, there were only 23 miles (37 km) of track, four engines and assorted cars and wagons on the railway. However, by 1889, New South Wales, under engineer Whitton, had built almost 1,950 miles (3,500 km) of standard gauge line.

=== Extension of the gauge muddle ===
The 3 ft 6 in (1,067 mm) narrow gauge was introduced to Australia in 1865, when the Queensland Railways opened its first railway from Ipswich to Grandchester. The gauge was chosen on the supposition that it would be constructed more cheaply, faster and on tighter curves than the wider gauges. This was the first narrow gauge main line in the world.

South Australia first adopted this gauge in 1867 with its line from Port Wakefield to Hoyleton. The main reasons for choosing this were reduced cost, and the expectation that the narrow gauge would never connect to broad gauge lines. Overbuilt English railways were criticised. The Wakefield line was also envisaged as a horse-drawn tramway.

Later narrow gauge lines went towards Broken Hill and to Oodnadatta and from Mount Gambier. The Port Lincoln system was always isolated by geography which went through non-paying desert.

The Western Australian Government Railways adopted it in 1879 for its first line from Geraldton to Northampton.

The Tasmanian Government Railways opened its first railway from Launceston to Deloraine in 1871 using 5 ft 3 in (1,600 mm) broad gauge, but converted to 3 ft 6 in (1,067 mm) narrow gauge in 1888.

=== Towards a continental network ===
Until the 1880s, the gauge issue was not a major problem, as there were no connections between the separate systems. The focus of railway traffic was movement from the hinterland to the ports and cities on the coast, so governments were not concerned about the future need for either inter-city passenger or freight services. It was not until 1883 when the broad and standard gauge lines from Melbourne and Sydney met at Albury, and in 1888, narrow and standard gauge from Brisbane and Sydney met at Wallangarra that the break of gauge became an issue.

The issue of rail gauge was mentioned in an 1889 military defence report authored by British army officer Major General James Bevan Edwards, who said that the full benefit of the railways would not be attained until a uniform gauge was established. Until the turn of the 20th century, the benefits of a uniform gauge were not immediately apparent, since passengers had to pass through customs and immigration at the intercolonial border, meaning that all goods would have to be removed for customs inspection. It was only with Federation in 1901 and its introduction of free trade between the states that the impediment of different gauges became apparent.

== Post Federation ==
At the time of Federation, standard gauge was used only in NSW, but was favoured for future construction. Work on gauge conversion was assisted by section 51 (xxxiii) of the Constitution of Australia, which made specific provisions for the Commonwealth Parliament to make laws with respect to railway acquisition and construction. An agreement was made with the South Australian and Western Australian state governments for the Trans-Australian Railway from Port Augusta to Kalgoorlie, with work started in 1911 and completed in 1917. However, with the different gauges, to transport goods from Queensland to Perth required four transhipments.

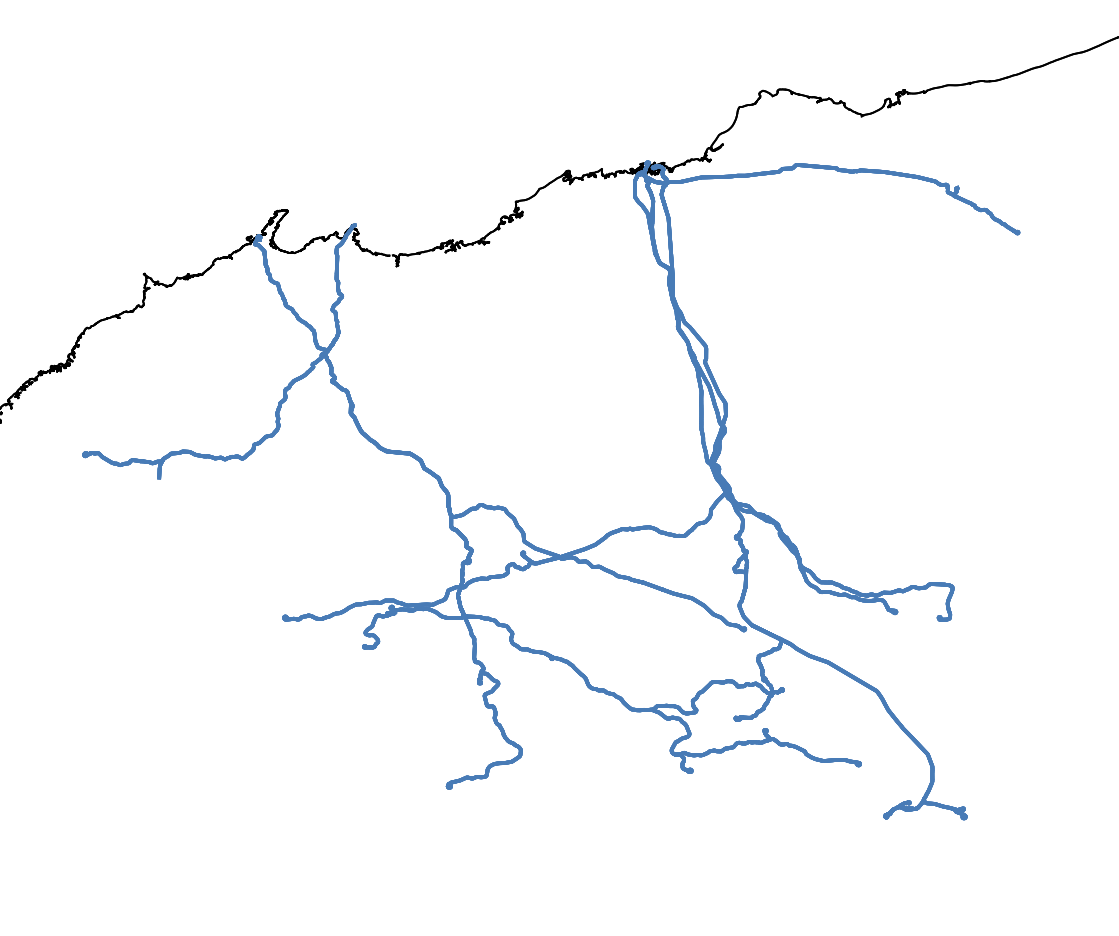
Western Australia Pilbara railway track gauges

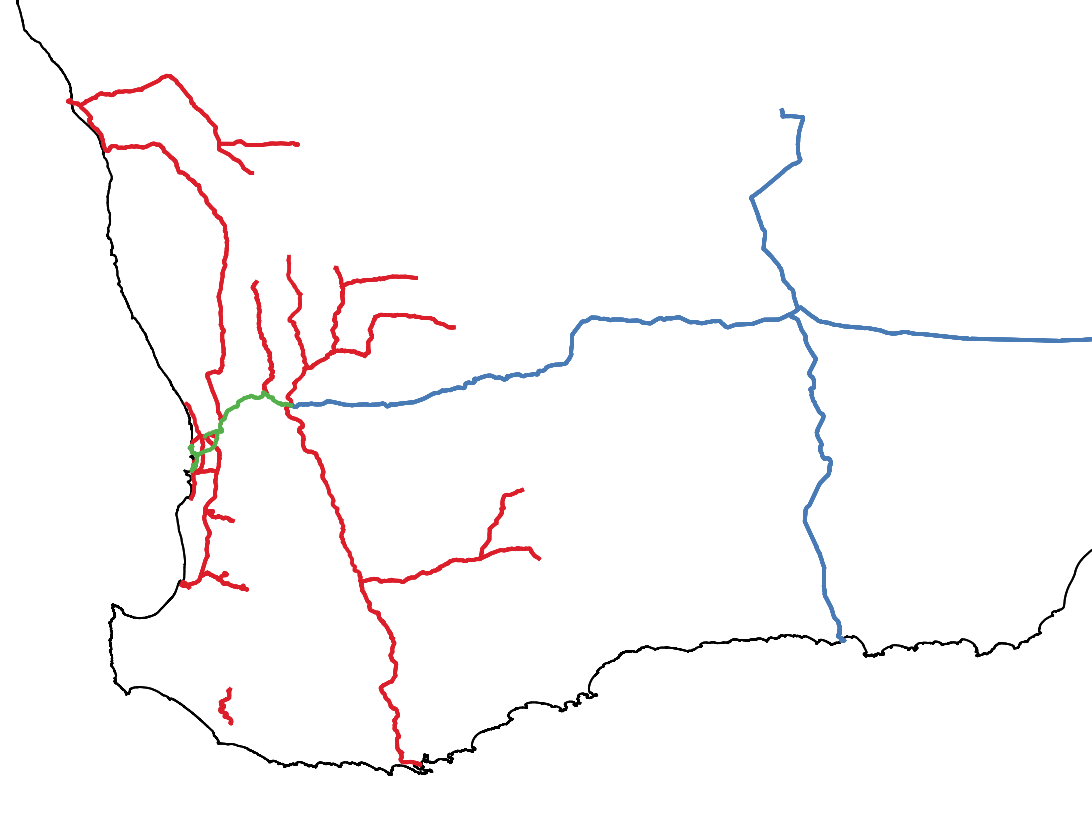
Western Australia South West railway track gauges

=== 1921 royal commission ===
In October 1921, a royal commission into uniform rail gauge recommended gauge conversion of large areas of the country and that:

- the gauge of 4 feet 8 1/2 inches be adopted as the standard
- no mechanical, third rail, or other device would meet the situation
- uniformity could be secured by one means only, viz., by conversion of the gauges other than 4 ft 8 1/2 in.

The subject was discussed at a conference of the Prime Minister with the Premiers in November 1921, when it was decided to adopt 4 ft 8 1/2 in as the standard gauge for Australia and it was resolved that adoption of a uniform gauge was essential to the development and safety of the nation.

Following the royal commission, agreements were made for the standard gauge NSW North Coast line to be extended from Kyogle to South Brisbane (completed in 1930) and for the Trans-Australian Railway to be extended from Port Augusta to Port Pirie (completed 1937).

By the outbreak of World War II in 1939, there were still 14 break-of-gauge locations, with upwards of 1600 service personnel and many more civilians employed to transfer 1.8 million tons of freight during the conflict. The breaks of gauge were at the following places:

| Location | State | Gauge | | |
| Location | State | Narrow | Standard | Broad |
|---|---|---|---|---|
| South Brisbane | Queensland | x | x | |
| Wallangarra | Queensland | x | x | |
| Albury | New South Wales | | x | x |
| Oaklands | New South Wales | | x | x |
| Tocumwal | New South Wales | | x | x |
| Broken Hill | New South Wales | x | x | |
| Mount Gambier | South Australia | x | | x |
| Serviceton | Victoria | x | | x |
| Terowie | South Australia | x | | x |
| Peterborough | South Australia | x | x | x |
| Gladstone | South Australia | x | x | x |
| Port Pirie | South Australia | x | x | x |
| Port Augusta | South Australia | x | x | |
| Dynon | Victoria | | x | x |
| Kalgoorlie | Western Australia | x | x | |

- Hamley Bridge ceased to be a break of gauge point in 1927 when the broad gauge was extended to Gladstone.
- Dynon near Melbourne replaced Albury when the standard gauge was extended to Melbourne in 1961.
- South Brisbane ceased to be a break of gauge point when the NSW North Coast line was extended over the Merivale Bridge to Roma Street in 1986.
- Acacia Ridge was developed as a break-of-gauge yard in Brisbane in the 1970s to relieve overcrowding at Clapham goods station, which is opposite the Moorooka passenger station.
- The NSW North Coast line from Acacia Ridge to Bromelton was dual gauged in 2009 as part of the Nucleus Transmodal Hub to relieve overcrowding at Acacia Ridge.

=== Break-of-gauge devices ===
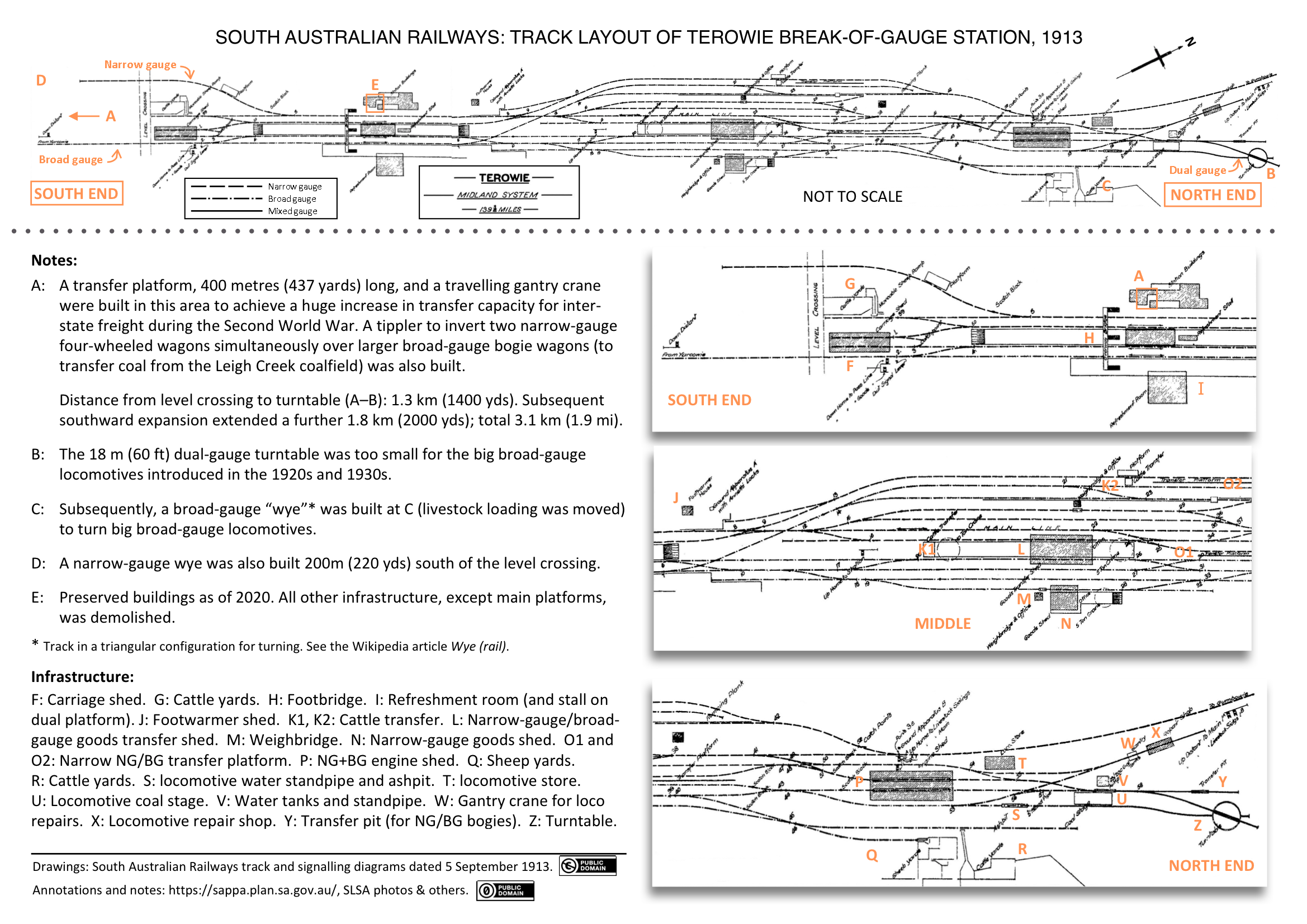
Track layout diagram of Terowie break-of-gauge station (South Australian Railways), 1913

In 1922, 273 inventions to solve the break-of-gauge had been proposed, and none adopted. In 1933, as many as 140 devices were proposed by inventors to solve the break-of-gauge problem, none of which was adopted.

Even dual gauge with a third rail for combining Irish gauge and standard gauge was rejected as too reckless, as the gap between these gauges of 6.5 inches (165 mm) was considered to be too small. Dual gauge combining Irish gauge and narrow gauge where the gap was 21 in (530 mm) was also rejected.

=== Opposition to a third rail ===
Although Prime Minister Billy Hughes had expressed support for the idea of a third rail solving the break of gauge difficulty, the predominant opinion of senior officers of the railways was to oppose it.

=== Clapp Report ===
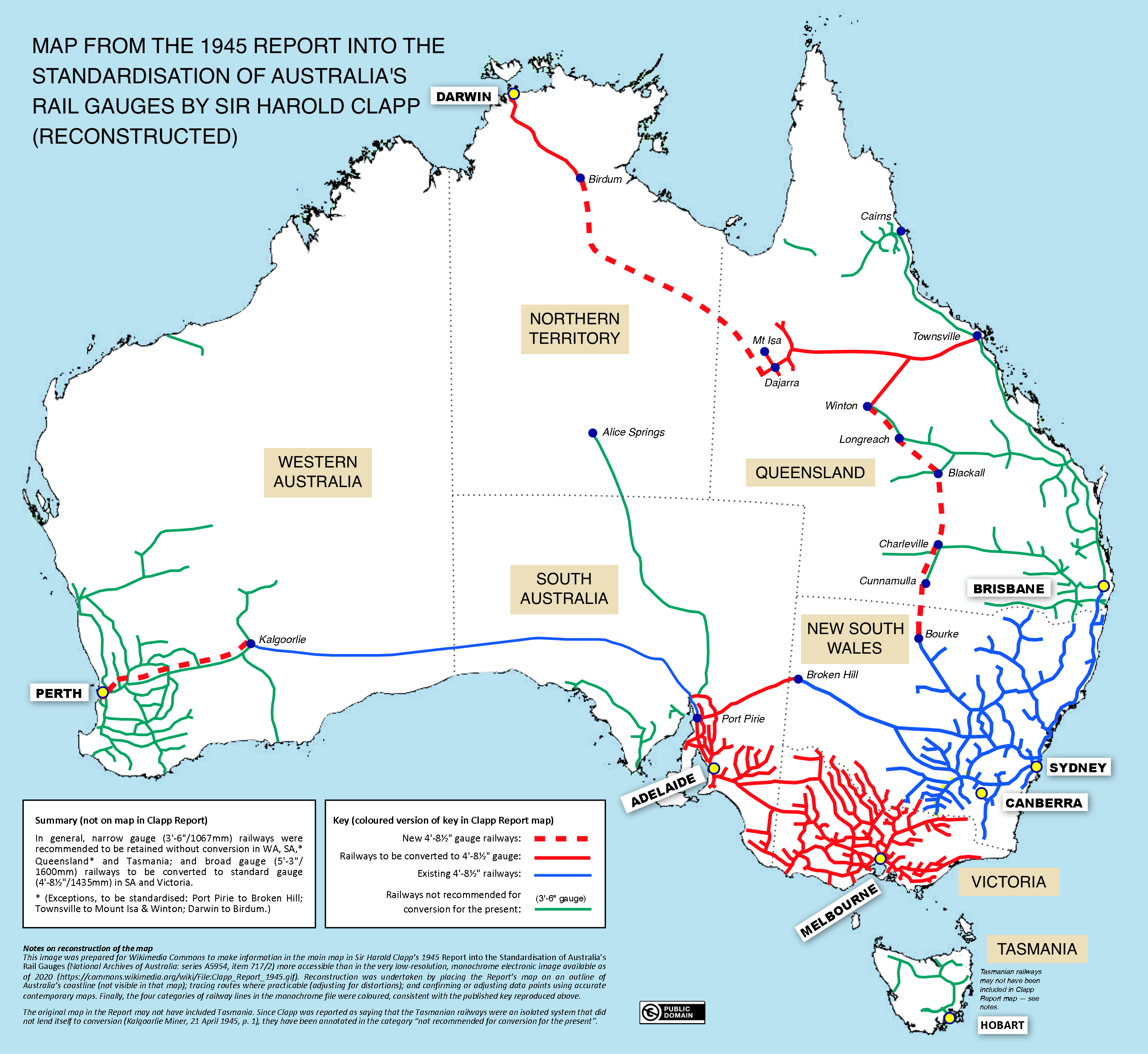
A map (reconstructed) of the 1945 Clapp Report proposals for standardisation of Australia's railways. (Click to enlarge.)

After the wartime experience, a report into the Standardisation of Australia's rail gauges was completed by former Victorian Railways Chief Commissioner Harold Clapp for the Commonwealth Land Transport Board in March 1945. It included three main proposals:

- Gauge standardisation from Fremantle and Perth to Kalgoorlie, all of South Australian and Victorian broad gauge lines, all of the South Australian south east and Peterborough division narrow gauge lines, and acquisition and conversion of the Silverton Tramway. Costed at £44.3 million.
- A new standard gauge "strategic and developmental railway" from Bourke, New South Wales to Townsville, Queensland and Dajarra (near Mount Isa) with new branch lines from Bourke via Barringun, Cunnamulla, Charleville, Blackall to Longreach. Existing narrow gauge lines in Queensland would be gauge converted, including Longreach – Linton – Hughenden – Townsville Dajarra and associated branches. Costed at £21.6 million.
- A new standard gauge line to Darwin, including a new line from Dajarra, Queensland to Birdum, Northern Territory, and a gauge conversion of the Birdum to Darwin narrow gauge line. Costed at £10.9 million.

The report wrote that if only main trunk lines were converted, it would introduce a multitude of break of gauge terminals and result in greatly increased costs. It also recommended abandoning part of the existing Perth to Kalgoorlie narrow gauge line, and build a flatter and straighter route using third rail dual gauge, as modernisation was just as important as standardisation.

South Australia was unhappy with the report, as the link to the Northern Territory would not run through its state. Western Australia and Queensland both saw no advantage in the report, as they already had a common gauge in their states, and only one main break of gauge. NSW entered into the agreement to advance gauge standardisation in Victoria and South Australia, but did not ratify it.

Gauge conversion continued, with the South Australian Railways' Mount Gambier line from Wolseley to Mount Gambier and associated branches converted to broad gauge in the 1950s, on the understanding it would change again to standard gauge at a later date, which would have made it the first and only railway in Australia to have successfully been converted to all three gauges. It closed in 1995. Standard gauge lines were also built, with the line between Stirling North and Marree opened in July 1957.

=== Wentworth Committee ===
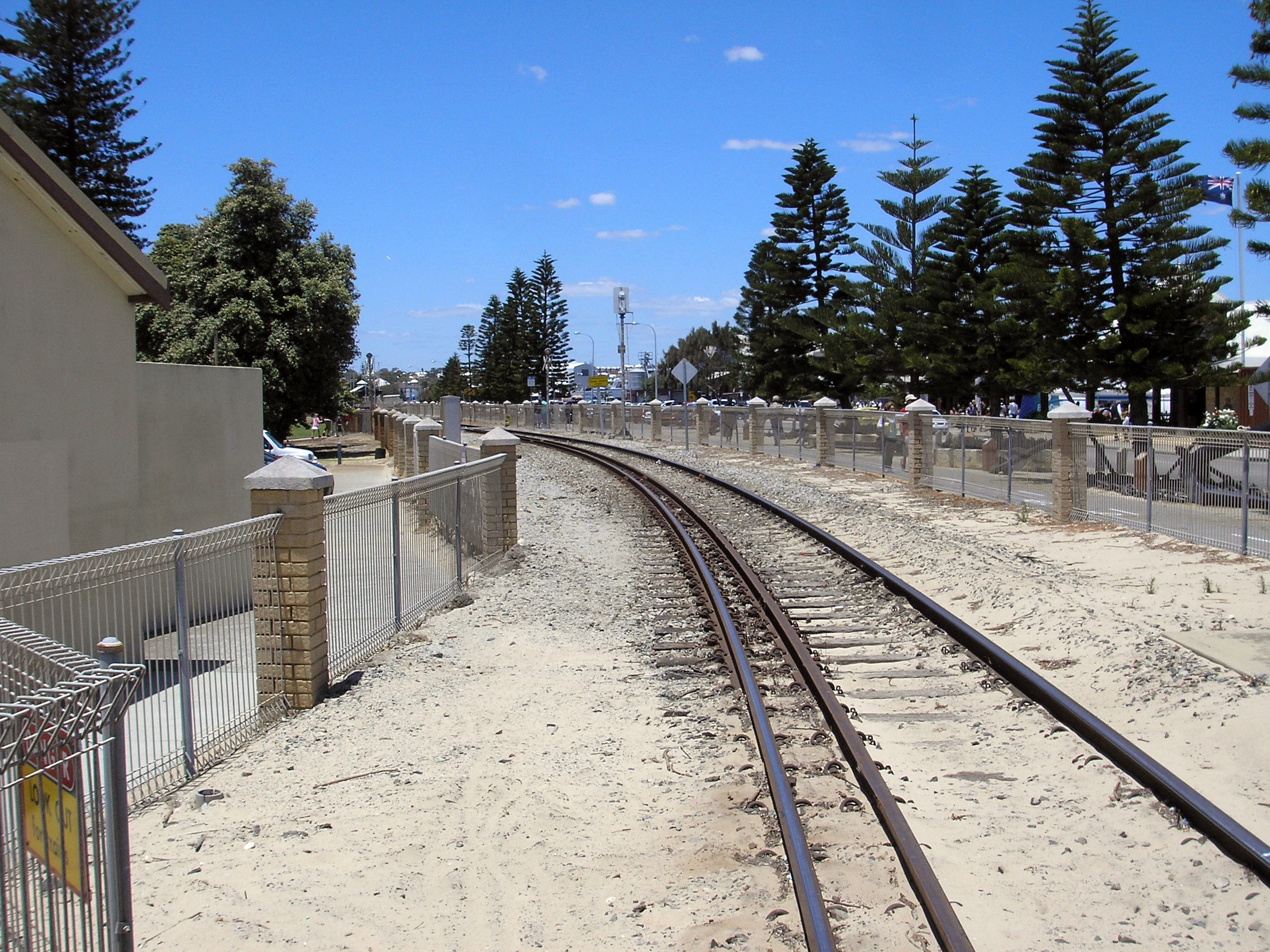
Dual gauge 1,067 mm (3 ft 6 in) & (1,435 mm (4 ft 8 1/2 in) track on the Eastern Railway in December 2005

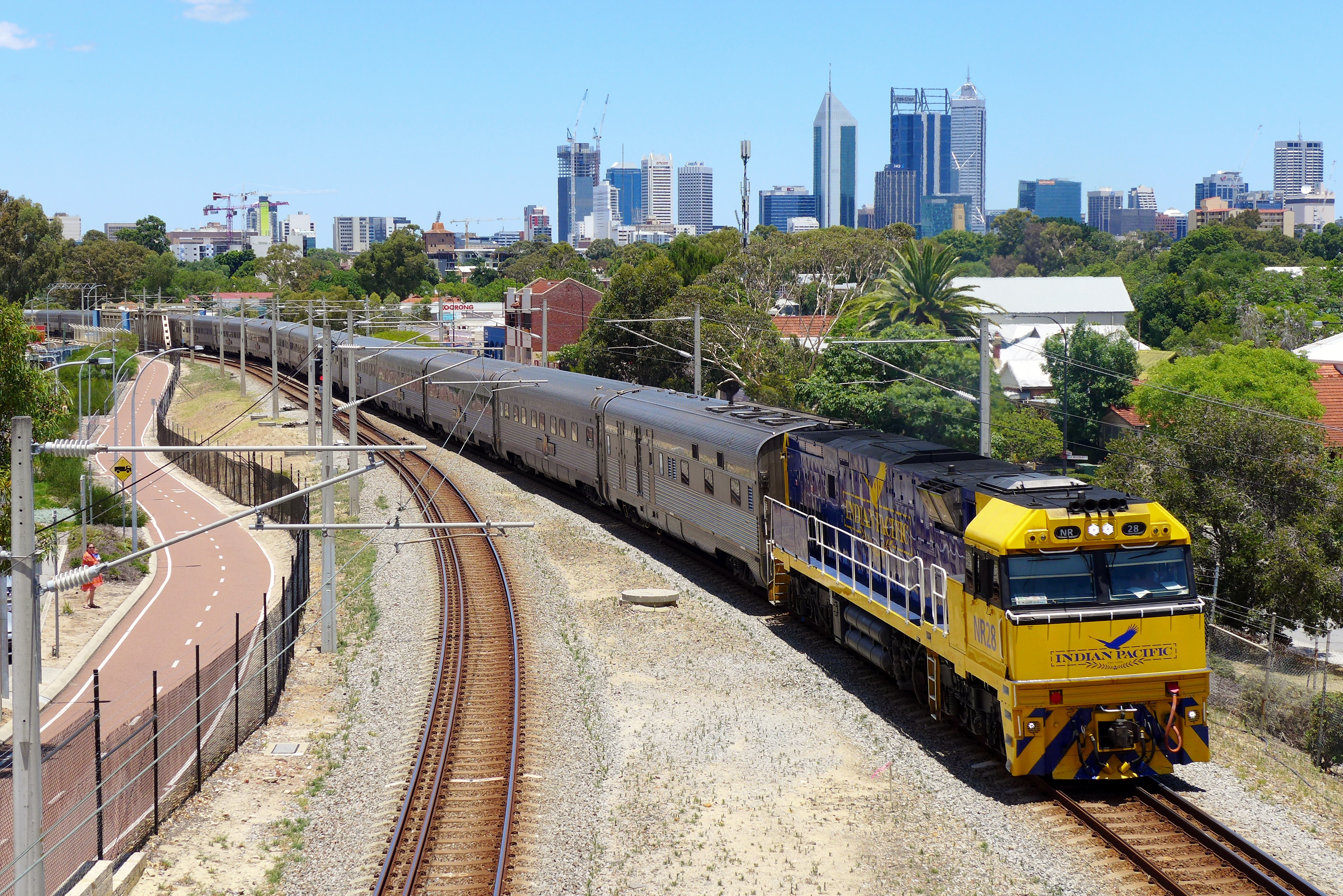
Dual gauge 1,067 mm (3 ft 6 in) and (1,435 mm (4 ft 8 1/2 in) Eastern Railway in Perth with an Indian Pacific service in December 2014

In 1956, a Government Members Rail Standardisation Committee was established, chaired by William Wentworth MP. It found that while there was still considerable doubt as to the justification for large scale gauge conversion, there was no doubt that work on some main trunk lines was long overdue. Both the committee and the government strongly supported three standardisation projects at a cost of £41.5 million:

- Albury to Melbourne (priority 1)
- Broken Hill to Adelaide via Port Pirie (priority 2, built third)
- Kalgoorlie to Perth and Fremantle (priority 3, built second)

The Commonwealth, NSW and Victorian governments were first to start work, with the first freight train operating on the converted North East line to Melbourne operating in January 1962 and the first through passenger train in April 1962. Over the next 12 months, net freight tonnage was up 32.5%. To 1973, there was an average increase of 8.6%.

The work in Western Australia was predicated by an agreement entered into in November 1960 between the state government and BHP for a standard gauge line to be built to allow iron ore from Koolyanobbing to be shipped to a new steel mill at Kwinana. A new dual gauge line was built through the Avon Valley from Midland to Northam on 1 in 200 grades instead of 1 in 40. A new line was built from Southern Cross to Kalgoorlie though Koolyanobbing.

The first wheat train ran from Merredin to Fremantle in November 1966. The first iron ore train ran from Koolyanobbing to Kwinana in April 1967. The line opened in full in August 1969. Kalgoorlie to Perth freight train times were reduced from 31 hours to 13 hours, and passenger train times from 14 hours to 8 hours. A new line was built from Woodbridge to Kwinana. One of the tracks on the Fremantle line converted to dual track from Cockburn Junction to Fremantle Harbour. The Eastern Railway in Perth was converted to dual gauge and a new terminus station built.

In November 1971, following the discovery of rich nickel deposits, work started on converting the 640 kilometre line from Leonora to Esperance, including 90 kilometres of track on a new alignment. The work was completed in September 1974.

In South Australia, work on Port Pirie to Broken Hill started in 1963. The narrow gauge lines from Gladstone and Peterborough were not converted, with triple gauge yards provided. Standard gauge access to Adelaide was not provided. From Cockburn to Broken Hill a new railway was built on an improved alignment, avoiding the private Silverton Tramway route. The completion of this link enabled the first Indian Pacific to run across the nation in March 1970 from Sydney to Perth.

=== 1970s ===
A new line between Tarcoola and Alice Springs was given the go ahead by the Whitlam government in 1974. Built to replace the flood-prone narrow gauge Central Australia Railway, the 831 kilometre long line was completed in 1980.

=== 1980s ===
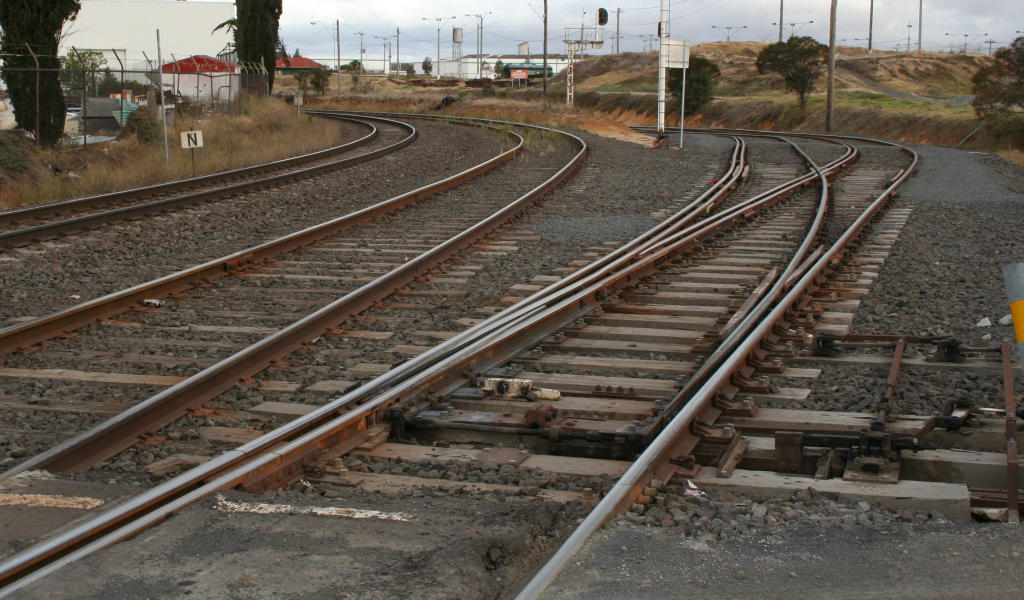
Dual gauge 1,435 mm (4 ft 8 1/2 in) and 1,600 mm (5 ft 3 in) track in Geelong

Work on standard gauge access to Adelaide started in 1982 with conversion of the broad gauge south of Red Hill. A new line went north of there to Crystal Brook, where it met the standard gauge line from Port Pirie to Broken Hill. Freight trains began using the line in 1983, and passenger trains in 1984, when Adelaide Parklands Terminal opened. With benefits exceeding the cost by 2.8 times over 25 years, Australian National was able to obtain a loan for the funding of the work.

=== 1990s ===
As part of the Keating government's One Nation project, the Melbourne-Adelaide railway line was converted to standard gauge in 1995. The Hopetoun, Portland and Yaapeet lines in Victoria, and the Pinnaroo, Loxton and Apamurra lines in South Australia were also gauge converted. The remaining isolated broad gauge and narrow gauge lines were closed, with the Mount Gambier and Mount Barker lines being the most controversial. The Fisherman Islands line was converted to dual gauge in 1997 to serve the Port of Brisbane.

== 21st century projects ==
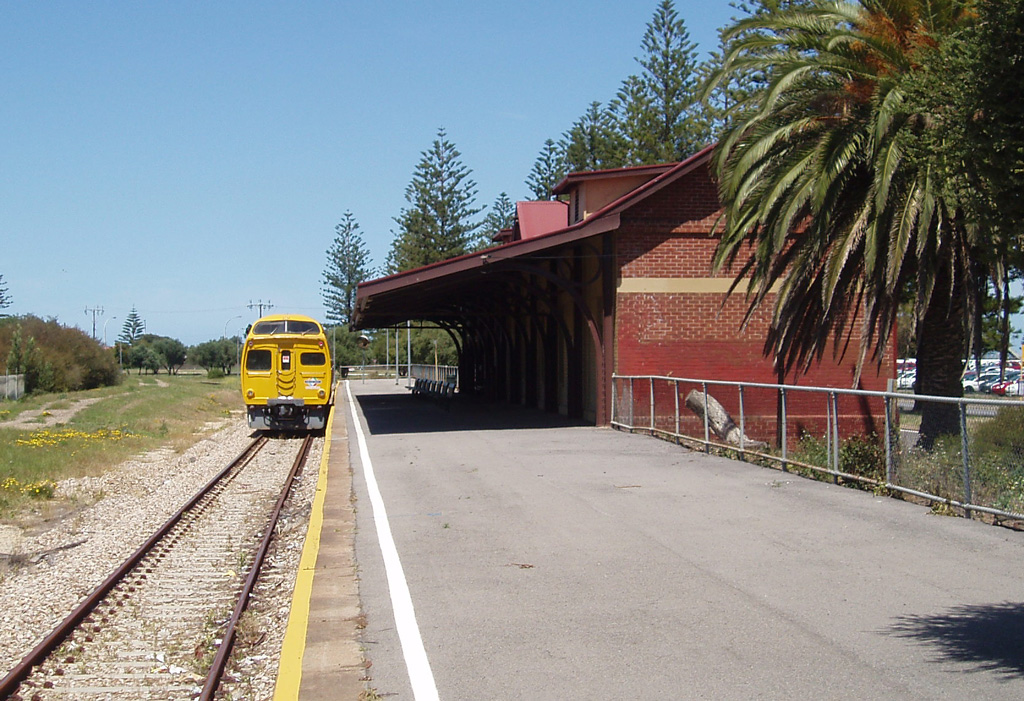
Outer Harbor station with gauge convertible sleepers in November 2005

Gauge conversion of 2,000 kilometres of track in Victoria was announced by the state government in May 2001 but did not proceed due to the difficulty of achieving any agreement with then track manager, Freight Australia. In 2010, 200 kilometres of the North East line in Victoria was gauge converted between Seymour and Albury. In the same year, standard gauge access was provided to the Port of Geelong, 13 years after the conversion to standard gauge of the Western standard gauge line between Melbourne and Adelaide, which runs through the northern suburbs of Geelong.

The Oaklands branch line was converted in 2009 to standard gauge as part of the project to standardise the North East line, to prevent that branch becoming isolated as an orphan.

To allow the creation of the Nucleus Transmodal Hub at Bromelton, Queensland, the Acacia Ridge to Bromelton section of the NSW North Coast line was converted to dual gauge in 2009, however it was not used until 2017.

In November 2012, Brookfield Rail completed an upgrade on the Morawa to Geraldton line with gauge convertible sleepers installed to allow for conversion in the future. The Mildura railway line and the Murrayville railway lines in Victoria were converted to standard gauge in 2018.

== Gallery ==
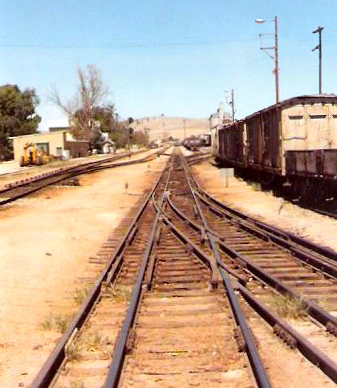
Triple gauge – 1067 mm (3 ft 6 in), 1435 mm (4 ft 8 1/2 in) and 1600 mm (5 ft 3 in) tracks at Gladstone (SA) in 1986

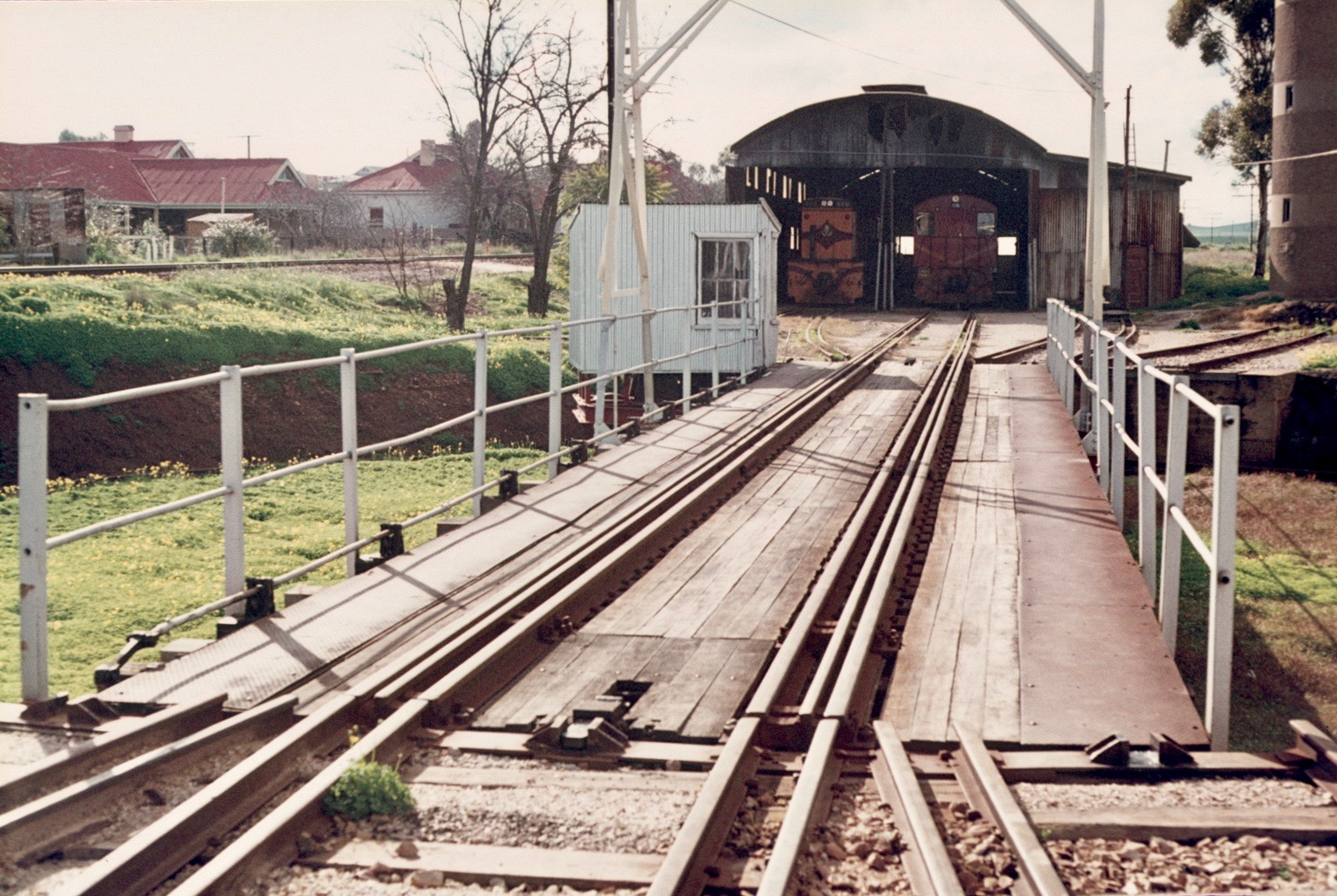
Triple-gauge track on turntable, Gladstone, South Australia

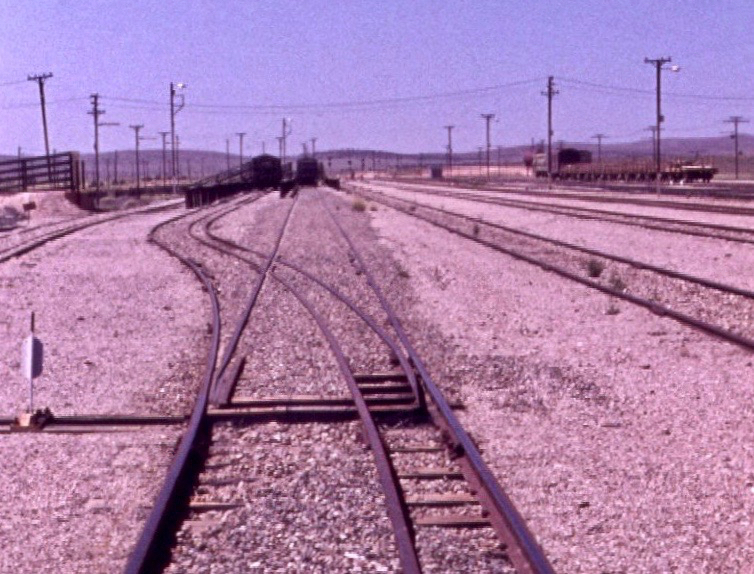
South Australian Railways broad and narrow gauge turnout -- both depart, BG ahead -- Gladstone (KNorgrove)

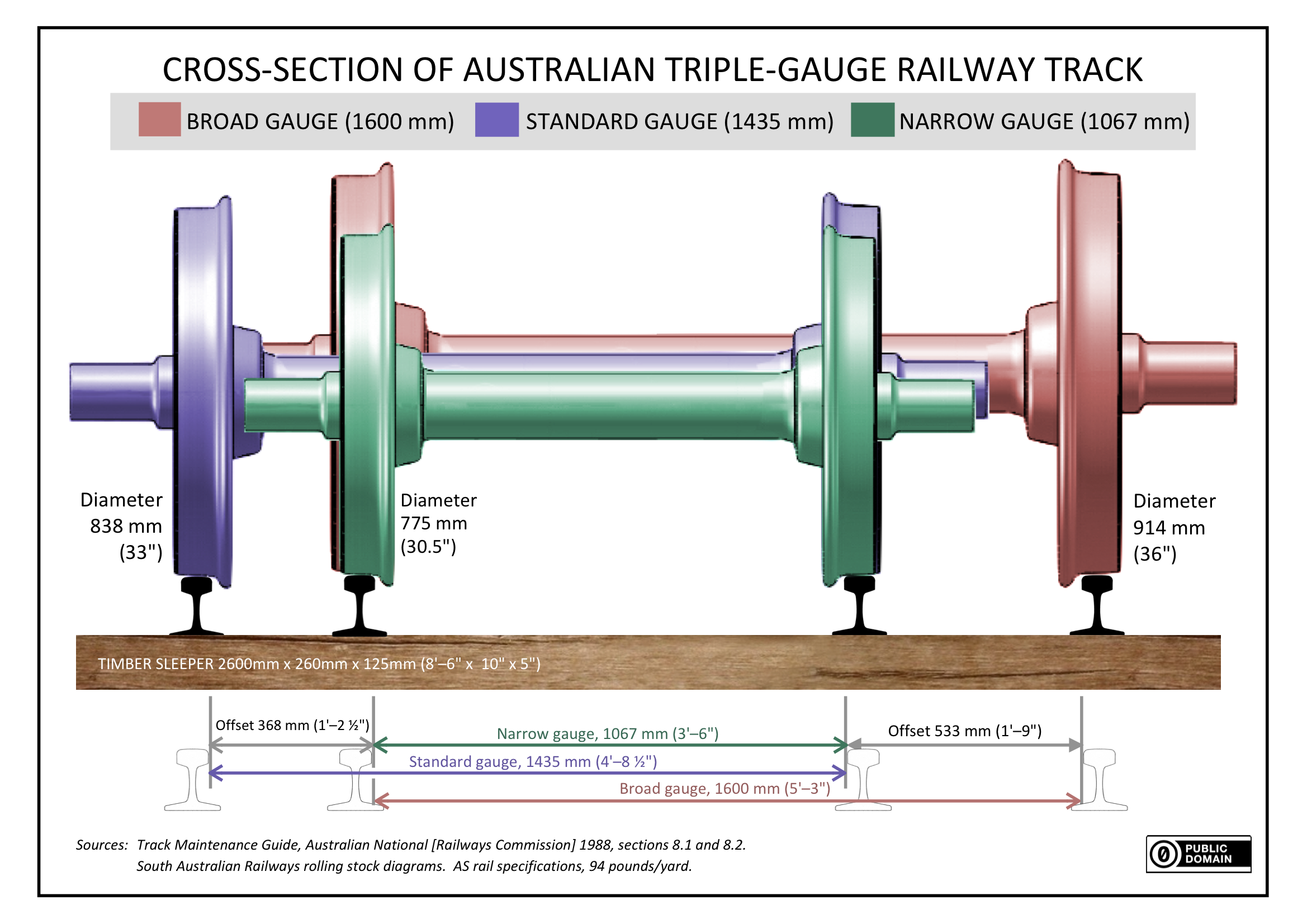
Cross-section dimensions of triple-gauge track at Gladstone and Peterborough, South Australia (click to enlarge)

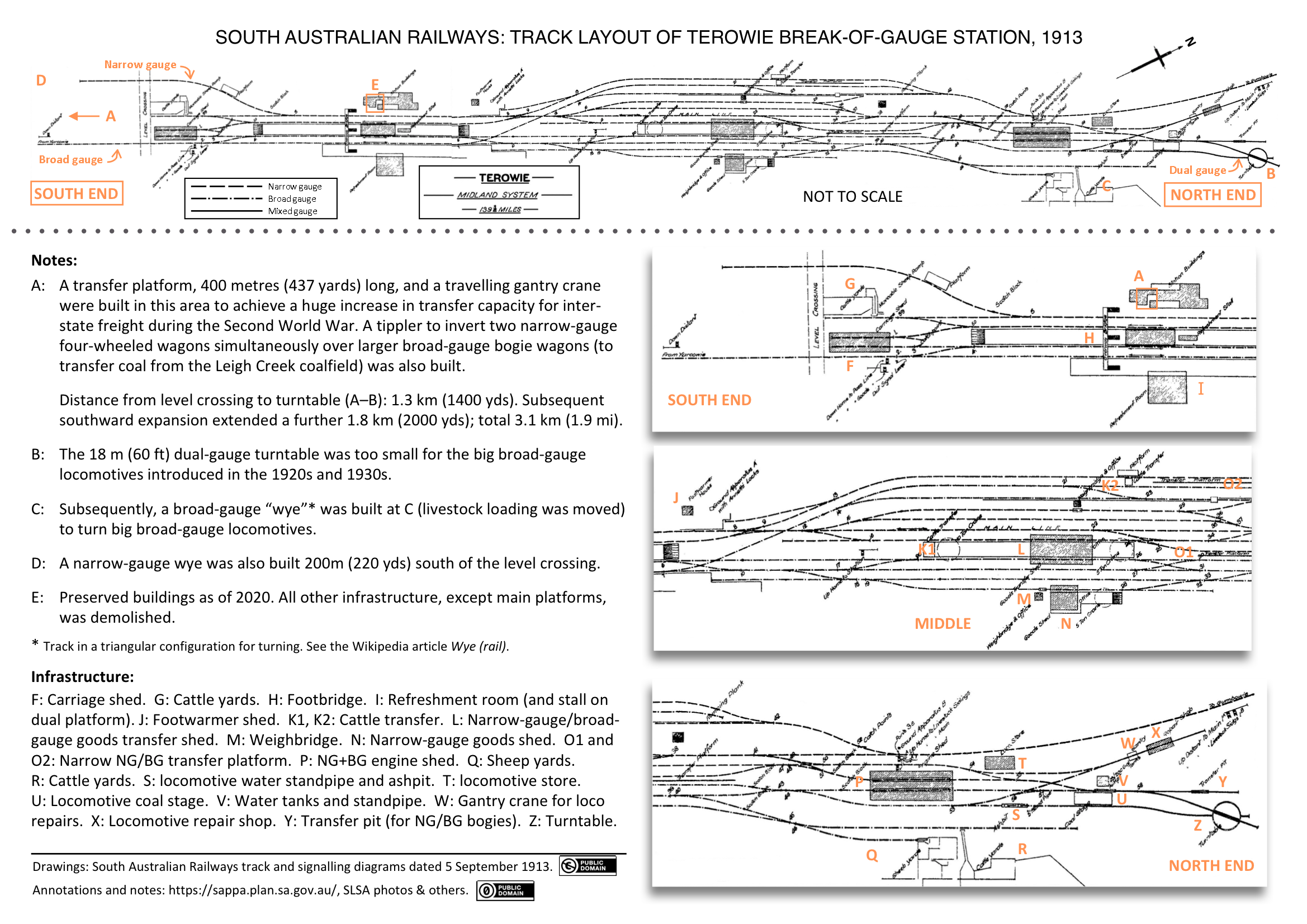
Track layout diagram of Terowie break-of-gauge station (South Australian Railways), 1913

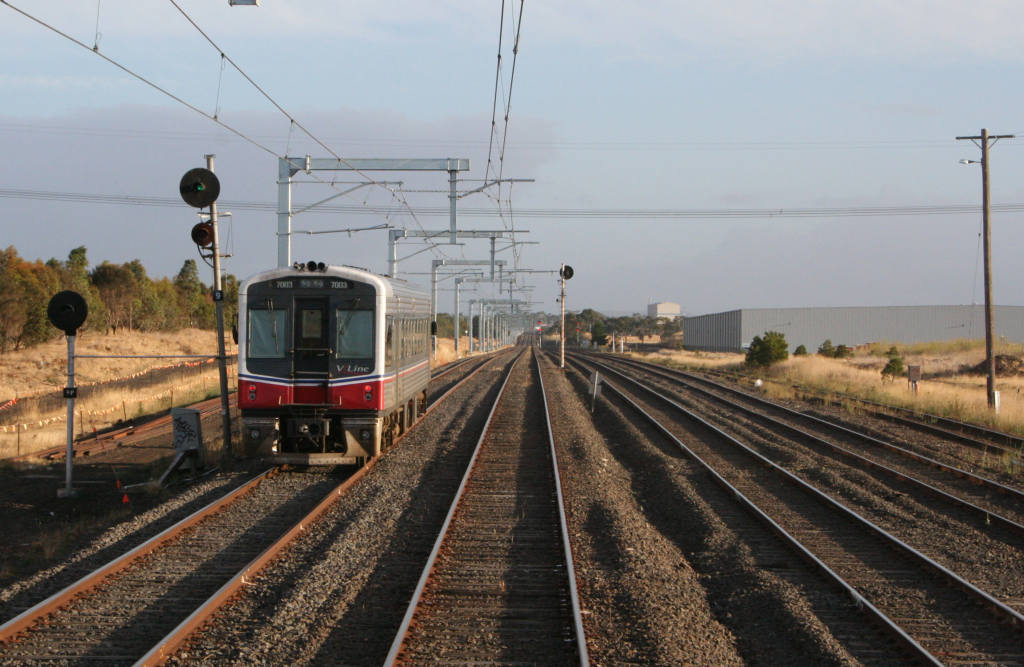
1600 mm (5 ft 3 in) Craigieburn line and 1435 mm (4 ft 8 1/2 in) North East line in Melbourne

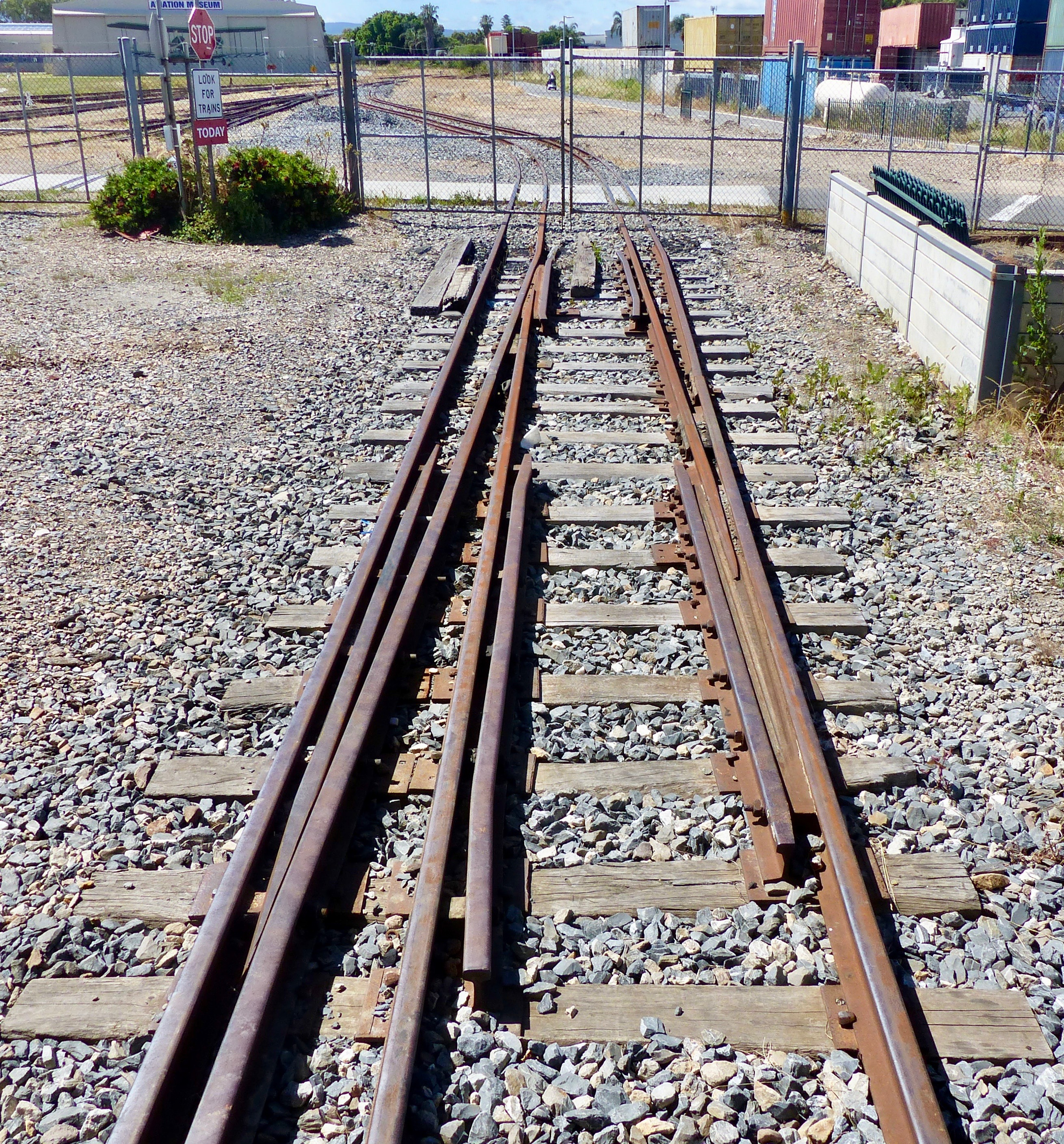
South Australian Railways triple-gauge change-over track, from one common rail to narrow gauge in middle

== Bibliography ==
- Mills, John Ayres (2007). The Myth of the Standard Guage: Rail Guage Choice in Australia, 1850-1901 (PDF) (PhD). ["Guage" sic.] Griffith University. doi:10.25904/1912/426.
- Mills, John Ayres (2010). "Australia's mixed gauge railway system: a reassessment of its origins". The Free Library. Royal Australian Historical Society.)
- Laird, Philip G. (2001). Back on track : rethinking transport policy in Australia and New Zealand. Sydney: UNSW Press. ISBN 0-86840-411-X. OCLC 48089074.
- Brady, I.A. (1971) A brief history of standard gauge in Australia Brady I. A. Australian Railway Historical Society Bulletin, May 1971 pp 98–120; June 1971 pp 131-139
- "Royal Commission on the matter of uniform railway gauge [1921] AURoyalC 4 (12 October 1921)". www.austlii.edu.au. 12 October 1921.
