= Biomega =

Biomega may refer to:

- Biomega (bicycles), a Copenhagen-based, Danish bicycle manufacturer
- Biomega (manga), a 2004–2009 cyberpunk action manga by Tsutomu Nihei
