= Lars Holme Larsen =

Danish designer

Lars Holme Larsen is a Danish designer, known for founding Danish industrial design studio Kilo Design and co-founding Danish design collaboration KiBiSi with Bjarke Ingels and Jens Martin Skibsted.

Larsen is a graduate of the Royal Danish Academy of Fine Arts. Alongside his design practice, he is a member of the Danish Design Council and has served on a number of award juries, including D&AD, core77 and Cannes Lions. His work is included in SFMOMA’s permanent collection, and he has received awards including the Danish Design Award, Red Dot, Good Design Award, IDEA Award, and a Cannes Lions golden trophy.
