= Terrafugia =

Chinese aircraft manufacturer

Terrafugia, Inc.
- Type: Subsidiary
- Industry: Aircraft manufacturing
- Founded: 2006; 20 years ago
- Founders: Carl Dietrich; Anna Mracek Dietrich; Samuel Schweighart; Alex Min; Arun Prakash
- Headquarters: Woburn, Massachusetts, United States
- Key people: Chao Jing, CEO; Kevin Colburn, VP & General Manager; Josh Elvander, VP Engineering
- Parent: Zhejiang Geely Holding Group
- Website: www.terrafugia.com

Terrafugia (/ˌtɛrəˈfuːdʒiə/) is a Chinese-owned corporation, based in Woburn, Massachusetts, United States that is developing the Transition and TF-X flying cars. The Transition and TF-X are designed to be able to fold their wings, enabling the vehicles to also operate as street-legal road vehicles.

In January 2021, Terrafugia announced that the Transition received a Special Light-Sport Aircraft (LSA) airworthiness certificate from the FAA for the Transition to be flown only, with road use approval to follow in 2022.

In February 2021 the company had laid off the majority of its employees, planned to close its US operations and re-establish in China.

== Founding and financial history ==
Terrafugia was founded by graduates of the Department of Aeronautics and Astronautics at the Massachusetts Institute of Technology and graduates of the MIT Sloan School of Management. Their team and business plan was the runner-up for the 2006 MIT $100K Entrepreneurship Competition. Terrafugia was then incorporated May 1, 2006, with much of the initial funding coming from CEO and founder Carl Dietrich's US$30,000 Lemelson-MIT Student Prize. The first round of convertible note financing began at EAA AirVenture Oshkosh 2006 and closed December 21, 2006, raising US$258,215. Five additional rounds of convertible note financing followed. The first round of equity financing closed in 2008 and raised US$1,531,323. Another round of equity financing was initially planned for 2009; the second and third rounds of equity financing raised US$2,037,680 in May, 2010 and US$960,418 in Dec, 2010. Another equity offering of US$3.5 million was reported in May, 2012 of which $1,020,369 had been sold. In October 2008, Terrafugia reported seeking reservations for airframe number 57 representing an order book of more than US$8 million. In March 2009, the company had received fewer than 35 aircraft reservations, but by September 2009, they had doubled that to 70; as of December 2011, 100 reservations were on deposit representing potential revenues above US$25 million.

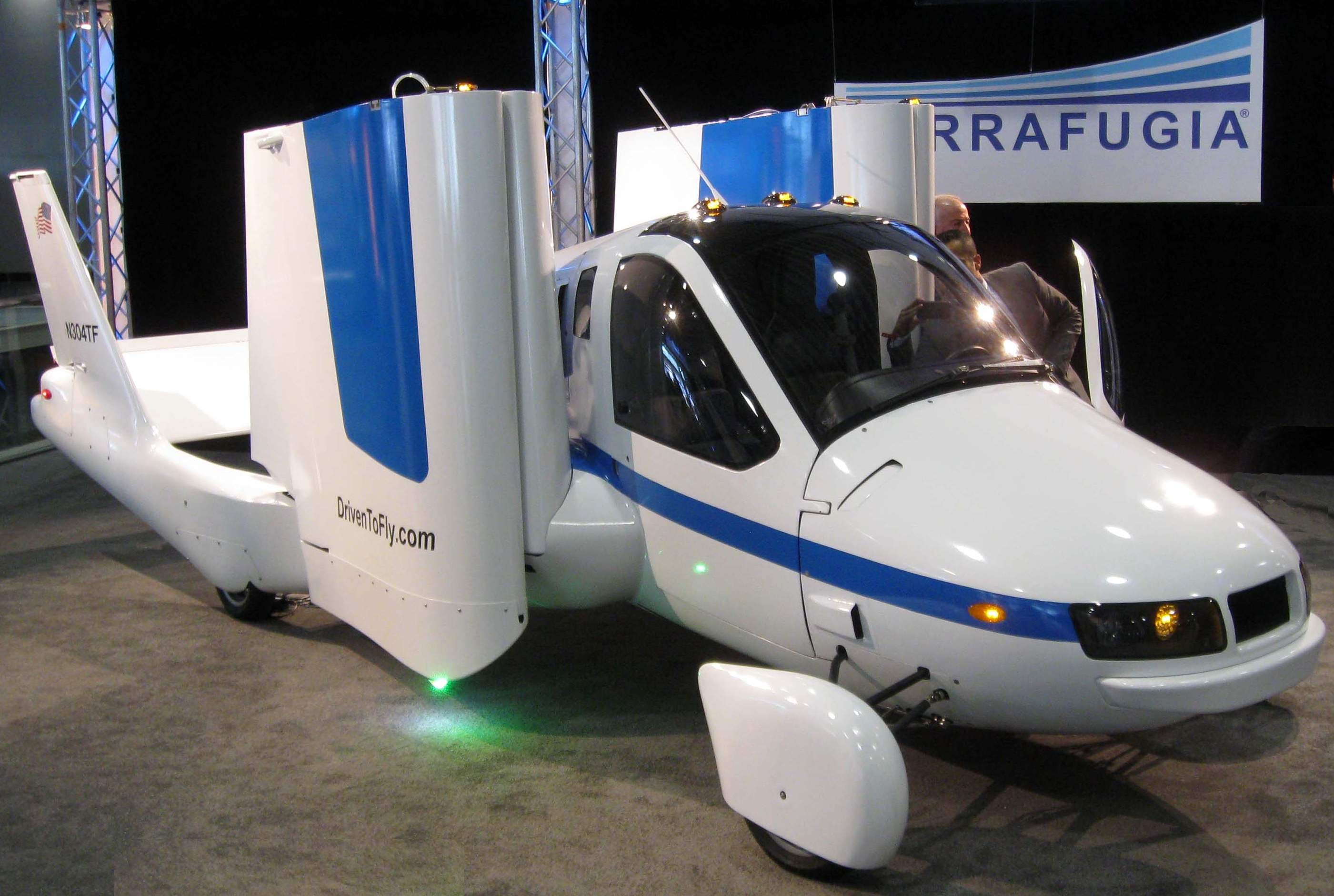
Production prototype Transition

In July 2017 the company was purchased by the Zhejiang Geely Holding Group, a Chinese corporate conglomerate that also owns the Volvo and Lotus Cars automobile companies, with the purchase finalized in November 2017.

The company started 2017 with 20 employees and hired 75 more people during the year. It planned to hire an additional 50 people by December 2018. During that period the company increased the staffing levels at its Woburn, Massachusetts, headquarters, expanding the work force in engineering, accounting, human resources, marketing and also operations. A new research and development division was also established in Petaluma, California, intended to undertake all future engineering tasks.

In September, 2018, Terrafugia replaced Carl Dietrich as CEO with Chris Jaran. Dietrich remained in the CTO position. In April 2019, the company replaced CEO Chris Jaran with Chao Jing. Huaibing Wang became CFO. Dietrich announced his departure from Terrafugia at the same time.

In February 2021 the company had reportedly laid off 80-100 of its employees, a majority of the people who worked there. The company planned to shut down its US operations and re-establish in China.

== Transition roadable aircraft ==
Terrafugia originally expected initial deliveries of the Transition light sport aircraft in 2015 or 2016. The estimated purchase price was originally announced as US$194,000 and was increased to US$279,000 as of December 2011. As a light sport aircraft, the pilot will be required to hold a Sport Pilot or higher certificate, which requires a minimum of 20 hours of dual instruction to obtain, as well as passing an FAA oral and practical examination. Owners will be able to drive amidst normal street traffic from their garage to an airport where the wings can be deployed for take-off and flight within a range of 460 miles (740 km; 400 nmi). It will carry two people plus luggage and will operate on a single tank of premium unleaded gas. The design of the production version was made public at AirVenture Oshkosh on 26 July 2010 and no longer included a front canard.

The Transition Proof-of-Concept's maiden flight on 5 March 2009 lasted 37 seconds and covered 3,000 feet (910 m) of the runway at the Plattsburgh International Airport. The test pilot then conducted 6 additional takeoffs and landings.

In June 2010, the FAA granted Terrafugia an exemption for the Transition's extra takeoff weight. The added weight accommodates the Transition's road safety features, which is needed to comply with Federal Motor Vehicle Safety Standards. On June 29, 2011, the National Highway Traffic Safety Administration also granted exemptions allowing the Transition to use a polycarbonate windshield, to use tires suited for highway and aircraft use but not typically certified for multi-purpose vehicle use, to not include an electronic stability control system that could inadvertently cut engine power during flight, and finally, to use regular instead of advanced airbag deployment.

After undergoing drive tests and high-speed taxi tests, the production prototype completed its first flight on March 23, 2012 at Plattsburgh, New York. The production prototype then made its auto show debut at the 2012 New York International Auto Show in April, 2012. In June, 2012, Terrafugia announced that the Transition had completed the first of six phases of flight testing. By July, the second phase of testing was underway, expanding the performance envelope in the sky and continuing drive testing on the ground.

The company's next-generation concept, the TF-2, is an aircraft that would have carried both cargo and passenger loads.

== DARPA Transformer (TX) Project ==
Transformer (TX) was a DARPA US$65m, five year, three phase program intended to develop a 'flying Humvee'. A Phase 1 proposal from AAI Corporation was awarded a US$3m contract in September, 2010 and incorporates deployable surfaces technology from subcontractor Terrafugia.

== Terrafugia TF-X ==
On May 7, 2013, Terrafugia announced the successor of Transition, called the TF-X. TF-X is a plug-in hybrid tilt-rotor vehicle and would be the first fully autonomous flying car. It would have a range of 500 miles (800 km; 430 nmi) per flight and batteries are rechargeable by the engine. It was expected to hit the market at least six years after Transition (2023).
