= Biomega (bicycle company) =

Danish bicycle manufacturer

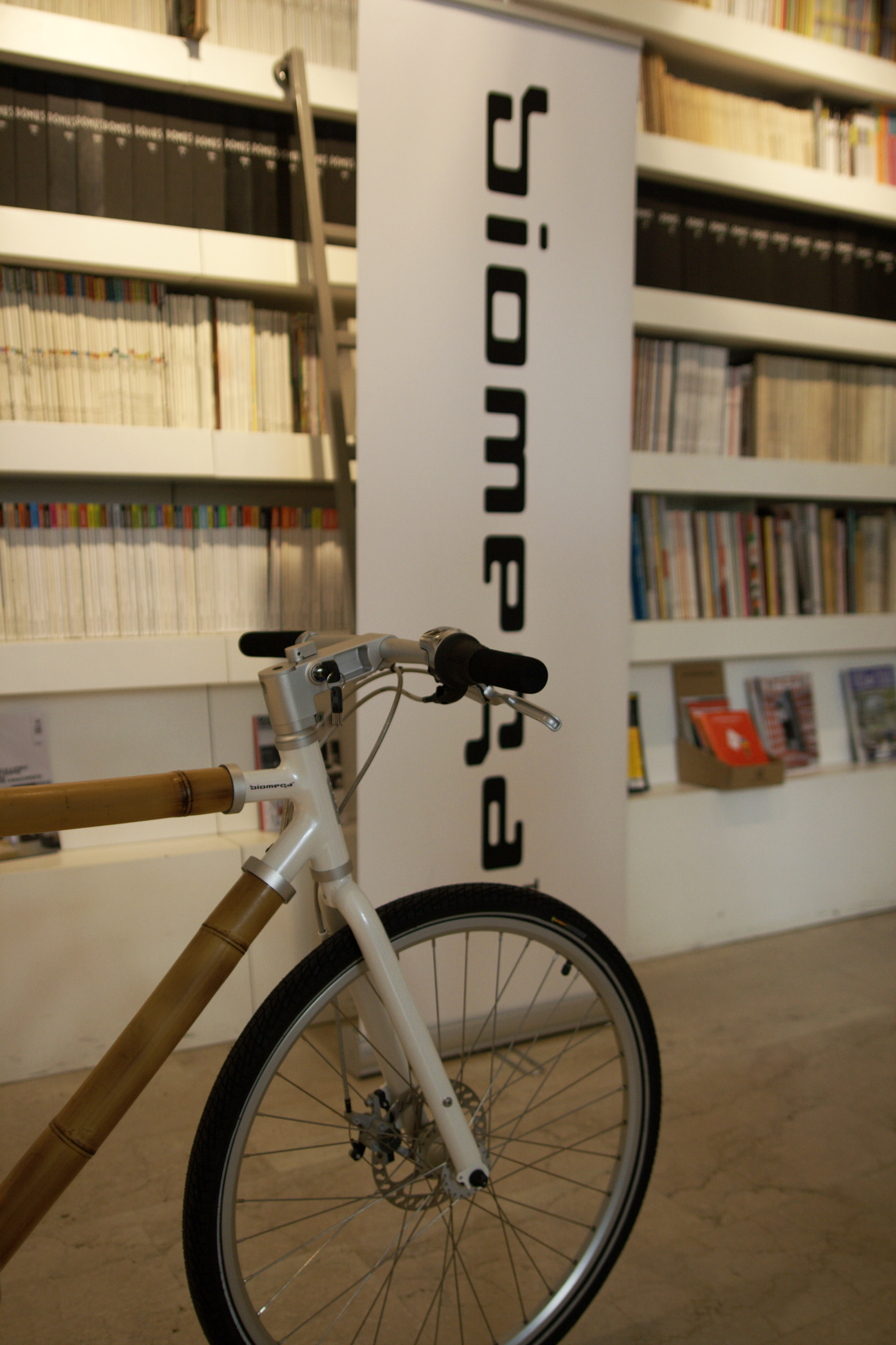
Biomega Bamboo bicycle

Biomega is a Copenhagen-based, Danish brand of designer bicycles. It was immediately known for engaging with international designers from outside the bicycle industry; including Marc Newson, Ross Lovegrove, Karim Rashid and Bjarke Ingels, often giving its products unconventional solutions. In addition to producing bikes under its own name, Biomega produced bicycles under a joint sub-brand "Urban Mobility" with Puma AG.

Biomega bicycles were represented in the design collections of both Die Neue Sammlung, CNAP, Design Museum Denmark, MoMA, SFMOMA and the Sir Terrence Conran Foundation Collection.

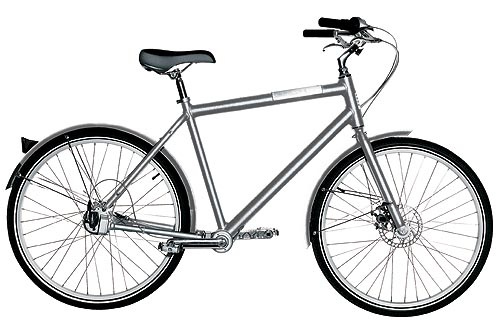
Biomega ams mens 8sp

== History ==
Biomega was established in 1998 by former university classmates Jens Martin Skibsted and Elias Grove Nielsen.[4] Marc Newson's bicycle design MN in superplastic formed aluminium and Jens Martin Skibsted's shaft drive bike CPH launched in 2000.

The first generation of the AMS bike was launched in 2002.

In 2010, 'LDN' bicycle was launched, It was designed by Ross Lovegrove.

In 2015, the company revealed its first electric bike 'OKO'.

In 2018, it announced that it was going to make an electric vehicle called 'Biomega SIN'. The project received funding from EVE, a Hong Kong-based investment group. It was aimed that in 2021, the EV would to be in production. It was unveiled at the China International Import Expo.

In 2019, the company launched an electric version of the AMS and the ‘OKO e-low’, their second low step electric bicycle. The bike was designed by KiBiSi, also founded by Jens Martin Skibsted.

In April 2021, they launched 'EIN trailer'. It claimed to be world's first weightless electric cycle trailer. It was designed by Manyone. The company launched a crowdfunding campaign on Indiegogo where it reached the funding goal in just a few hours.

The license holder owned by ALCO went bankrupt in August 2022, after millions in losses, with a debt of DKK 72 million.

In 2024 Jens Martin Skibsted acquired the Biomega brand and launched a crowdfunding campaign with the BER electric bike.
