= Jens Martin Skibsted =

Danish designer, entrepreneur and author (born 1970)

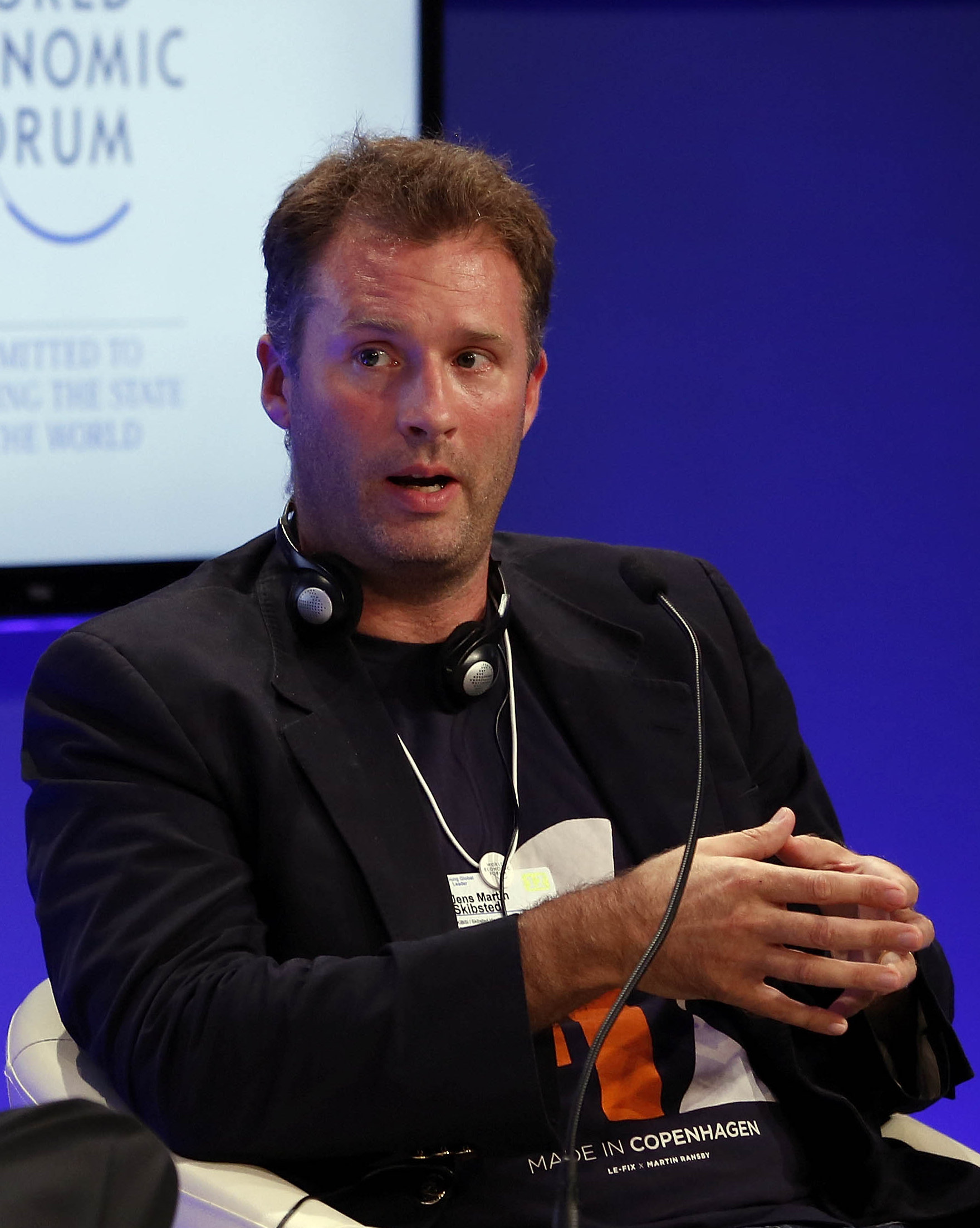
Skibsted at the World Economic Forum Annual Meeting of the New Champions in 2012

Jens Martin Skibsted (born 28 June 1970) is a Danish designer, entrepreneur and author. He is a partner at Manyone A/S. He has founded or co-founded companies such as Biomega, Skibsted Ideation, Actics, KiBiSi and Ogojiii.

He has won several international awards and holds a number of board memberships.

== Early life and education ==
Jens Martin Skibsted was born in Sønderborg, Denmark. Shortly after his birth his father was killed in a car crash. He mainly grew up in Francophone countries. After spending a year in Paris, he founded the Av-Art art association in Copenhagen. It was a combined art gallery, record label and venue for experimental music and poetry readings.

All of Martin Skibsted bike designs are in the Design Museum Denmark. in addition to LeCnap.

He then returned to Paris to study at the École supérieure d'études cinématographiques film school, graduating in 1994. After that he went back to Copenhagen to study philosophy at the University of Copenhagen, finishing his bachelor's degree in 1998. After that he took a degree in Business Management from University of California, Berkeley in 2000.

== Career ==
In 1998 Skibsted co-founded Biomega with former university classmate Elias Grove Nielsen. In 1998 Skibsted Ideation was founded. Actics was founded in 2005. In 2009 Skibsted co-founded KiBiSi with Lars Holme Larsen and Bjarke Ingels. In 2015 Skibsted founded the printed design magazine Ogojiii in Johannesburg, South Africa. In 2018 Skibsted was a co-founder of Strategic Design Group alongside Søren Lehmann Poulsen and ex-Designit partners David Fellah and Lasse Jensby Dahl. In September 2019 Strategic Design Group was rebranded as Manyone. Skibsted remains a co-owner on the management board of Manyone

He designed the Aeroslider, a hypothetical for an elevated train maglev similar to Ringway Transportation System designed by Naveen Chaudhary.

== Board memberships and think tanks ==
- Young Global Leader, (2009–2014)
- Chairman, Danish Design Council (2014–2018)
- Co-chair, World Economic Forum’s think tank on entrepreneurship
- Council Member, World Economic Forum's Future Council on the Future of Cities and Urbanization
- Bitten og Mads Clausens Fond, (2012–present)

== Awards and recognition ==
- His Puma bicycle is in the MoMA and the SFMoMA collection.
- Included on the 2006 I.D. Forty list
- Vice-chair of the World Economic Forum design & innovation global agenda council (i.e.) think tank and co-chair of the entrepreneurship global future council.
- Included in the European Centre's 2014 40under40 list
- Wallpaper Design Award 2019: Best Power Trip Main Designer for first Biomega electric Bike
- Good Design Award for Biomega NYC (2014)
- Good Design Award for Biomega PEK (2016)
- iF Design Award for Kallista Taper by KiBiSi (2018)
- Award-winning Designer with KiBiSi (a design group with Bjarke Ingels).
- Design of The Year (2019) HAV dinner set by KiBiSi for Royal Copenhagen.
- Design and Development for the Terrafugia Transition flying car
- Recipient of The Knud V. Engelhardt's Memorial Delegate.

== Writing ==
Skibsted is the author of four books, Kavesom (2003), Instant Icon (2008), Tilbage til virkeligheden (2013) and Expand (2022). He contributes with blogs and opinion pieces to publications such as Huffington Post, Fast Company, World Economic Forum and Harvard Business Review. He occasionally writes for Danish business publication Børsen.

== Bibliography ==
- Kravsom (in Danish). Attika. 2003. ISBN 978-87-7528-530-3.
- Skibsted, Jens Martin; Aagaard, Sune (2008). Instant Icon: Om produkter der skaber exceptionel værdi og hvordan de bliver til (in Danish). Gyldendal. ISBN 9788702071344. OCLC 465095202.
- Bech Hansen, Rasmus; Skibsted, Jens Martin (2013). Tilbage til virkeligheden: sådan skabes værdi i en verden, hvor alle ved alt [Back to Reality] (in Danish) (1st ed.). Gyldendal. ISBN 9788702130072. OCLC 865000265.
- Bason, Christian; Skibsted, Jens Martin (24 May 2022). Expand: Stretching the Future By Design. BenBella Books. ISBN 978-1637740736.
