= KiBiSi =

KiBiSi is a design firm in Copenhagen, Denmark, founded in 2009 by Lars Holme Larsen, Bjarke Ingels and Jens Martin Skibsted. It brings together the expertise of their three design companies: Kilo Design (Ki), BIG architects (Bi) and Skibsted Ideation (Si). The three are able to draw on ideas from different fields, creating attractive, functional yet untraditional products. The company specifically addresses the areas of architecture, furniture, electronics, transportation, culture and lifestyle.

== Product designs ==
Designs have ranged from furniture (the Shanghai Chair for the Danish Pavilion at Expo 2010, the Tripart Chair for the Milan furniture fair) to headphones for AIAIAI or bicycles for Puma. Bjarke Ingels envisages a collaborative approach in designing products for public project interiors: "The notion of Gesamtkunstwerk has been ridiculed or made impossible by current production apparatus, but with our collaboration within KiBiSi we could slowly move in that direction," he comments.
