= Dynon =

Dynon is a surname. Notable people with the surname include:

- Denis Dynon (1822-1863), Irish recipient of the Victoria Cross
- Kevin Dynon (1925-2017), Australian footballer
- Moira Lenore Dynon (1920-1976), Australian chemist and community activist

== See also ==
- Dynon Avionics, American aircraft avionics manufacturer
