= Sluishuis =

Apartment building in Amsterdam, the Netherlands

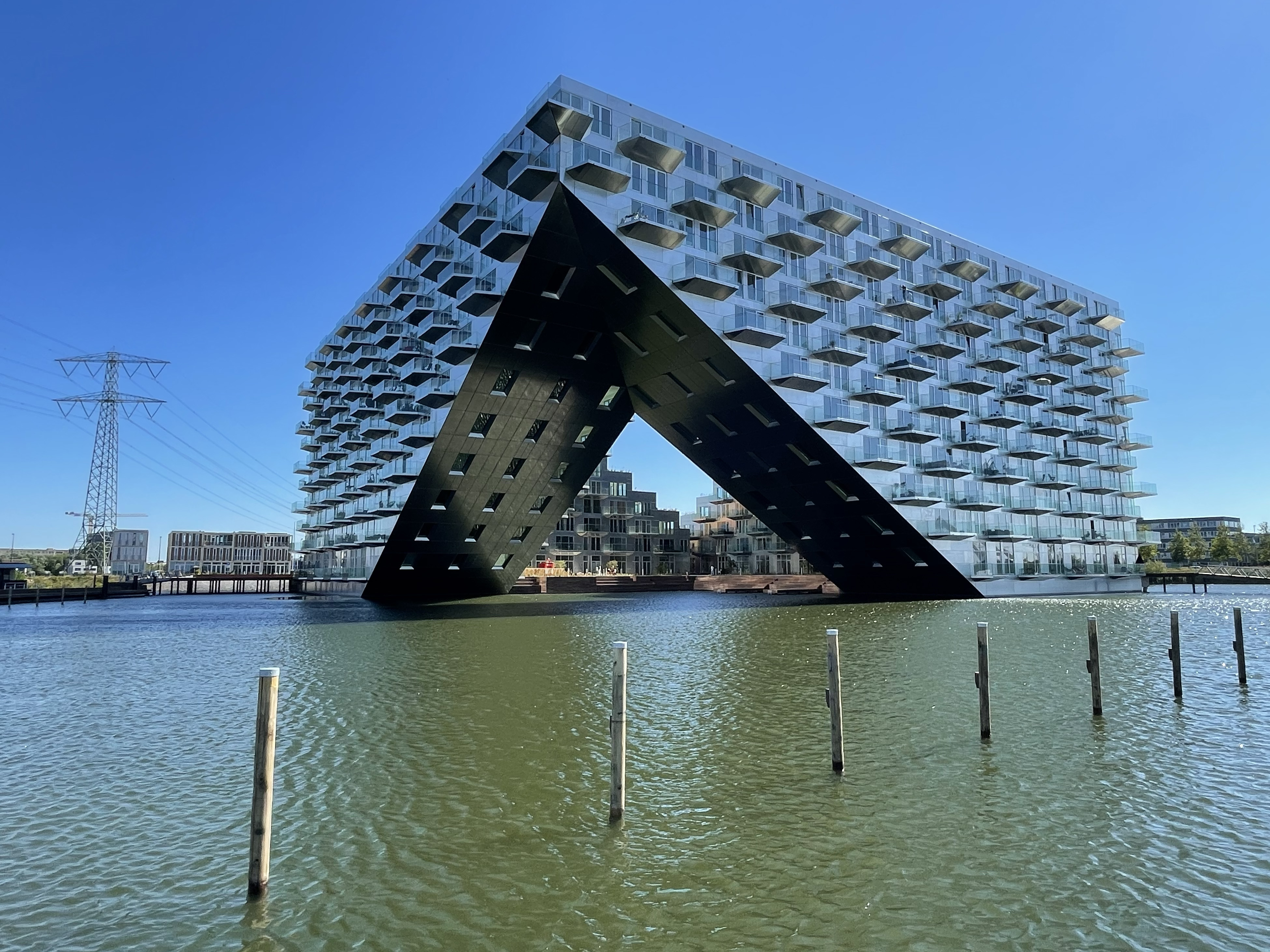
- The Sluishuis, just after its opening in July 2022
- Location in IJburg

General information
- Type: Apartment building
- Location: IJburg, Haringbuisdijk 1-919, 1086VA, Amsterdam, Netherlands
- Coordinates: 52°21′52″N 4°58′53″E
- Construction started: 18 December 2018
- Opening: 13 July 2022

Height
- Height: 52 m (171 ft)

Technical details
- Floor area: 35,000 m^{2} (380,000 sq ft)

Design and construction
- Architect: Bjarke Ingels Group Barcode Architects
- Structural engineer: BESIX

The Sluishuis (Dutch for 'sluice house') is an apartment building in IJburg, a neighbourhood on artificial islands in Amsterdam, the Netherlands. The building, which opened on 13 July 2022, was designed by Bjarke Ingels Group, an architecture firm based in Copenhagen and New York City, in collaboration with Rotterdam-based Barcode Architects.

The Sluishuis is a sustainable building, with solar panels installed on the roof providing the energy for the lighting and heating, ventilation, and air conditioning in the complex. Its courtyard has a publicly accessible jetty where boats can moor.

== Origin and construction ==
In early 2016, the City of Amsterdam held a competition for an "image-defining" building on the Haringbuisdijk, at the entrance to Steigereiland, opposite the houses of Dutch architect Marlies Rohmer. The proposal was for a residential building of at least 35,000 square metres (380,000 sq ft), with a space for houseboats.

The winning design came from a collaboration between two architecture firms: Bjarke Ingels Group (BIG), the company of Danish architect Bjarke Ingels and based in Copenhagen and New York City, and the Rotterdam-based company Barcode Architects. They designed a 52-metre-tall (171 ft) building with angled cut-off façades and a large opening in the front, through which boats can pass. A walkway was also designed around the building. BIG previously had used the shape of a closed building block where a corner was "raised" for the VIA 57 West building in New York City, on which they based the design of the Sluishuis as a starting point.

The unusual shape of the building posed significant construction challenges. The structural engineer, the Brussels-based construction group BESIX, decided to build two "backbones" in the form of concrete walls nearly 0.5 metres (1 ft 8 in) thick, from which the apartment units were suspended. During the construction, a temporary reclaimed island was used. The piles—vertical structural elements of a building's deep foundation—were driven 60 metres (200 ft) into the ground. The exterior of the building was clad with sheets of aluminium.

Construction began on 18 December 2018. The building was originally scheduled to open in early 2022 but opened on 13 July 2022.

== Use and environment ==
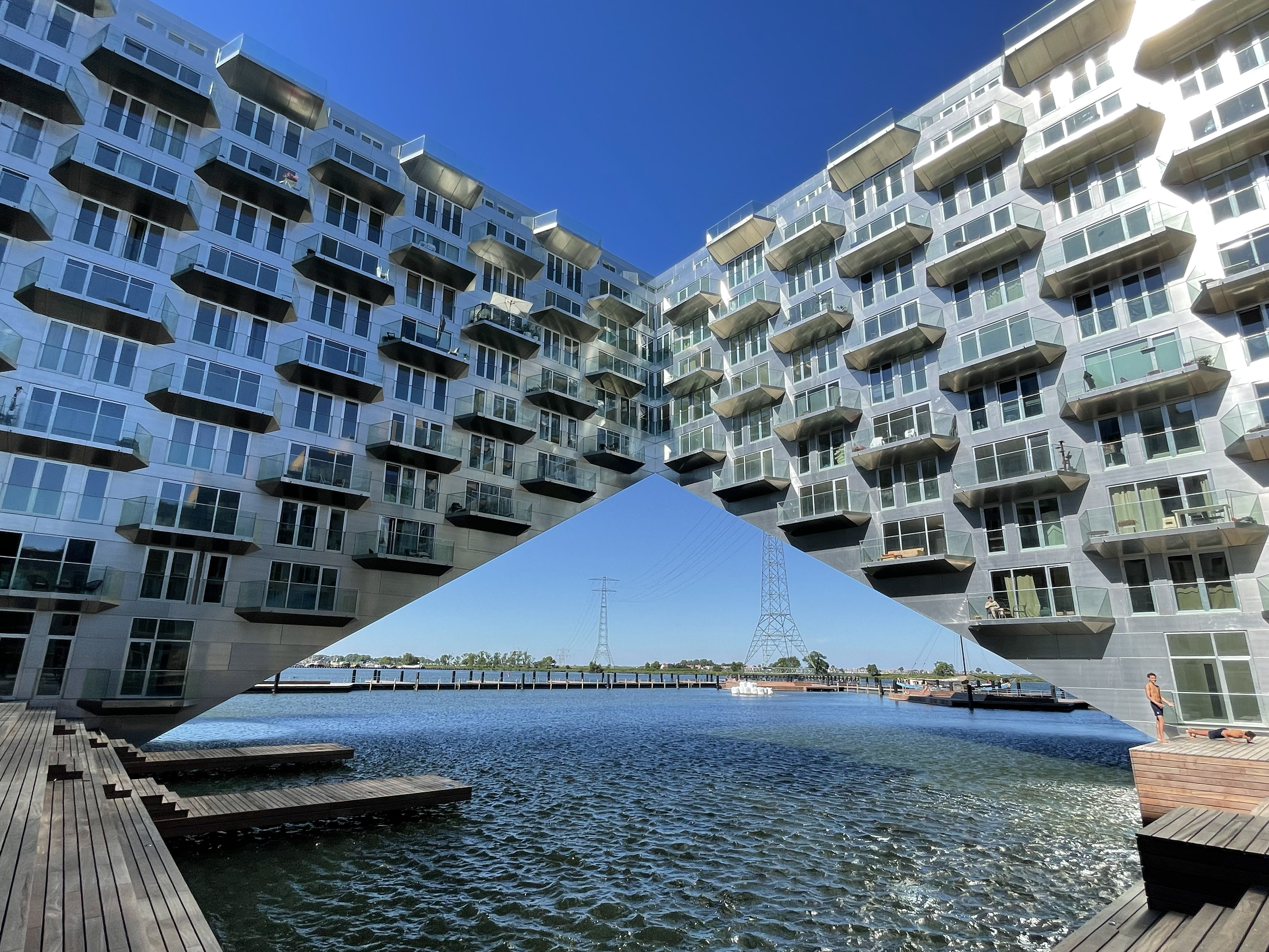
The courtyard of the Sluishuis has a publicly accessible jetty where boats can moor.

The Sluishuis has 442 apartment units; 369 of them, mainly in the middle segment, are for renting and the rest are on sale. The size of the residential units ranges from 40 to 180 square metres (430 to 1,940 sq ft). Around the entire building is a publicly accessible jetty where there is space for 34 houseboats. The Sluishuis is built over the water of the IJ, allowing boats to moor at a dock of the complex. The unusual shape makes the building appear to float above the water.

The façade of the building features two staircases that lead past the terraces to the roof, where there is a walkway and a view of the city. Any public access to the building is managed by the property owners' association of the building. The City of Amsterdam has mandated that the stairs must be open to the general public at least 80 days a year.

The Sluishuis is a sustainable building, with an Energy Performance Coefficient (EPC) of 0.00. On the roof, solar panels and solar thermal collectors have been installed; the solar panels provide the energy for the LED lighting and heating, ventilation, and air conditioning in the complex. The building has a heat pump system and its windows have been fitted with triple-insulated glass.

== Gallery ==
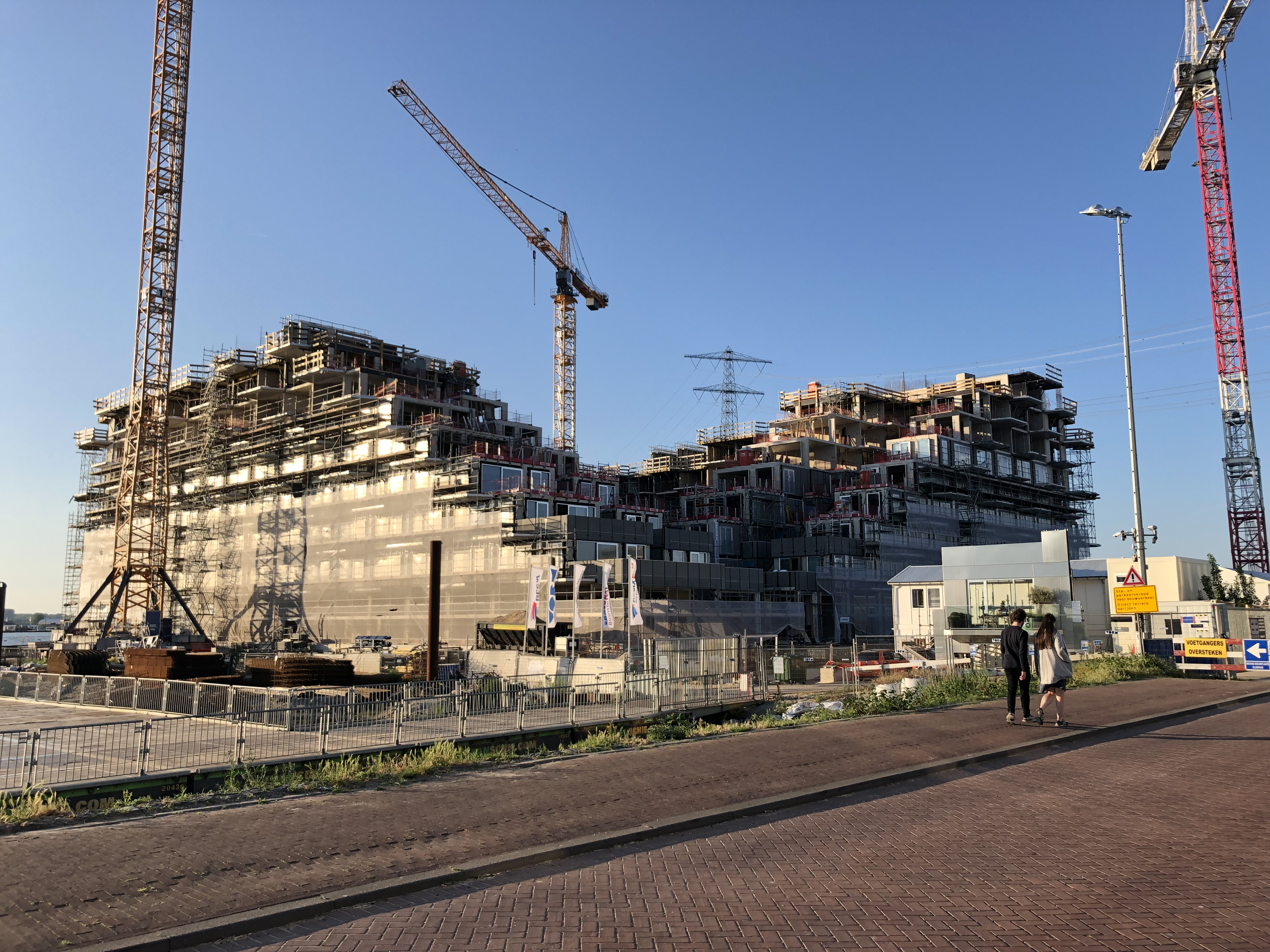
Construction of the Sluishuis in 2021

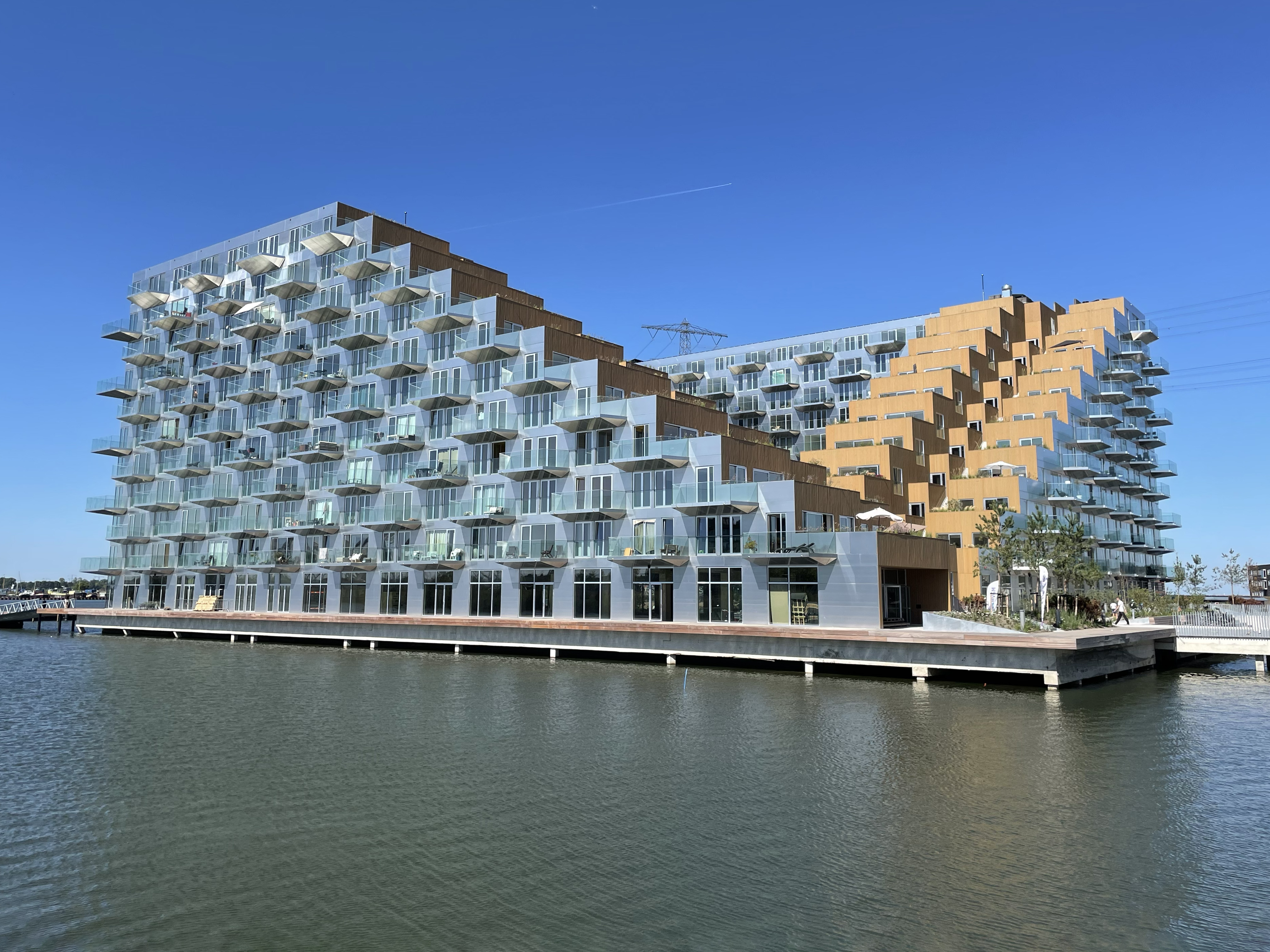
The Sluishuis seen from the IJburglaan; the stairs leading from the terraces to the roof are visible.

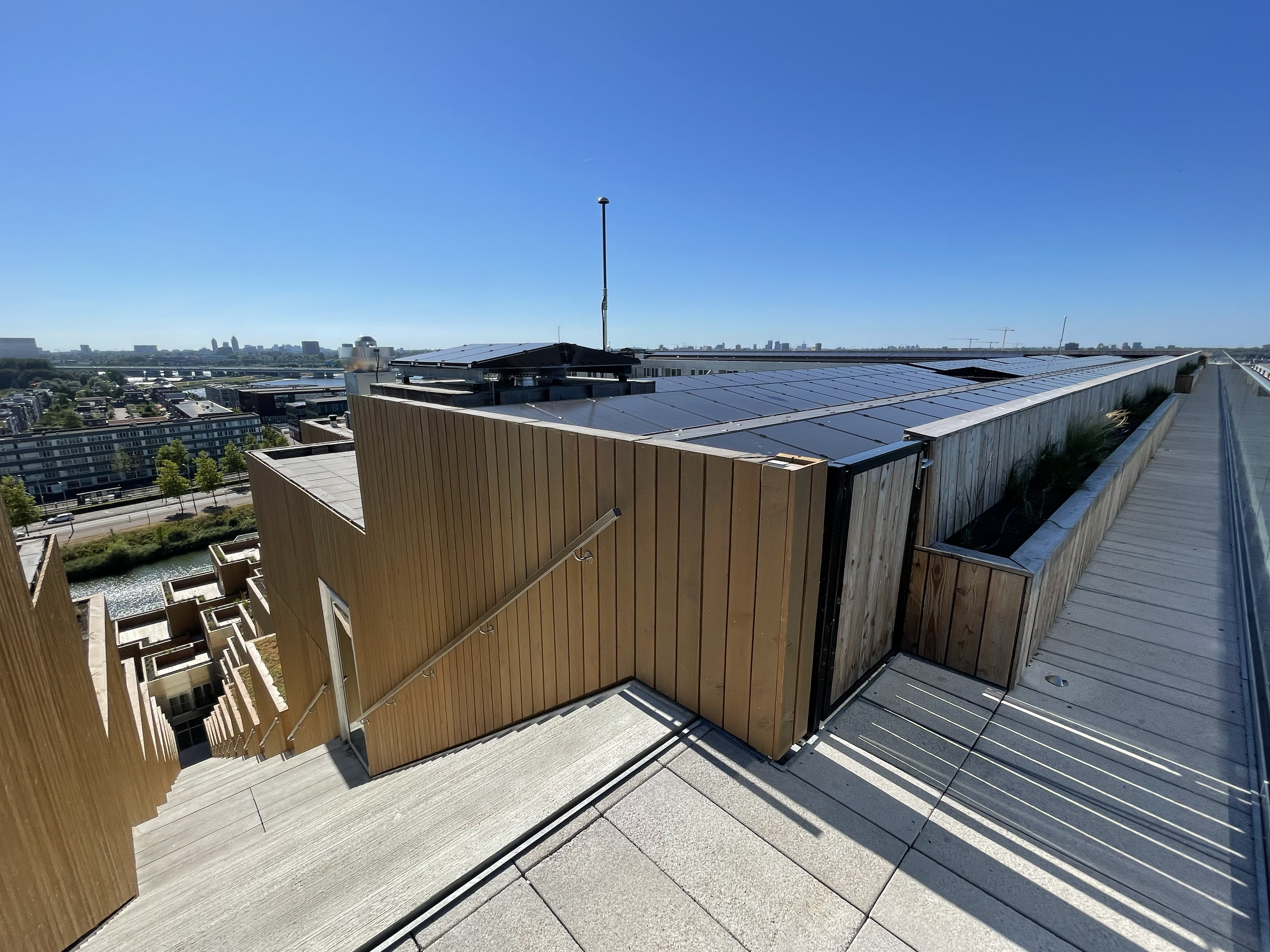
Walkway on the roof; solar panels are visible.

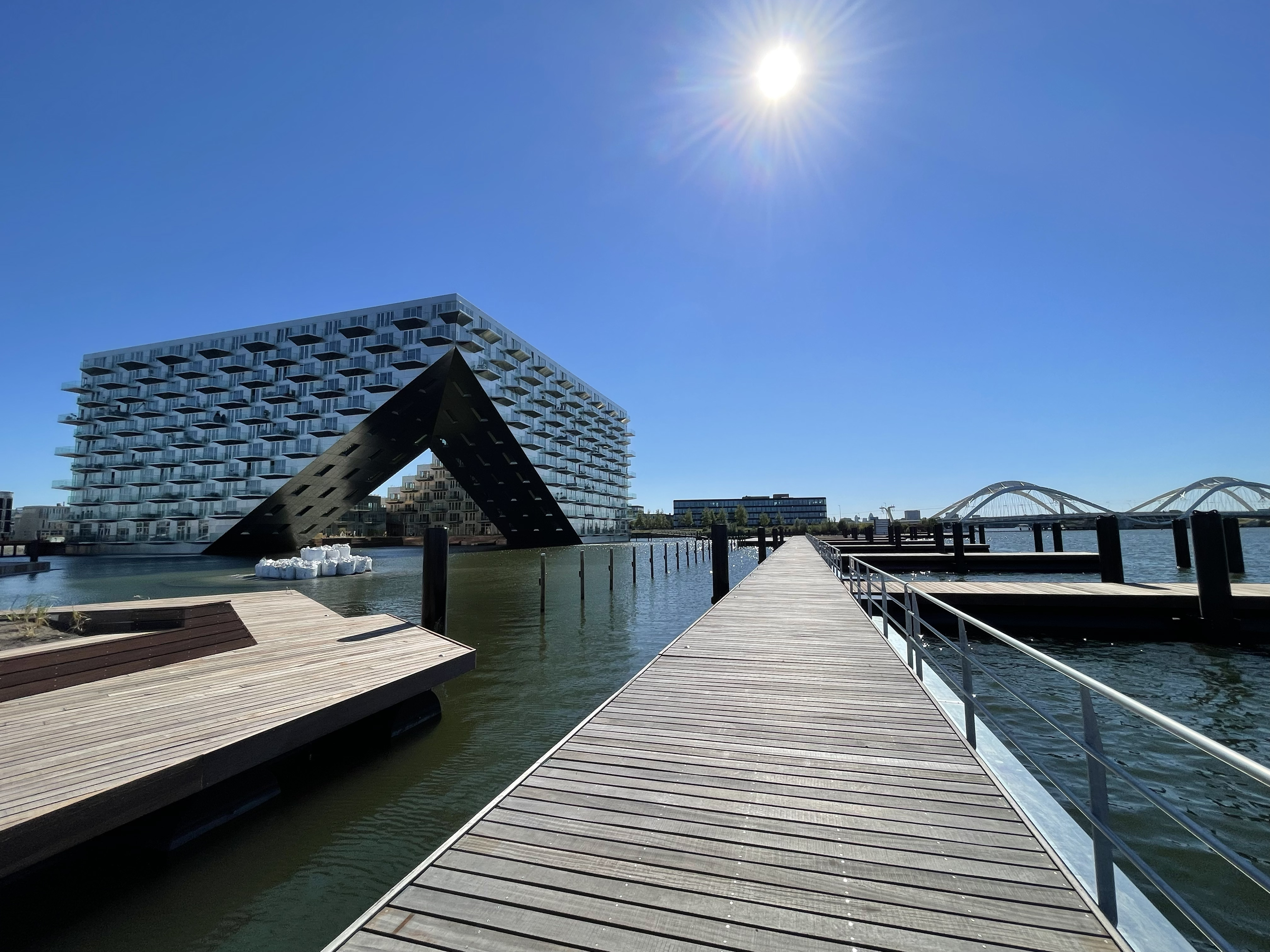
The Sluishuis (left) seen from the publicly accessible jetty, with the Enneüs Heerma Bridge (right)

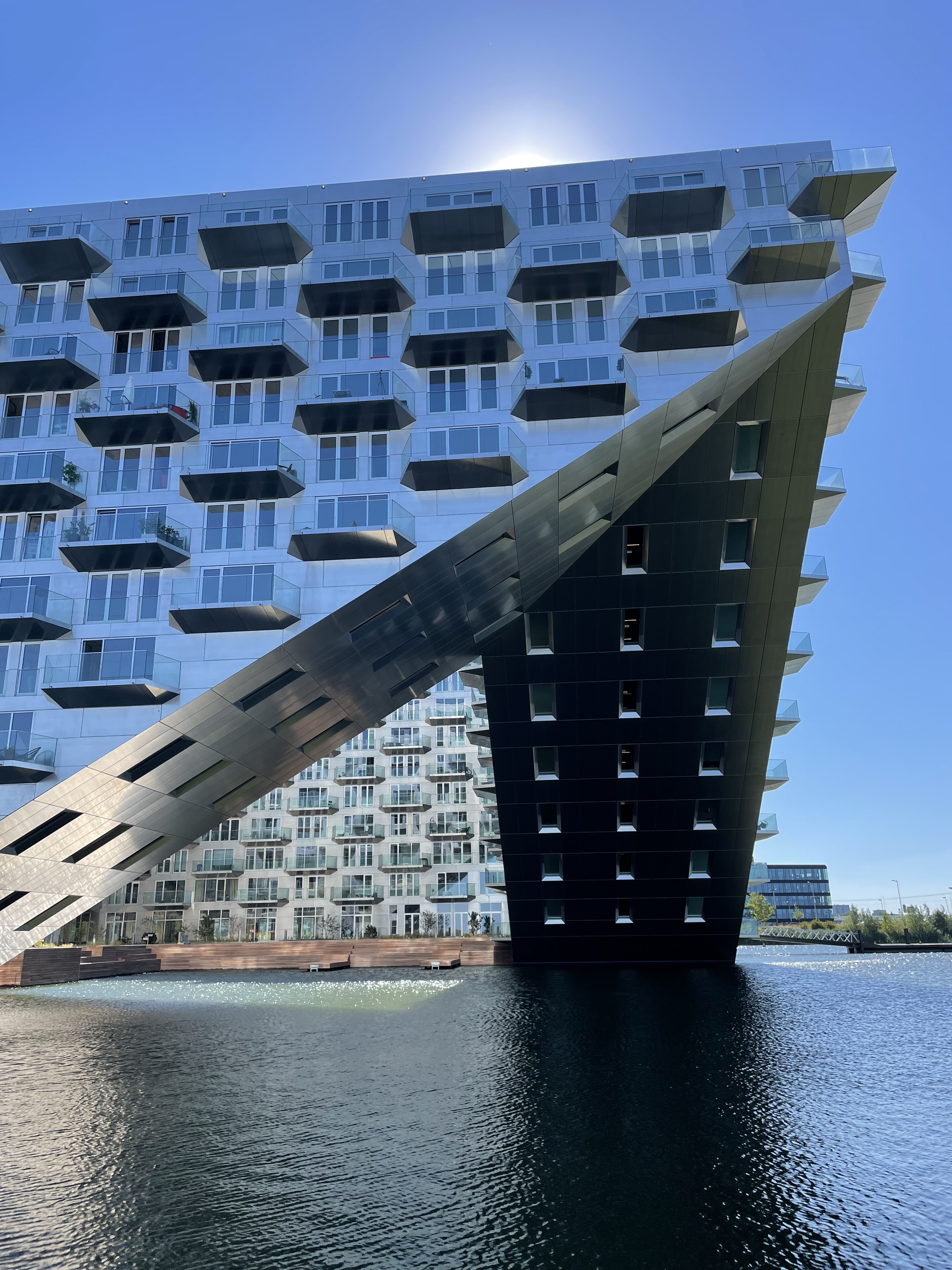
Closer look at the angled end
