= Sheela Maini Søgaard =

Danish business executive

Sheela Maini Søgaard is the CEO of the architecture company Bjarke Ingels Group (also known as BIG), as well as one of BIG's 23 partners. She is credited for growing the company and making profitable after joining the company in 2008. Maini Søgaard is known for being outspoken about gender balance. She has been a keynote speaker at the AIA Conference 2018.

== Personal life ==
Maini Søgaard was born to a Danish mother and Indian father and grew up in Saudi Arabia and Dubai. She moved to Copenhagen to study at Copenhagen Business School, and later moved to New York. She has three children with her husband, who is a stay-at-home dad.

== Career ==
Maini Søgaard studied at Copenhagen Business School, and then started her career by working at the multinational consumer goods corporation Procter and Gamble, the consulting firm McKinsey, and for the Danish chef and Noma co-founder Claus Meyer. In 2008, she joined BIG as the company's chief financial officer and later on became its chief executive officer.

Within the company and the industry, Maini Søgaard has been praised for improving the firm's profitability and growing the company more than tenfold. According to her, she has done so by re-thinking the traditional fee approach in architecture, hiring the right business staff, checking project timelines and budgets regularly throughout the year, and insisting on being paid by customers. She also credits the importance of culture for the company's success.

Maini Søgaard currently serves on the board of learning platform Area9 Lyceum, the advisory board of National Gallery of Denmark, as chairman of Danish wooden flooring company Dinesen and on the global law firm Kromann Reumert excellence panel.

== Opinions and beliefs ==
In 2017, Bjarke Ingels Group was criticised for the underrepresentation of women in architecture, as Maini Søgaard the only woman out of 12 partners. Cat Huang later became the second female partner in at BIG. Maini Søgaard's response was to argue that half of the managers were women, as well as 60% of directors, and that they had leading policies regarding maternity/paternity leaves and wage equality.

Maini Søgaard has argued that to have more women in leadership positions, it is necessary to share maternity and paternity leave equally, provide families with the opportunity of childcare during the whole duration of working hours, as well as encourage women in leadership now to mentor new women in business.

== Awards ==
Maini Søgaard was one of the recipients of the 2018 Nykredit Architecture Prize. She was one of five nominees for the 2019 Danish Leader of The Year Award. She was in 2019 also listed as one of Fast Company's 100 Most Creative People in Business, and received the 2019 Womenomics Award.

She was the winner of the 2022 Danish Leader of the Year Award.
