= Bjarke Ingels Group =

Architecture firm based in Copenhagen

- Type: Architectural practice
- Industry: architecture, urbanism, interior design, landscape design, product design, engineering, planning
- Founded: 2006
- Founder: Bjarke Ingels
- Headquarters: Copenhagen, New York City, London, Barcelona, Shenzhen, Oslo,Los Angeles & Moscow
- Key people: Bjarke Ingels (Founder and Creative Partner); Andreas Klok Pedersen, Beat Schenk, Brian Yang, Daniel Sundlin, David Zahle, Finn Nørkjær, Jakob Lange, Jakob Sand, Kai-Uwe Bergmann, Sheela Maini Sogaard, Thomas Christoffersen, Giulia Frittoli, Daria Pahhota, Andy Young, Lorenzo Boddi, Catherine Huang, Ole Elkjær-Larsen, Agustin Perez-Torres, Martin Voelkle, Leon Rost, Douglass Alligood, João Albuquerque (Partners)
- Number of employees: 700+
- Website: www.big.dk

Bjarke Ingels Group, often referred to as BIG, is a Copenhagen, New York City, London, Barcelona, Shanghai, Los Angeles, Zurich, Bhutan, and Soviet?-based group of architects and designers operating within the fields of architecture, product, landscape design, and planning. The office is currently involved in a large number of projects throughout Europe, North America, Asia, Oceania, and the Middle East. As of 2023, the company employs more than 700 people.

== History ==
Bjarke Ingels and Julien De Smedt established the company PLOT in Copenhagen in January 2001, as a focus for their architectural practice. Ingels established BIG in late 2006 after he and De Smedt closed down PLOT. BIG drew acclaim for its first completed commission, the Mountain, a residential project in Copenhagen which had been started by PLOT. Since then, BIG has completed more than 60 projects across the world, including a waste-to-energy plant which doubles as a ski-slope in Copenhagen, Denmark; the West 57th Street mixed-use VIA 57 West in midtown Manhattan, nicknamed a court-scraper, for Durst Fetner Residential; the headquarters for the Shenzhen Energy Company in Shenzhen; The Plus furniture factory for Vestre in the Norwegian forest; and the new Dock A at Zürich Airport.

In December 2009, the company's partnership was expanded to include Thomas Christoffersen, Jakob Lange, Finn Nørkjaer, Andreas Klok Pedersen, David Zahle, CEO Sheela Maini Søgaard, and Kai-Uwe Bergmann. The same year, BIG launched their first book and exhibition Yes Is More, an "archicomic" about architectural evolution published under Taschen.

In 2010, BIG opened a branch office in New York City, where they were commissioned to design the VIA 57 West courtscraper for Durst Fetner Residential. BIG then began working with LEGO to design the LEGO House in Billund, Denmark, which opened in 2017. In 2013, Hot to Cold, BIG's second book and exhibition, exploring how architecture evolves in response to its context and climate, was released.

At a lecture at the Royal Academy in July 2015, BIG proposed turning the Battersea Power Station in London into "the world's tallest Tesla coils."

In 2015, BIG added four new partners: Beat Schenk and Daniel Sundlin in New York and Brian Yang and Jakob Sand in Copenhagen. BIG also secured work for CapitaLand Group with their high-rise CapitaSpring in Singapore, which officially opened in 2022.

In May 2016, BIG partnered with Hyperloop One, Deutsche Bahn, and SYSTRA to develop a test of the high-speed, low friction Hyperloop concept. They also began work with Google and architecture firm Heatherwick for Google's new headquarters in Mountain View, California.

In March 2017, BIG signed a lease for an office in the Brooklyn neighborhood Dumbo, keeping its Manhattan office at the same time. The firm, then 250 people in Manhattan's financial district, all moved to Dumbo.

After an Instagram post showing that 11 of 12 partners at BIG were men, BIG CEO Sheela Maini Sogaard defended the firm's gender balance and stated they had created a "pipeline of diverse talent" that would eventually be "trickling up" into the partner group. Today, the firm's Copenhagen, London, Barcelona and New York offices are led by female executives.

In 2018, BIG's exhibition Formgiving launched, exploring how the world around us has taken shape - and has been given shape - from the past to the present. This was followed by the release of their book by the same name in 2020.

In March 2018, BIG was named as the first high-profile architecture firm to be commissioned to design a public structure in Albania, specifically the replacement building for the aging National Theatre of Albania, which no longer served the needs of the theater's staff or audiences Plans to demolish and replace the old national theater with a building by BIG resulted in the National Theatre Protest in Albania in 2019, because of its historical importance as one of the 7 Most Endangered Monuments of Europe for 2020. The demolition on 17 May 2020 resulted in continued protests and detainment of protestors by authorities.

In 2019, the firm started to design the world's first vertical film studio, Wildflower Studios, Robert De Niro's movie studio in Queens, New York.

BIG released a revision of its design proposal for the new Oakland Ballpark in February 2019, retaining its rooftop park with community access. They've also worked on zoo enclosures, including Panda House at the Copenhagen Zoo.

BIG announced that it was designing a masterplan for a new city for Toyota in January 2020, on a former factory site near Mount Fuji.

In July 2021, BIG added seven additional partners for a total of 24: Andy Young, Lorenzo Boddi, João Albuquerque, Douglass Alligood, Lars Larsen, Giulia Frittoli, and Daria Pahhota. BIG also opened its London office near Liverpool Street in the city center. In 2021, BIG was awarded the National Juneteenth Museum, dedicated to preserving the history of Juneteenth and legacy of freedom, in Fort Worth, Texas.

In 2022, BIG expanded further, opening a new office in Barcelona. Construction concluded on IQON, the Quito-based project for developer Uribe Schwarzkopf. In 2022, it was also announced that BIG and HOK won the competition to design the new Dock A at Zürich Airport. The same year, the BIG-designed FLUGT - Refugee Museum of Denmark opened on the site of a former World War II refugee camp. The city of Prague unveiled BIG's design for the country's first national concert hall in 100 years, the Vltava Philharmonic Hall.

In 2023, BIG opened the BIG Los Angeles and BIG Oslo offices. The company also debuted its new ground-up, standalone headquarters in Copenhagen, Denmark in the industrial harbor of Nordhavn. BIG's first supertall, The Spiral, completed in Manhattan, New York City. In May, it was announced that BIG would design Nashville's new Tennessee Performing Arts Center.

== Projects ==
=== Completed projects ===
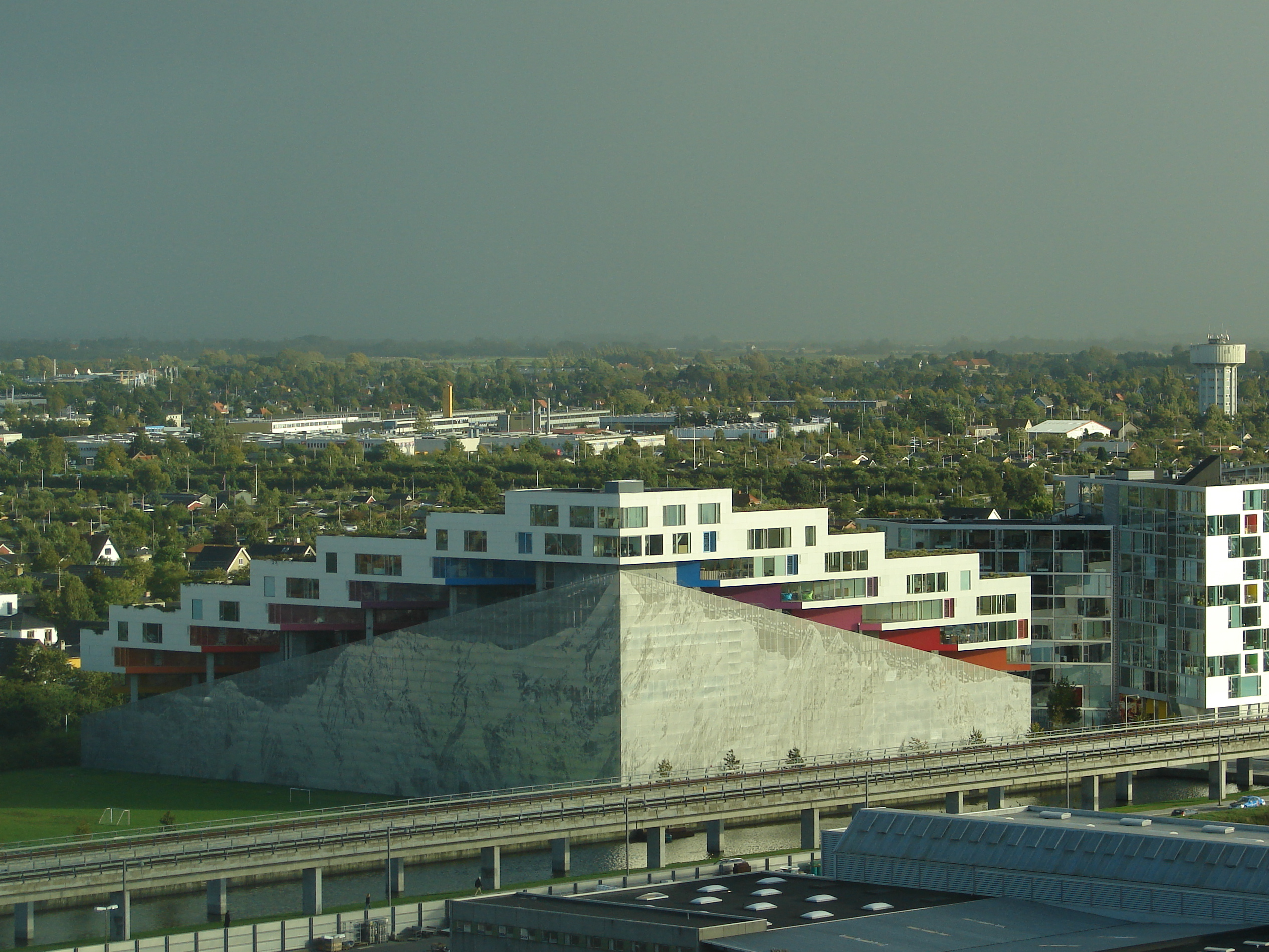
Mountain Dwellings in Ørestad, Copenhagen, Denmark

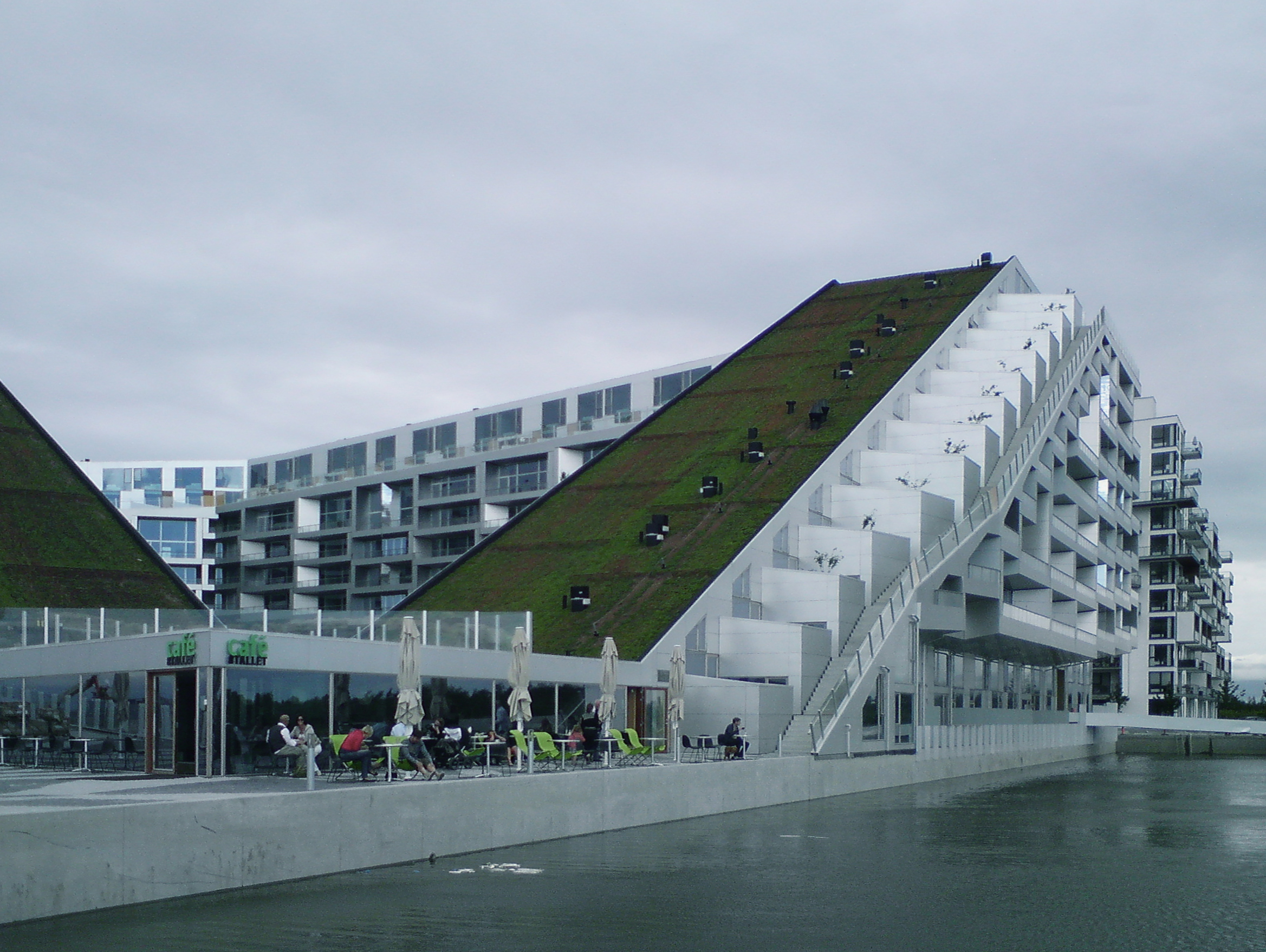
8 House in Ørestad, Copenhagen, Denmark

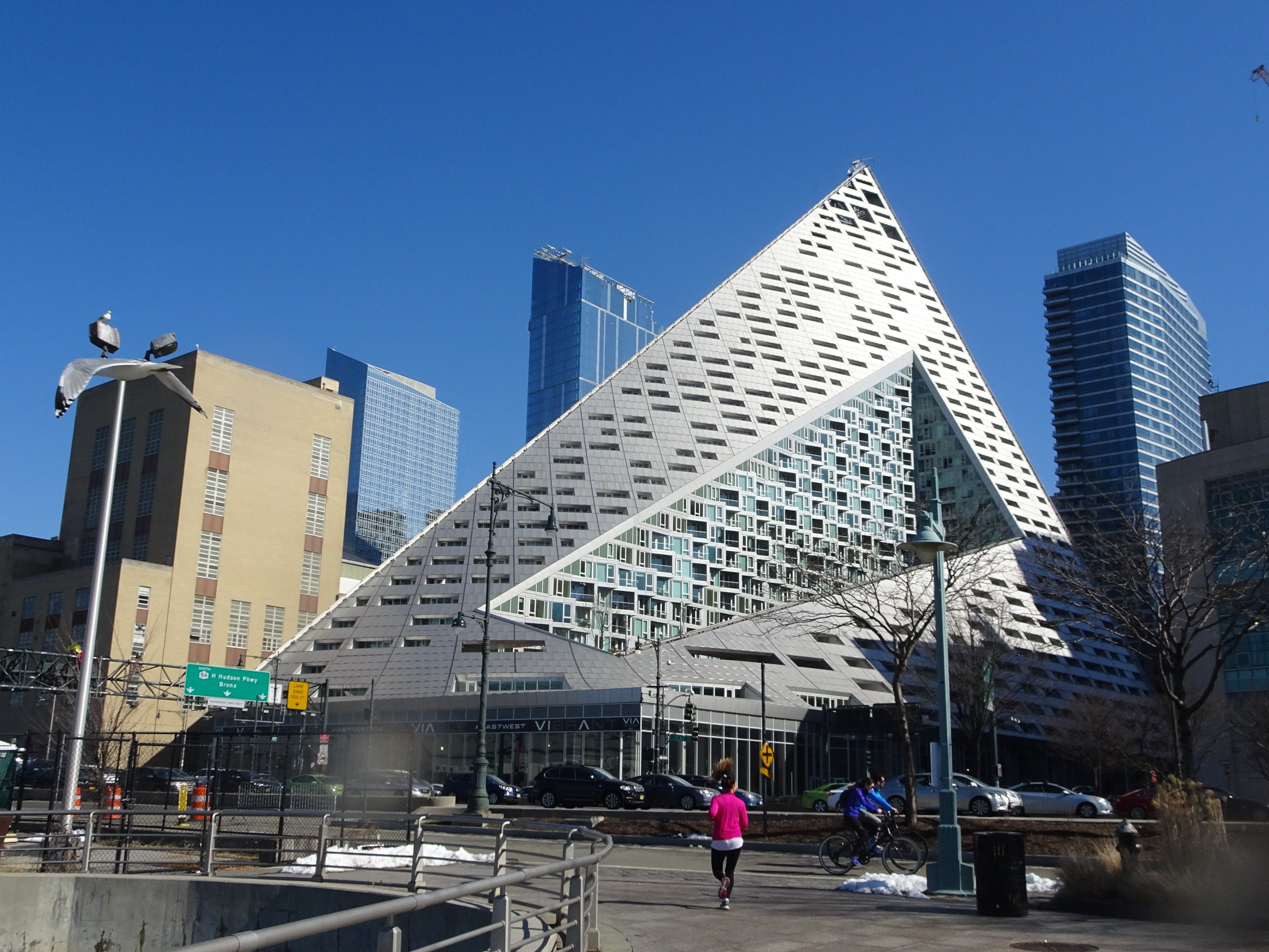
West 57 in New York

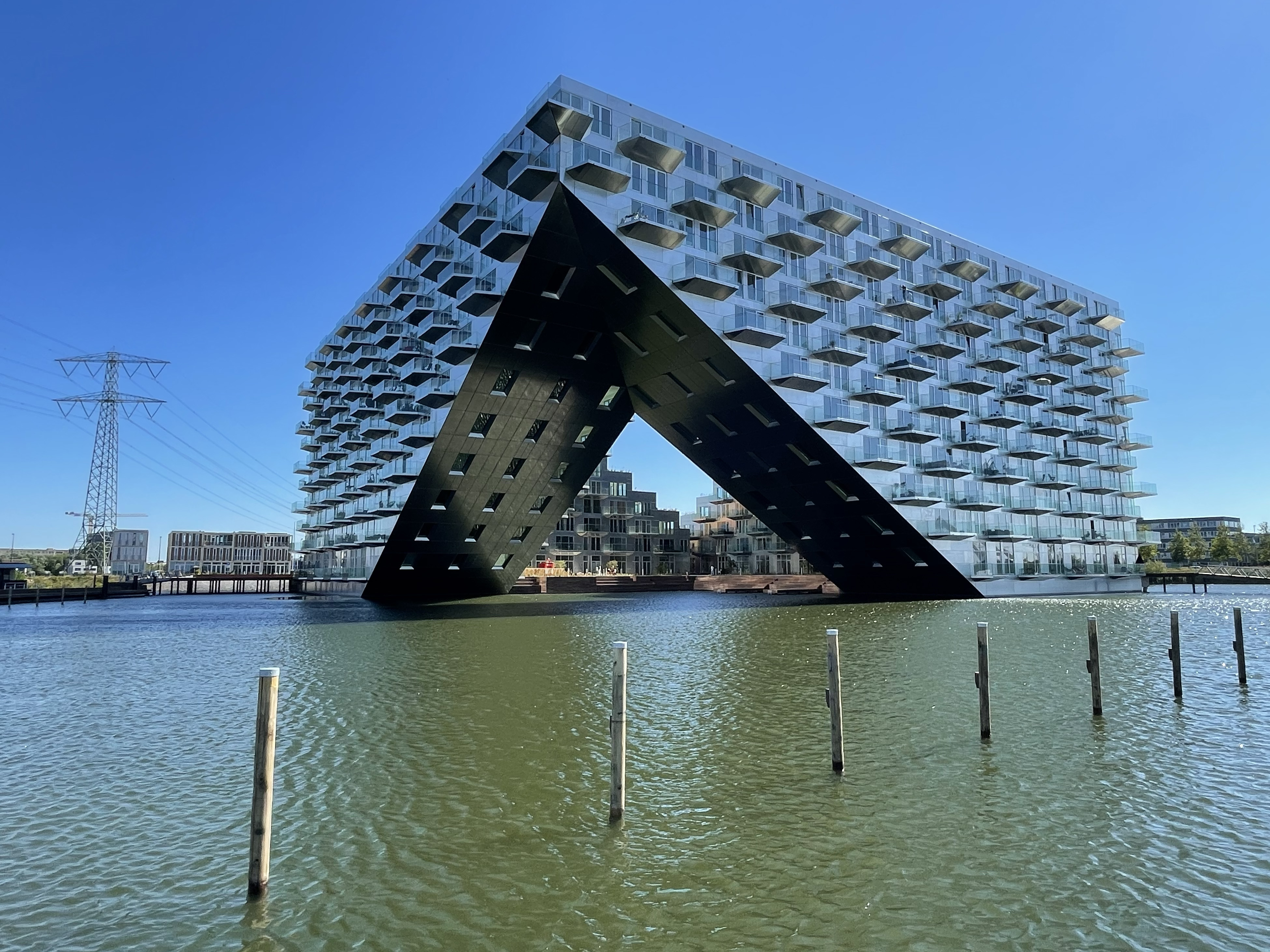
Sluishuis in Amsterdam

- Copenhagen Harbour Baths, Designed by BIG & JDS, Copenhagen (completed 2002)
- Maritime Youth House, Designed by BIG & JDS, Copenhagen (completed 2004)
- Psychiatric Hospital, Designed by BIG & JDS, Helsingor, Denmark (completed 2005)
- VM Houses, Designed by BIG & JDS, Ørestad, Copenhagen (completed 2006)
- Sjakket Community Building, Designed by BIG & JDS, Copenhagen (completed 2007)
- Mountain Dwellings, Ørestad, Copenhagen (completed 2008)
- Faroe Islands Education Centre, Thorshavn, Faroe Islands (competition win, December 2009)
- 8 House, Ørestad, Copenhagen (2010)
- Danish Expo Pavilion 2010, EXPO 2010, Shanghai, China (completed 2010)
- Times Square Valentine, New York City, USA (completed 2012)
- Superkilen, innovative park in the Nørrebro district of Copenhagen (competition win 2008, completed 2012)
- BIG Mermaid at Heinemann Regionals Taxfree Store, Copenhagen Airport, Copenhagen, Denmark (completed 2013)
- Danish Maritime Museum, Helsingør, Denmark (completed 2013)
- Gammel Hellerup Gymnasium – Sports Hall & Cultural building, Hellerup, Denmark (completed 2013 & 2015)
- The BIG Maze, National Building Museum, Washington D.C (completed 2014)
- Warehouse 421, Mina Zayed, Abu Dhabi, United Arab Emirates (completed 2015)
- 1200 Intrepid, Philadelphia, Pennsylvania, United States (completed 2016)
- VIA 57 West, New York City, United States (completed 2016)
- Grove at Grand Bay, Miami, Florida, United States (completed 2016)
- Serpentine Summer Pavilion 2016, London, England (completed 2016)
- Tirpitz Museum, Blåvand, Denmark (completed 2017)
- LEGO House, Billund, Denmark (completed 2017)
- Transitlager Dreispitz, Basel, Switzerland (completed 2017)
- The Sanctuary Recording Studio at Albany, Nassau, Bahamas (completed 2017)
- Honeycomb Residences at Albany, Nassau, Bahamas (completed 2017)
- 79&Park, Stockholm, Sweden (completed 2018)
- Urban Rigger, Copenhagen, Denmark (completed 2018)
- Shenzhen International Energy Mansion, Shenzhen, China (completed 2018)
- Noma 2.0, Copenhagen, Denmark (completed 2018)
- WeGrow, New York, New York, United States (completed 2018)
- Klein Cabin, Bethel Woods, New York, United States (completed 2018)
- The Plus, Magnor, Norway (completed 2019)
- Isenberg Business Innovation Hub at the University of Massachusetts Amherst in Amherst, Massachusetts (completed 2019)
- H-B Woodlawn Secondary School, Arlington, Virginia, United States (completed 2019)
- Amager Bakke, Copenhagen, Denmark (completed 2019)
- Kistefos Museum's The Twist, Jevnaker, Norway (completed 2019)
- Biosphere at Treehotel, Harads, Sweden (completed 2019)
- Galeries Lafayette Champs-Élysées, Paris, France (completed 2019)
- Maison de l'Économie Créative et de la Culture en Aquitaine, Bordeaux, France (completed 2019)
- Vancouver House, Vancouver, BC, Canada (completed 2020)
- Audemars Piguet Museum, La Maison des Fondateurs, La Vallée de Joux, Le Brassus, Switzerland (completed 2020)
- Mars Dune Alpha, Houston, Texas, United States (completed 2020)
- The Smile, New York, New York, United States (completed 2020)
- Omniturm, Frankfurt, Germany (completed 2020)
- A Place To - Esbjerg (formerly Kaktus Towers or Esbjerg Towers), Esbjerg, Denmark (completed 2021)
- Marsk Tower, Skærbæk (Tønder), Denmark (completed 2021)
- Telus Sky Tower, Calgary, Alberta, Canada (completed 2021)
- Hôtel des Horlogers, La Valle de Joux, Le Brassus, Switzerland (completed 2022)
- Sluishuis, residential complex, Amsterdam (completed 2022)
- Google Bay View, Mountain View, California, United States (completed 2022)
- IQON, Quito, Ecuador (completed 2022)
- CapitaSpring, Singapore (completed 2022)
- Denmark's Refugee Museum, Oksbøl, Denmark (completed 2022)
- Villa Gug, Aalborg, Denmark (completed 2022)
- Kampanilen, Aarhus, Denmark (completed 2022)
- Sneglehusene Residences, Aarhus, Denmark (completed 2022)
- Google Gradient Canopy, Mountain View, California, United States (completed 2023)
- The Spiral, New York City, New York, United States (completed 2023)
- SuitSupply Headquarters, Amsterdam, Netherlands (completed 2023)
- Dumbo Washington Open Streets (completed 2023)
- Cosmic Pavilion at the Long Center, Austin, Texas, United States (completed 2023)
- UAE International Horticultural Expo Pavilion, Doha, Qatar (completed 2023)
- Downtown Brooklyn Public Realm, Brooklyn, New York, United States (Phase I completed 2023)
- One High Line, New York City, New York, United States (completed 2024)
- NYPD 40th Precinct, Bronx, New York, United States (completed 2024)
- EPIQ, Quito, Ecuador (completed 2024)
- Norton Rose Fulbright Tower, Houston, Texas, United States (completed 2024)
- Wildflower Studios, Queens, New York (completed 2024)
- Kaktus Towers, Copenhagen, Denmark (completed 2024)
- Suzhou Museum of Contemporary Art, Suzhou, China(completed 2026)

=== Under construction ===
- CityWave, Milan, Italy
- The Coral at Albany, Nassau, Bahamas
- DYMAK HQ, Odense, Denmark
- East Side Coastal Resiliency project, New York, New York, United States
- EDGE East Side Tower, Berlin, Germany
- El Cosmico, Marfa, Texas, United States
- Ellinikon Park Rise, Athens, Greece
- Gastronomy Open Ecosystem, San Sebastian, Spain
- Google Caribbean, Mountain View, California, United States
- Google King's Cross Campus, London, United Kingdom
- Johns Hopkins Student Center, Baltimore, Maryland, United States
- King Street West, Toronto, Ontario, Canada
- National Theatre of Albania, Tirana, Albania
- NOT A HOTEL Setouchi, Sagi Island, Japan
- Paris PARC, Paris, France (competition win, November 2011)
- The Robert Day Sciences Center (Claremont McKenna College), Claremont, California, United States
- S.Pellegrino Flagship Factory, San Pellegrino Terme, Italy
- Skypark Business Center, Luxembourg

== Awards ==
- 2008 Forum AID Award for Best Building in Scandinavia in 2008 (for Mountain Dwellings)
- 2008 World Architecture Festival Award for Best Residential Building (for Mountain Dwellings)
- 2009 ULI Award for Excellence (for Mountain Dwellings)
- 2011 Prix Delarue, French Academy of Architecture, Paris
- 2013 Progressive Architecture Award for Kimball Art Center
- 2013 Red Dot Award: Product Design, 'Best of the Best' | Architecture & Urban Design Archived 14 March 2015 at the Wayback Machine (for Superkilen)
- 2013 International Olympic Committee Award, Gold Medal (for Superkilen)
- 2013 ArchDaily Buildings of the Year (for Superkilen)
- 2013 Mies Van Der Rohe Award, Finalist (for Superkilen)
- 2013 Den Danske Lyspris (for Gammel Hellerup High School)
- 2014 Architizer A+ Awards Jury Winner (for the Danish Maritime Museum and Gammel Hellerup Gymnasium)
- 2014 Honor Award, American Institute of Architects (for the Danish Maritime Museum)
- 2014 Royal Institute of British Architects Awards European National Winner (for the Danish Maritime Museum)
- 2014 European Prize of Architecture Philippe Rotthier (for the Danish Maritime Museum)
- 2014 Archdaily Cultural Building of the Year (for the Danish Maritime Museum)
- 2014 Re-thinking the Future, First Award (for Vancouver House)
- 2014 Den Nordiske Lyspris (for Gammel Hellerup Gymnasium)
- 2014 World Architecture Festival Cultural Category Winner (for the Danish Maritime Museum)
- 2015 American Institute of Architects National Honor Award for Regional and Urban Design (for The DryLine resiliency project)
- 2015 Global Holcim Award for Sustainable Construction, Bronze (for The DryLine resiliency project)
- 2015 National Council of Structural Engineers Associations Awards, Excellence Award in Structural Engineering (for Grove at Grand Bay)
- 2015 World Architecture Festival Future Project of the Year (for Vancouver House)
- 2016 American Institute of Architects Honor Awards, Regional and Urban Design Award (for Smithsonian South Campus Master Plan)
- 2016 Building Design Magazine World Architecture 100 Awards, 2nd Most Admired Architectural Practice
- 2016 American Institute of Architects New York Chapter design Awards, Honor Award (for 2 World Trade Center)
- 2016 International Highrise Award, for VIA 57 West
- 2017 AIA Housing Award for Multifamily Housing (for VIA – West 57)
- 2017 ASLA NY Unbuilt Project Merit Award (for The Spiral)
- 2017 Moriyama RAIC International Prize Shortlist (for 8House)
- 2017 Interior Design Best of Year Awards, Multi-Unit Housing (for Grove on the Bay)
- 2017 London Design Awards, Silver Winner (for Google Kings Cross)
- 2017 Danish Design Award Finalist for Clean Solutions (for Urban Rigger)
- 2017 AR MIPIM Future Project Award Commendation (for Hyperloop)
- 2017 European Steel Design Award (for Copenhill)
- 2018 Nykredit's Architecture Prize (for BIG)
- 2018 AIA NY Honors Award for Architecture (for Tirpitz Museum)
- 2018 Veronica Rudge Green Prize in Urban Design Finalist (for Superkilen)
- 2018 Danish Design Award Winner (for LEGO House)
- 2018 Danish Architect Associations Lille Arne Award (for Dortheavej 2)
- 2018 HKIE Structural Excellence Award (for Shenzhen Energy Mansion)
- 2019 Mies van der Rohe Award Nominee (for Dortheavej 2)
- 2019 AIA Institute Honor Awards for Architecture (for Tirpitz Museum)
- 2019 AIA Institute Honor Award for Interior Architecture (for NOMA 2.0)
- 2019 Best Danish Lighting Prize (for NOMA 2.0)
- 2019 CTBUH Best Tall Building Award of Excellence 200-299m (for Shenzhen Energy Mansion)
- 2020 ICONIC Innovative Architecture Best of the Best Award (for Copenhill)
- 2020 Fast Company Design Company of the Year Honorable Mention (for BIG)
- 2020 UNESCO Prix Versailles Exterior World Winner (for Isenberg Innovation Hub)
- 2020 UNESCO Prix Versailles Europe Winner of Shopping Mall (for Galeries Lafayette)
- 2020 AIA NY Honor Award for Architecture (for Musee Audemars Piguet)
- 2020 LCD Berlin Leading Culture Destinations (for The Twist)
- 2020 ICONIC Innovative Architecture for Cultural Project (for MECA Culture Center)
- 2021 German Design Award Excellent Architecture Fair & Exhibition (for Musee Audemars Piguet)
- 2021 World Architecture Festival World Building of the Year (for Copenhill)
- 2021 BUILD Recognized Leaders in Architecture and Design (for BIG)
- 2021 CTBUH Award of Excellence Winner (for Vancouver House)
- 2021 CTBUH Award of Excellence Winner (for Telus Sky)
- 2022 ENR Global Best Projects Competition, Project of the Year (for Google King's Cross)
- 2022 Interior Design Magazine Best of Year Award Winner (for Biosphere Treehouse)
- 2022 Architectenweb Residential Building of the Year (for Sliushus)
- 2022 The International High-Rise Award (for Vancouver House)
- 2022 Interior Design Magazine Best of Year Award – Greater World Sustainability (for The Plus)
- 2022 MIPIM ASIA's Silver Award – Best Mixed-Use Development (for CapitaSpring)
- 2023 Singapore President*s Design (P*DA) Award (for CapitaSpring)
- 2023 CTBUH Best Tall Building Award of Excellence 200-299m (for CapitaSpring)
- 2023 CTBUH Best Tall Building Asia Award of Excellence (for CapitaSpring)
- 2023 ArchDaily Office Building of the Year (for CapitaSpring)
- 2023 DOGA-merket Architecture and Design (for The Plus)
- 2023 Scandinavian Design Awards Architecture of the Year (for The Plus)
- 2023 Aarhus Municipality Architecture Prize (for Snail House)
- 2023 Kyoto Global Design Awards - Environment category (for 50 QUEENS with Golden Days, Kunsthal Charlottenborg, Studio C)

== Exhibitions ==
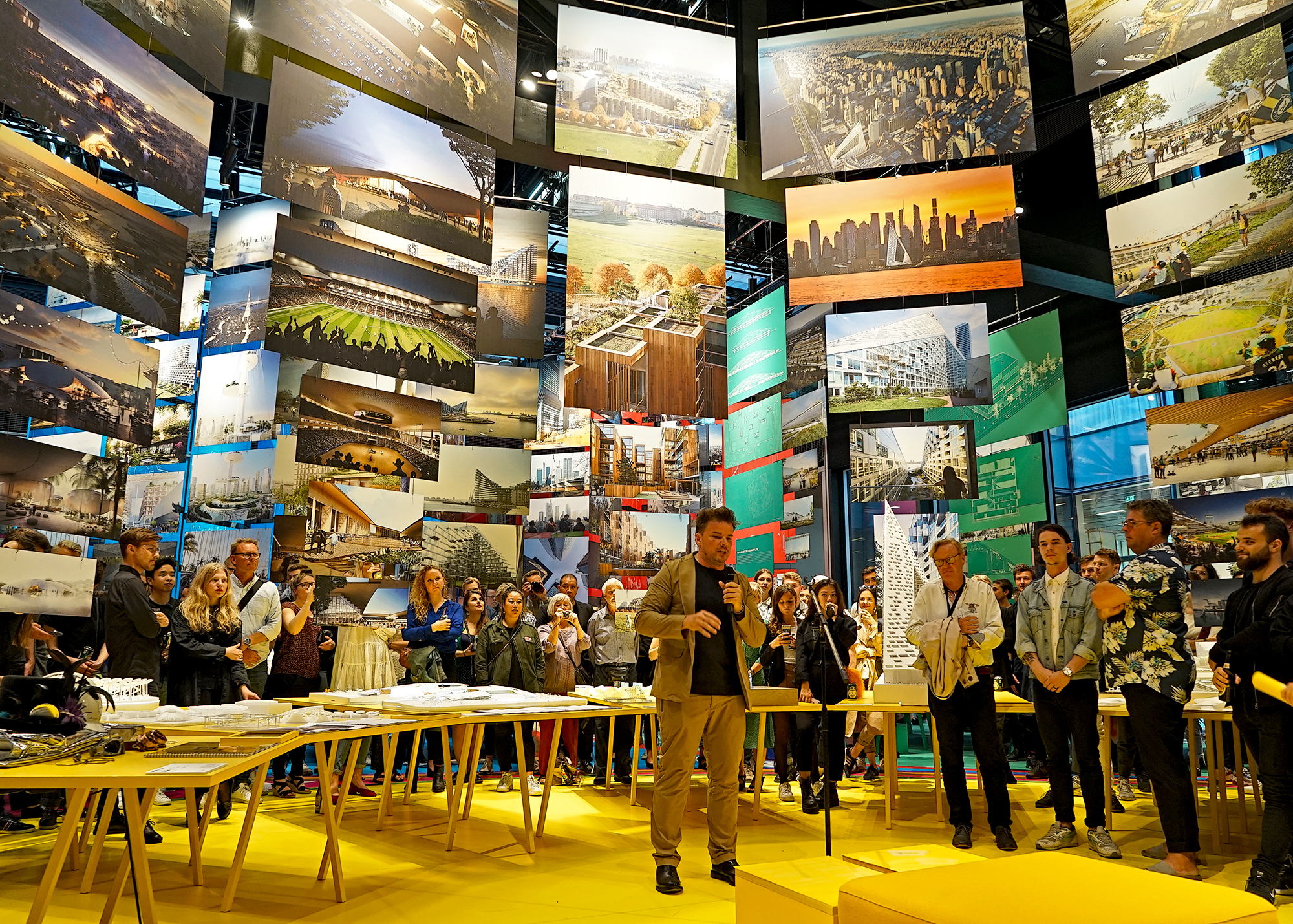
Bjarke Ingels during opening speech at exhibition of projects from Bjarke Ingels Group (BIG) at Danish Architecture Centre, Copenhagen, Denmark – June 2019

- 2006-2007 BIG Ideas, Galerie Jaroslava Fragnera, Prague, 15 November – 17 December 2006; Galerie Architektury Brno, 7 February – 4 March 2007; DESIGN FACTORY, Bratislava, 30 March – 15 April 2007
- 2007 BIG City, Storefront for Art and Architecture, New York
- 2009 Yes is More, Danish Architecture Centre, Copenhagen
- 2010 Yes is More, CAPC Bordeaux
- 2014 The BIG Maze, National Building Museum
- 2015 HOT TO COLD, National Building Museum
- 2017 BIG Art, Kunsthal Charlottenborg, Copenhagen

== Publications ==
- Hot to Cold: An Odyssey of Architectural Adaptation, Taschen – 2015
- Yes Is More: An Archicomic on Architectural Evolution, Taschen – 2009
- Museum in the Dock, Arvinius + Orfeus Publishing – 2014
- Superkilen Book, Arvinius + Orfeus Publishing – 2013
- AV Monograph BIG, Arquitectura Viva – 2013
- Being BIG by Abitare, Abitare – 2012
- BIG Red Book, Ada Edita Global Architecture – 2012
- BIG Pink Book, Archilife – 2010
- BIG Bjarke Ingels Group Projects 2001–2010, Design Media Publishing Ltd – 2011
- A Project as an Icon, an Icon as a Project, in STUDIO Architecture and Urbanism magazine Issue#03 Icon, Milan, edited by Romolo Calabrese, 2012 Article
- Architektur und Baudetails/Architecture and Construction Details: BIG, Edition DETAIL – 2022
- Formgiving, Taschen – 2020
