= 1200 Intrepid =

Office building

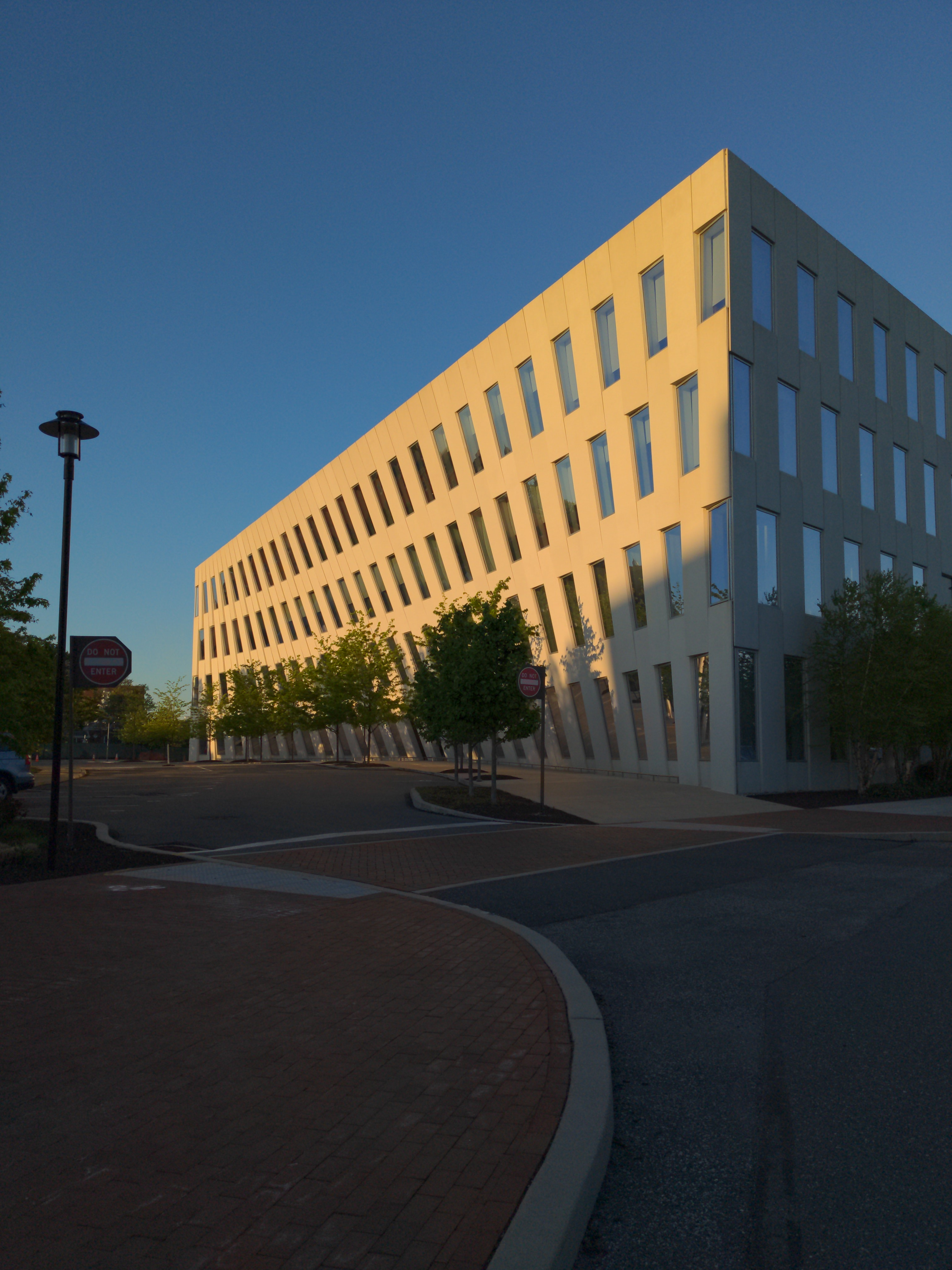
- Interactive map of the 1200 Intrepid area

General information
- Type: Office
- Location: Philadelphia, Pennsylvania, U.S.
- Coordinates: 39.8939°N 75.1725°W

Technical details
- Floor count: 4
- Floor area: 92,000 sq ft (8,547 m^{2})

Design and construction
- Architect: Bjarke Ingels

1200 Intrepid is an office building located in The Navy Yard in Philadelphia. It was designed by architectural firm BIG, which is led by Danish architect Bjarke Ingels. It was built by Turner Construction. Construction began in 2015 and was completed in 2016. The building's first tenant is Penn Capital Management.

The building was built on spec, without a specific designated tenant. It was designed with the curving shape of battleships in mind, as well as the design of the circular park adjacent the building. Despite the curving of the building's walls, it nevertheless conforms to Robert A. M. Stern's master plan for the Navy Yard, which calls for traditional, box-shaped office buildings.

Pharmacy chain Rite Aid leased space in the building in late 2021. The company plans to move its headquarters to the building.

== Architectural reception ==
Inga Saffron, the architecture critic for The Philadelphia Inquirer referred to the building's curved wall as "mesmerizing". Ingels has compared the white concrete panels that make up the building's facade to "...bracelets of a watch [tilting to create] a graceful, organic space and inviting cavelike canopy".
