= The Danish Growth Fund =

Danish sovereign wealth fund

The Danish Growth Fund (Danish: Vækstfonden) is Denmark's investment fund. The Danish Growth Fund is an independent fund governed by an independent legal act and an independent board of directors. The act concerning The Danish Growth Fund stipulates that the fund must promote growth and renewal for small and medium-sized enterprises in order to achieve a greater socio-economic return. The fund contributes to the creation of new companies by providing capital and expertise. Since 1992, The Danish Growth Fund has co-financed growth in more than 5,400 companies with a total commitment of more than DKK 15 billion. The Danish Growth Fund provides loans and guarantees in collaboration with Danish financial institutions. Through the department for venture capital, VF Venture, the fund invests equity in SME's. In 2013, the companies co-financed by The Danish Growth Fund had over 41,000 employees in total.

In 2023, the fund was merged with the Danish Green Investment Fund and the Danish Export Credit Agency to form the Export and Investment Fund of Denmark (EIFO).

== Investments ==
=== Real estate ===
In 2016 and 2017, the fund, through the Danish venture capital firm Sunstone Capital, participated in two funding rounds of Exporo, a German real estate fund platform. In 2020, the Danish Growth Fund provided funding of $474,000 to the startup Propstep, to help develop its housing tool platform. In February 2021, the fund contributed to a Nordic real estate investment firm's €130 million urban tech fund through the Green Future Fund. The fund participated in a $2.1 million fundraising round for Legacy in July 2022. Legacy develops software for the a reporting and calculation of CO_{2} emissions in the real estate sector. In September 2022, the fund contributed to a €2 million fundraiser of Captego, a Danish start-up. The company raised the money for its "field data engine", which helps to monitor and control site activities.

=== Technology, media and telecom ===
In 2008 the Danish Growth Fund invested €1.5 million into Universal Robots. In January 2018, the fund invested $30 million into the learning company Area9 Lyceum, an educational tech company. In March of the same year, the fund participated in a $6.6 million funding round for Orderyoyo. In September 2020, the speaker manufacturer Soundboks, received $8.4 million from an investment round, in which the Danish Growth Fund participated. The fund was a part of two funding rounds for the startup Multiscription, which raised a total of $2.8 million. In February 2021, the fund was involved in a €29 million investment for NIL Technology. In July 2025, the EIFO was part of a $5.8 million funding round for Quadsat.
