= Suzhou Museum of Contemporary Art =

- 苏州当代美术馆
- Established: August 2025
- Location: Right Bank of Jinji Lake, Suzhou Industrial Park, Suzhou, Jiangsu Province, China
- Type: Contemporary art museum
- Architect: Bjarke Ingels Group

Suzhou Museum of Contemporary Art (Chinese: 苏州当代美术馆) is a contemporary art museum located on the right bank of Jinji Lake in Suzhou Industrial Park, Suzhou, Jiangsu Province, China. Designed by the Danish architecture firm Bjarke Ingels Group.

== Architecture ==
The Suzhou Museum of Contemporary Art is designed as a "village" of pavilion-like volumes linked by corridors and outdoor galleries.

The museum complex occupies a site of approximately 60,000 m^{2}, with a reported total gross floor area of about 58,800 m^{2} and exhibition spaces of around 10,600 m^{2}. The core exhibition area consists of four main standalone gallery buildings. Additional volumes accommodate a performance and event space, a multi‑function hall, and other support and public facilities.
