= Area9 Lyceum =

Educational technology company

- Industry: Adaptive learning
- Founded: 2006
- Founders: Ulrik Juul Christensen, MD; Khurram Jamil, MD; Asger Alstrup-Palm; Tommy Olesen
- Headquarters: Copenhagen, & Boston, Massachusetts, Denmark & United States
- Website: area9lyceum.com

Area9 Lyceum is a cloud-based adaptive-learning software provider headquartered in Copenhagen, Denmark and Boston, Massachusetts.

== History ==
Area9 was founded in 2006 by Ulrik Juul Christensen, MD, Khurram Jamil, MD, Asger Alstrup Palm and Tommy Olesen with the goal of building upon the research of Ulrik Juul Christensen, a medical doctor who had been studying the effect of simulation and adaptive learning, on medical training.

In 2007, McGraw Hill Education (MHE) partnered with Area9 to develop adaptive e-textbooks for Higher Education, and later K-12.

In 2014, Area9 became Area9 Group, and formed Area9 Learning to concentrate on corporate training and professional development. Also in 2014, NEJM Group (publishers of The New England Journal of Medicine) partnered with Area9 to develop NEJM Knowledge+ an adaptive learning platform containing courses designed with clinicians’ demanding schedules in mind. Amboss acquired NEJM Knowledge+ content in 2024, ending the NEJM relationship with Area9.

In 2018, Area9 Lyceum, ApS was formally established within the Area9 Group. In the same year, the company received $30 million from The Danish Growth Fund.

In 2020, the American Heart Association & Laerdal Medical via their joint venture RQI Partners, embarked on a collaboration with Area9 Lyceum, to produce resuscitation training for healthcare professionals.

== Free COVID-19 Education ==
In March 2020, Area9 developed and launched a Free COVID-19 Education course to disseminate information about the disease.

In April 2020, Area9 Lyceum collaborated with CAE Healthcare to provide clinicians with an online COVID-19 Ventilator Reskilling course.

== Awards ==
From 2017 to 2019, Area9 Lyceum was named a top training company, in the authoring-tools category, by Industry Training.

In 2018, Area9 Lyceum won silver, in the category of "best advance in software for a training company," at the Brandon Hall Excellence in Technology awards.
