= Romolo Calabrese =

Italian architect

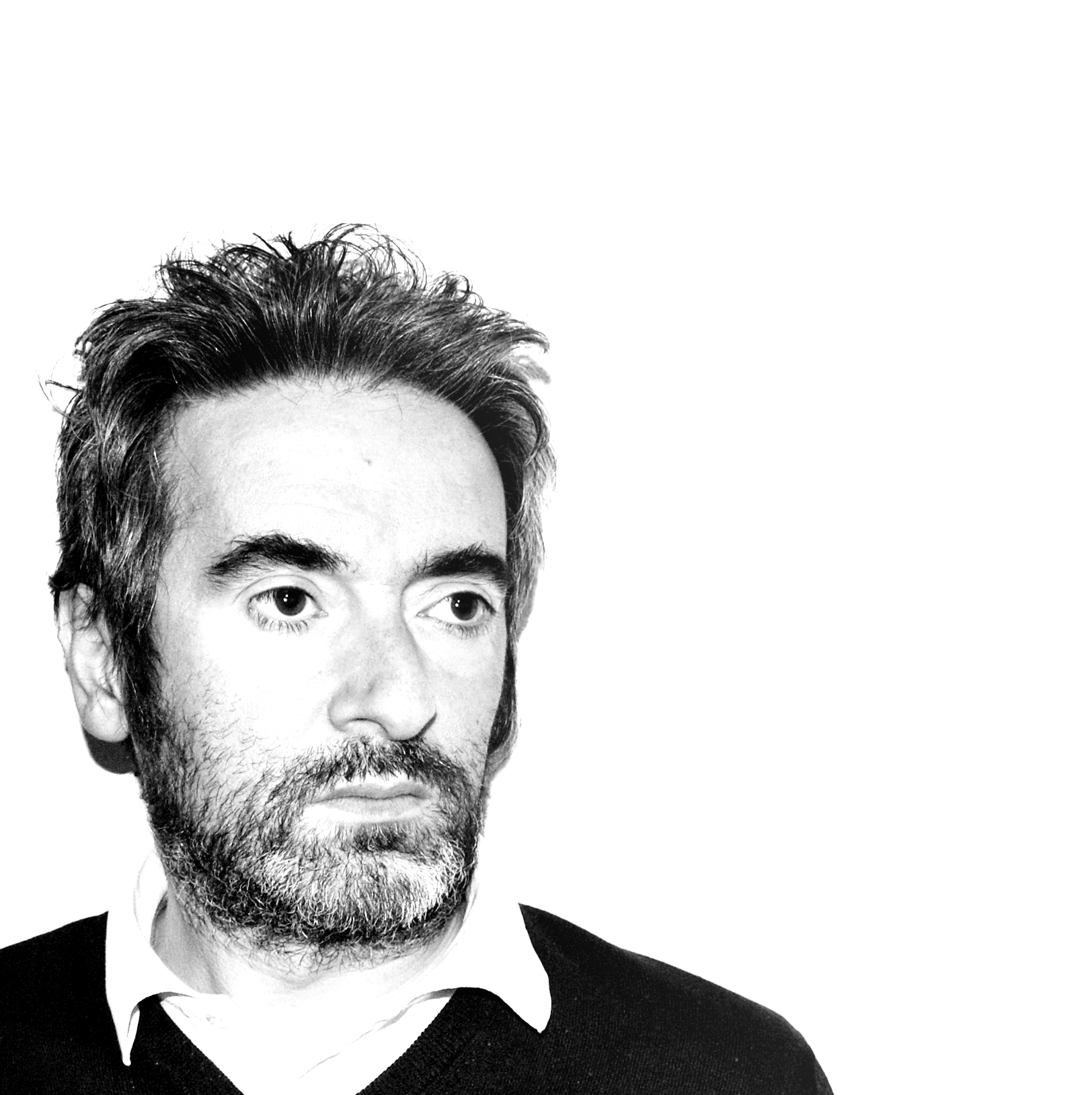
- Born: Milan, 1966
- Occupation: Architect
- Practice: RRC Studio

Romolo Calabrese is an Italian architect, active nationally and internationally in the design field and in theoretical debate. He was born in Milan and studied architecture at Politecnico di Milano where he graduated in 1998. From 1995 to 1997 he trained at Aldo Rossi's office, who he collaborated with on several projects. In 1999 he founded RRC Studio Architetti in Milan and in 2003 he opened a second office in Cap d'Ail, France. By participating in many architectural competitions, he won in 2007 the first prize for the construction of a block of "Viviendas y Oficinas" in Zaragoza, a project within Expo 2008's urban development of the city. Later he participated in Rizoma's exhibition: "Biennale Giovani Architetti Italiani". In 2012 he won the first prize for a secondary school in Berlingo.

In 2011 he founded STUDIO Architecture and Urbanism magazine.

== Selected projects ==
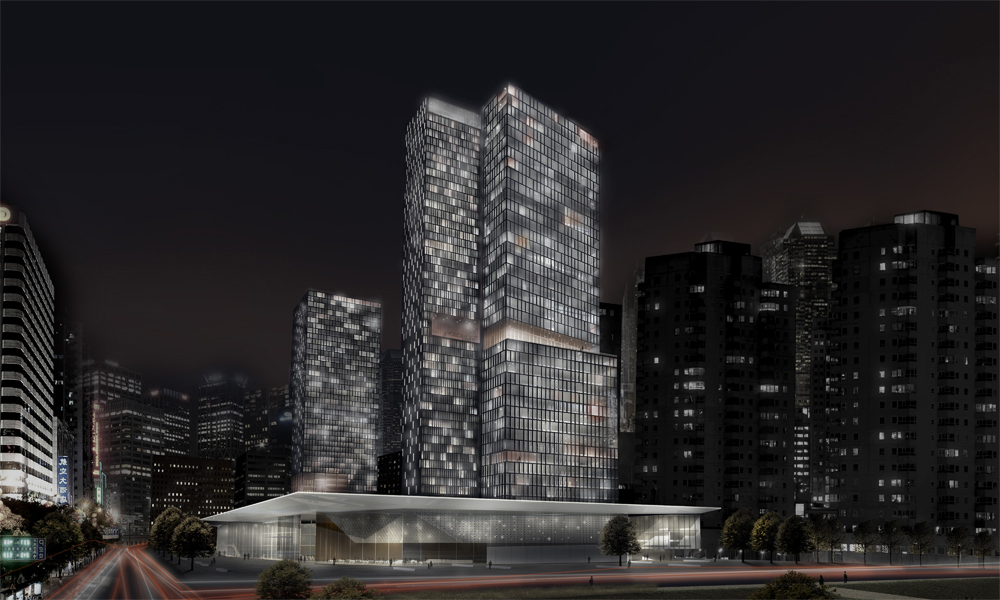
Three-Towers-Shanghai

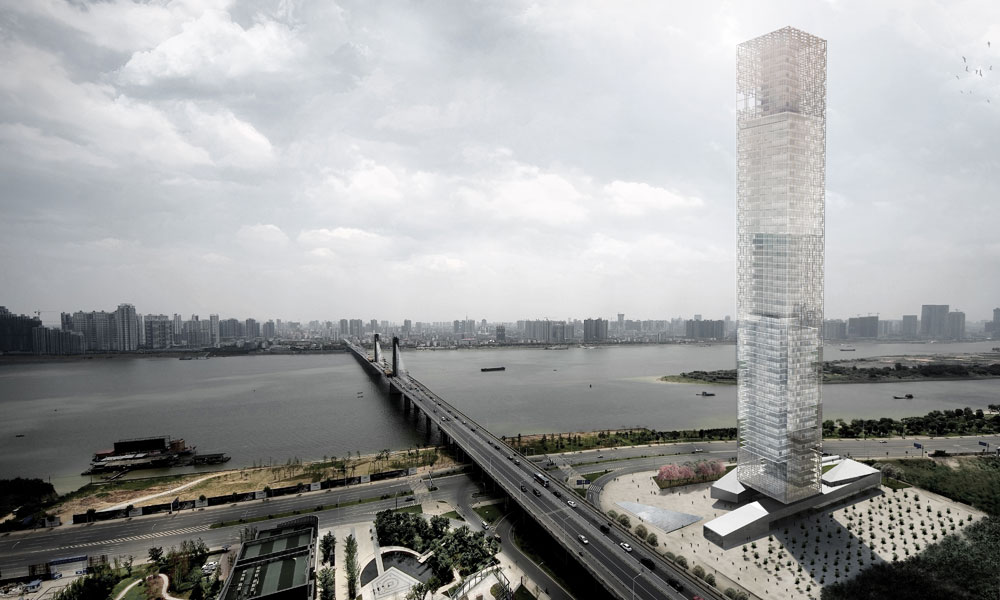
Xiang River Tower - Changsha

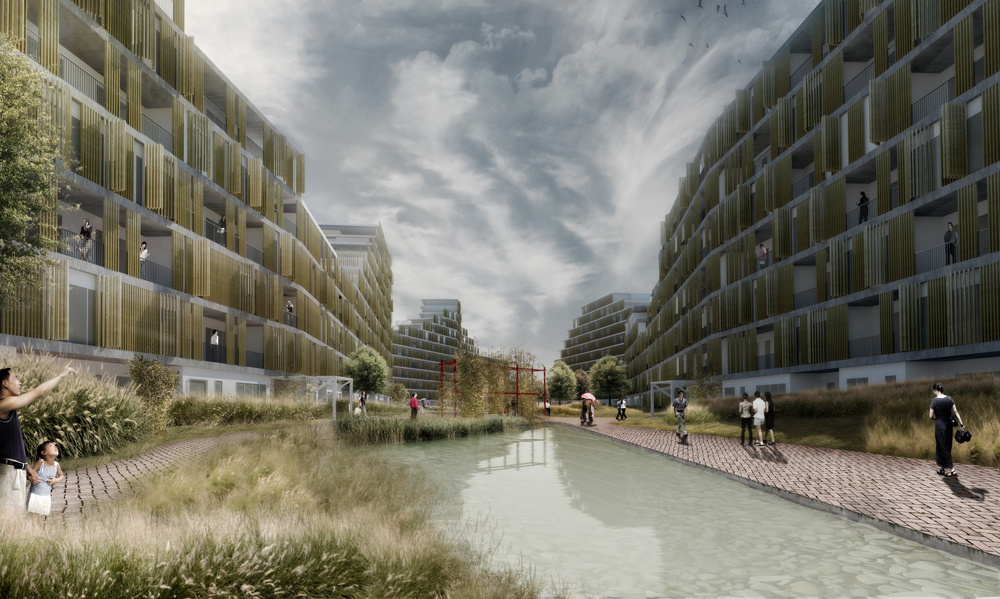
Residential-Complex-Pudong-China

- 2006 School Complex, San Mauro Torinese, Italy
- 2006 Rvr Office Building, Milan, Italy
- 2006 Sports Center, Balmaseda, Spain
- 2007 Agricultural School, Mezzana, Switzerland
- 2007 Residential and office, Zaragoza, Spain
- 2007 Sports Center, Chiasso, Switzerland
- 2008 Municipal Market, Sanchinarro Madrid, Spain
- 2008 City Masterplan, Copenhagen, Denmark
- 2009 Residential Neighborhood, Toledo, Spain
- 2009 Residential Neighborhood, Milan, Italy
- 2010 Music and Dance School, Menorca, Spain
- 2010 Housing Building, Madrid, Spain
- 2010 Secondary School, Berlingo, Italy
- 2011 Serlachius museum, Mantaa, Finland
- 2011 Archaeological Museum, Villaputzu, Italy
- 2011 Office building Tortona, Milan, Italy
- 2012 Multifunctional complex, Shanghai, China
- 2012 New law court, La Chaux de Fonds, Switzerland
- 2013 Monumental Aedicule, Milan, Italy
- 2013 Xiang River Tower, Changsha, China
- 2013 Professional School, Riaz Fribourg, Switzerland
- 2013 New town masterplan, Pudong Shanghai, China
- 2013 Residential building, Milan, Italy
- 2014 New city development, Al Dhakira, Qatar

== Publications ==
- Illegal Act, on Illegal, December 2014
- From Political Ideologies to Market Ideologies, on Power, June 2014
- Dreiländereck, on Import Export, November 2013 article
- Transforming the Un-Changed, on Transformation, May 2013
- Entrez Lentement, on Original, April 2012 article
- A forced resurrection/The news, on [from]Crisis[to], January 2012
