= Via 57 West =

Residential building in Manhattan, New York

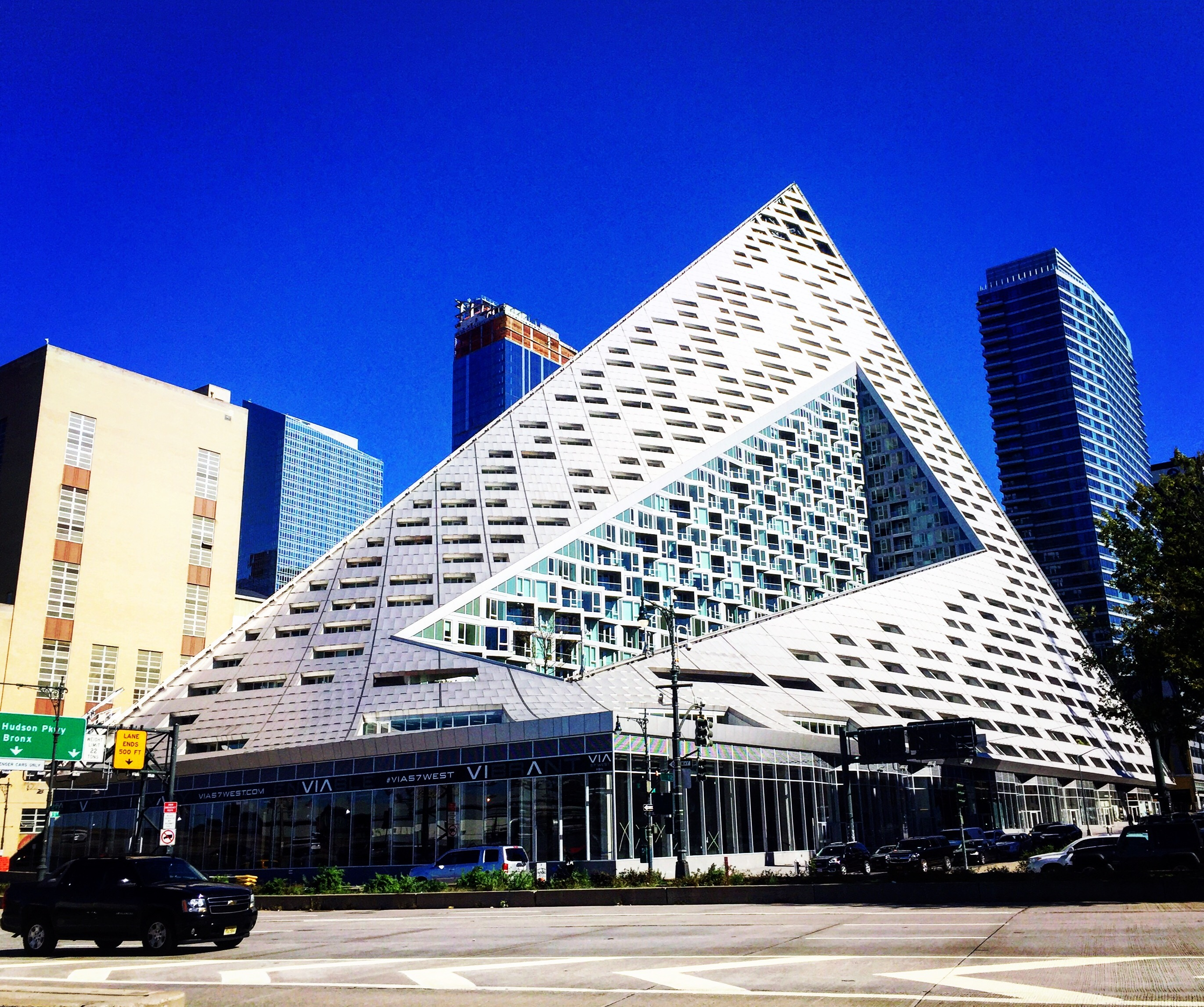
- Via 57 West from the West Side Highway
- Interactive map of the Via 57 West area
- Alternative names: Pyramid, West 57th, W57, West57, Tetrahedron

General information
- Status: Completed
- Type: Residential
- Architectural style: Modern
- Location: 625 West 57th Street, Manhattan, New York City, United States
- Coordinates: 40°46′17″N 73°59′35″W
- Construction started: 2013
- Completed: 2016

Height
- Architectural: 467 ft (142.3 m)
- Tip: 467 ft (142.3 m)
- Top floor: 355 ft (108.2 m)

Technical details
- Material: Concrete
- Floor count: 34
- Floor area: 830,995 sq ft (77,200 m^{2})
- Lifts/elevators: 11

Design and construction
- Architect: Bjarke Ingels Group
- Developer: The Durst Organization
- Engineer: Thornton Tomasetti
- Main contractor: Hunter Roberts Construction Group
- Awards and prizes: 2016 CTBUH Tall Building Awards: Best Tall Building Americas

Other information
- Parking: 285

Via 57 West (marketed as VIΛ 57WEST) is a residential building at 625 West 57th Street, between 11th and 12th Avenues, in the Hell's Kitchen neighborhood of Manhattan in New York City. The pyramid shaped tower block or "tetrahedron", designed by the Danish architecture firm Bjarke Ingels Group (BIG), rises 467 ft (142 m) and is 35-stories tall.

== History ==
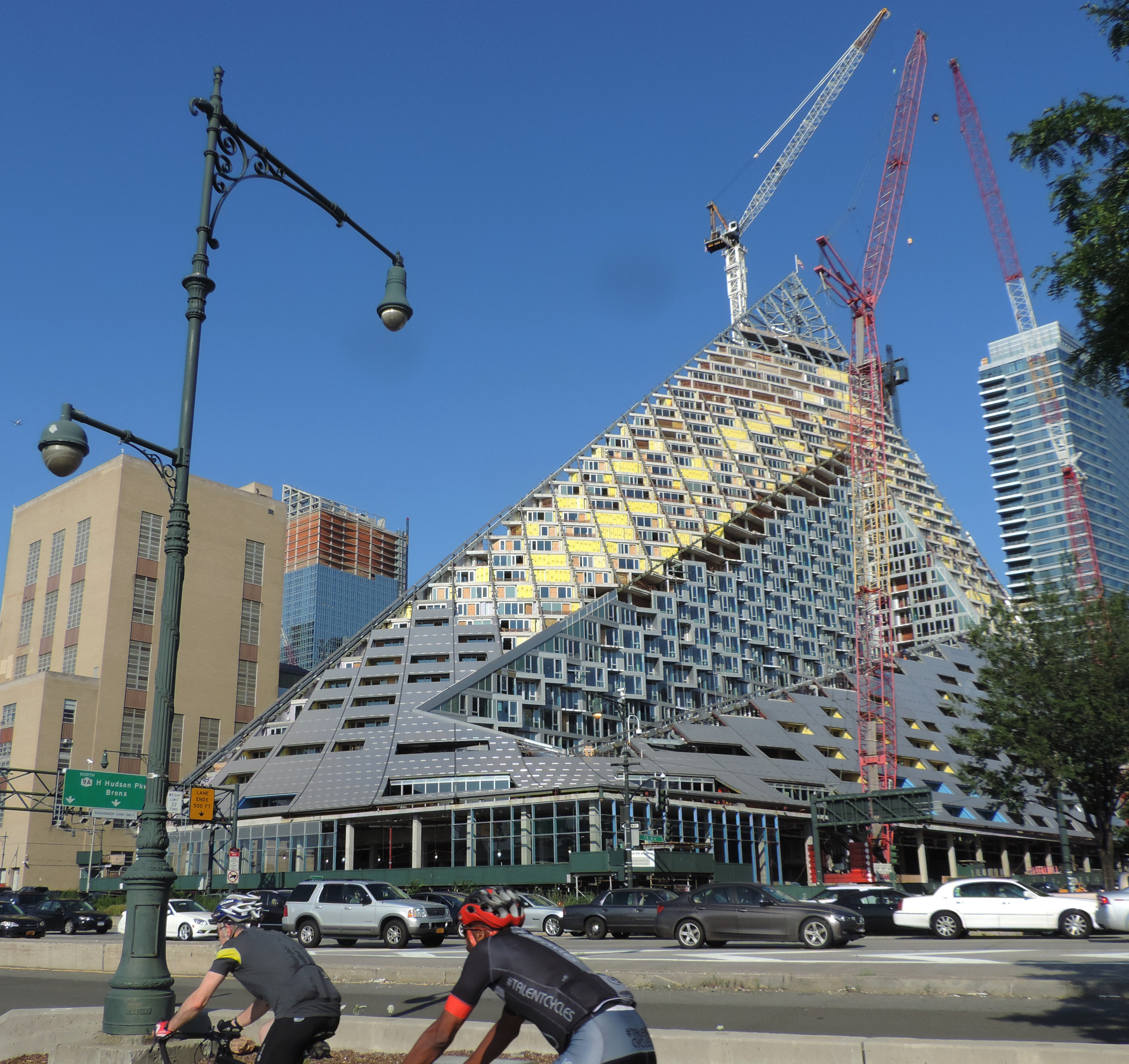
Under construction in July 2015

Bjarke Ingels met the New York developer Douglas Durst Chairman of The Durst Organization in the early 2000s when he was in Denmark. Durst, who visited Ingels' Copenhagen studio in February 2010, found him very inventive, noting that unlike other architects, "What was striking about his work was that each design was so different, and designed for the locale."

In spring 2009, Durst Fetner Residential commissioned BIG to bring a new residential typology to Manhattan. In 2011, BIG opened an office in New York to supervise W57's development and construction. According to The New York Times, the name was chosen "because the southbound West Side Highway slopes down as drivers enter the city, right at the spot where the building is situated", serving as an entrance to Manhattan "via 57th".

Landmark Theatres ran an eight-screen movie theater on the ground floor of the building. The theater closed in August 2020 following nearly three years of operation after struggling to attract moviegoers, in part due to the location's distance from public transit. Look Cinemas leased the theater in February 2023 and opened a "dine-in" theater there in May 2023. The dine-in theater closed in January 2026.

== Architecture ==
Via 57 West is Ingels's first New York project. From Manhattan, the 709-unit building resembles a distorted pyramid with a steeply sloped facade, rising 467 feet (142 m) toward the northeast. Across the river in Weehawken, New Jersey, the building's sloped facade gives the appearance of an extra large sailing vessel making its way across the Hudson River.

With its angular balconies around an integrated green plaza, the block connects with the waterfront and Hudson River Park, taking full account of the surroundings while providing views with little traffic noise. The building has a floor area of 861,000 square feet (80,000 m^{2}) including residential and retail programming. The northern facade of the building features a number of balconies skewed at a 45-degree angle, a pattern employed in Ingels's previous works, such as the VM Houses in the Ørestad section of Copenhagen. Because of the combination of interior plaza and high-rise sections, Via 57 West was labeled by Bjarke Ingels Group as a "courtscraper".

== Reception ==
The triangular structure has been described as a hybrid between a European perimeter block and a traditional Manhattan high-rise. One reviewer described it as a torqued pyramid or "a quarter of a watermelon that’s had a large chunk surgically extracted from its center." It was given the Emporis Best Skyscraper design award in 2016. It also won the 2016 CTBUH Tall Building Awards for Best Tall Building Americas, along with the 2016 International Highrise Award. In 2017, it won the American Institute of Architects' (AIA) Housing Award in the Multifamily Housing category.
